= List of the Cenozoic life of Alabama =

This list of the Cenozoic life of Alabama contains the various prehistoric life-forms whose fossilized remains have been reported from within the US state of Alabama and are between 66 million and 10,000 years of age.

== A ==
- †Abderospira
  - †Abderospira aldrichi
  - †Abderospira meyeri
  - †Abderospira sabina
- †Abdounia
  - †Abdounia enniskilleni
  - †Abdounia recticona
- Abra
  - †Abra nitens
- †Absonocytheropteron
  - †Absonocytheropteron watervalleyensis
- †Acanthionella
  - †Acanthionella oecioporosa – type locality for species
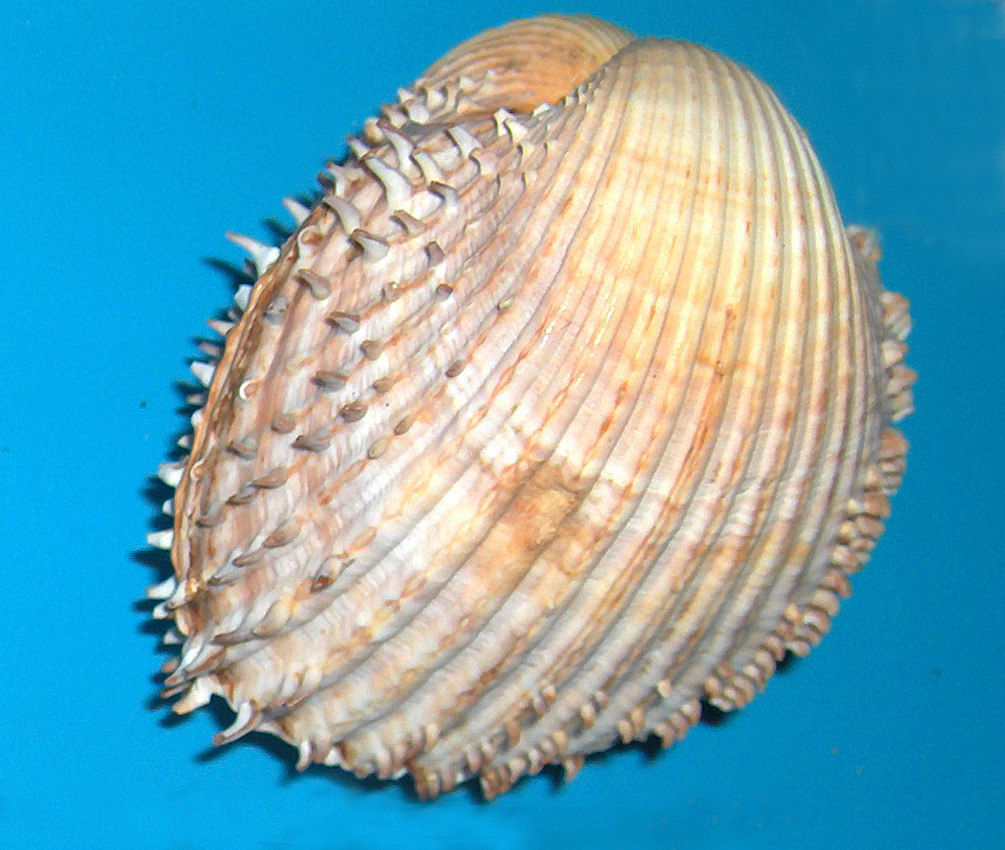
- Shell of an Acanthocardia cockle
  Acanthocardia
  - †Acanthocardia claibornensis
  - †Acanthocardia tuomeyi
- Acanthodesia
  - †Acanthodesia savartii
- Accipiter
  - †Accipiter striatus
- Acirsa
  - †Acirsa gracilior
- Aclis – report made of unidentified related form or using admittedly obsolete nomenclature
  - †Aclis modesta
- †Acrocoelum
  - †Acrocoelum cancellatum
- †Acropomatidarum – report made of unidentified related form or using admittedly obsolete nomenclature
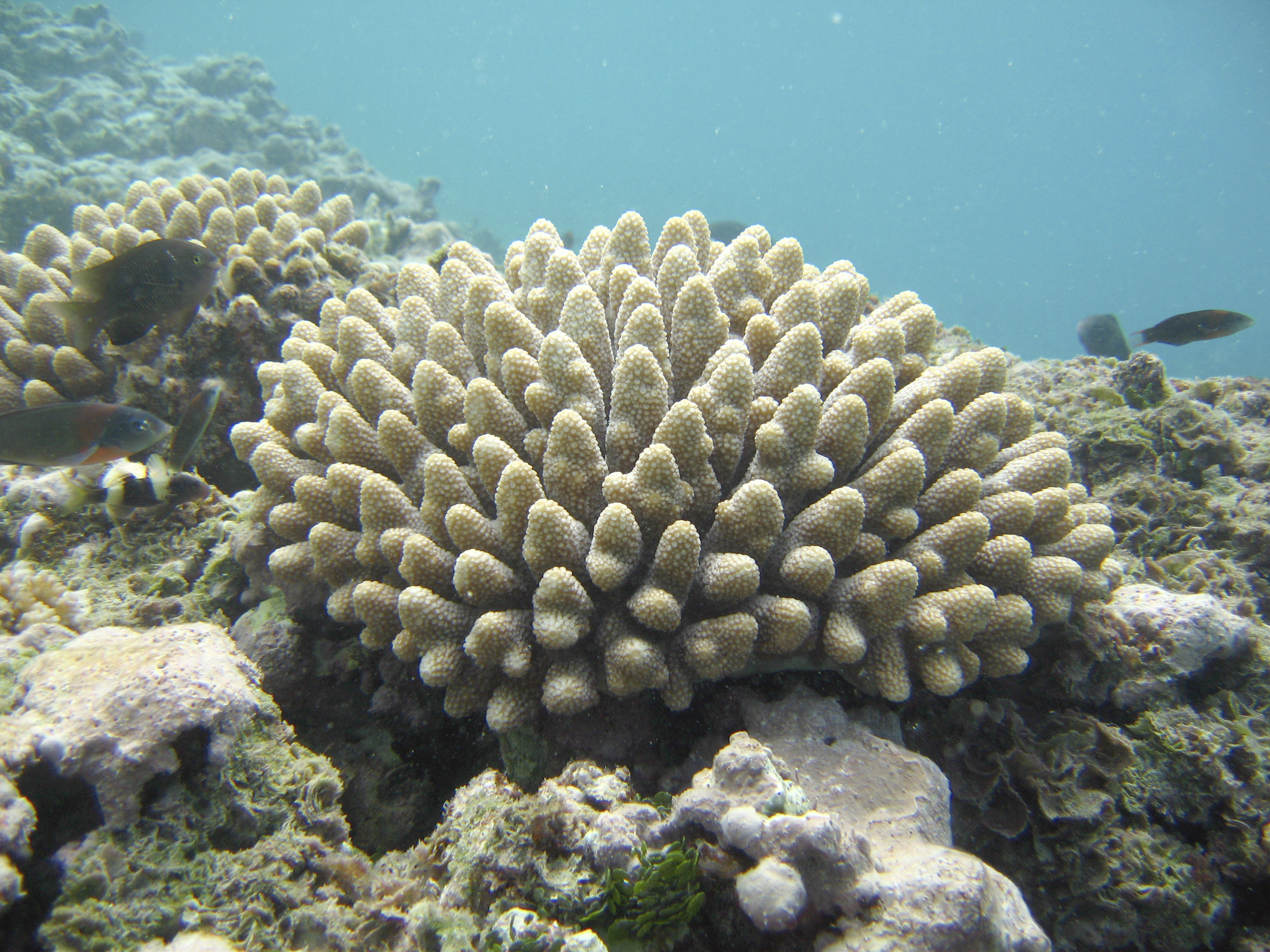
- Living Acropora coral
  Acropora
  - †Acropora saillans
- Actaeonema
  - †Actaeonema sulcatum
- Acteocina
  - †Acteocina commixta
  - †Acteocina leai
- Acteon
  - †Acteon claibornicola
  - †Acteon costellatus
  - †Acteon idoneus
  - †Acteon pomilius
- †Actinacis
  - †Actinacis barretti
- †Actinocyclina
  - †Actinocyclina bainbridgensis
- Actinocythereis
  - †Actinocythereis gibsonensis
- †Acuticythereis
  - †Acuticythereis cocoaensis
- Adeonellopsis
  - †Adeonellopsis cyclops – type locality for species
  - †Adeonellopsis galeata
  - †Adeonellopsis magniporosa – type locality for species
  - †Adeonellopsis porosa – type locality for species
  - †Adeonellopsis transversa
- †Adeorbis – report made of unidentified related form or using admittedly obsolete nomenclature
  - †Adeorbis incertus
  - †Adeorbis punctiformis
- Aequipecten
  - †Aequipecten cocoana
  - †Aequipecten deshayesi
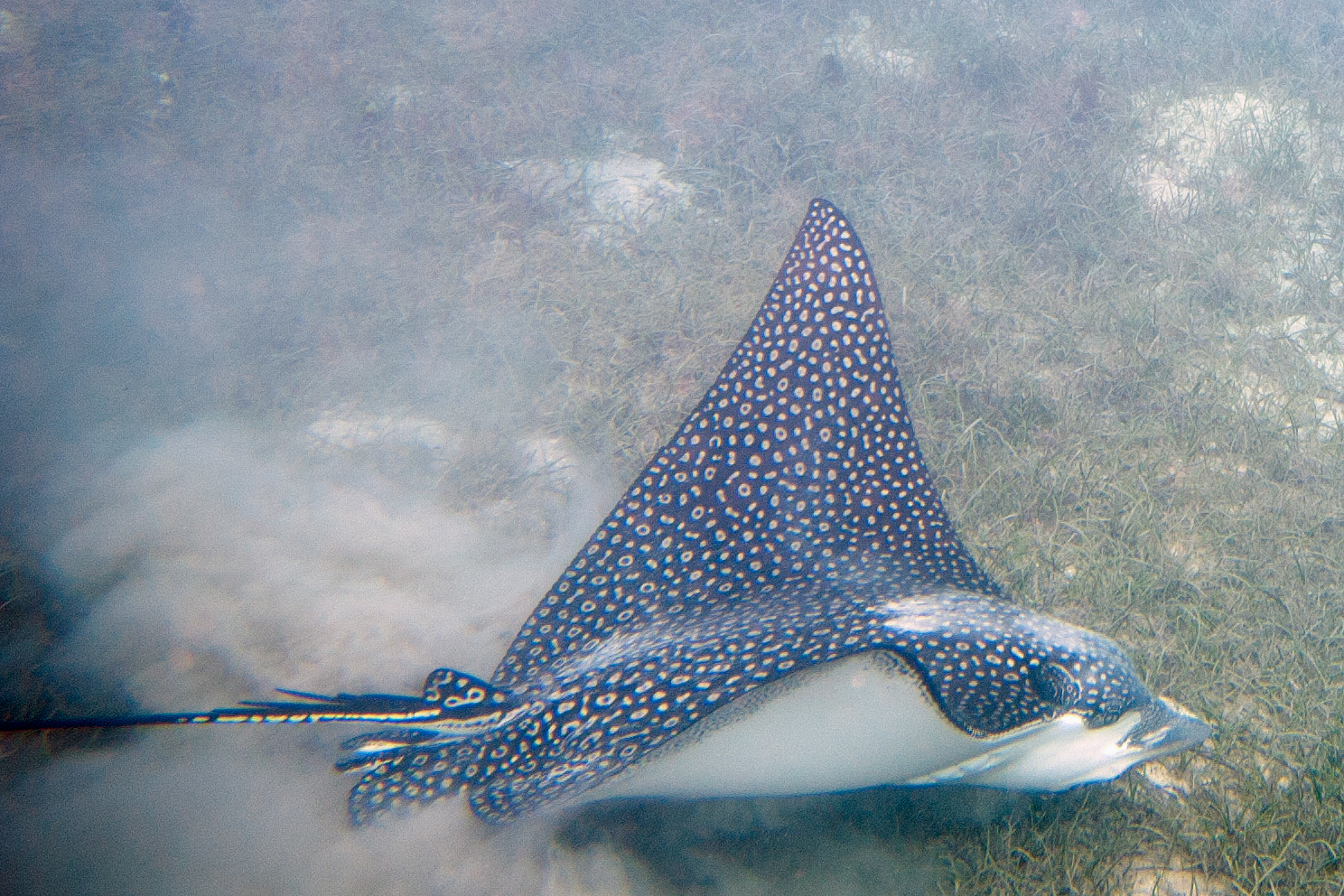
- A living Aetobatus eagle ray
  Aetobatus
- Agaronia
  - †Agaronia alabamensis
  - †Agaronia bombylis
  - †Agaronia mediavia
- †Agomphus
  - †Agomphus alabamensis – type locality for species
- Aimulosia
  - †Aimulosia clavula – type locality for species
- Alaba
  - †Alaba plicatovaricosa
  - †Alaba varicifer
- Albula
  - †Albula bashiana – or unidentified related form
- †Albulidarum – report made of unidentified related form or using admittedly obsolete nomenclature
- Alderina – tentative report
  - †Alderina nodulosa
- †Allomorone – type locality for genus
  - †Allomorone burlesonis – type locality for species
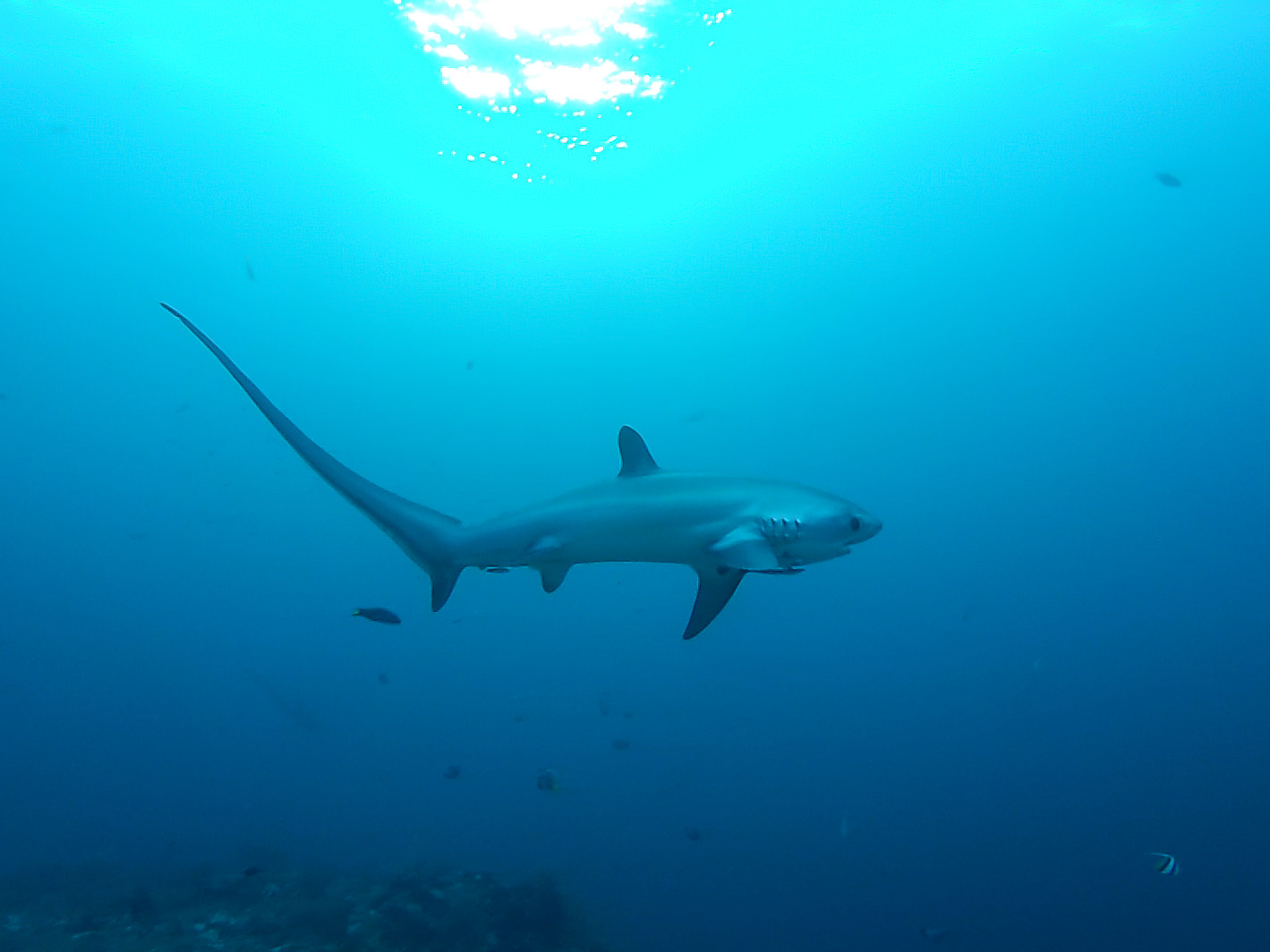
- A living Alopias, or thresher shark
  Alopias
  - †Alopias latidens
- †Alveinus
  - †Alveinus minutus
- Amaura
  - †Amaura tombigbeensis
- †Ambigostrea
  - †Ambigostrea tecticosta
- †Ambystoma
  - †Ambystoma maculotum
- Ampheristus
- Amphiblestrum
  - †Amphiblestrum curvatum – type locality for species
- †Ampullina
  - †Ampullina recurva
- Amusium
  - †Amusium ocalanum
- Anas
  - †Anas crecca
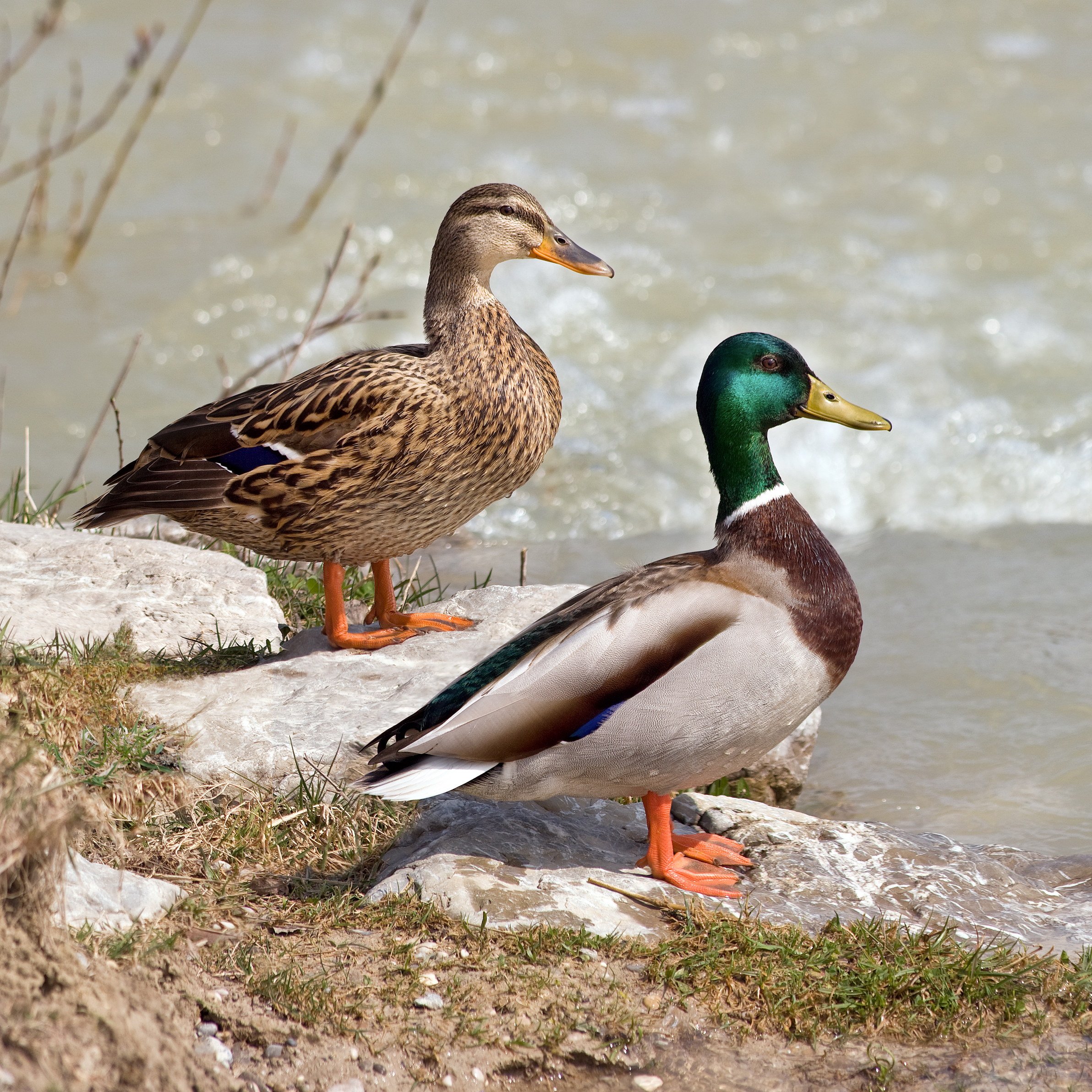
  - Living female (left) and male (right) Anas platyrhynchos, or mallard ducks
    †Anas platyrhynchos
- Ancilla
  - †Ancilla staminea
  - †Ancilla subglobosa
- Angaria – report made of unidentified related form or using admittedly obsolete nomenclature
  - †Angaria concionaria
- Angulus
  - †Angulus entaenia
  - †Angulus plana
  - †Angulus prolenta
- Anodontia
  - †Anodontia subvexa
- Anolis
  - †Anolis carolinensis
- Anomia
  - †Anomia argentaria
  - †Anomia ephippioides
  - †Anomia hammetti
  - †Anomia lisbonensis
  - †Anomia navicelloides
  - †Anomia taylorensis
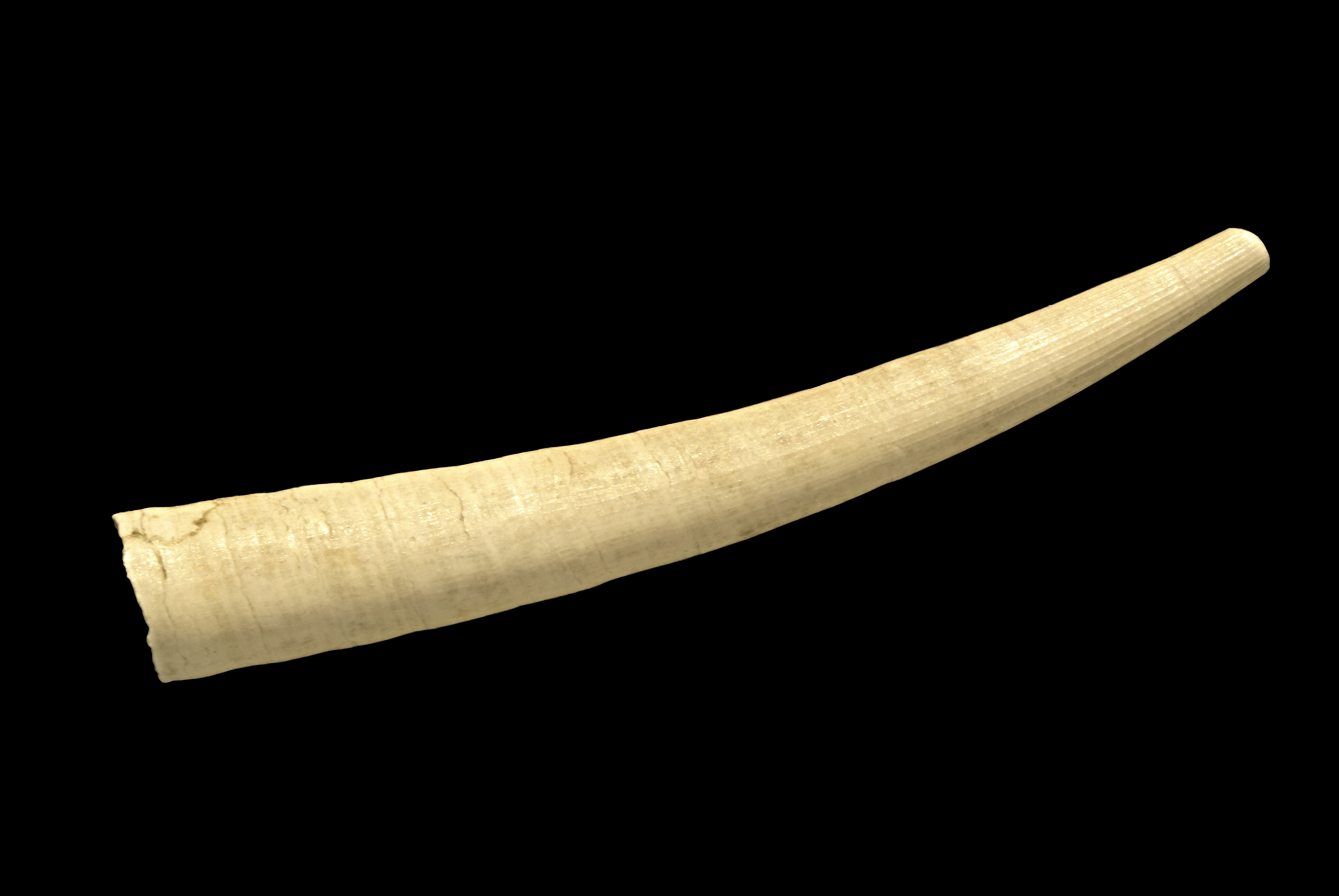
- A shell of an Antalis tusk shell
  Antalis
  - †Antalis arciforme
  - †Antalis blandum
  - †Antalis minutistriatum
  - †Antalis thalloides
- Antropora
  - †Antropora damicornis
  - †Antropora minuta
  - †Antropora pyriforme
  - †Antropora pyriformis
  - †Antropora recta
  - †Antropora rectum
  - †Antropora wadei
- Apalone
  - †Apalone spinifera
- †Aphelops
  - †Aphelops mutilus
- Aplodinotus – tentative report
- †Apogonidarum – report made of unidentified related form or using admittedly obsolete nomenclature
  - †Apogonidarum rostrosus – type locality for species
- †Aporolepas
  - †Aporolepas howei
- Aporrhais
  - †Aporrhais aldrichi
- Aprionodon
  - †Aprionodon greyegertoni – type locality for species
- Arca
  - †Arca hatchetigbeensis
- Archaeolithothamnium
- †Archicythereis – report made of unidentified related form or using admittedly obsolete nomenclature
  - †Archicythereis yazooensis
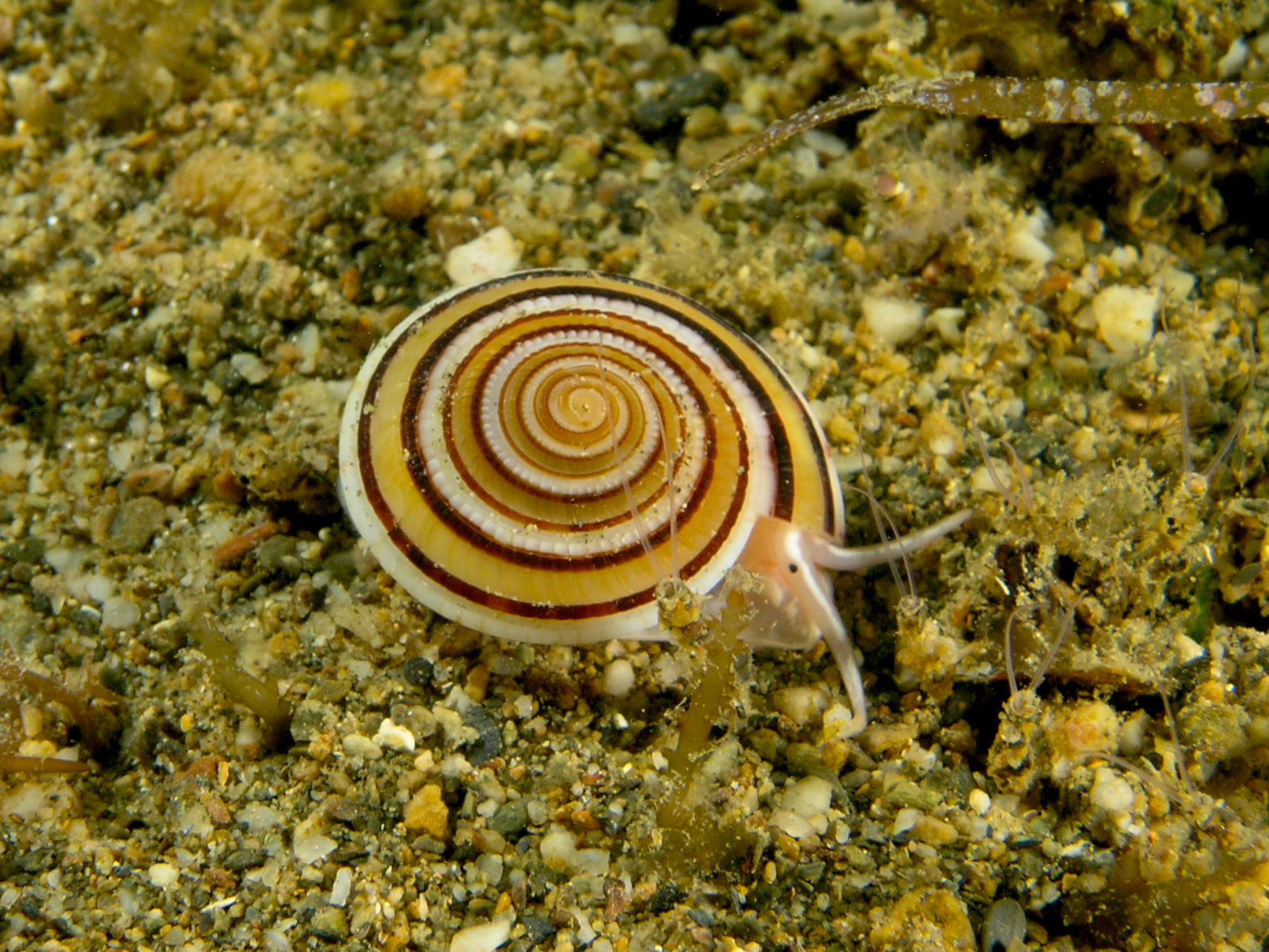
- A living Architectonica staircase shell sea snail
  Architectonica
  - †Architectonica alabamensis
  - †Architectonica aldrichi
  - †Architectonica alveatum
  - †Architectonica amoena
  - †Architectonica antrosa
  - †Architectonica bellensis
  - †Architectonica bimixta
  - †Architectonica caelatura
  - †Architectonica cossmanni
  - †Architectonica cupola
  - †Architectonica elaborata
  - †Architectonica fungina
  - †Architectonica greggi
  - †Architectonica huppertzi
  - †Architectonica intusa
  - †Architectonica johnsoni
  - †Architectonica meekana
  - †Architectonica ornata
  - †Architectonica periscelida
  - †Architectonica petrosus
  - †Architectonica planiformis
  - †Architectonica sabinia
  - †Architectonica sylvaerupis
- Arcopagia
  - †Arcopagia raveneli
  - †Arcopagia trumani
- Arcoscalpellum
  - †Arcoscalpellum toulmini – type locality for species
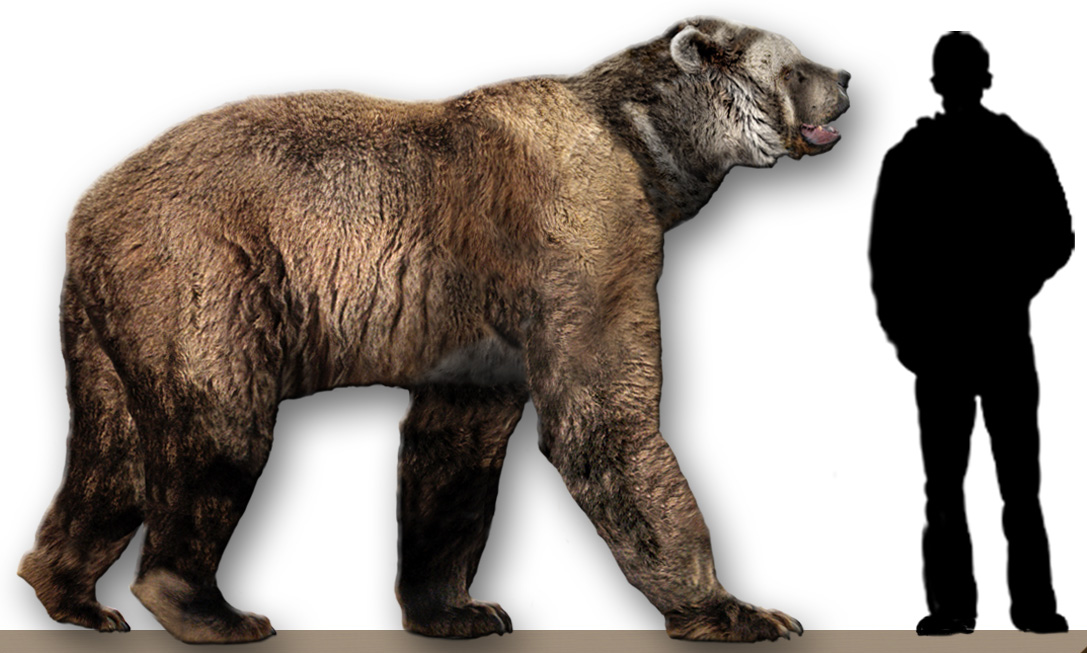
- Restoration of an Arctodus, or short-faced bear, with a human to scale
  †Arctodus
  - †Arctodus simus
- †Area
  - †Area hatchetigbeensis
- Argobuccinum
  - †Argobuccinum showalteri
  - †Argobuccinum tuomeyi
- Argyrotheca
  - †Argyrotheca macneili – type locality for species
- †Ariidarum – report made of unidentified related form or using admittedly obsolete nomenclature
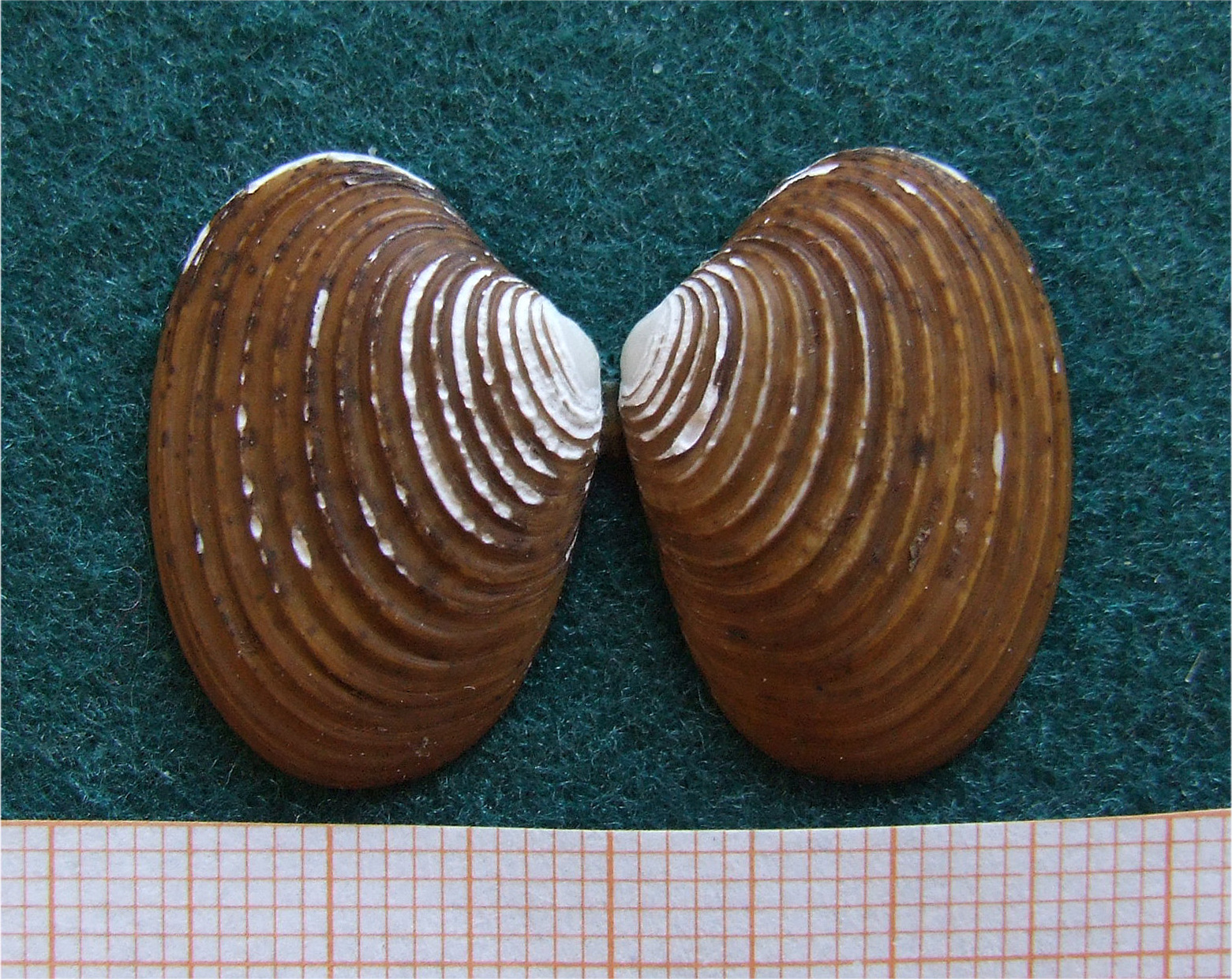
- Shell of a modern Astarte bivalve
  Astarte
  - †Astarte americana
  - †Astarte callosa
  - †Astarte proruta
  - †Astarte triangulata
  - †Astarte triangulatoides
- Asthenotoma
  - †Asthenotoma strigosa
- Astrangia
  - †Astrangia wilcoxensis – type locality for species
- Astyris
  - †Astyris crassus
  - †Astyris subfaxa – or unidentified comparable form
  - †Astyris subfraxa
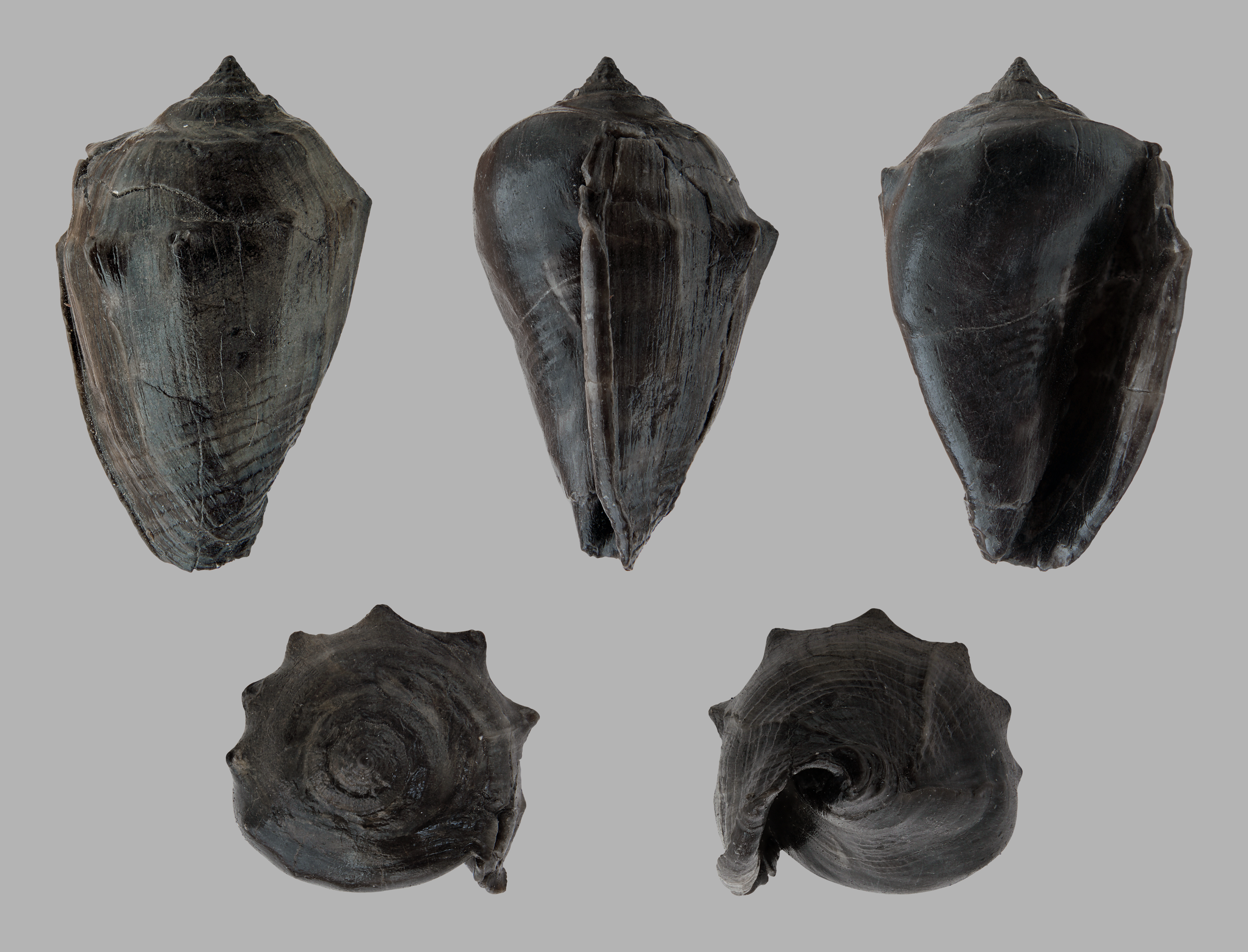
- Multiple views of a fossilized shell of the volute sea snail Athleta
  Athleta
  - †Athleta haleanus
  - †Athleta limopsis
  - †Athleta lisbonensis
  - †Athleta petrosa
  - †Athleta rugatus
  - †Athleta sayanus
  - †Athleta tuomeyi
- Atrina
  - †Atrina cawcawensis
  - †Atrina jacksoniana
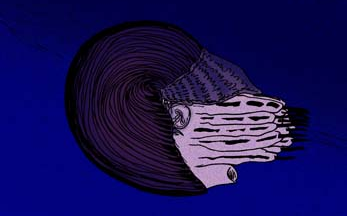
- Restoration of the Paleocene-Miocene nautiloid cephalopod Aturia
  †Aturia
  - †Aturia alabamensis
- Atys
  - †Atys claibornensis
  - †Atys meyeri
  - †Atys robustoides
- Aythya
  - †Aythya collaris
  - †Aythya valisineria – or unidentified comparable form

== B ==
- Bactridium
  - †Bactridium teges
- †Baculites
- Bairdia
  - †Bairdia gosportensis – type locality for species
- Bairdoppilata
- †Balanophylla
  - †Balanophylla haleana
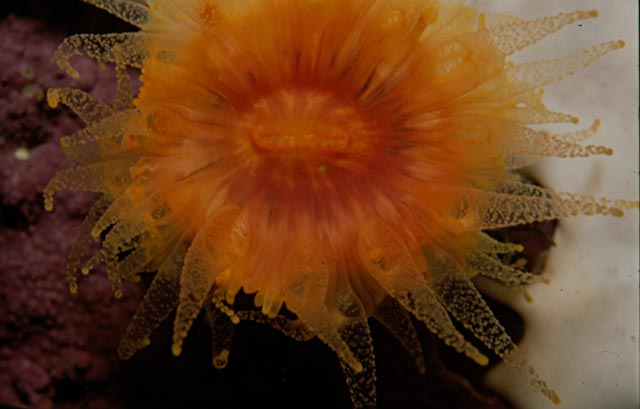
- A living Balanophyllia stony coral
  Balanophyllia
  - †Balanophyllia annularis – type locality for species
  - †Balanophyllia augustinensis
  - †Balanophyllia demophyllum
  - †Balanophyllia desmophyllum
  - †Balanophyllia elaborata
  - †Balanophyllia haleana
  - †Balanophyllia ponderosa – type locality for species
- Balanus
- Balcis
  - †Balcis aciculata
  - †Balcis claibornia
  - †Balcis notata
  - †Balcis wheeleri
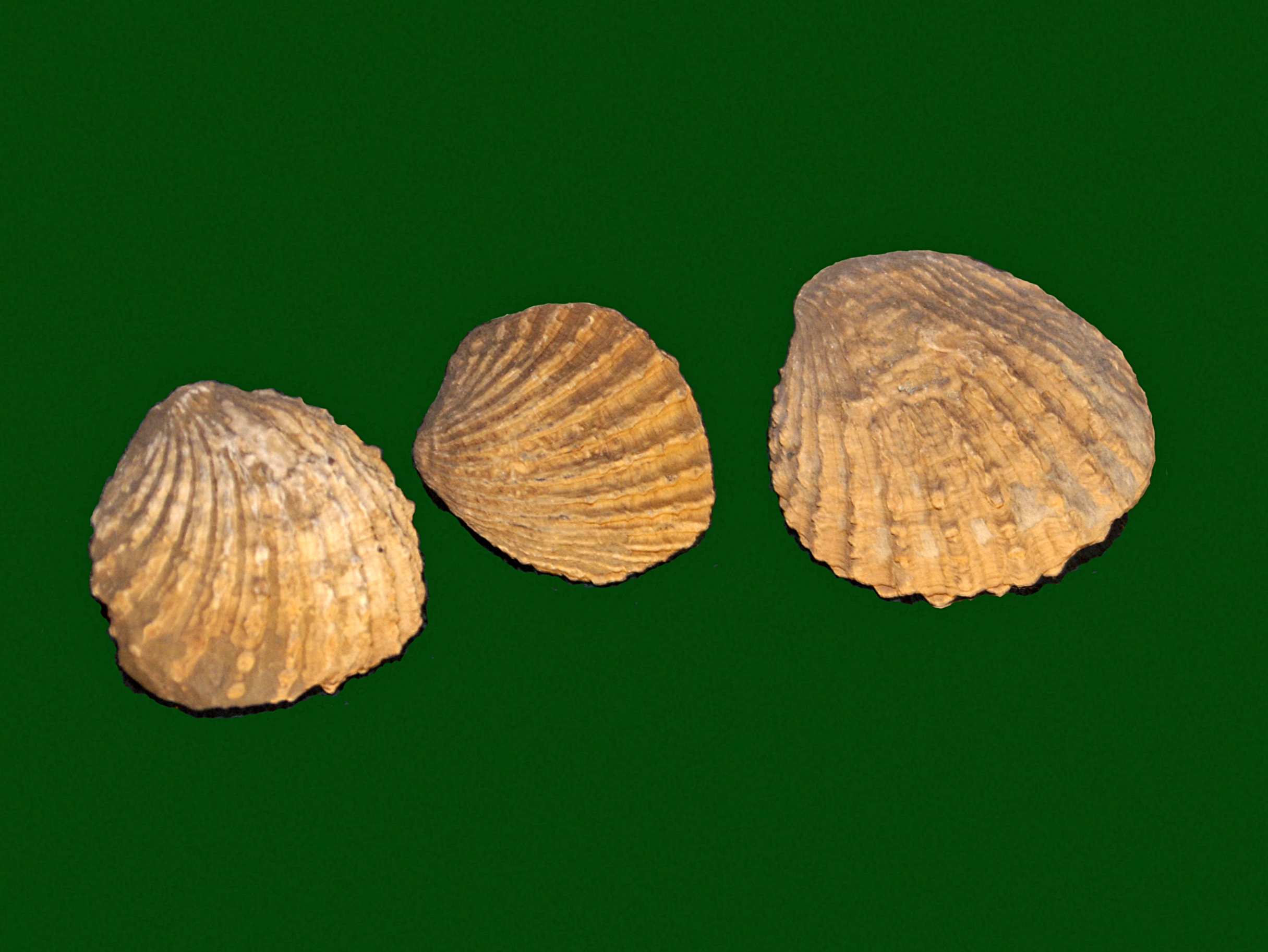
- Three fossilized shells of the Late Cretaceous-Eocene marine bivalve Baluchicardia
  †Baluchicardia
  - †Baluchicardia greggiana
  - †Baluchicardia wilcoxensis
- Barbatia
  - †Barbatia aspera
  - †Barbatia cuculloides
  - †Barbatia lignitifera
  - †Barbatia ludoviciana
- Barnea
  - †Barnea alatoidea
- Bartramia
  - †Bartramia longicauda
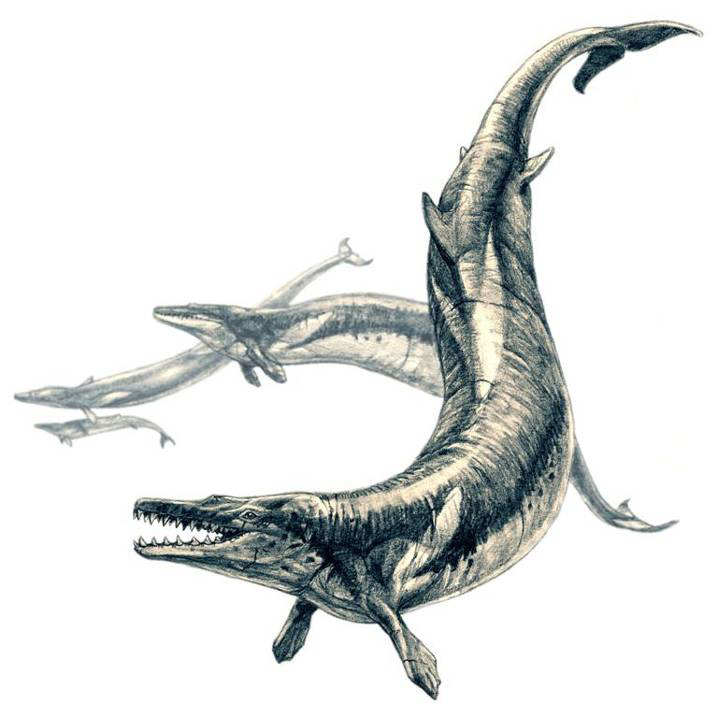
- Life restoration of a pod of the Eocene whale Basilosaurus
  †Basilosaurus
  - †Basilosaurus cetoides
- Basterotia
  - †Basterotia prima
- †Bathosella
  - †Bathosella undata – tentative report
- Bathytoma
  - †Bathytoma congesta
  - †Bathytoma marieana
  - †Bathytoma nonplicata – or unidentified comparable form
- Bathytormus
  - †Bathytormus clarkensis
  - †Bathytormus flexurus
  - †Bathytormus protextus
- †Bauzaia
  - †Bauzaia mucronata – type locality for species
- †Bayania
  - †Bayania claibornensis
  - †Bayania secale
- Beisselina
  - †Beisselina trulla
- †Belemnosella
  - †Belemnosella floweri
- †Bellatara
  - †Bellatara floridana
- †Belosaepia
  - †Belosaepia alabamensis
  - †Belosaepia harrisi
  - †Belosaepia saccaria
  - †Belosaepia uncinata
  - †Belosaepia ungula
  - †Belosaepia veatchi
- Bison
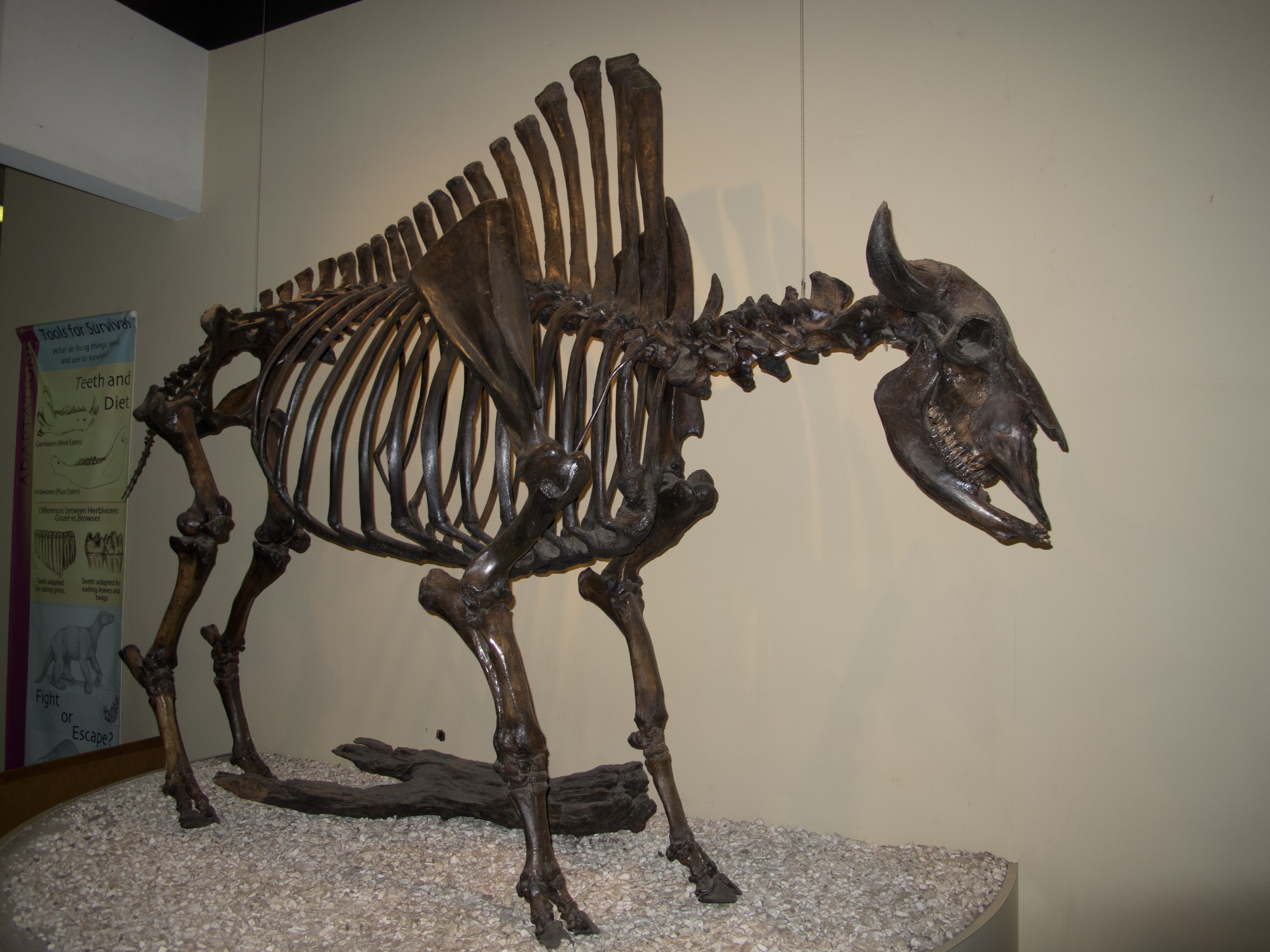
  - Mounted fossilized skeleton of the Pleistocene Bison antiquus, or ancient bison
    †Bison antiquus
- Bittium
  - †Bittium anita
  - †Bittium elegans
  - †Bittium estellense
- Blarina
  - †Blarina carolinensis
- †Bolis
  - †Bolis enterogramma
  - †Bolis lisboa
- Bonasa
  - †Bonasa umbellus
- †Bonellitia
  - †Bonellitia annosa
  - †Bonellitia bastropensis
  - †Bonellitia elevata
  - †Bonellitia graciloides
  - †Bonellitia parilis
  - †Bonellitia silvaerupis
  - †Bonellitia tortiplica
- Bornia
  - †Bornia plectopygia
  - †Bornia prima
  - †Bornia scintillata
- Botula
  - †Botula carolinensis
- Brachidontes
  - †Brachidontes alabamensis
  - †Brachidontes stubbsi
- †Brachycythere
  - †Brachycythere martini
  - †Brachycythere mississippiensis
  - †Brachycythere watervalleyensis
- Brachydontes – tentative report
- Branta
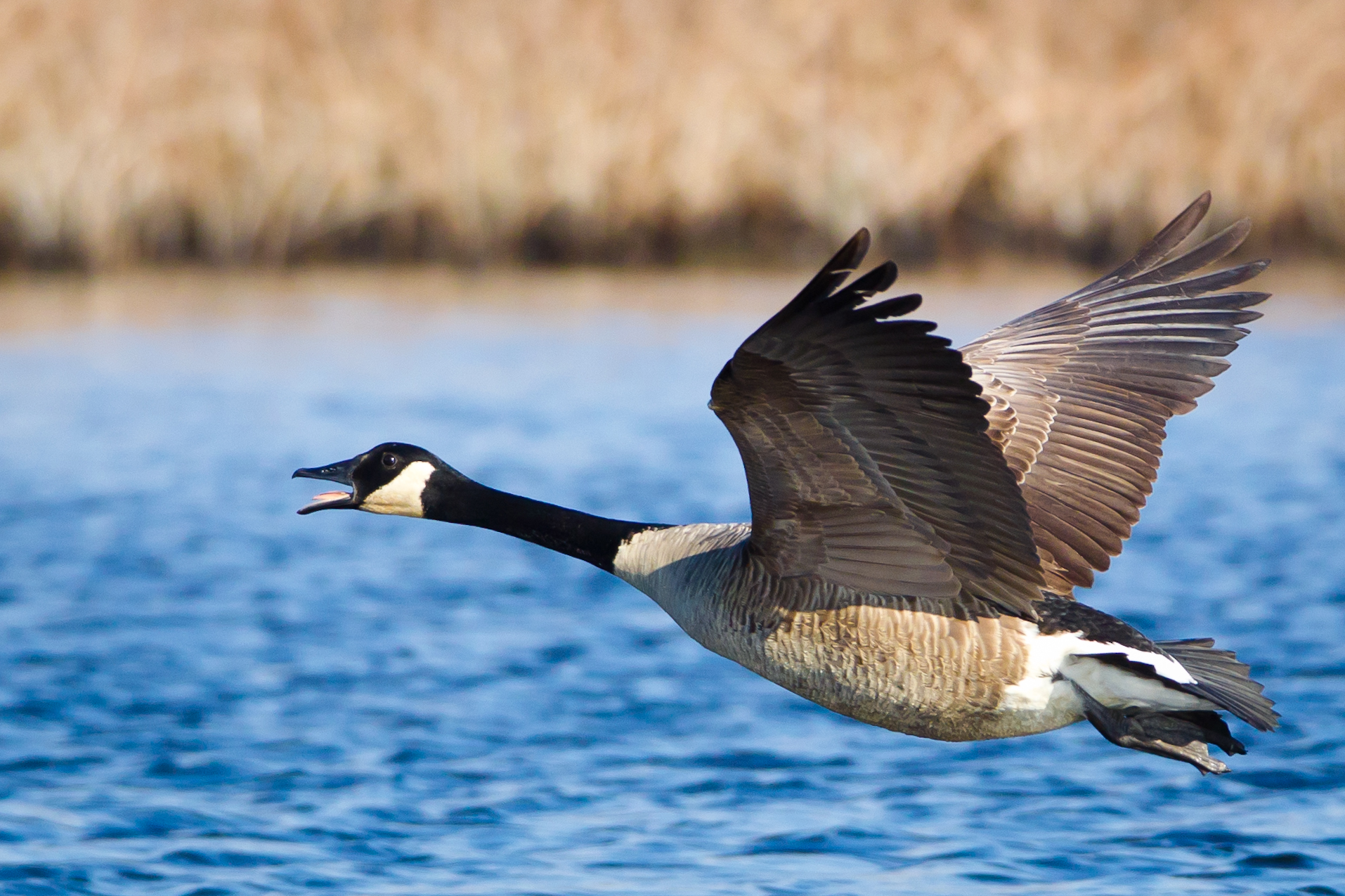
  - A living Branta canadensis, or Canada goose
    †Branta canadensis
- †Brazosiella
  - †Brazosiella kokeni
  - †Brazosiella moseleyi
- †Brissopatagus
  - †Brissopatagus alabamensis
- †Bristocorbula
  - †Bristocorbula fossata
- †Buffonellaria
  - †Buffonellaria entomostoma
- Bufo
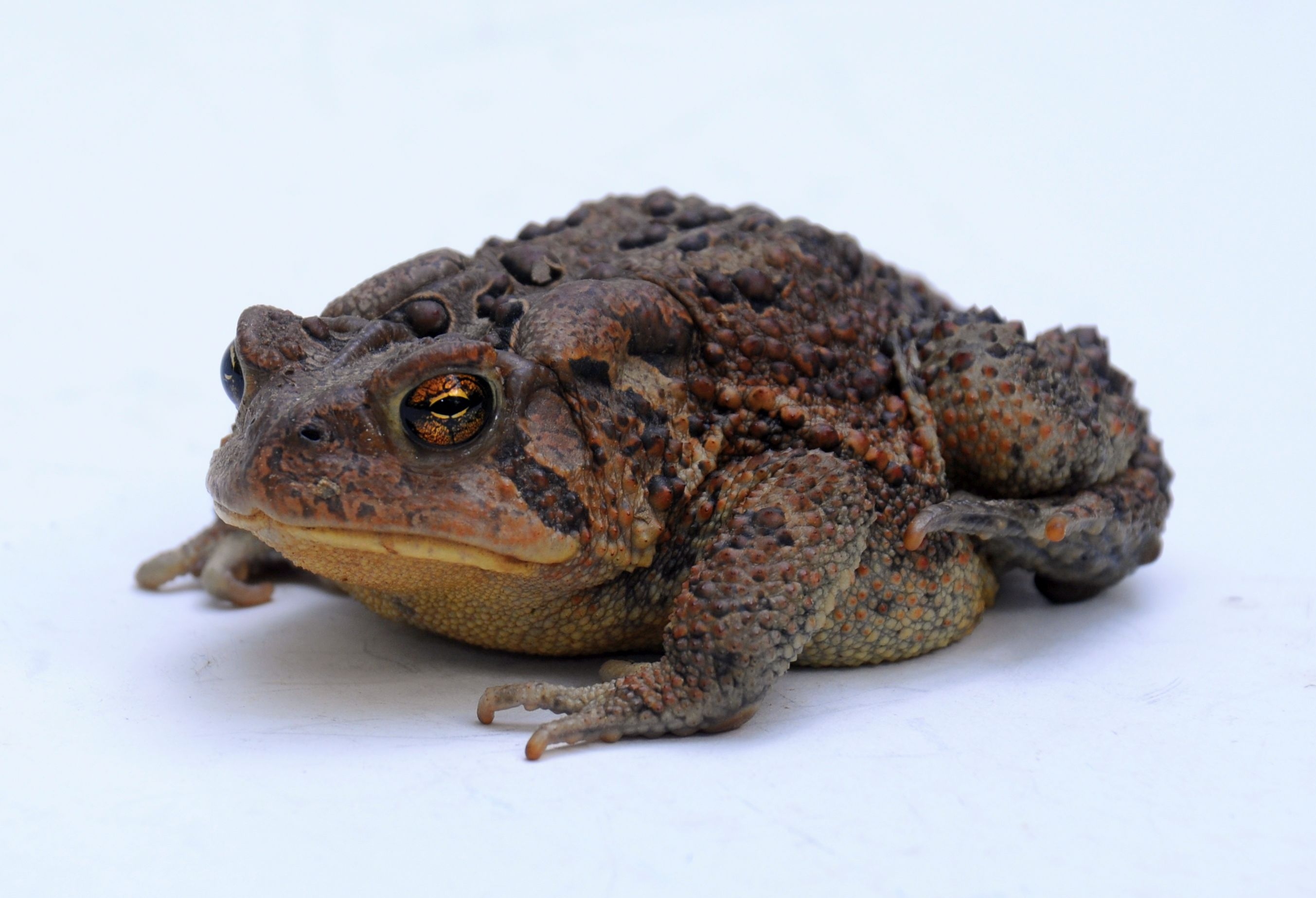
  - A living Anaxyrus americanus (formerly Bufo americanus), or American toad
    †Bufo americanus
  - †Bufo woodhousei
- Bullia
  - †Bullia altilis
  - †Bullia calli
  - †Bullia calluspira
  - †Bullia ellipticum
  - †Bullia priamopse
  - †Bullia scamba
  - †Bullia tenera
  - †Bullia tuomeyi
- †Bulliopsis
  - †Bulliopsis choctavensis
- †Bulovia
  - †Bulovia weisbordi – tentative report
- Buntonia
  - †Buntonia shubutaensis
- †Burnhamia
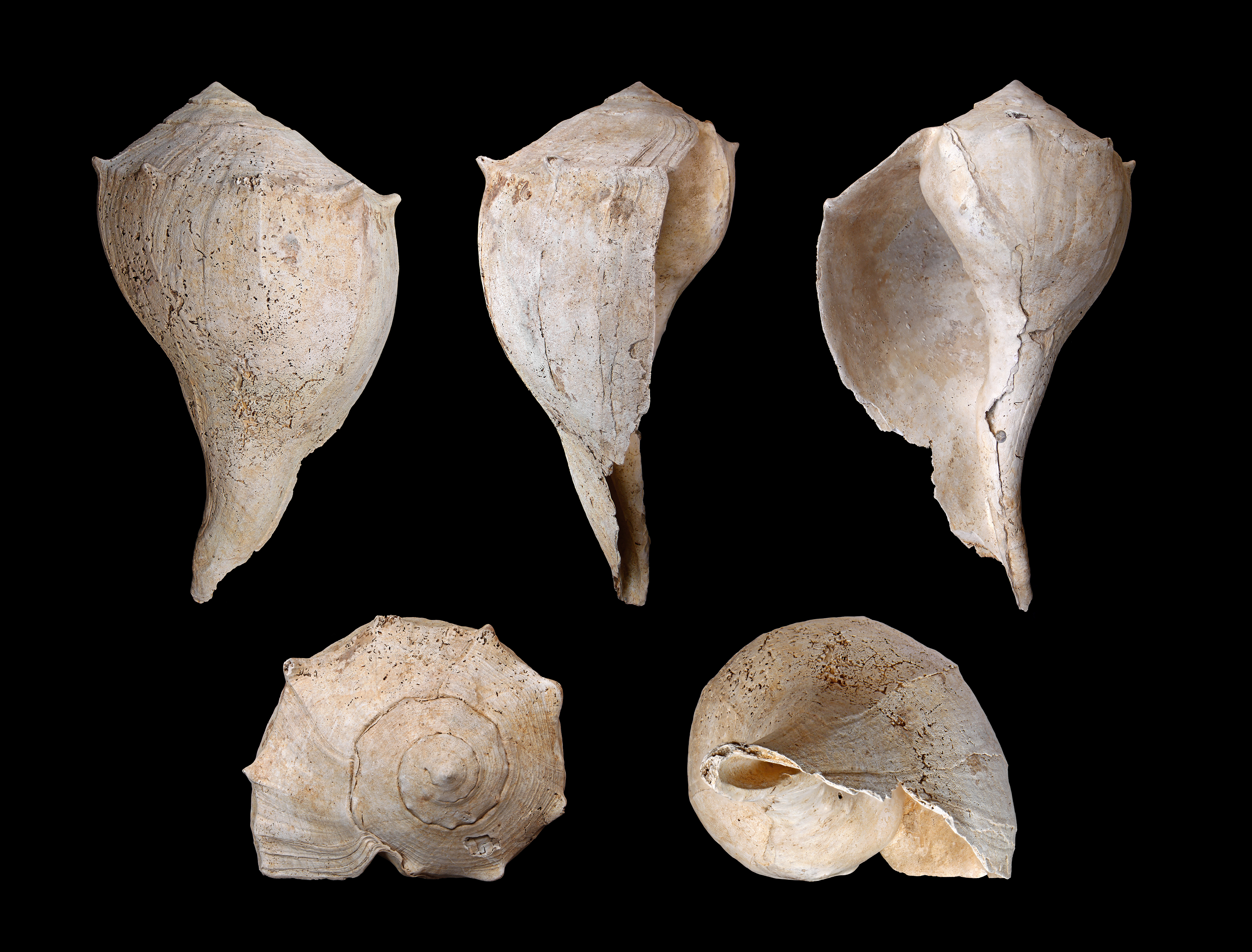
- Fossilized shell in multiple views of a Busycon sea snail
  Busycon

== C ==
- Caberea
  - †Caberea boryi
- Cadulus
  - †Cadulus abruptus
  - †Cadulus depressus
  - †Cadulus turgidus
- Caestocorbula
  - †Caestocorbula fossata
  - †Caestocorbula murchisonii
  - †Caestocorbula wailesiana
- Callianassa
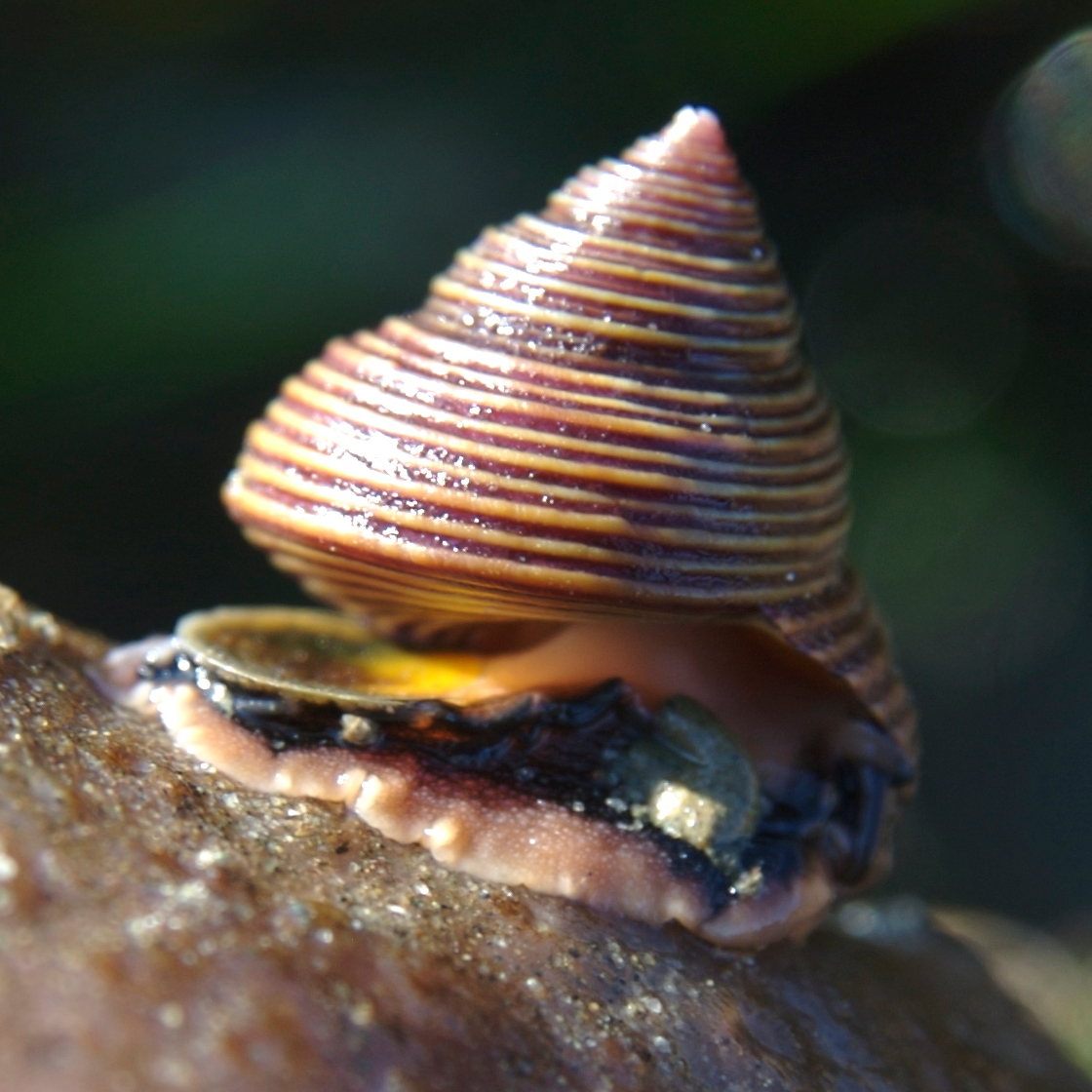
- A living Calliostoma top sea snail
  Calliostoma
  - †Calliostoma claibornianum
- Callista
  - †Callista aldrichi
  - †Callista annexa
  - †Callista lisbonensis
  - †Callista perovata
- Callopora
  - †Callopora vicina – type locality for species
- Callucina
  - †Callucina papyracea
- †Calorhadia
  - †Calorhadia aldrichiana
  - †Calorhadia bella
  - †Calorhadia compsa
  - †Calorhadia elongatoidea
  - †Calorhadia equalis
  - †Calorhadia opulenta
  - †Calorhadia pharcida
  - †Calorhadia semen
  - †Calorhadia semenoides
- Calyptraea
- †Calyptraphorus
  - †Calyptraphorus aldrichi
  - †Calyptraphorus compressus
  - †Calyptraphorus stamineus
  - †Calyptraphorus trinodiferus
  - †Calyptraphorus velatus
- Campanile
  - †Campanile claytonense
- Cancellaria
  - †Cancellaria alveata
  - †Cancellaria costata
  - †Cancellaria panones
- †Cancelrana
  - †Cancelrana lanceolata
- Canis
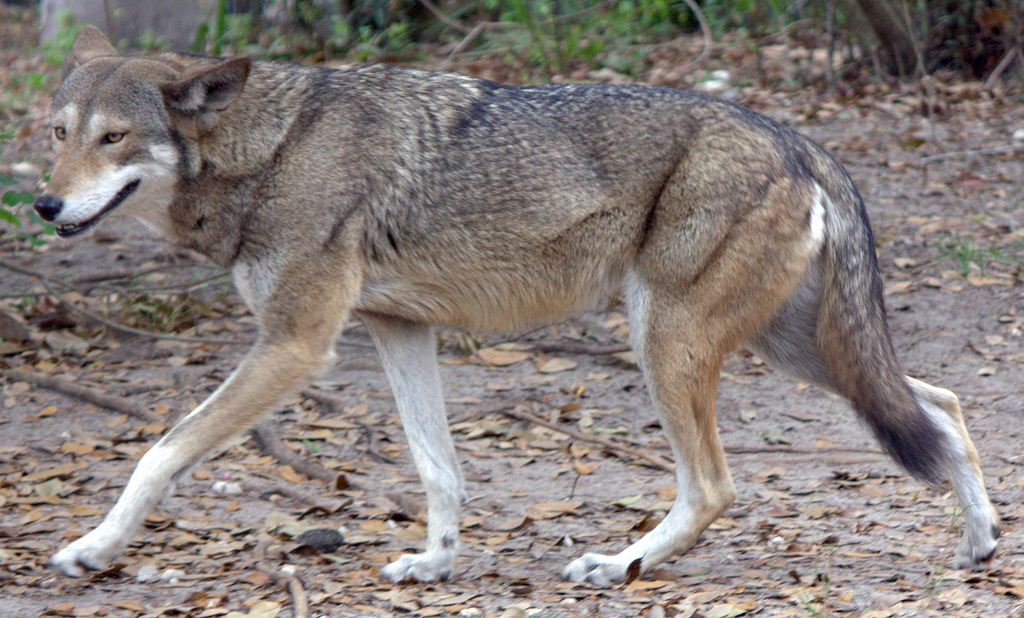
  - A living Canis rufus, or red wolf
    †Canis rufus
- Cantharus
  - †Cantharus elegantissimus
  - †Cantharus johnsoni
- Capulus
  - †Capulus expansus
- Carcharhinus
  - †Carcharhinus gibbesi
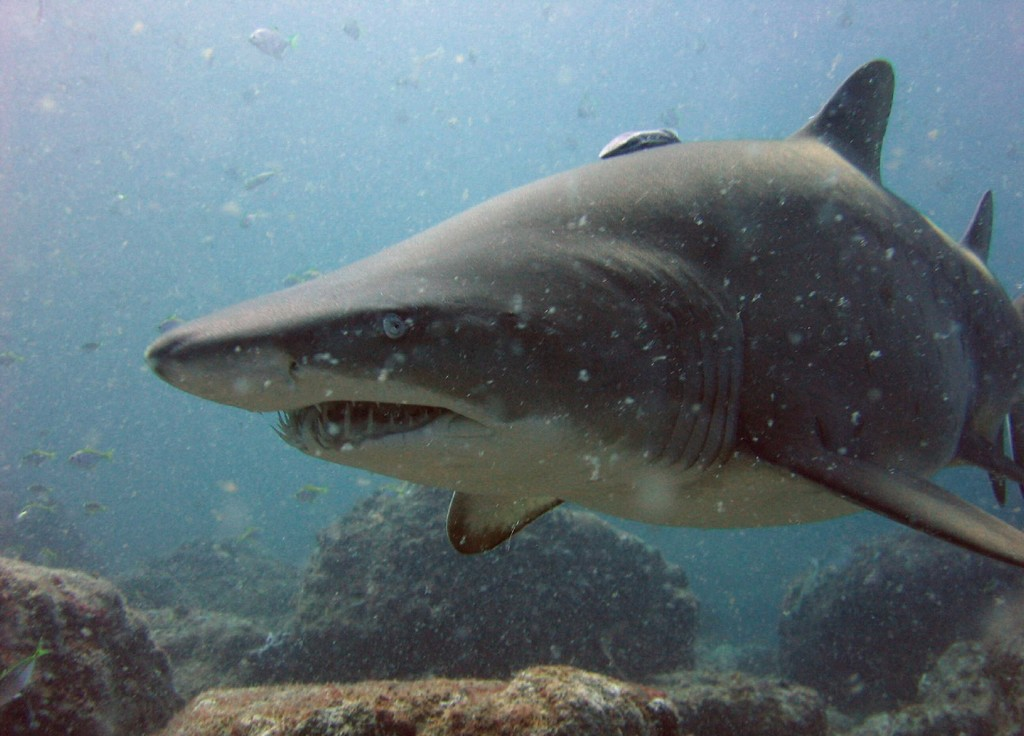
- A living Carcharias sand tiger shark
  Carcharias
  - †Carcharias hopei
- †Carditella
  - †Carditella aldrichi
- Cardium – report made of unidentified related form or using admittedly obsolete nomenclature; see Cerastoderma
- †Caricella
  - †Caricella bolaris
  - †Caricella cherokeensis
  - †Caricella claibornensis
  - †Caricella demissa
  - †Caricella doliata
  - †Caricella dolita
  - †Caricella heilprini
  - †Caricella leana
  - †Caricella ludoviciana
  - †Caricella podagrina
  - †Caricella praetenuis
  - †Caricella pyruloides
  - †Caricella stenzeli
- Carphophis
  - †Carphophis anoenus
- Caryocorbula
  - †Caryocorbula coloradoensis
  - †Caryocorbula densata
  - †Caryocorbula deshayesii
  - †Caryocorbula deusseni
  - †Caryocorbula willistoni
- Caryophyllia
  - †Caryophyllia mcglameryae – type locality for species
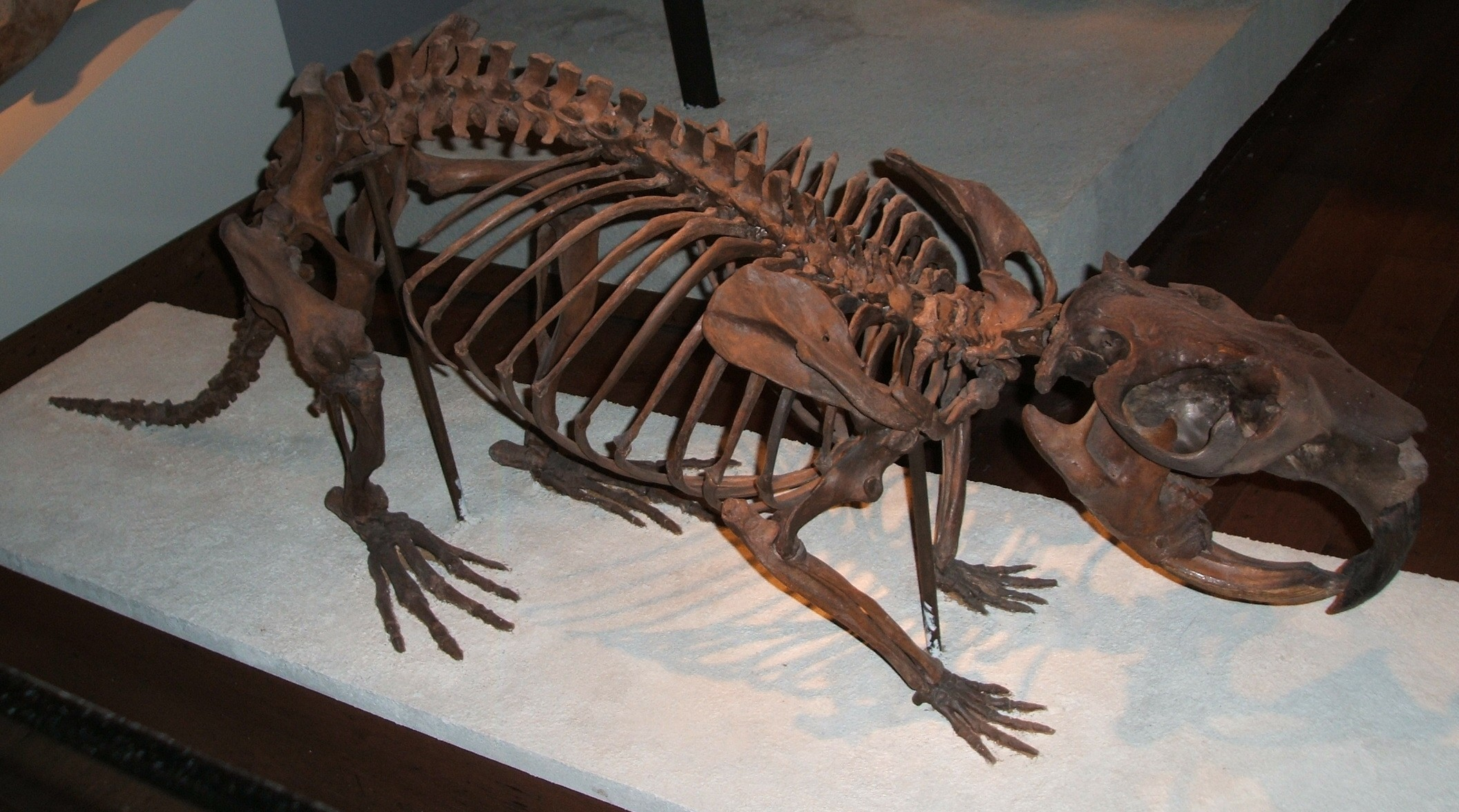
- Mounted fossilized skeleton of the Pliocene-Pleistocene giant beaver Castoroides
  †Castoroides
- †Catenicella
  - †Catenicella subseptentrionalis
- Catoptrophorus
  - †Catoptrophorus semipalmatus
- Cavilinga
  - †Cavilinga amica
- Celleporaria
  - †Celleporaria damicornis
  - †Celleporaria fissurata
  - †Celleporaria granulosa
  - †Celleporaria orbiculifera
  - †Celleporaria seposita – type locality for species
- Celleporina
  - †Celleporina globosa
  - †Celleporina umbonata
- Centroberyx
- †Ceriopora
  - †Ceriopora vesiculosa
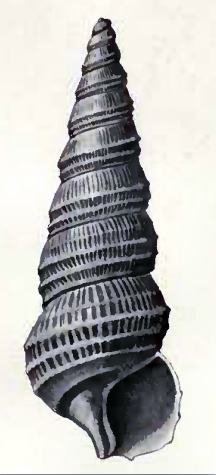
- Illustration of a shell of a Cerithiella cerith sea snail
  Cerithiella
  - †Cerithiella chamberlaini
  - †Cerithiella delicatula
  - †Cerithiella fluviatilis
  - †Cerithiella nassula
  - †Cerithiella preconica
  - †Cerithiella regularoides
  - †Cerithiella terebropsis
- †Cerithioderma
  - †Cerithioderma primum
- Cerithiopsis
  - †Cerithiopsis dalli
  - †Cerithiopsis greggiensis
  - †Cerithiopsis solitaria
- Cerithium – report made of unidentified related form or using admittedly obsolete nomenclature
  - †Cerithium agnotum
  - †Cerithium claibornense
  - †Cerithium tombigbeense
- Cervus
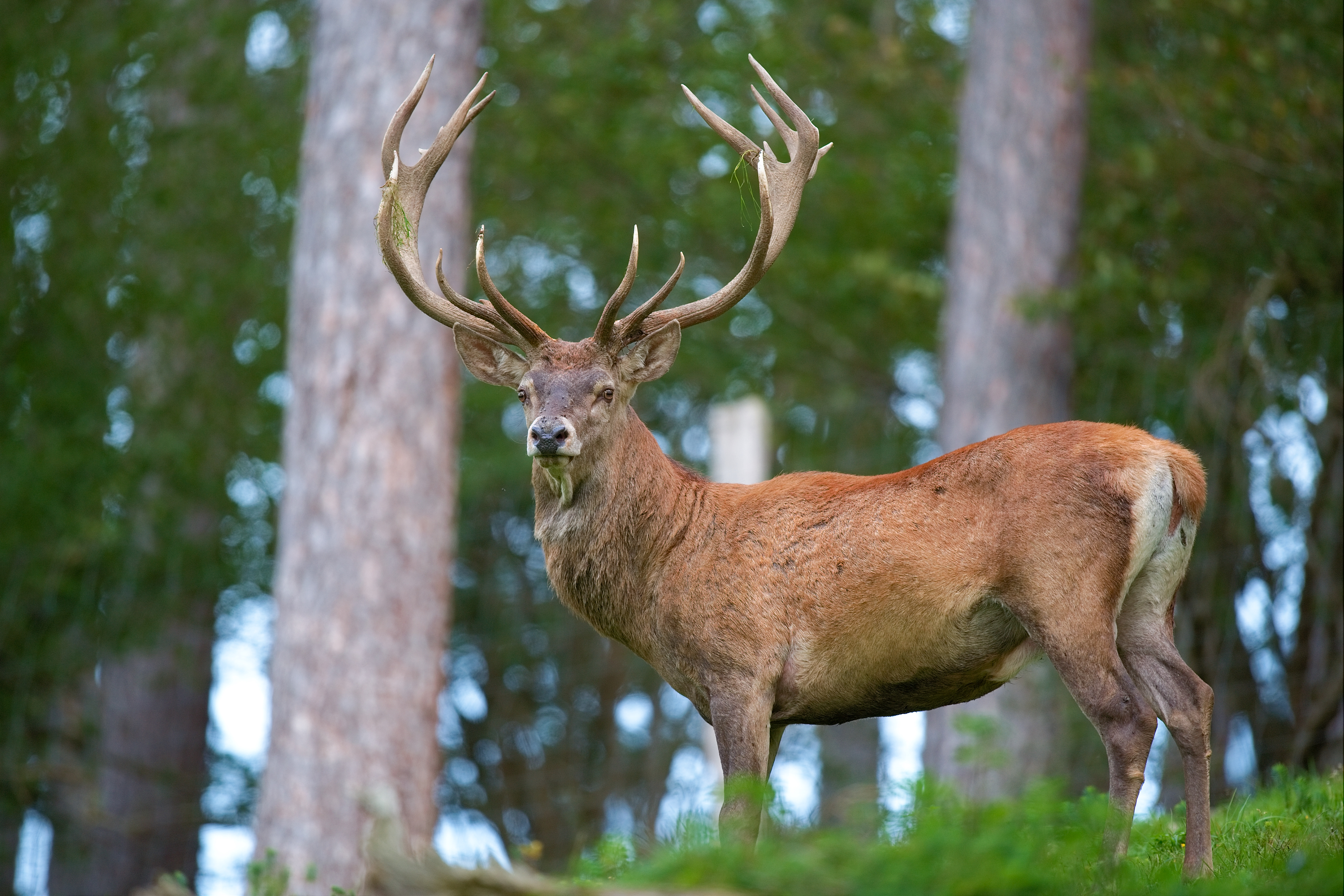
  - A living Cervus elaphus, or red deer
    †Cervus elaphus
- Chama
  - †Chama monroensis
- Charonia
  - †Charonia showalteri
- Cheiloporina
  - †Cheiloporina saillans
- Chiton
  - †Chiton eocenensis
  - †Chiton prostremus
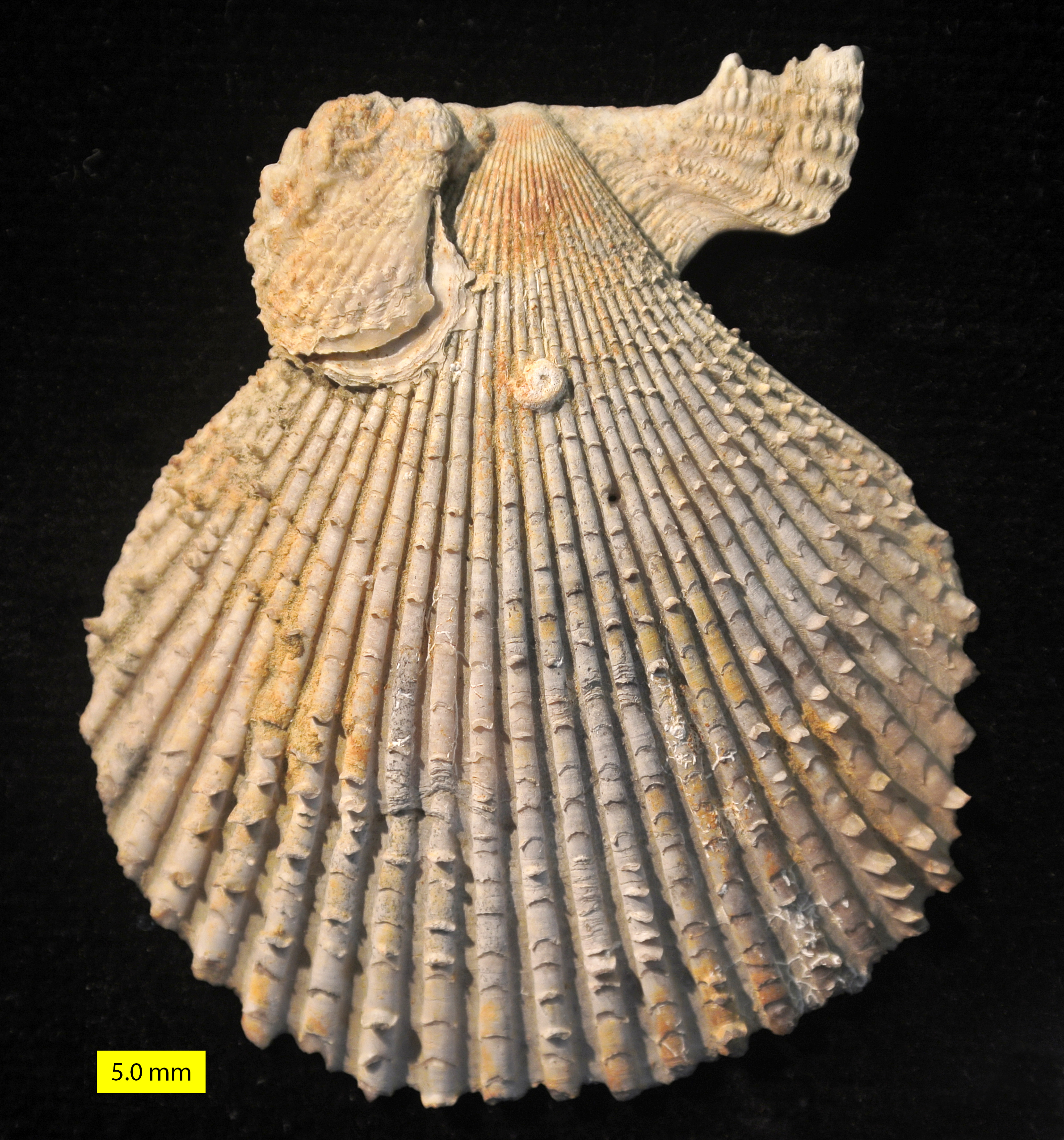
- Fossillized shell of a Chlamys bivalve
  Chlamys
  - †Chlamys anatipes
  - †Chlamys beverlyi
  - †Chlamys cainei
  - †Chlamys cawcawensis
  - †Chlamys chickaria
  - †Chlamys choctavensis
  - †Chlamys clarkeana
  - †Chlamys clinchfieldensis
  - †Chlamys danvillensis
  - †Chlamys dennisoni
  - †Chlamys deshayesi
  - †Chlamys deshayesii
  - †Chlamys gainstownensis
  - †Chlamys glendonensis
  - †Chlamys howei
  - †Chlamys mcquirti
  - †Chlamys nupera
  - †Chlamys spillmani
  - †Chlamys wahtubbeana
- †Chlorophthalmidarum – report made of unidentified related form or using admittedly obsolete nomenclature
  - †Chlorophthalmidarum postangulatus – type locality for species
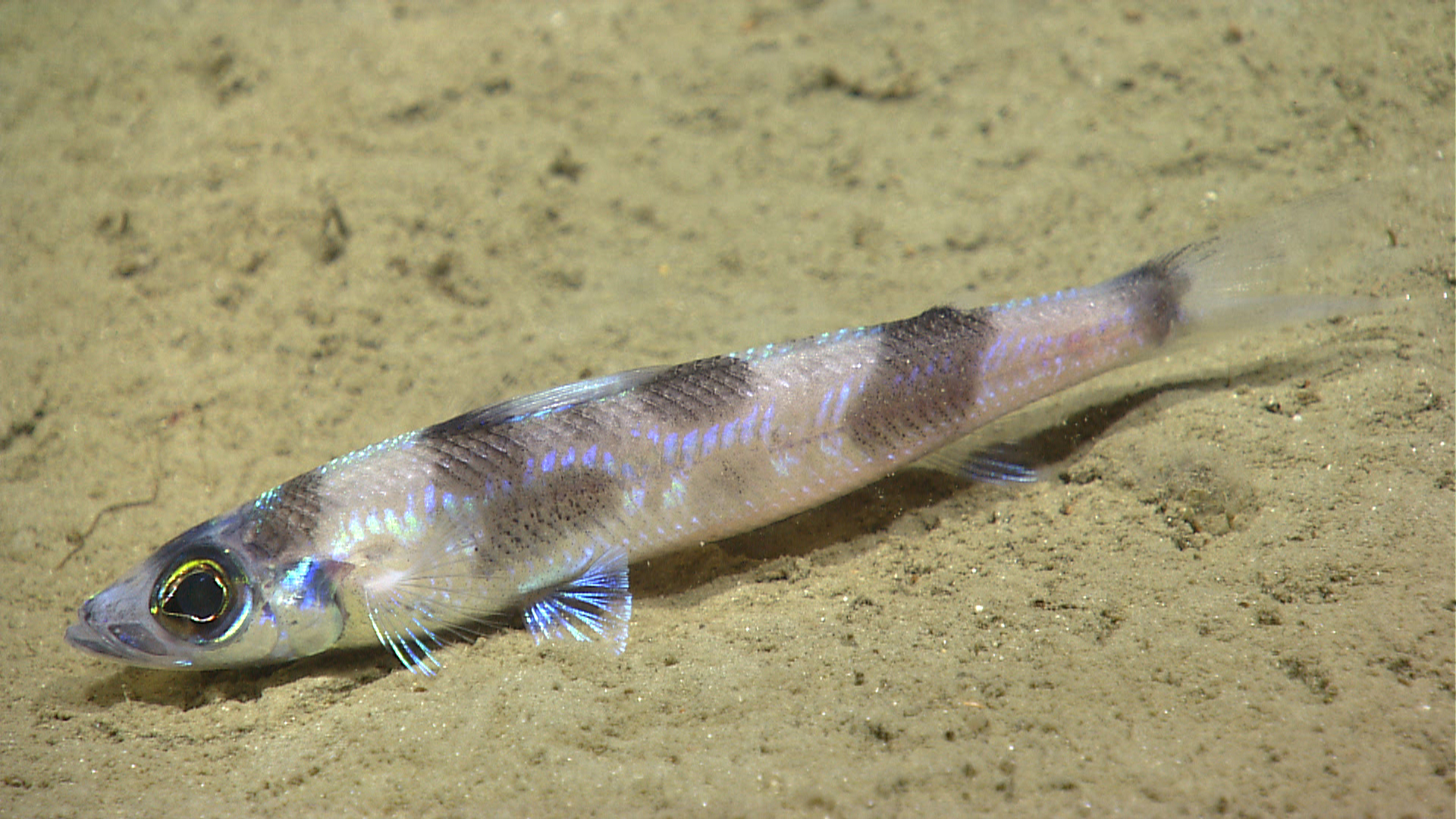
- A living Chlorophthalmus greeneye fish
  †Chlorophthalmus – report made of unidentified related form or using admittedly obsolete nomenclature
  - †Chlorophthalmus postangulatus – type locality for species
- Chrysemys
  - †Chrysemys picta
- †Chrysodomus – report made of unidentified related form or using admittedly obsolete nomenclature
  - †Chrysodomus striatus
- Cibicides
  - †Cibicides lobatulus
- Cidaris
  - †Cidaris pratti
  - †Cidaris spendens – or unidentified related form
  - †Cidaris splendens
- †Cimomia
  - †Cimomia haltomi
  - †Cimomia subrecta
  - †Cimomia vaughani
- †Cirsochilus
  - †Cirsochilus claibornense
  - †Cirsochilus lineatum
- Cirsotrema
  - †Cirsotrema claibornense
  - †Cirsotrema creolum
  - †Cirsotrema danvillense
  - †Cirsotrema linteum
  - †Cirsotrema nassulum
  - †Cirsotrema ranellinum
- Clava – or unidentified comparable form
  - †Clava globoleve
- Clavatula – report made of unidentified related form or using admittedly obsolete nomenclature
  - †Clavatula tupis
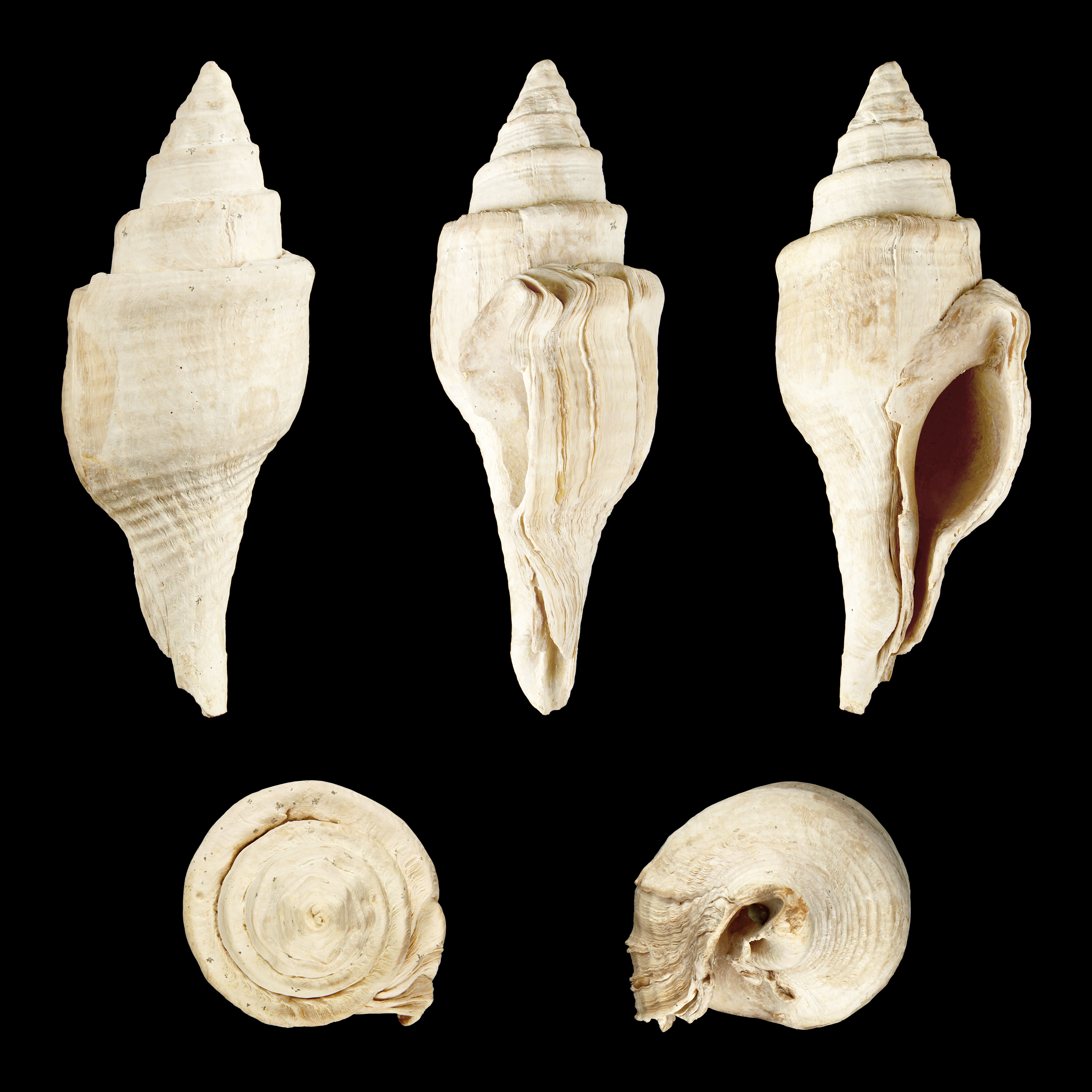
- Multiple views of a fossilized shell of the Paleocene-Pliocene spindle sea snail Clavilithes
  Clavilithes
  - †Clavilithes hubbardanus
  - †Clavilithes humerosus
  - †Clavilithes kennedyanus
  - †Clavilithes pachyleurus
  - †Clavilithes penrosei
  - †Clavilithes protextus
  - †Clavilithes raphanoides
  - †Clavilithes samsoni
- Clavus
  - †Clavus lonsdallii
  - †Clavus pulchreconcha
  - †Clavus solitariuscula
  - †Clavus surculopsis
- Cliona
  - †Cliona microtuberum
- Clithrocytheridea
  - †Clithrocytheridea caldwellensis
  - †Clithrocytheridea garretti
  - †Clithrocytheridea grigsbyi
  - †Clithrocytheridea shubutensis
- Closia
  - †Closia larvata
  - †Closia plicata
  - †Closia semen
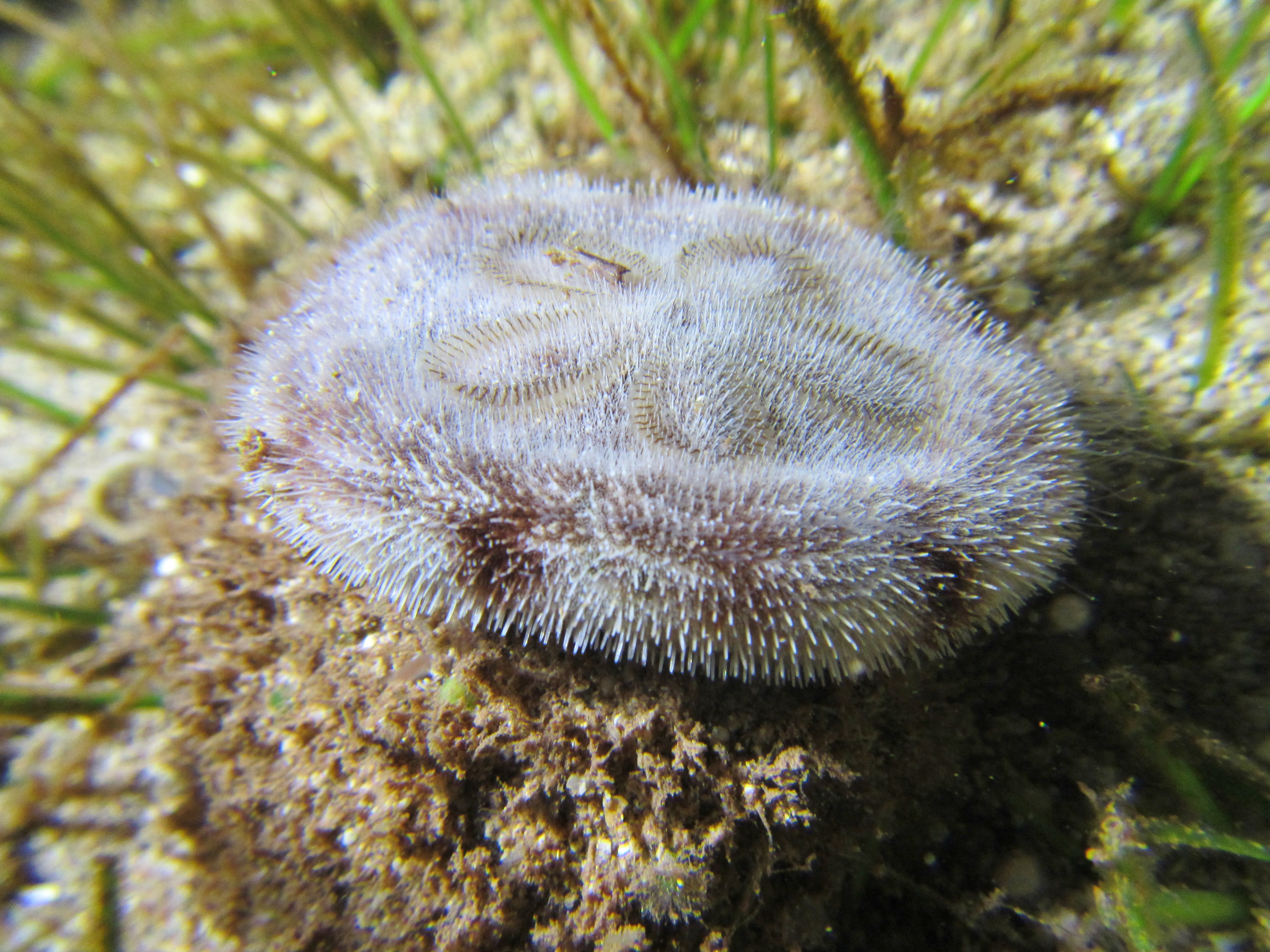
- A living Clypeaster, or sea biscuit
  Clypeaster
  - †Clypeaster rogersi
- Cochlespira
  - †Cochlespira bella
  - †Cochlespira engonata
  - †Cochlespira greggi
- †Cochlespirella
  - †Cochlespirella nana
- Codakia – tentative report
  - †Codakia claytonia
  - †Codakia symmetrica
- Colinus
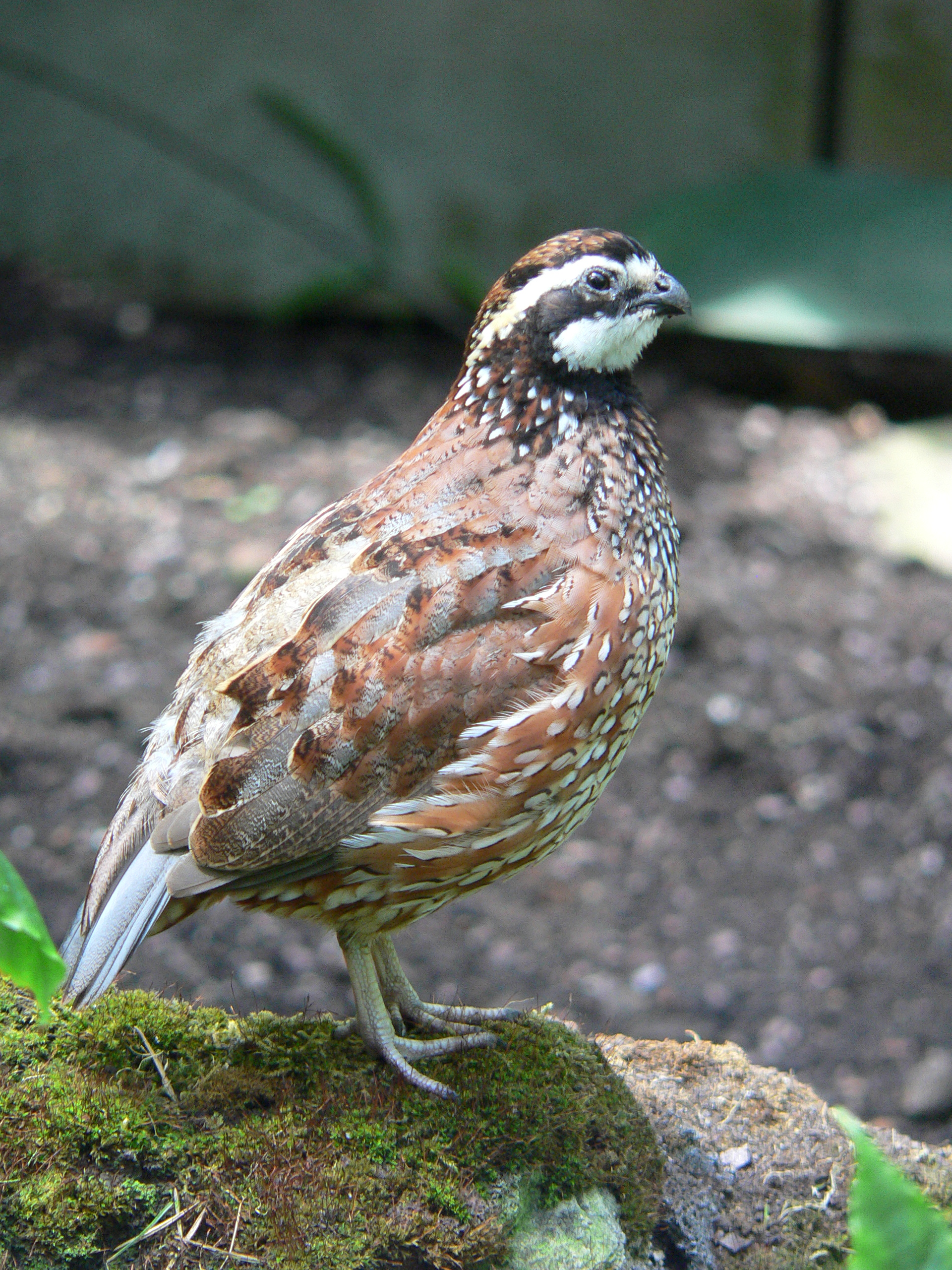
  - A living Colinus virginianus, or northern bobwhite
    †Colinus virginianus
- Coluber
  - †Coluber constrictor
- Columbellopsis
  - †Columbellopsis elevata
  - †Columbellopsis mississippiensis
- †Congeris
  - †Congeris brevior
- †Congridarum – report made of unidentified related form or using admittedly obsolete nomenclature
- Conomitra
  - †Conomitra fusoides
  - †Conomitra texana
  - †Conomitra traceyi
- Conopeum
  - †Conopeum arborescens
  - †Conopeum similior – type locality for species
  - †Conopeum wilcoxianicum – type locality for species
- †Conorbis
  - †Conorbis conoides
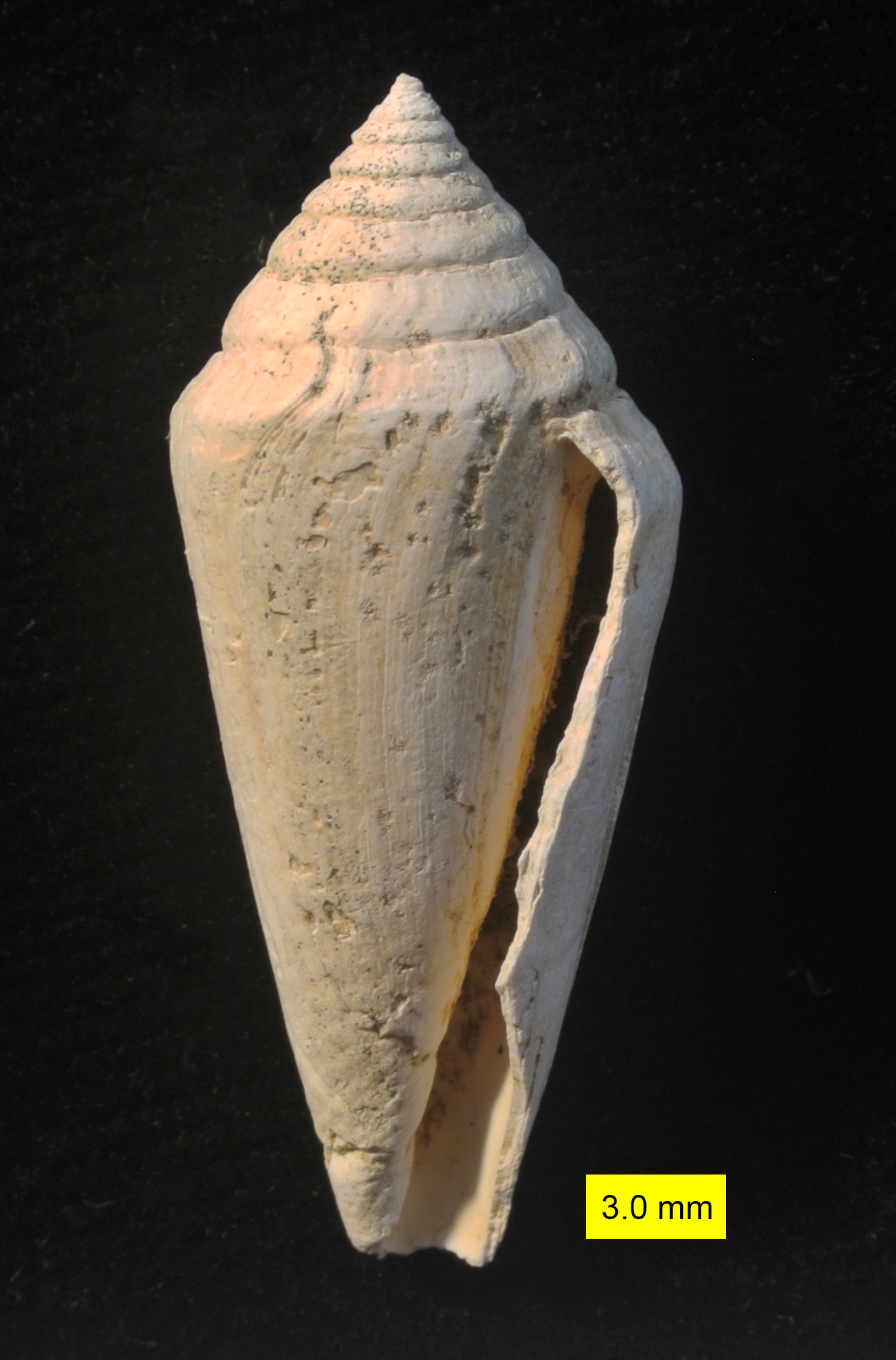
- Fossilized shell of a Conus cone snail
  Conus
  - †Conus granopsis
  - †Conus improvidus
  - †Conus sauridens
  - †Conus smithvillensis
- †Coptostoma
  - †Coptostoma rameum
- Coralliophaga
  - †Coralliophaga claibornensis
  - †Coralliophaga prima
- Corbicula – tentative report
  - †Corbicula cornelliana
- Corbula
  - †Corbula alabamiensis
  - †Corbula compressa
  - †Corbula concha
  - †Corbula extenuata
  - †Corbula milium
  - †Corbula subcompressa
- Cordieria
  - †Cordieria biconica
  - †Cordieria ludoviciana
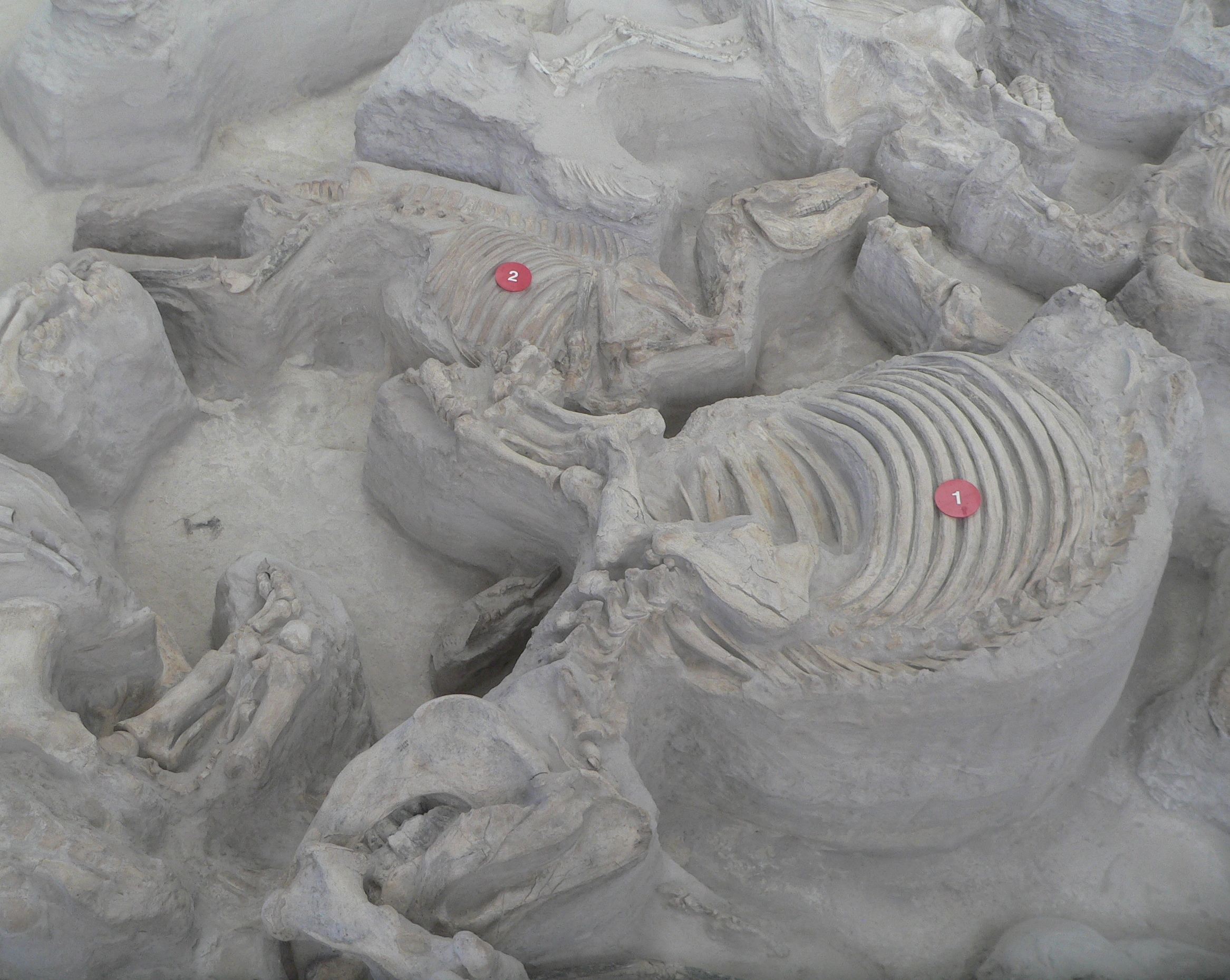
- Fossilized skeleton preserved in situ (upper left, 2) of the Miocene-Pliocene horse Cormohipparion
  †Cormohipparion
  - †Cormohipparion emsliei
- †Cornulina
  - †Cornulina armigera
  - †Cornulina hatchetigbeensis
  - †Cornulina minax
  - †Cornulina philadelphica
- †Coronia
  - †Coronia alternata
  - †Coronia casteri
  - †Coronia childreni
  - †Coronia lancea
  - †Coronia lerchi
  - †Coronia margaritosa
  - †Coronia mediavia
  - †Coronia nodoidea
- †Coronina
  - †Coronina childreni
- †Corvina
  - †Corvina gemma
  - †Corvina intermedia
- Corvus
  - †Corvus corax
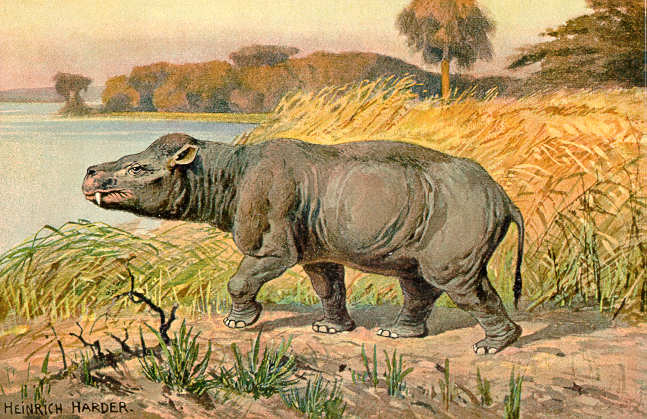
- Life restoration of the Paleocene-Eocene pantodont mammal Coryphodon. Heinrich Harder (1920).
  †Coryphodon
- Costacallista
  - †Costacallista aequorea
  - †Costacallista aldrichi
  - †Costacallista mortoni
- †Costazzia
  - †Costazzia antiqua – type locality for species
- †Crasinella
  - †Crasinella minor
- Crassatella
  - †Crassatella alta
  - †Crassatella aquiana
  - †Crassatella gabbi
  - †Crassatella ioannes
  - †Crassatella sepulcollis
  - †Crassatella texalta
  - †Crassatella trapaquara
  - †Crassatella trapoquara
  - †Crassatella tumidula
- Crassinella
  - †Crassinella minor
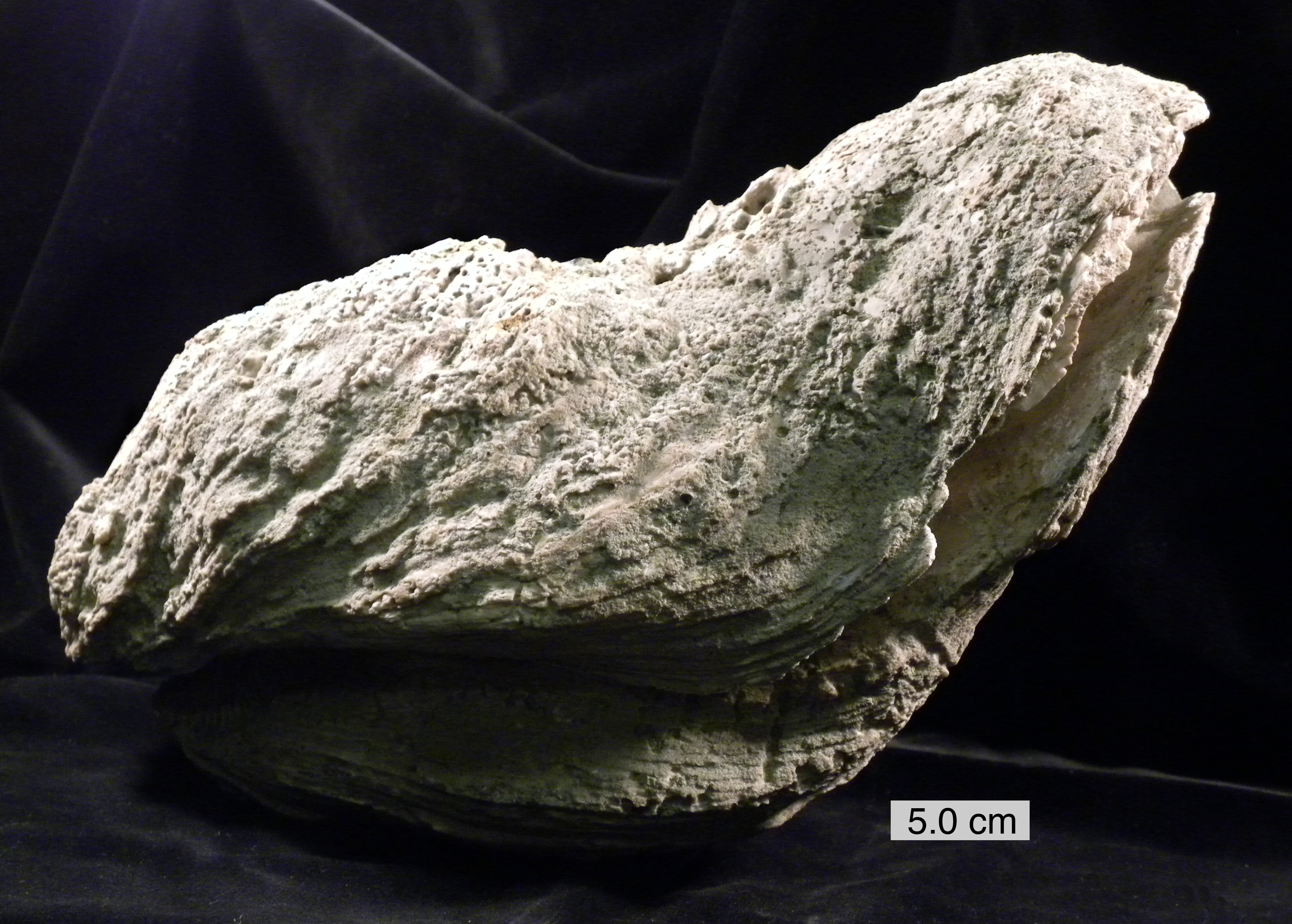
- Fossilized shell of the Cretaceous-modern oyster Crassostrea
  Crassostrea
  - †Crassostrea alabamiensis
- Crenella
  - †Crenella isocardioides
  - †Crenella latifrons
  - †Crenella margaritacea
- Crenilabium
  - †Crenilabium cossmanni
- Crepidula
  - †Crepidula dumosa
  - †Crepidula lirata
- Creseis
  - †Creseis elba
  - †Creseis nimba
- †Cricella
  - †Cricella leana
- Crisia
  - †Crisia hornesi
- Crisulipora
  - †Crisulipora grandipora – type locality for species
  - †Crisulipora promineus
  - †Crisulipora rugosodorsalis
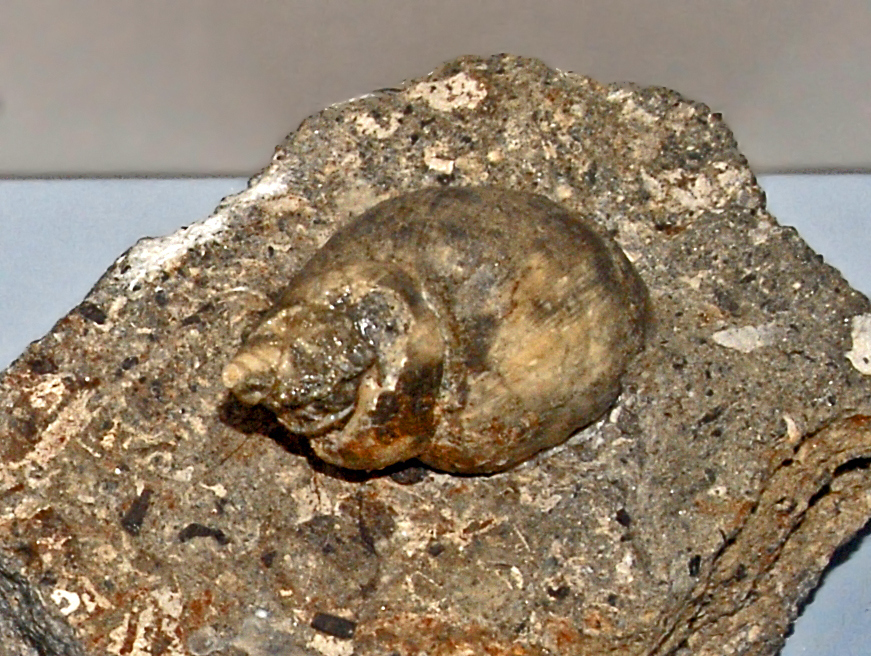
- Fossilized shell of the Paleocene-Eocene moon sea snail Crommium
  †Crommium
  - †Crommium perovatum
  - †Crommium tombigbeense
- Crotalus
  - †Crotalus horridus
- Cryptobranchus
  - †Cryptobranchus alleganiensis
- †Cryptochorda
  - †Cryptochorda clarkensis
  - †Cryptochorda mohri
- †Cubitostrea
  - †Cubitostrea divaricata
  - †Cubitostrea lisbonensis
  - †Cubitostrea perplicata
  - †Cubitostrea sellaeformis
  - †Cubitostrea smithvillensis
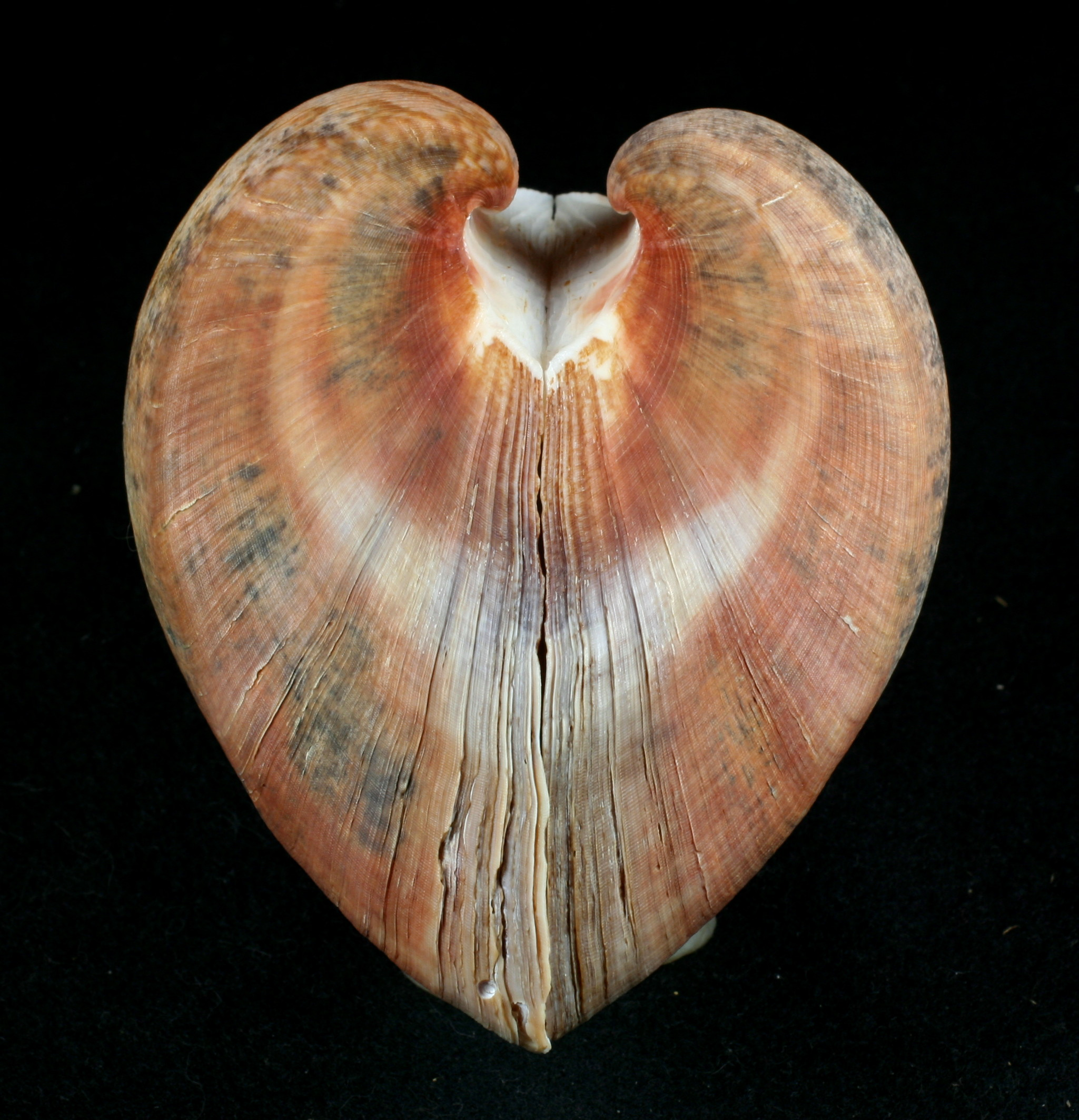
- Shell of a Cucullaea, or false ark shell
  Cucullaea
  - †Cucullaea gigantea
  - †Cucullaea macrodonta
  - †Cucullaea saffordi
- †Cucullaria
  - †Cucullaria aldrichi
  - †Cucullaria ozarkensis
- Cultellus
  - †Cultellus conradi
- Cuna
  - †Cuna monroensis
  - †Cuna parva
- †Cuneocorbula
  - †Cuneocorbula subengonata
- Cushmanidea
  - †Cushmanidea keyserensis
  - †Cushmanidea papula
  - †Cushmanidea serangodes
- Cuspidaria
  - †Cuspidaria attenuata
  - †Cuspidaria prima
- †Cyamocytheridea
  - †Cyamocytheridea watervallensis
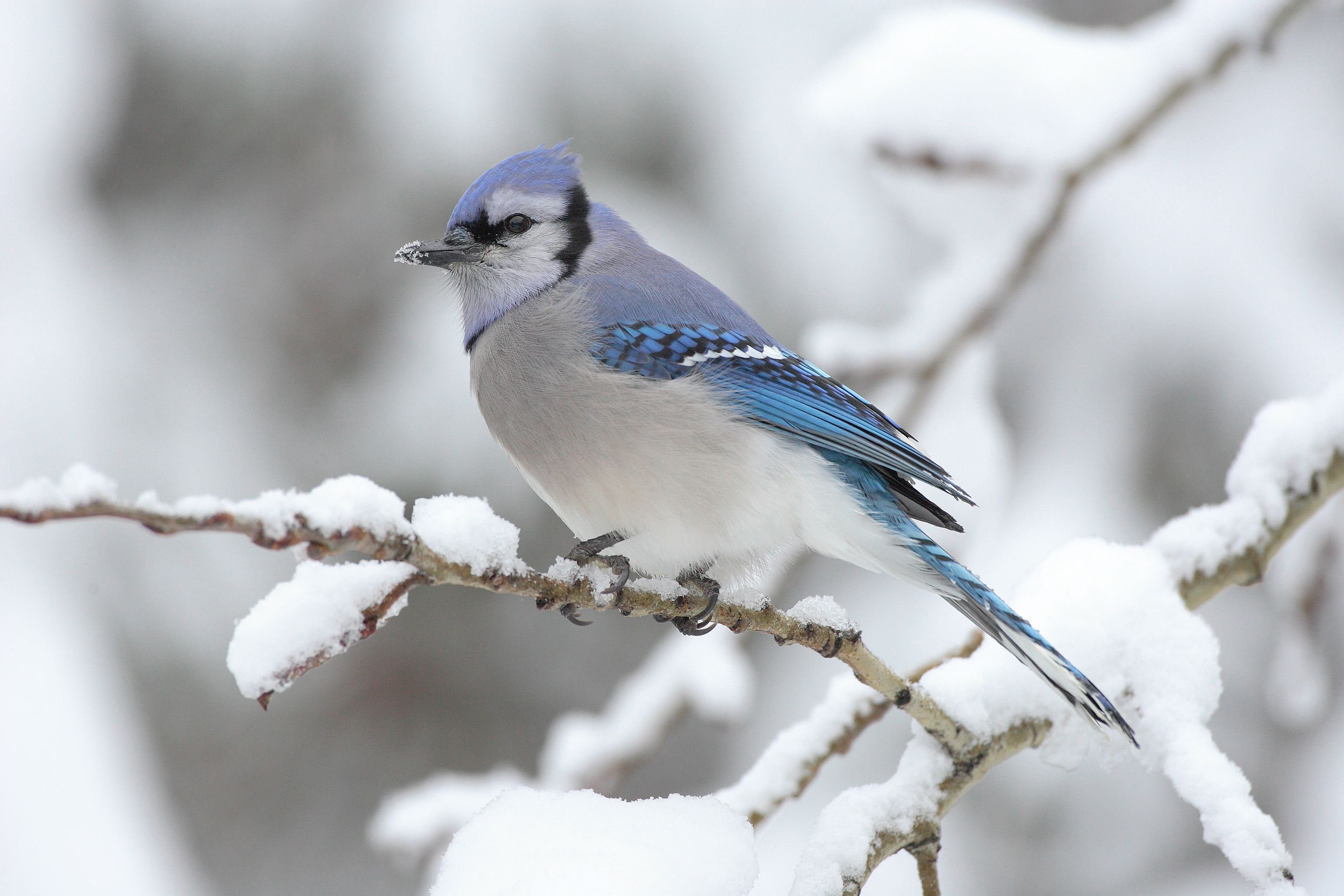
- A living Cyanocitta jay
  Cyanocitta
  - †Cyanocitta cristata
- Cyathoseris
  - †Cyathoseris formosa
  - †Cyathoseris valmondasiaca – tentative report
- †Cyclaster
  - †Cyclaster drewryensis – type locality for species
- Cyclicopora
  - †Cyclicopora colum
  - †Cyclicopora filifera
  - †Cyclicopora spongiopsis
- Cyclostremiscus
  - †Cyclostremiscus – type locality for species informal
  - †Cyclostremiscus dalli
  - †Cyclostremiscus exacuus
  - †Cyclostremiscus sylvaerupis
- Cygnus
- Cylichna
  - †Cylichna acrotoma
  - †Cylichna dekayi
  - †Cylichna meyeri
- †Cylindracanthus
  - †Cylindracanthus acus
  - †Cylindracanthus rectus
- Cyllene – or unidentified comparable form
  - †Cyllene bellana
- †Cymatholcus
  - †Cymatholcus schucherti – type locality for species
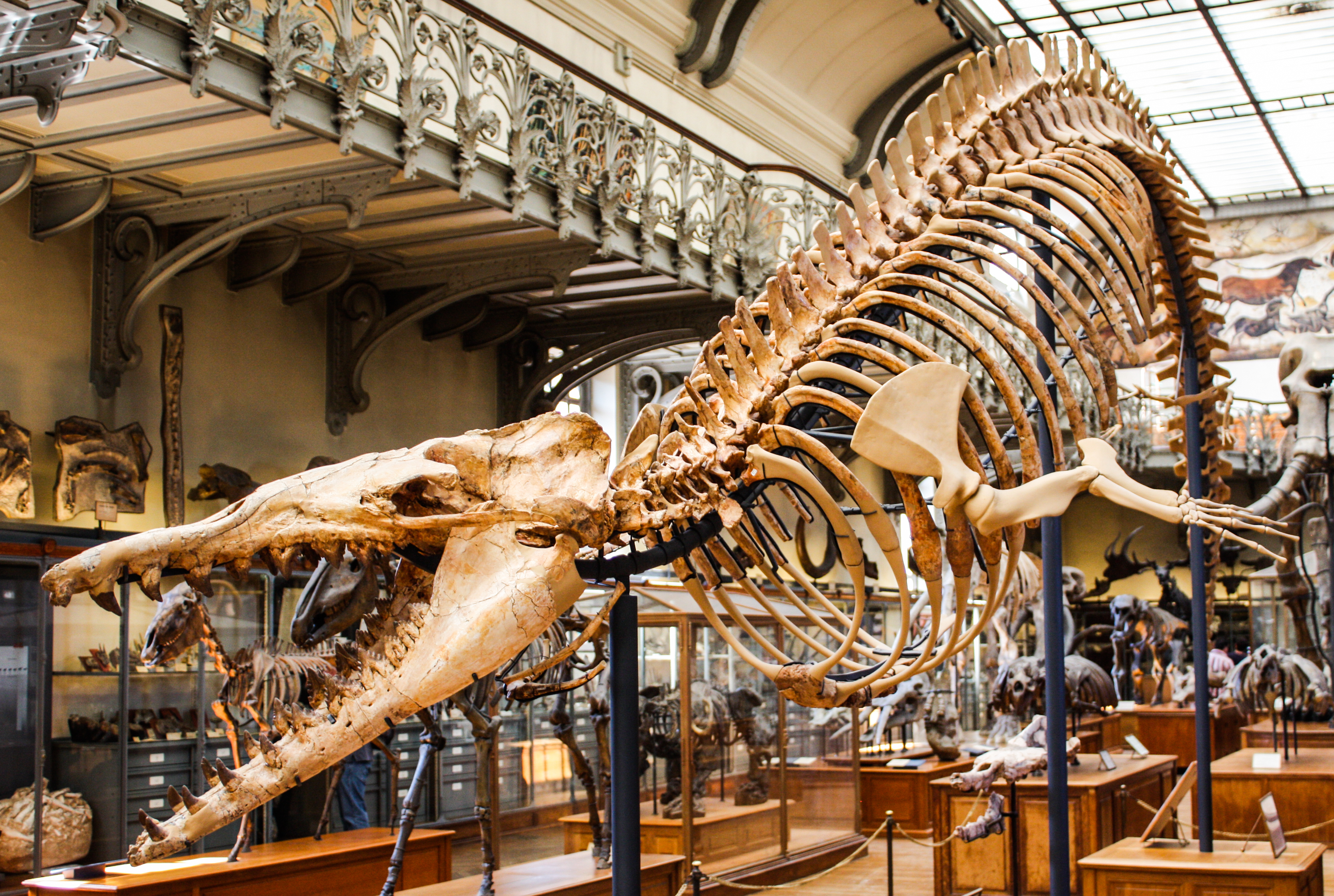
- Mounted fossilized skeleton of the Eocene whale Cynthiacetus
  †Cynthiacetus
  - †Cynthiacetus maxwelli
- Cypraea
- Cypraedia
  - †Cypraedia gilberti
- †Cypraeorbis
  - †Cypraeorbis alabamensis
  - †Cypraeorbis nuculoides
- †Cypropterina
  - †Cypropterina transovuloides
- †Cythereis – tentative report
  - †Cythereis collei
  - †Cythereis gosportensis – type locality for species
  - †Cythereis longicostata – type locality for species
- Cytherella
- Cytherelloidea
  - †Cytherelloidea cocoaensis
  - †Cytherelloidea montgomeryensis
- Cytheretta
  - †Cytheretta alexanderi
- †Cytherideis
  - †Cytherideis alta – type locality for species
  - †Cytherideis gosportensis – type locality for species
  - †Cytherideis perforata – type locality for species
- †Cytheriopsis
  - †Cytheriopsis hydana
- Cytheromorpha
  - †Cytheromorpha calva
- Cytheropteron
  - †Cytheropteron montgomeryensis
  - †Cytheropteron variosum
- Cytherura
  - †Cytherura semireticulata – type locality for species
  - †Cytherura ultra – type locality for species

== D ==
- Daphnella
  - †Daphnella gregorioi
- Dasyatis
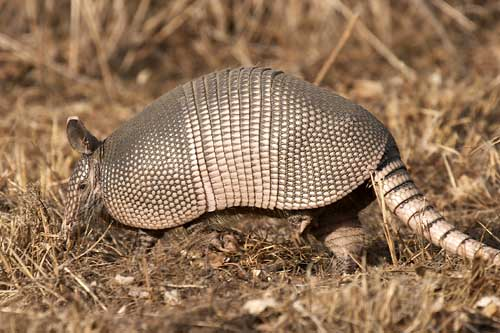
- A living Dasypus, or long-nosed armadillo
  Dasypus
  - †Dasypus bellus
- Dendrophyllia
  - †Dendrophyllia dendrophylloides
  - †Dendrophyllia lisbonensis – type locality for species
- Dentalina
- Dentalium
  - †Dentalium annulatum
  - †Dentalium blandum
  - †Dentalium eugenii
  - †Dentalium jacksonense
  - †Dentalium mediaviense
  - †Dentalium microstria
  - †Dentalium minutis
  - †Dentalium minutistriatum
  - †Dentalium multannulatum
  - †Dentalium nediaviense
  - †Dentalium sylvaerupis
  - †Dentalium thalloides
- †Dentiterebra
  - †Dentiterebra prima
- Desmeplagioecia
  - †Desmeplagioecia compressa
- Desmognathus
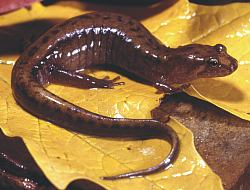
  - A living Desmognathus ochrophaeus, or Allegheny Mountain dusky salamander
    †Desmognathus ochrophaeus
- †Dhondtichlamys
  - †Dhondtichlamys greggi
- Diadophis
  - †Diadophis punctatus
- Diaperoecia
  - †Diaperoecia clava
  - †Diaperoecia rugosa – type locality for species
  - †Diaperoecia walcotti – type locality for species
- †Diastopora
  - †Diastopora magnipora
- Dichocoenia
  - †Dichocoenia alabamensis – type locality for species
- Didymosella
  - †Didymosella crassa
- †Dinematichthys
  - †Dinematichthys midwayensis – type locality for species
- †Dinohyus
  - †Dinohyus hollandi – or unidentified related form
- Diodon – tentative report
- Diodora
  - †Diodora alabama
  - †Diodora mauryi
  - †Diodora mediavia
  - †Diodora tenebrosa
  - †Diodora unilineata
- Diplodonta
  - †Diplodonta corbiscula
  - †Diplodonta hopkinsensis
  - †Diplodonta inflata
  - †Diplodonta nana
  - †Diplodonta ungulina
- †Diplopholeos
  - †Diplopholeos lineatum
- †Dirocerithium
  - †Dirocerithium vinctum
  - †Dirocerithium whitfieldi
- †Discocyclina
  - †Discocyclina weaveri
- Discorbis
  - †Discorbis hemisphaerica
- †Discotrochus
  - †Discotrochus orbigianus
  - †Discotrochus orbignianus
- Distorsio
  - †Distorsio septemdenta
- †Ditremaster
  - †Ditremaster beckeri
- †Dolicholatirus – tentative report
  - †Dolicholatirus interstriatus
  - †Dolicholatirus tombigbeensis
- †Doliocassis
  - †Doliocassis nupera
- Donax
  - †Donax acutangula
- Dorsanum
  - †Dorsanum bellaliratum
- Dosinia – tentative report
- †Dosiniopsis
  - †Dosiniopsis lenticularis
- Dumetella
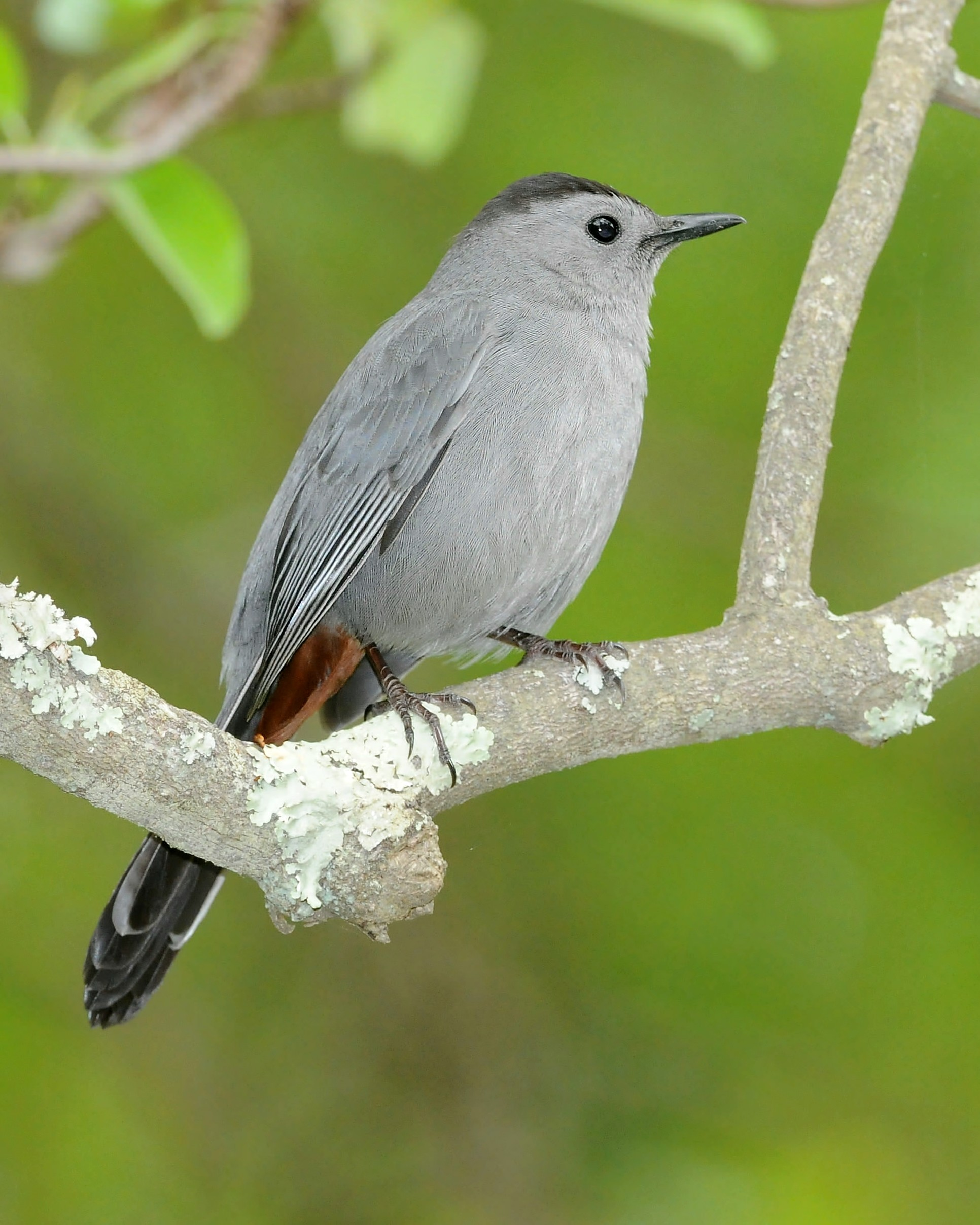
  - A living Dumetella carolinensis, or gray catbird
    †Dumetella carolinensis

== E ==
- †Eburneopecten
  - †Eburneopecten corneoides
  - †Eburneopecten hamiltonensis
  - †Eburneopecten scintillatus
- †Echanthus
  - †Echanthus georgiensis
- Echinocyamus
  - †Echinocyamus macneili
  - †Echinocyamus nacneili
- Echinocythereis
  - †Echinocythereis jacksonensis
- Echinolampas
  - †Echinolampas aldrichi
- †Echinolampus
  - †Echinolampus aldrichi
- †Echinopsis – tentative report
- †Ectopistes
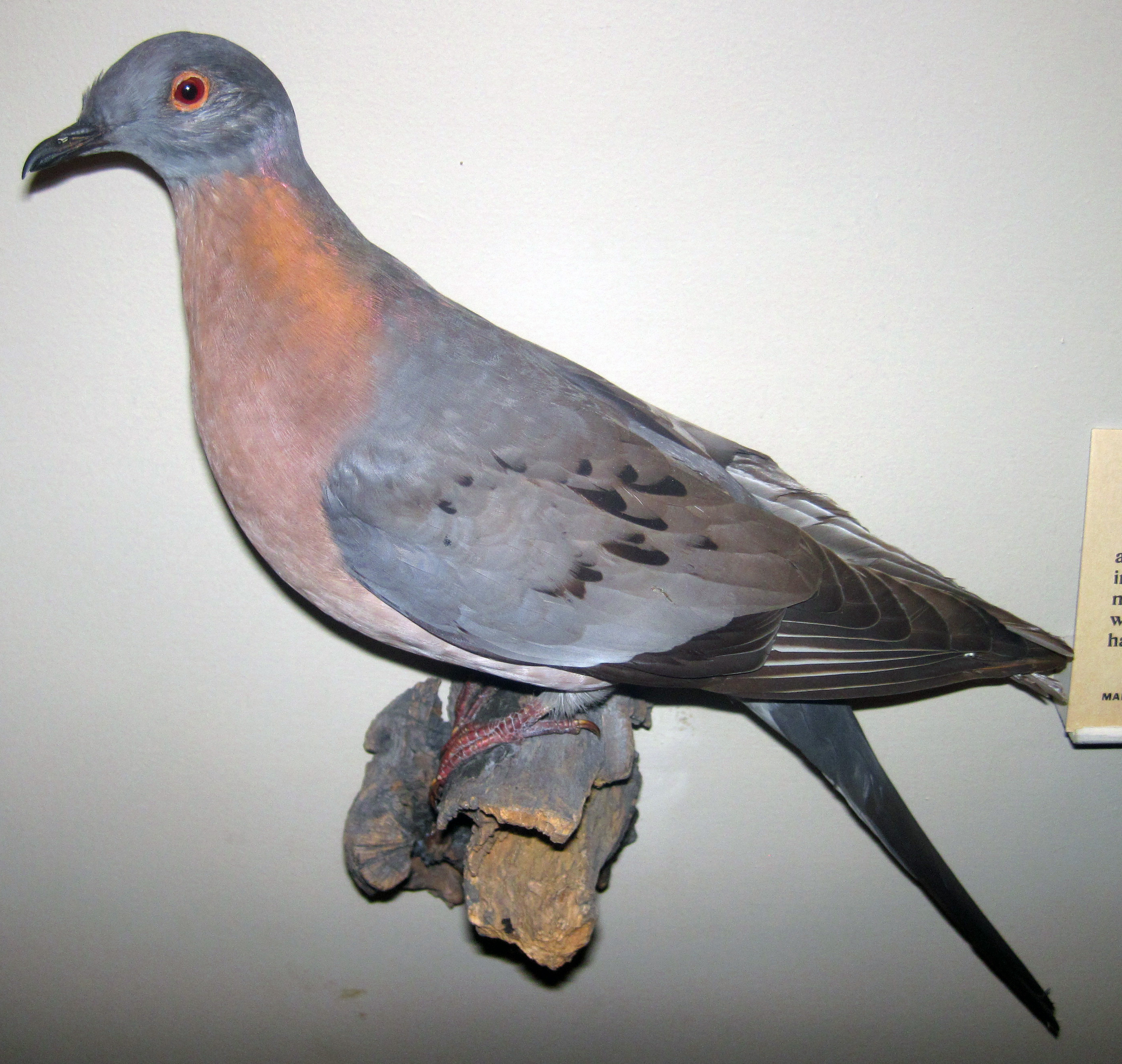
  - Taxidermied male Ectopistes migratorius, or passenger pigeon
    †Ectopistes migratorius
- †Egerella
  - †Egerella elimatula
  - †Egerella limatula
  - †Egerella subtrigonia
- †Egertonia
  - †Egertonia isodonta
- Elaphe
  - †Elaphe guttata – or unidentified comparable form
  - †Elaphe vulpina
- †Elimia
  - †Elimia sylvaerupsis
  - †Elimia trigemmata
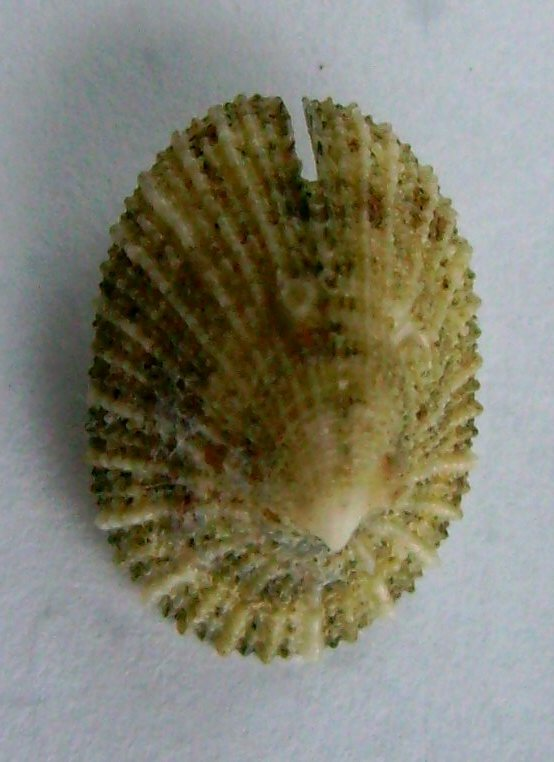
- Shell of an Emarginula keyhole limpet
  Emarginula
  - †Emarginula arata
- Endopachys – type locality for genus
  - †Endopachys claibornensis – type locality for species
  - †Endopachys lonsdale
  - †Endopachys lonsdalei – type locality for species
  - †Endopachys maclurii
- †Enoploclytia
  - †Enoploclytia tumimanus
- Enoplostomella
  - †Enoplostomella crassimuralis
  - †Enoplostomella defixa
  - †Enoplostomella lingulifera – type locality for species
  - †Enoplostomella rhomboidalis
  - †Enoplostomella vallata
- †Entalophora
- Entosolenia
  - †Entosolenia laevigata
- †Eoclathurella
  - †Eoclathurella meridionalis
- †Eocypraea
  - †Eocypraea eosmithi
  - †Eocypraea estellensis
- †Eodrilla
  - †Eodrilla depygis
  - †Eodrilla lonsdalei
  - †Eodrilla texana
  - †Eodrilla texanopsis
- †Eodrillia
  - †Eodrillia depygis
  - †Eodrillia lonsdalii
- †Eophysema
  - †Eophysema ozarkana
  - †Eophysema subvexa
- †Eopleurotoma
  - †Eopleurotoma bimoniata
  - †Eopleurotoma cainei
  - †Eopleurotoma cochlea
  - †Eopleurotoma desnoyersii
  - †Eopleurotoma gemmavia
  - †Eopleurotoma hoeninghausii
  - †Eopleurotoma lisboncola
  - †Eopleurotoma nodocarinata
  - †Eopleurotoma nupera
  - †Eopleurotoma rugatina
  - †Eopleurotoma rugosa
  - †Eopleurotoma sayi
  - †Eopleurotoma thyroidifera
  - †Eopleurotoma veatchi
- †Eosinica
  - †Eosinica elevata
- †Eosurcula
  - †Eosurcula beaumontii
  - †Eosurcula lesueurii
  - †Eosurcula moorei
  - †Eosurcula pulcherrima
  - †Eosurcula sanctimauritii
  - †Eosurcula superpons
  - †Eosurcula tardereperta
  - †Eosurcula tuomeyi
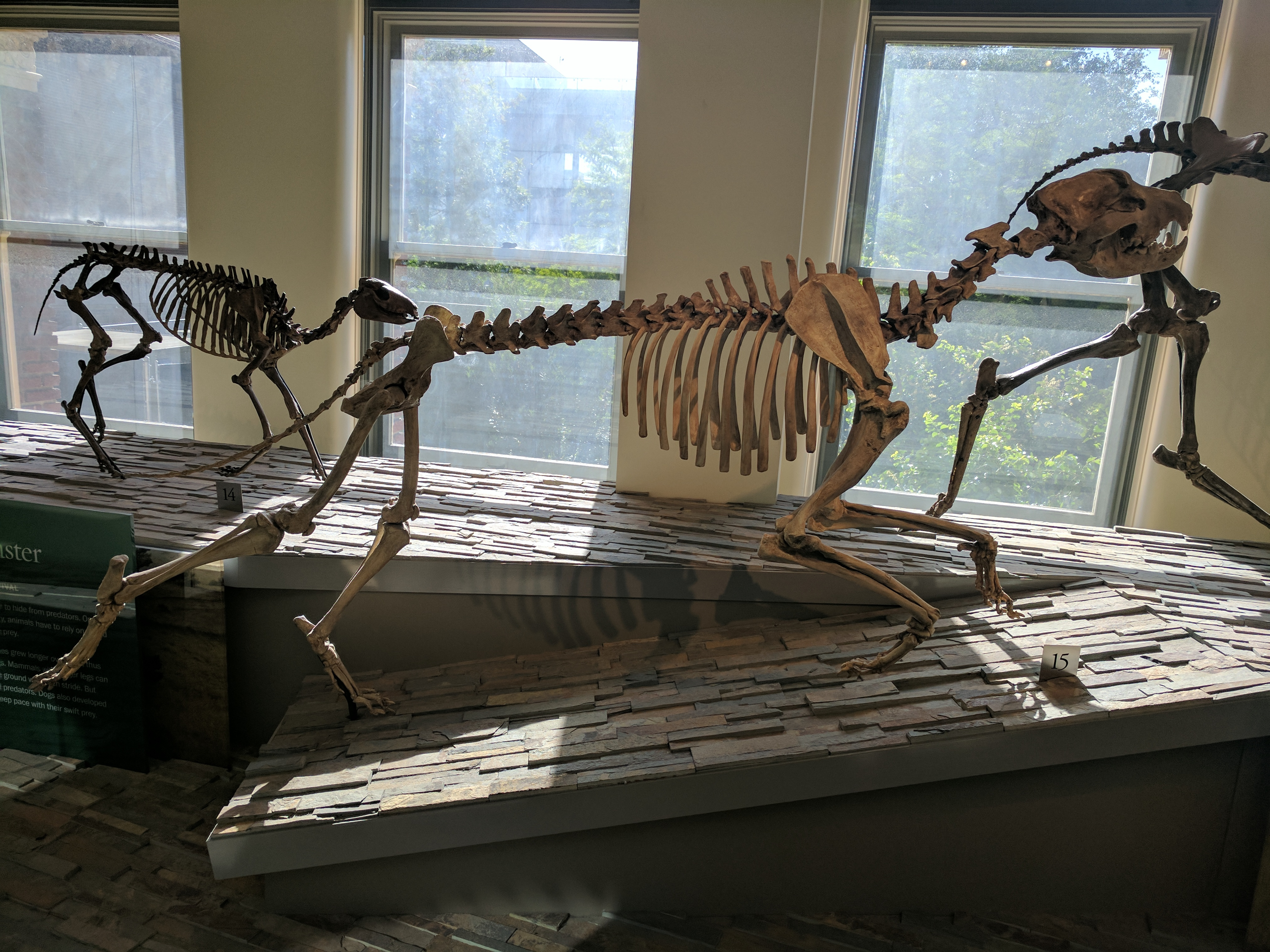
- Mounted fossilized skeleton of the Miocene bone-crushing dog Epicyon
  †Epicyon
  - †Epicyon haydeni – or unidentified comparable form
- Epilucina
  - †Epilucina rotunda
- Epitonium
  - †Epitonium exquisitum
  - †Epitonium mcglameriae
  - †Epitonium multiliniferum
  - †Epitonium munistriatum
  - †Epitonium subacutum
  - †Epitonium vetustum
- Eptesicus
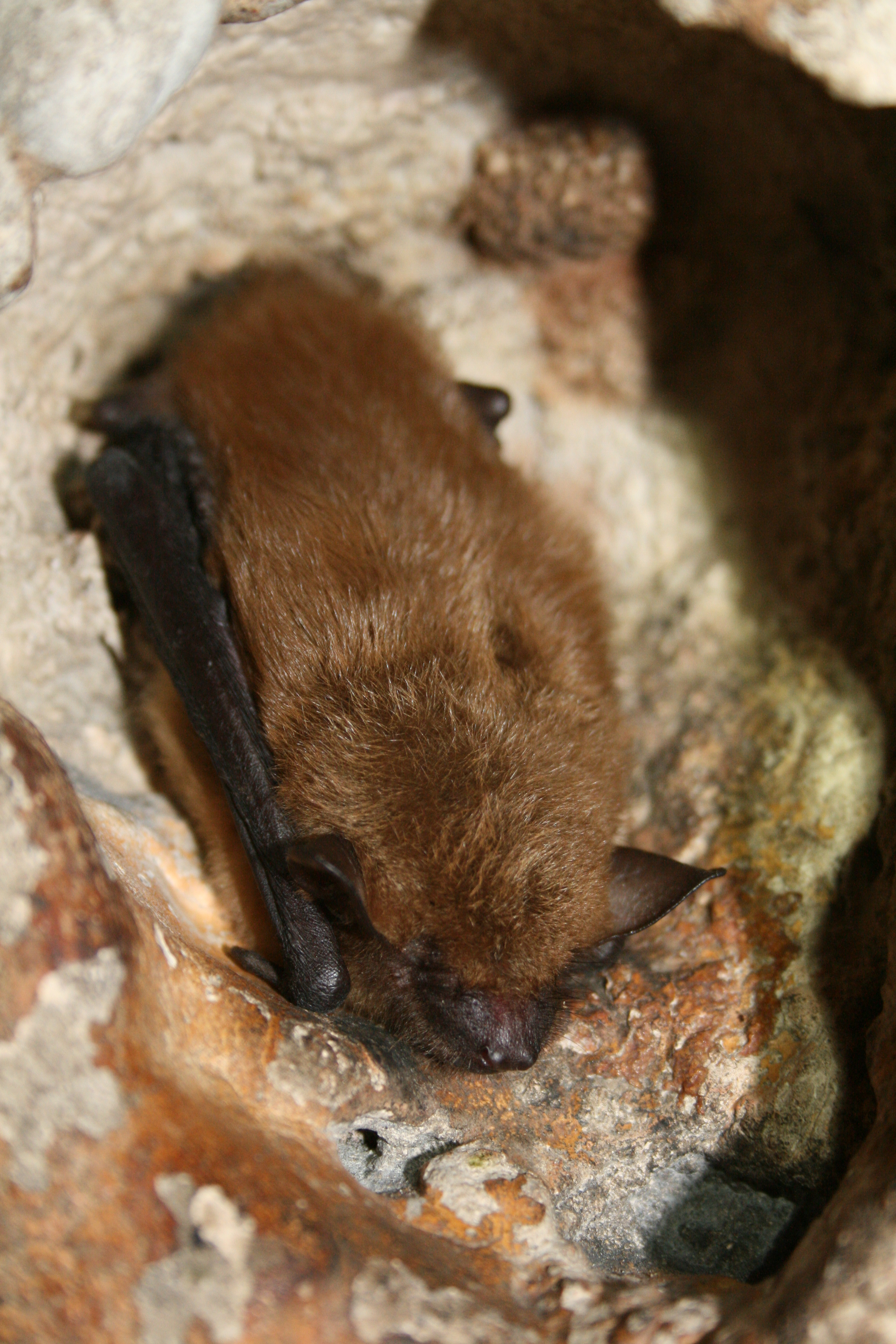
  - A living Eptesicus fuscus, or big brown bat
    †Eptesicus fuscus
- Equus
- Ervilia
  - †Ervilia lignitica
  - †Ervilia meyeri
- Erycina
  - †Erycina plicatula
  - †Erycina whitfieldi
- †Etyus
  - †Etyus buccata
  - †Etyus magniporosa
  - †Etyus strangulata
- †Eucheilodon
  - †Eucheilodon reticulata
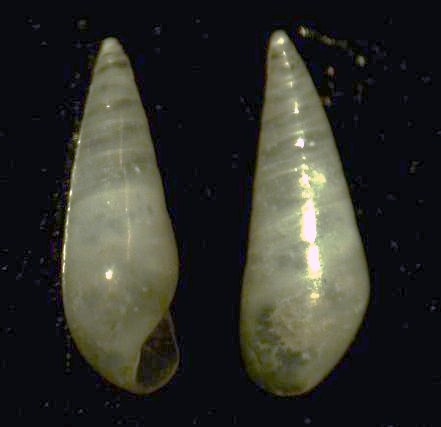
- Shells in differing orientations of the parasitic sea snail Eulima
  Eulima
  - †Eulima cainei
  - †Eulima extremis
- Eulimella – report made of unidentified related form or using admittedly obsolete nomenclature
  - †Eulimella propenotata
- Eupatagus
  - †Eupatagus antillarum
- Eupleura
  - †Eupleura morula
- †Eurhodia
  - †Eurhodia patelliformis
- †Euritina
  - †Euritina tecta
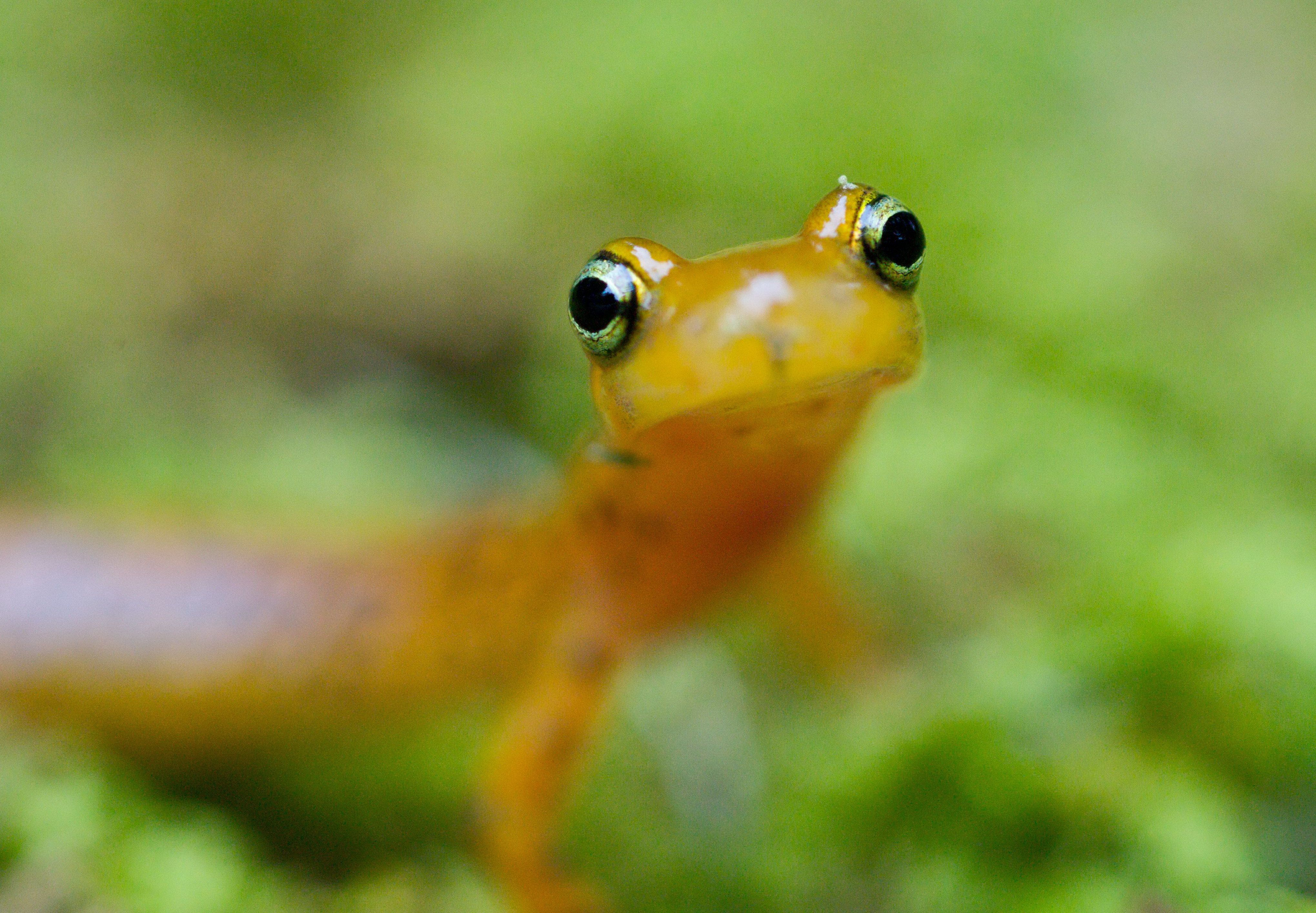
- Close-up of the head of a living Eurycea, or brook salamander
  †Eurycea
- Eurytellina
  - †Eurytellina linifera
  - †Eurytellina mooreana – tentative report
  - †Eurytellina papyria
  - †Eurytellina vaughani
- †Euscalpellum
  - †Euscalpellum eocenense
- Euspira
  - †Euspira aldrichi
  - †Euspira leana
  - †Euspira marylandica
  - †Euspira newtonensis
  - †Euspira perspecta
  - †Euspira sabina
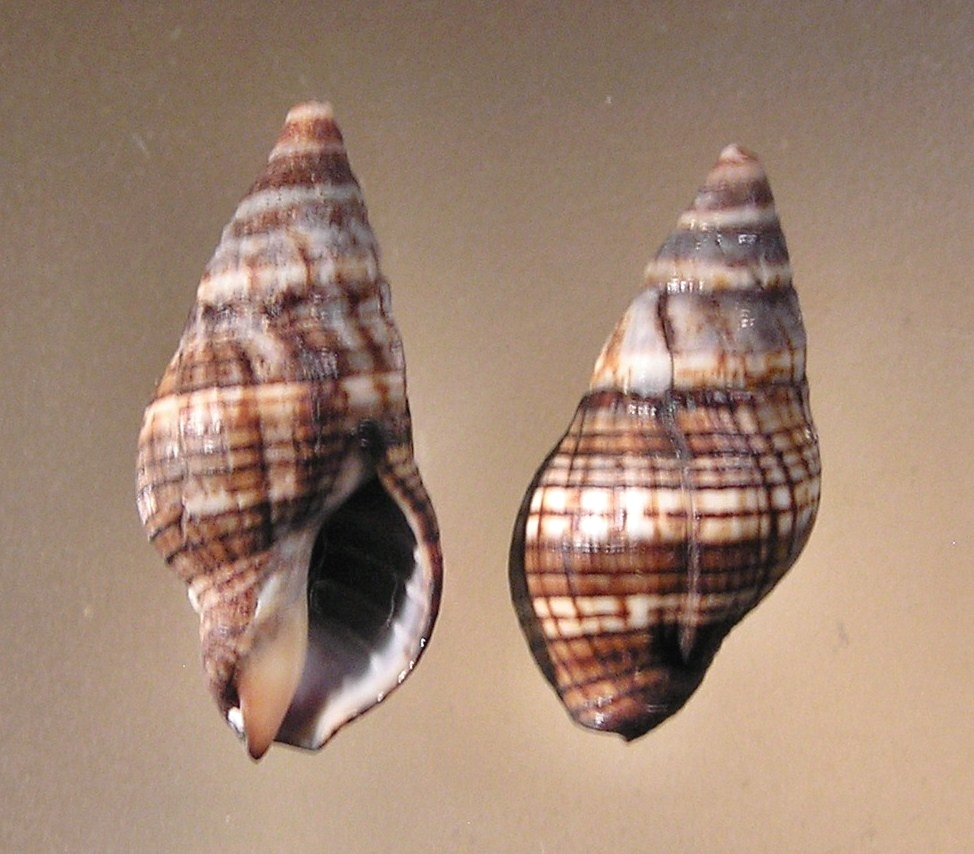
- Shells in differing orientations of Euthria whelks
  Euthria
  - †Euthria dubia
- †Eutrephoceras
  - †Eutrephoceras johnsoni
  - †Eutrephoceras jonesi – type locality for species
- Evalea
  - †Evalea bartschi
  - †Evalea melanella
- †Exilia
  - †Exilia pergracilis
- †Exilifusus
  - †Exilifusus thalloides
- †Exochoecia
  - †Exochoecia rugosa – type locality for species
- †Exogyra
  - †Exogyra costata

== F ==
- Falco
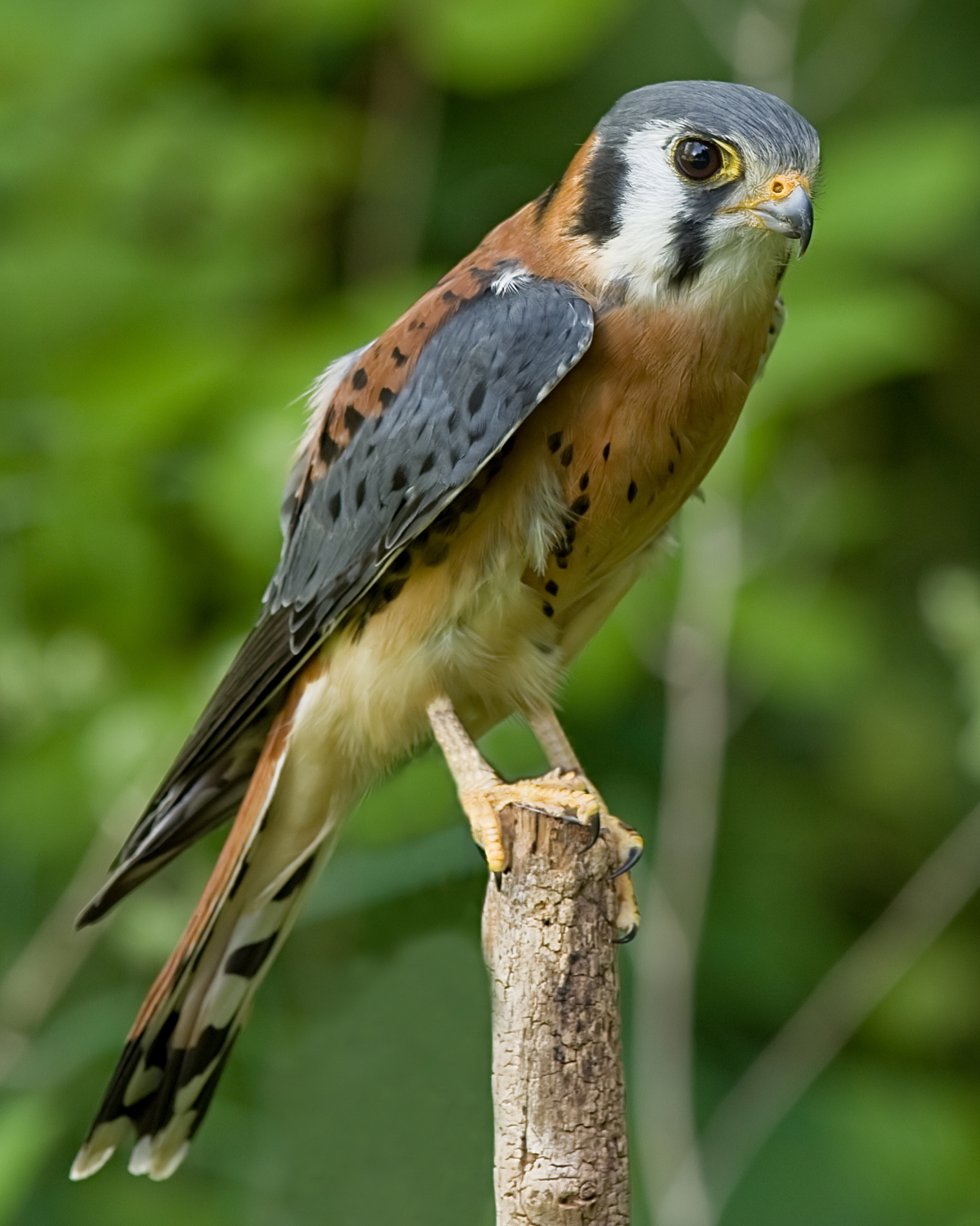
  - A living Falco sparverius, or American kestrel
    †Falco sparverius
- Falsifusus
  - †Falsifusus harrisi
  - †Falsifusus ludlovicianus
  - †Falsifusus ottonis
  - †Falsifusus subfilosus
- Fibularia
  - †Fibularia alabamensis
- †Ficopsis
  - †Ficopsis penita
  - †Ficopsis texana
- Filisparsa
  - †Filisparsa bini – type locality for species
  - †Filisparsa biseriata
  - †Filisparsa gracilis – type locality for species
  - †Filisparsa ingens
  - †Filisparsa laxata – type locality for species
  - †Filisparsa typica
- Fimbria
  - †Fimbria lirata
  - †Fimbria undata
  - †Fimbria urdata
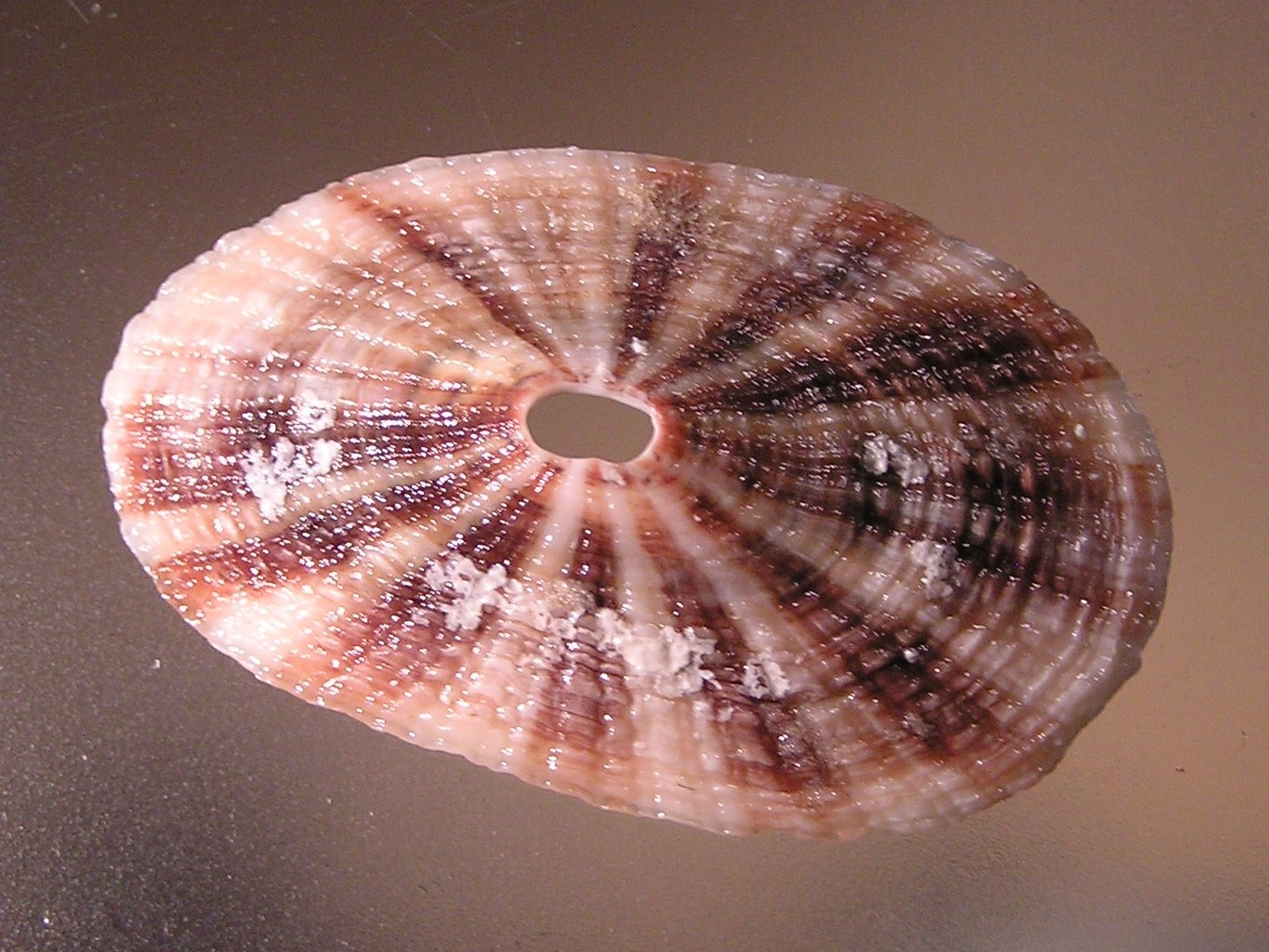
- Shell of a Fissurella keyhole limpet
  Fissurella
- Flabellum
  - †Flabellum conoideum – type locality for species
  - †Flabellum cuneiforme
  - †Flabellum johnsoni – type locality for species
  - †Flabellum magnocostatum
  - †Flabellum matthewsense
  - †Flabellum pachyphyllum
  - †Flabellum wailesii
  - †Flabellum wallesii
- Floridina
  - †Floridina antiqua
- Floridinella
  - †Floridinella vicksburgica
- Fulgurofusus
  - †Fulgurofusus quercollis
  - †Fulgurofusus rugatus
- Fusimitra
  - †Fusimitra millingtoni
  - †Fusimitra perexilis
  - †Fusimitra polita
- †Fusitoma
  - †Fusitoma sipha
- Fustiaria
  - †Fustiaria danai

== G ==
- †Gagaria
  - †Gagaria chickasawhay – type locality for species
  - †Gagaria salis – tentative report
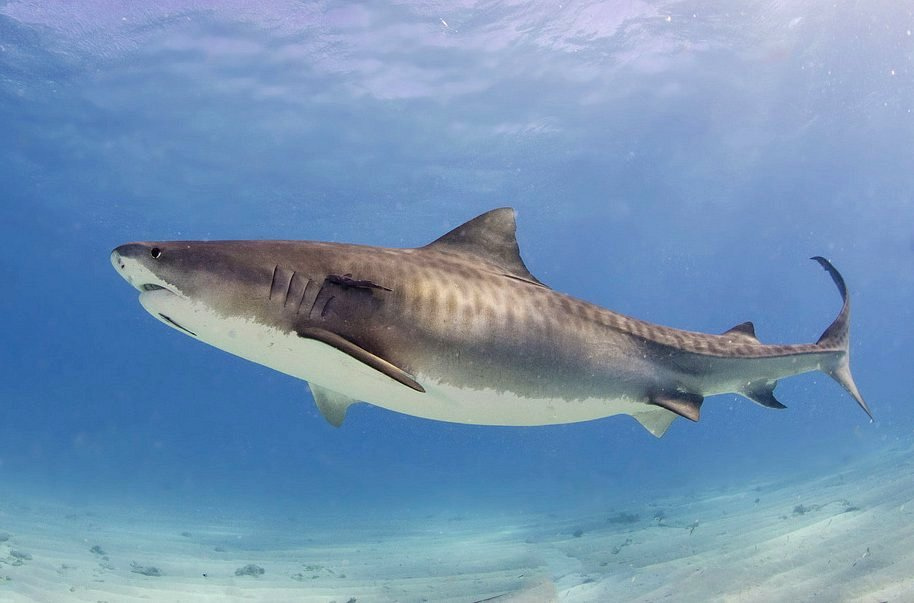
- A living Galeocerdo requiem shark
  Galeocerdo
  - †Galeocerdo alabamensis – type locality for species
  - †Galeocerdo clarkensis – type locality for species
  - †Galeocerdo latidens
- Galeodea
  - †Galeodea brevidentata
  - †Galeodea dubia
  - †Galeodea koureos
- Galeorhinus
  - †Galeorhinus falconeri – or unidentified comparable form
  - †Galeorhinus recticonus
- Gari
  - †Gari blainvillii
  - †Gari claibornense
  - †Gari ebora
  - †Gari eborea
  - †Gari filosum
  - †Gari harrisi
  - †Gari ozarkana
  - †Gari smithi
- †Gastopoda
- Gastrochaena
  - †Gastrochaena larva
  - †Gastrochaena striatula
- Gavia
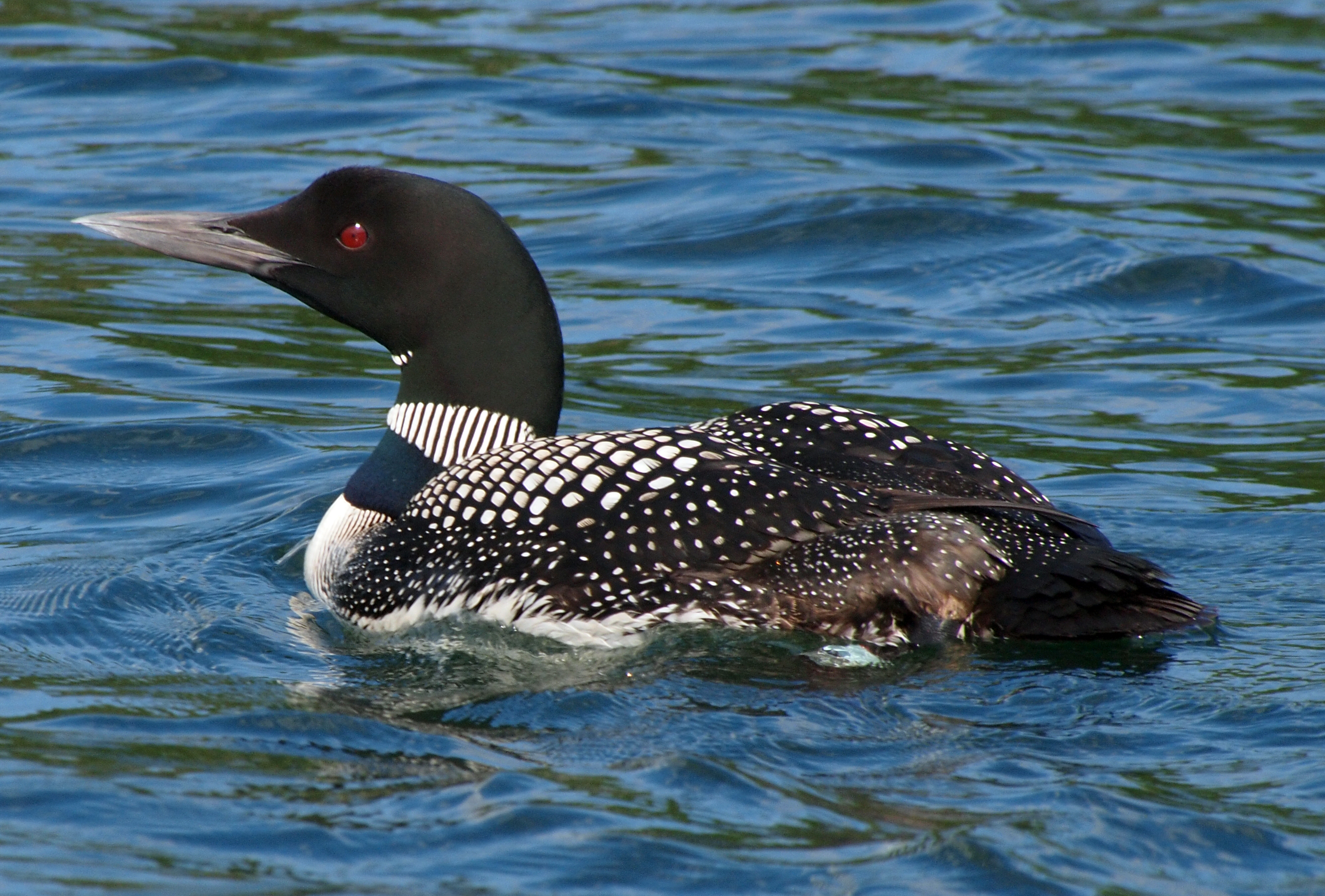
  - A living Gavia immer, or common loon
    †Gavia immer
- Gegania
  - †Gegania antiquata
- Gemma
  - †Gemma sanctimauricensis
- †Genartina
  - †Genartina texana
- Genota
  - †Genota gardnerae
  - †Genota gardneri
  - †Genota heilprini
- Geodia
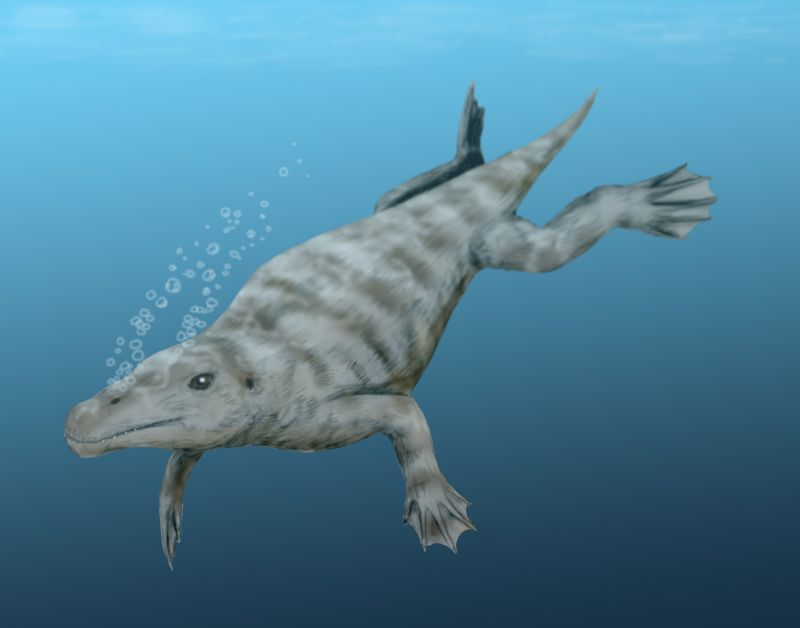
- Life restoration of the Eocene whale Georgiacetus
  †Georgiacetus
  - †Georgiacetus vogtlensis
- Gephyrotes
  - †Gephyrotes quadriserialis
- Gibbolucina
  - †Gibbolucina pandata
- †Gigantostrea
  - †Gigantostrea sylvaerupis
  - †Gigantostrea trigonalis
- †Gilbertia
  - †Gilbertia estellensis
- †Gilbertina
  - †Gilbertina estellensis
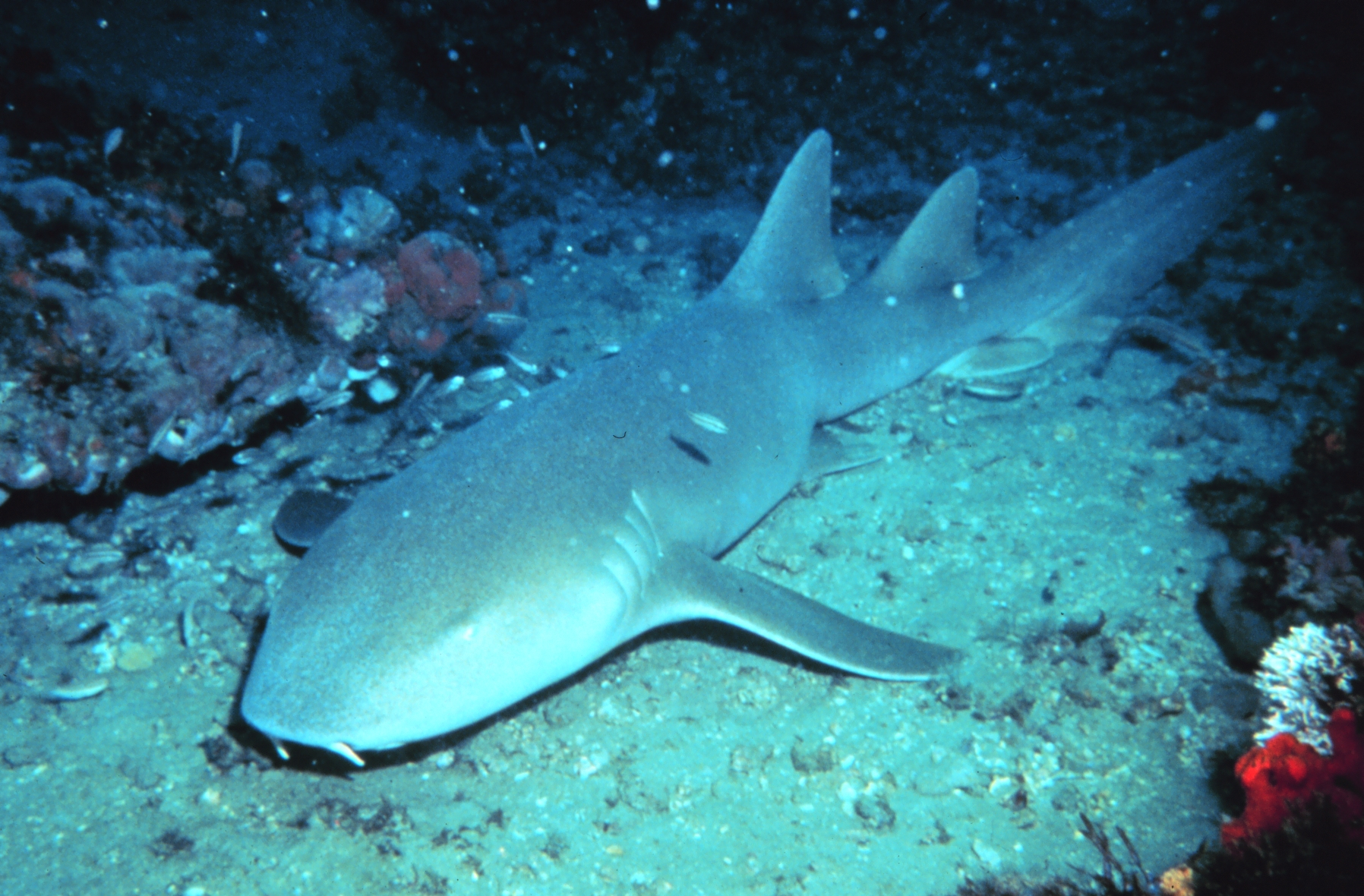
- A living Ginglymostoma nurse shark
  Ginglymostoma
  - †Ginglymostoma blankenhorni – or unidentified comparable form
  - †Ginglymostoma serra
- †Gitolampas
  - †Gitolampas georgiensis
- Glossus
  - †Glossus mediavia
- †Gluttulina – tentative report
  - †Gluttulina irregularis
- Glycymeris
  - †Glycymeris aviculoides
  - †Glycymeris filosa
  - †Glycymeris idonea
  - †Glycymeris lisbonensis
  - †Glycymeris minor
  - †Glycymeris staminea
  - †Glycymeris trigonella
- Glyptoactis
  - †Glyptoactis alticostata
  - †Glyptoactis nasuta
  - †Glyptoactis sillimani
  - †Glyptoactis trapaquara
- †Glyptostyla
  - †Glyptostyla bacula
- †Glyptotoma
  - †Glyptotoma conradiana
- Goniopora
  - †Goniopora aldrichi – type locality for species
- †Grammella
  - †Grammella pusilla – type locality for species
- †Graphularia
- Graptemys
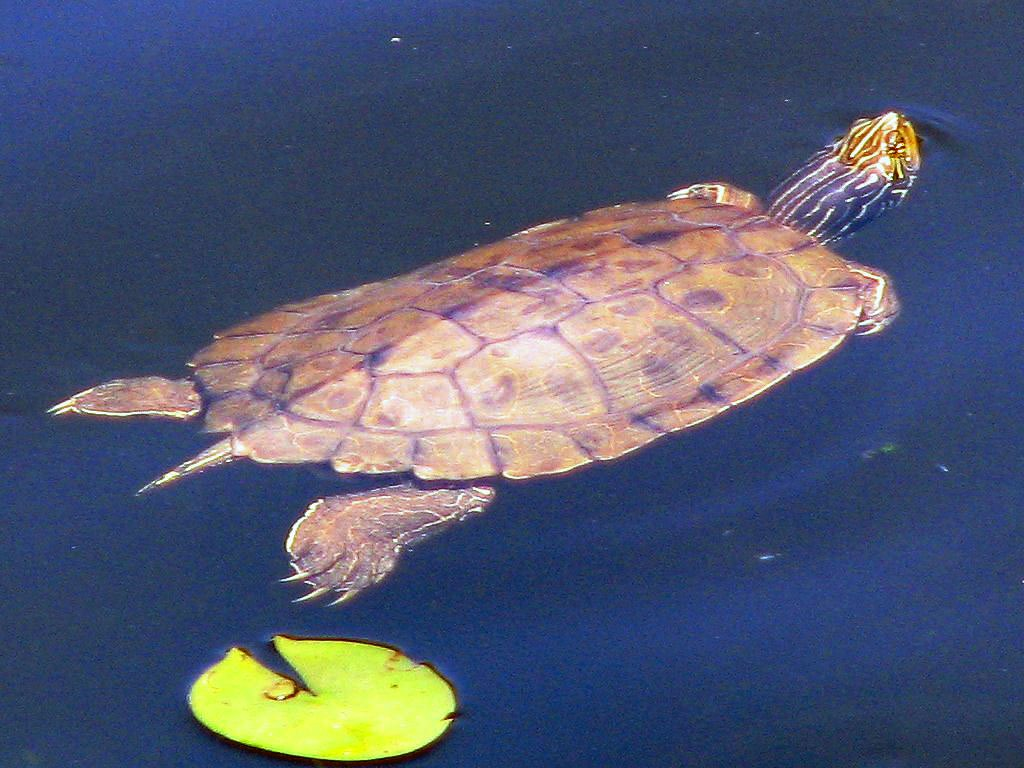
  - A living Graptemys geographica, or northern map turtle
    †Graptemys geographica
- †Grateloupia
  - †Grateloupia hydana
- Grus
- †Gryphaeostrea
  - †Gryphaeostrea plicatella
  - †Gryphaeostrea vomer
- Gyroidina
  - †Gyroidina soldanii

== H ==
- †Hadralucina – tentative report
  - †Hadralucina augustana
- †Haimesiastraea – type locality for genus
  - †Haimesiastraea conferta – type locality for species
- Haliaeetus
  - †Haliaeetus leucocephalus – or unidentified comparable form
- Haliris
  - †Haliris granuloides
- †Hamimesiastraea
  - †Hamimesiastraea coniferta
- †Hamulus
  - †Hamulus onyx
- Haplocytheridea
  - †Haplocytheridea goochi
  - †Haplocytheridea montgomeryensis
- Hastula
  - †Hastula houstonia
  - †Hastula venusta
- Haustator
  - †Haustator carinata
  - †Haustator perdita
  - †Haustator rina
- Hemiaster
  - †Hemiaster moscovensis – type locality for species
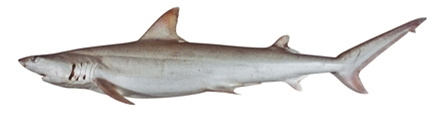
- A living Hemipristis weasel shark
  Hemipristis
  - †Hemipristis curvatus
  - †Hemipristis wyattdurhami – type locality for species
- †Hemisurcula
  - †Hemisurcula silicata
- Henryhowella
  - †Henryhowella florienensis
- †Hercoglossa
  - †Hercoglossa mcglameryae
  - †Hercoglossa orbiculata
  - †Hercoglossa ulrichi
  - †Hercoglossa walteri
- Hermanites – tentative report
  - †Hermanites dohmi
  - †Hermanites hysonensis
- †Herpetopora
  - †Herpetopora danica
- †Hesperiturris – tentative report
  - †Hesperiturris nodocarinatus
- Heterodon
  - †Heterodon platirhinos – or unidentified comparable form
- Heterodontus
  - †Heterodontus woodwardi – or unidentified comparable form
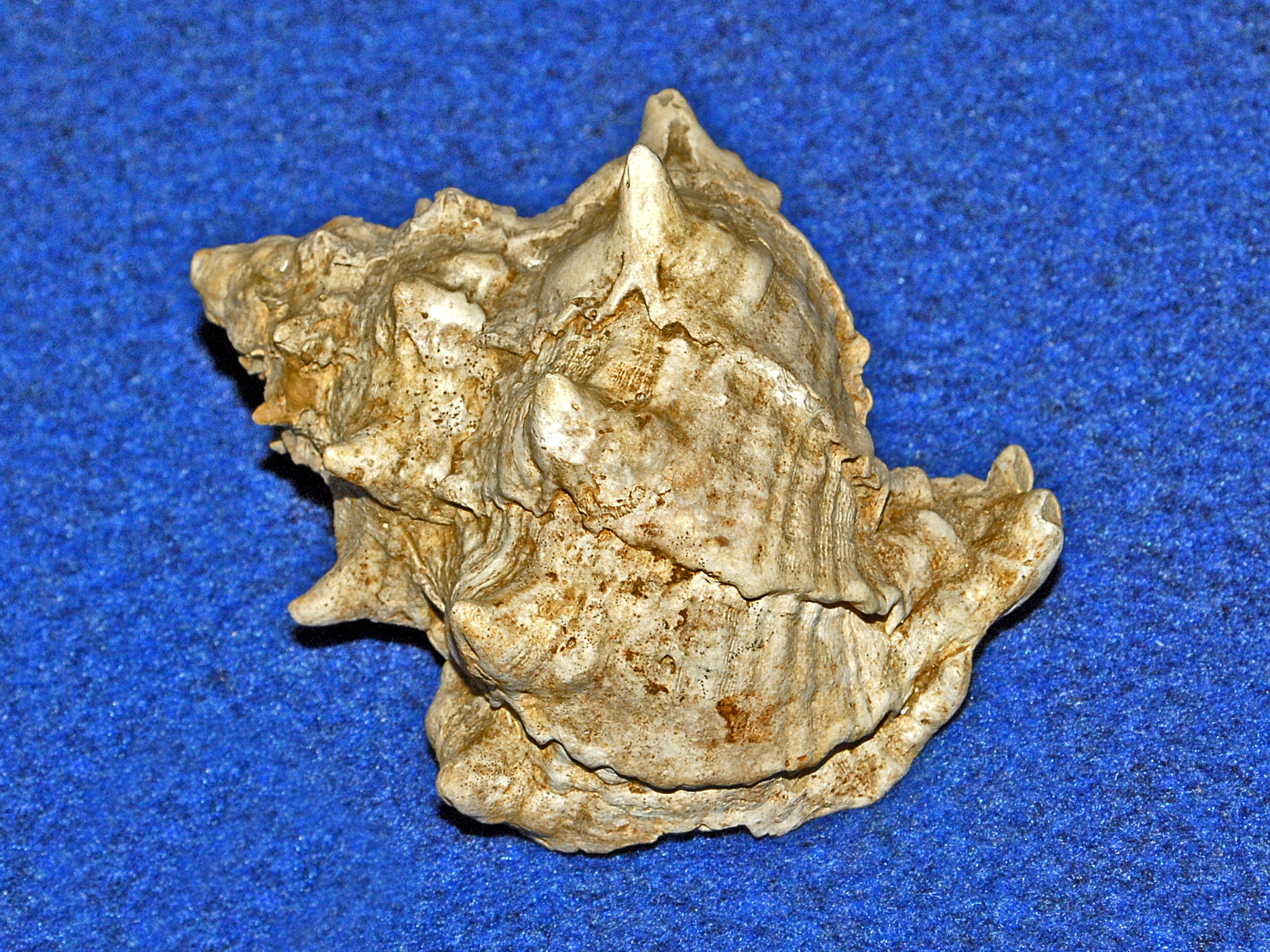
- Fossilized shell of the Paleocene-modern murex sea snail Hexaplex
  Hexaplex
  - †Hexaplex colei
  - †Hexaplex engonatus – type locality for species
  - †Hexaplex vanuxemi
- Hincksina
  - †Hincksina costulifera – type locality for species
  - †Hincksina elegans – type locality for species
  - †Hincksina jacksonica
- †Hindsiella
  - †Hindsiella faba
- Hippomenella
  - †Hippomenella capitimortis
  - †Hippomenella costulata
  - †Hippomenella crassicollis
  - †Hippomenella pungens – type locality for species
  - †Hippomenella transversa
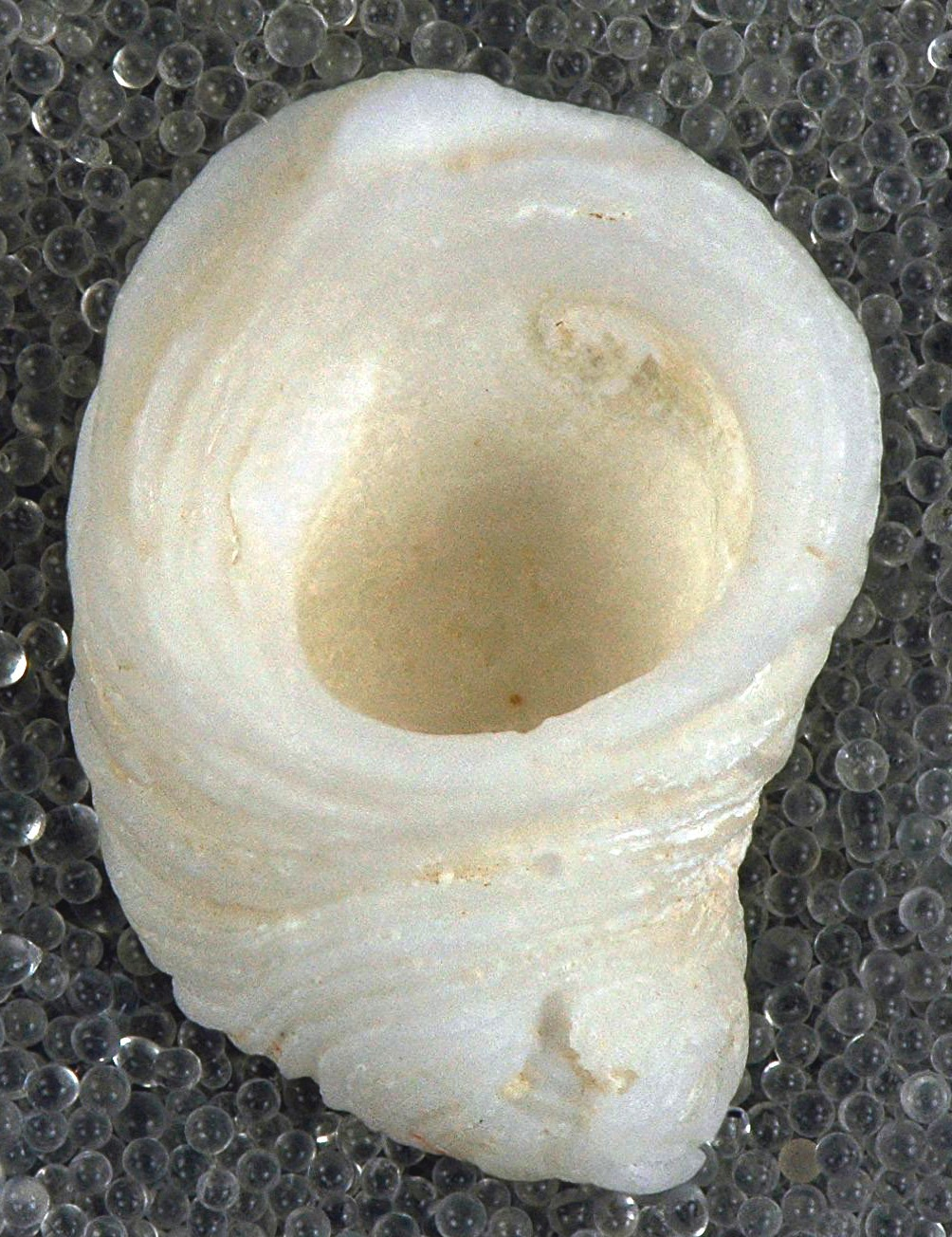
- Shell of a Hipponix, or hoof sea snail
  Hipponix
  - †Hipponix pygmaeus
  - †Hipponix sylvaerupis
  - †Hipponix vagus
- Hippopleurifera
  - †Hippopleurifera costulata
  - †Hippopleurifera crassicollis
  - †Hippopleurifera incondita
  - †Hippopleurifera moodysbranchensis
  - †Hippopleurifera rotula
- Hippoporella
  - †Hippoporella perforata – type locality for species
- Hippoporina
  - †Hippoporina lucens
  - †Hippoporina midwayaica
- Hyla
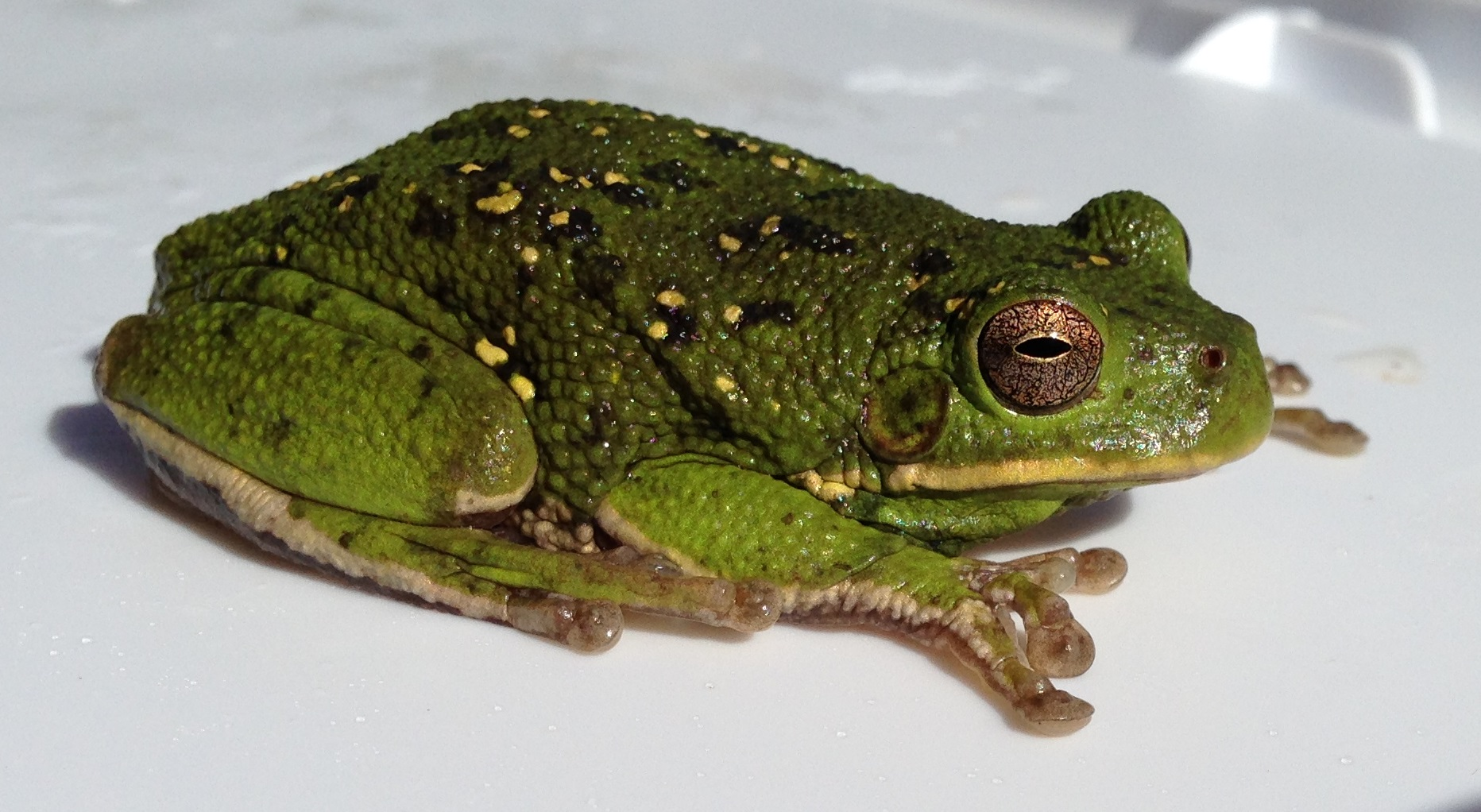
  - A living Hyla gratiosa, or barking tree frog
    †Hyla gratiosa
- †Hyposaurus
  - †Hyposaurus rogersii
- †Hypotodus
  - †Hypotodus robustus

== I ==
- Idmonea
  - †Idmonea grallator
  - †Idmonea milneana
  - †Idmonea petri
  - †Idmonea triforata
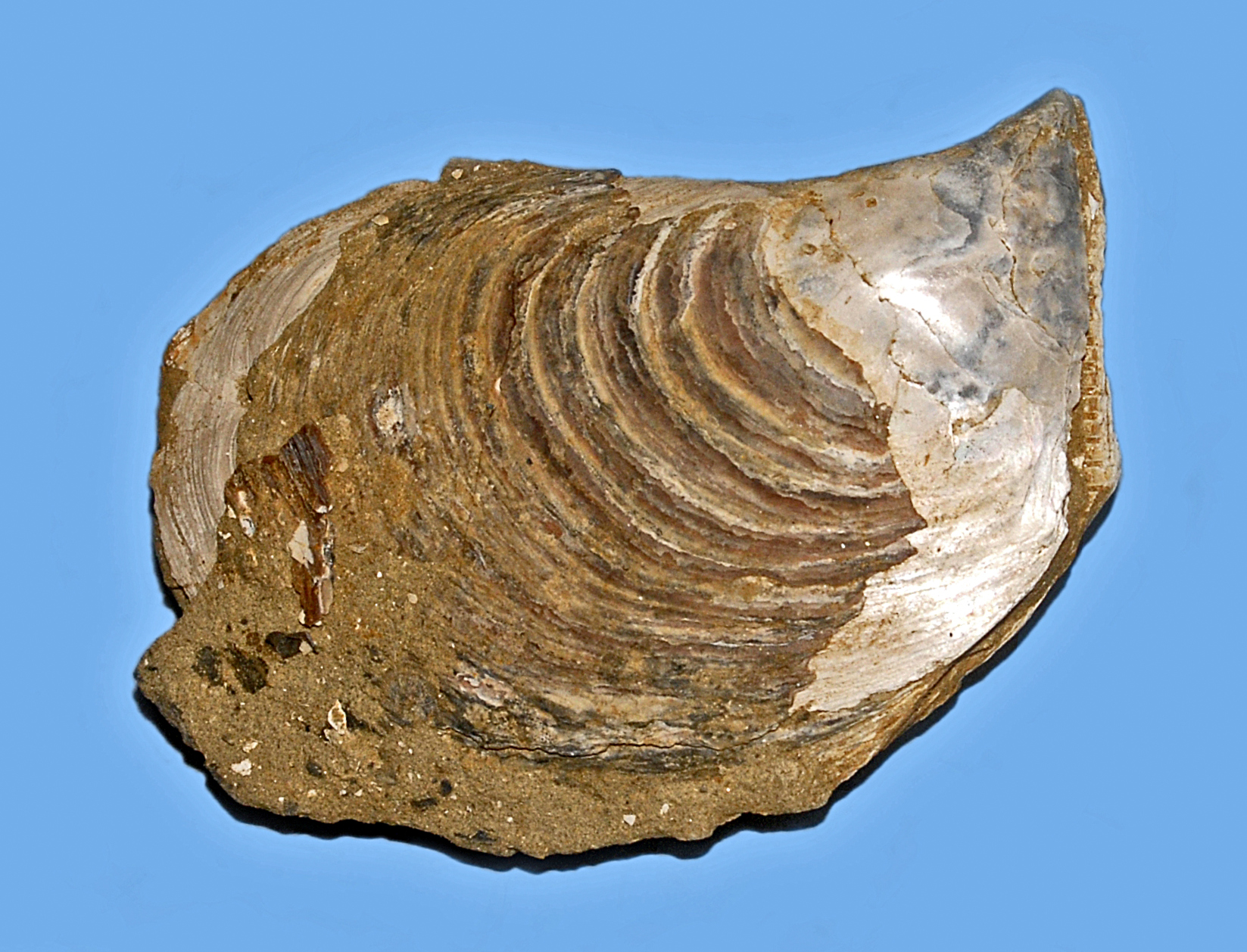
- Fossilized shell of the Permian-modern marine bivalve Isognomon
  Isognomon
  - †Isognomon cornelliana

== J ==
- †Jaekelotodus
  - †Jaekelotodus trigonalis
- †Jefitchia
  - †Jefitchia copelandi
- Jupiteria
  - †Jupiteria jonesi
  - †Jupiteria smirna

== K ==
- †Kapalmerella
  - †Kapalmerella arenicola
  - †Kapalmerella dumblei
  - †Kapalmerella mortoni
  - †Kapalmerella pleboides
- Katherinella
  - †Katherinella trigoniata
  - †Katherinella trinitatis
- †Keilostoma
  - †Keilostoma mediavia
- †Kleidionella
  - †Kleidionella grandis
- †Konarocythere
  - †Konarocythere spurgeonae
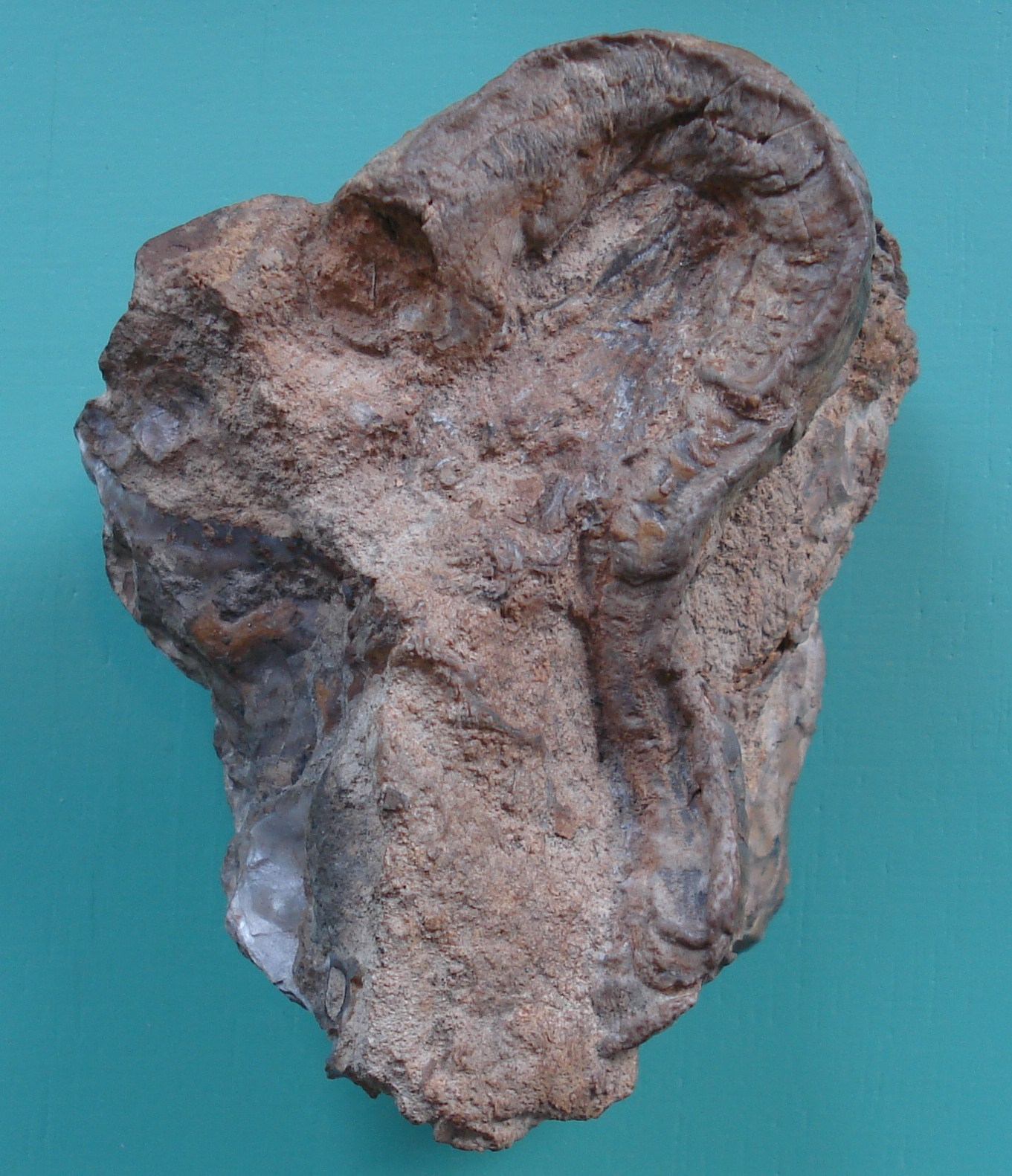
- Fossilized "worm" tube, possibly of the Oligocene-modern shipworm marine bivalve genus Kuphus
  Kuphus
  - †Kuphus incrassatus

== L ==
- Lacazella
  - †Lacazella nana – type locality for species
- Lacerna
  - †Lacerna hexagonalis
- †Lacinia
  - †Lacinia alveata
  - †Lacinia claibornensis
- †Lacunaria
  - †Lacunaria alabamiensis
  - †Lacunaria erecta
- †Laevibuccinum
  - †Laevibuccinum constrictum
  - †Laevibuccinum harrisi
  - †Laevibuccinum lineatum
  - †Laevibuccinum popleum
  - †Laevibuccinum prorsum
- Laevicardium
- Laganum
  - †Laganum floridanum
- †Lagonoecia
  - †Lagonoecia lamellifera – type locality for species
- Lamarckina
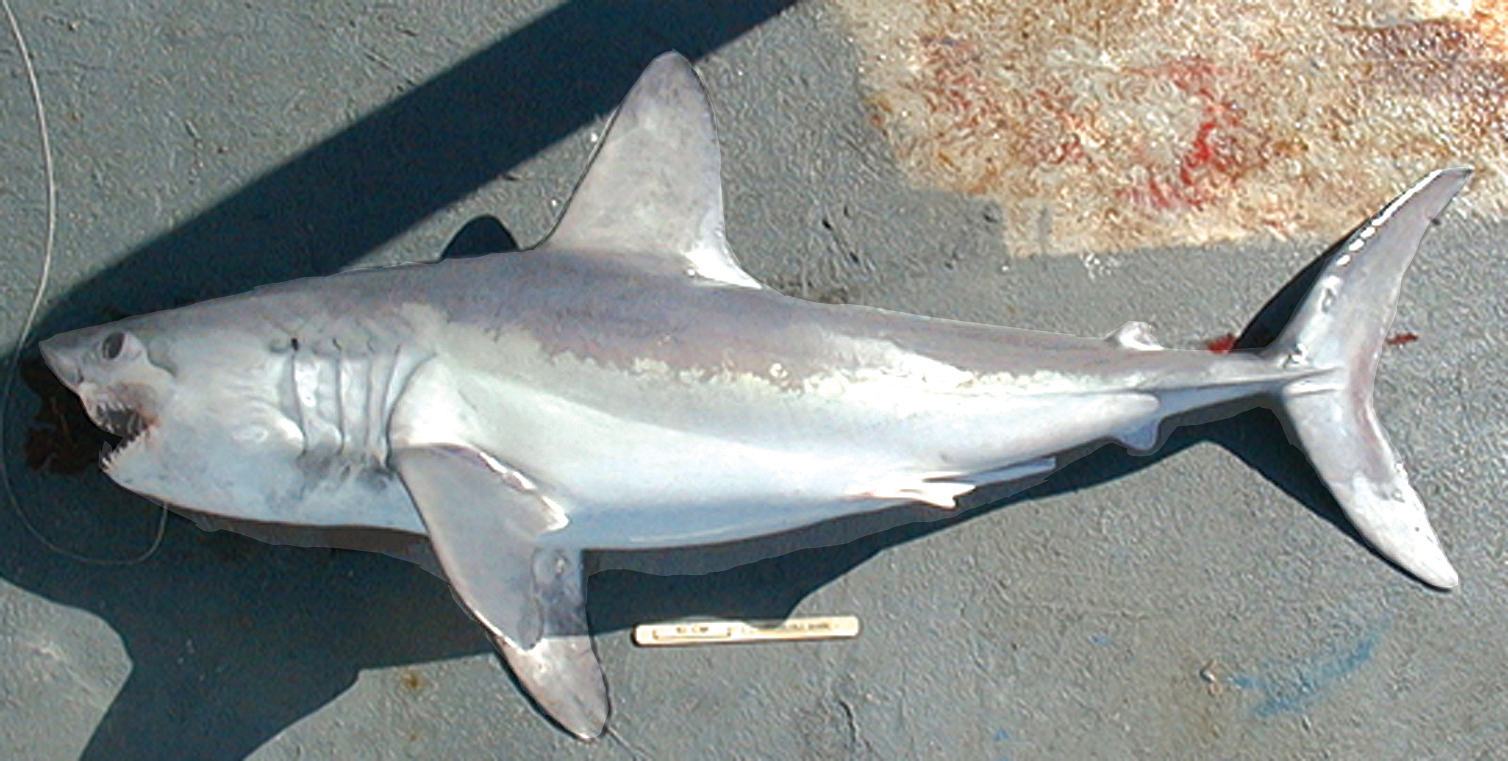
- A modern Lamna mackerel shark
  Lamna
  - †Lamna lerichei
  - †Lamna mediavia – type locality for species
- Lampropeltis
  - †Lampropeltis getulus
  - †Lampropeltis triangulum
- †Lapparia
  - †Lapparia mooreana
  - †Lapparia pactilis
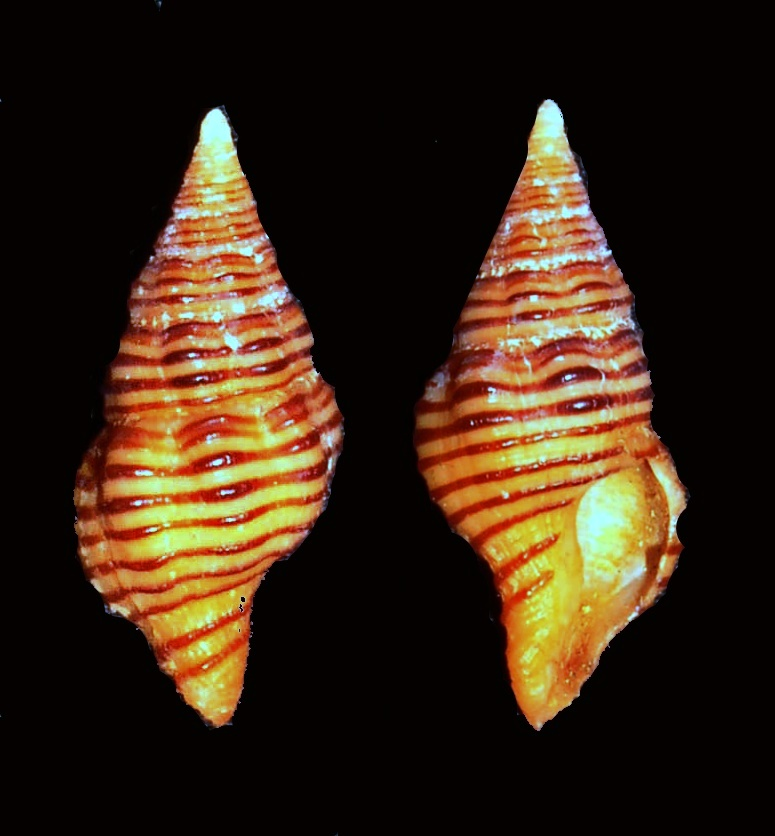
- Two views of a shell of a Latirus sea snail
  Latirus
  - †Latirus biplicatus
  - †Latirus elaboratus
  - †Latirus extricatus
  - †Latirus interstriatus
  - †Latirus moorei
  - †Latirus plicatus
  - †Latirus tepus
- †Ledina
  - †Ledina smirna
- †Leiorhinus
  - †Leiorhinus prorutus
- Leiosella
  - †Leiosella grandisora – type locality for species
  - †Leiosella rostrifera
- Lenticulina
- †Lepidocyclina
  - †Lepidocyclina mantelli
  - †Lepidocyclina undosa – or unidentified comparable form
- Lepton
  - †Lepton vaughani
- †Levifusus
  - †Levifusus alveata
  - †Levifusus bellanus
  - †Levifusus bispinosus
  - †Levifusus dalei
  - †Levifusus dallianus
  - †Levifusus irrasus
  - †Levifusus mortonii
  - †Levifusus mortoniopsis
  - †Levifusus pagodiformis
  - †Levifusus prepagoda
  - †Levifusus regularoides
  - †Levifusus supraplanus
  - †Levifusus suteri
  - †Levifusus trabeatus
- Lichenopora
  - †Lichenopora goldfussi
  - †Lichenopora grignonensis
  - †Lichenopora prolifera
- Limacina
  - †Limacina choctavensis
  - †Limacina elongatoidea
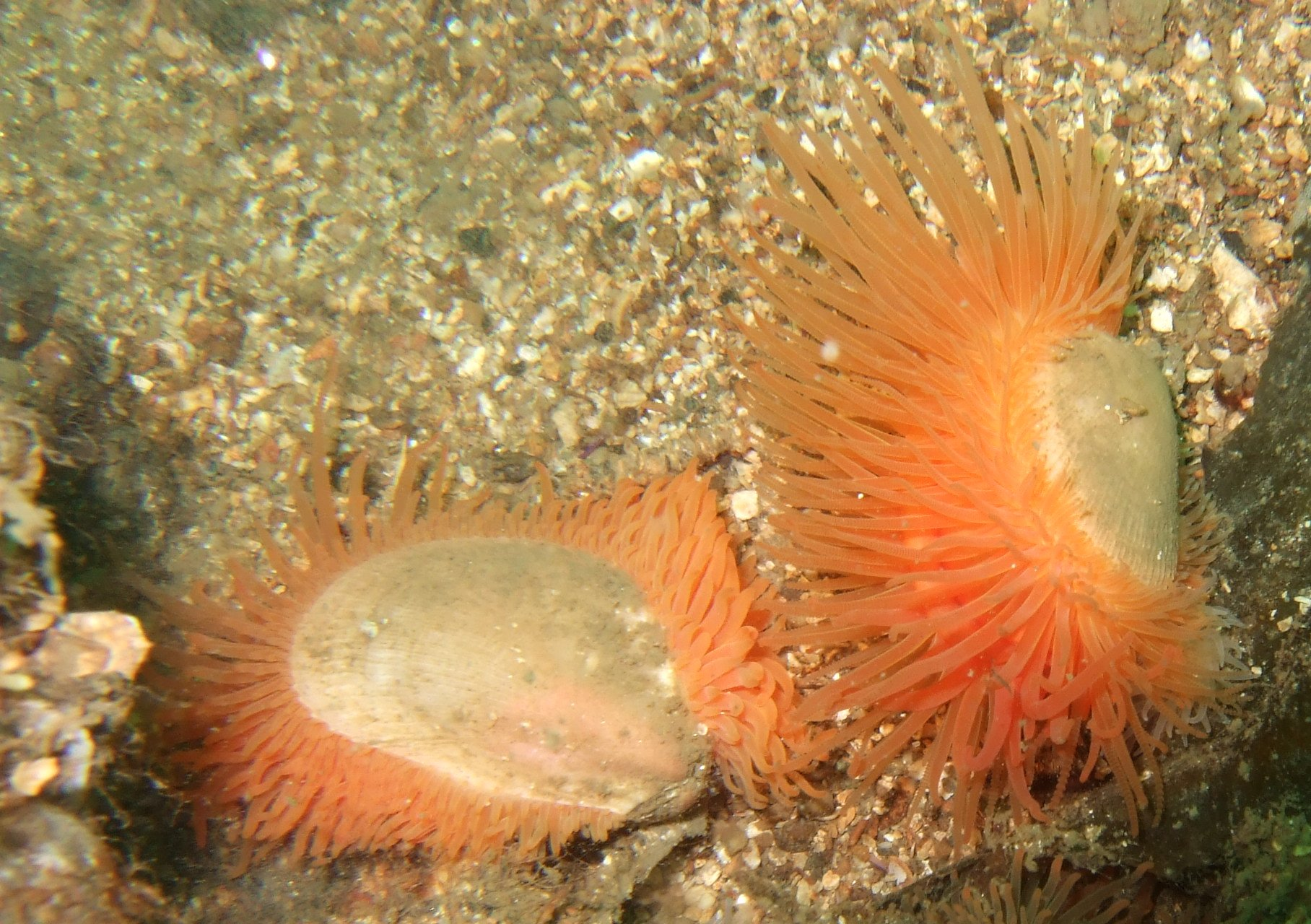
- Living Limaria, or file shells
  Limaria
  - †Limaria ozarkana
- Limopsis
  - †Limopsis aviculoides
- Linga
  - †Linga alveata
  - †Linga carinifera
  - †Linga pomilia
  - †Linga smithi
- †Linthia
  - †Linthia alabamensis – type locality for species
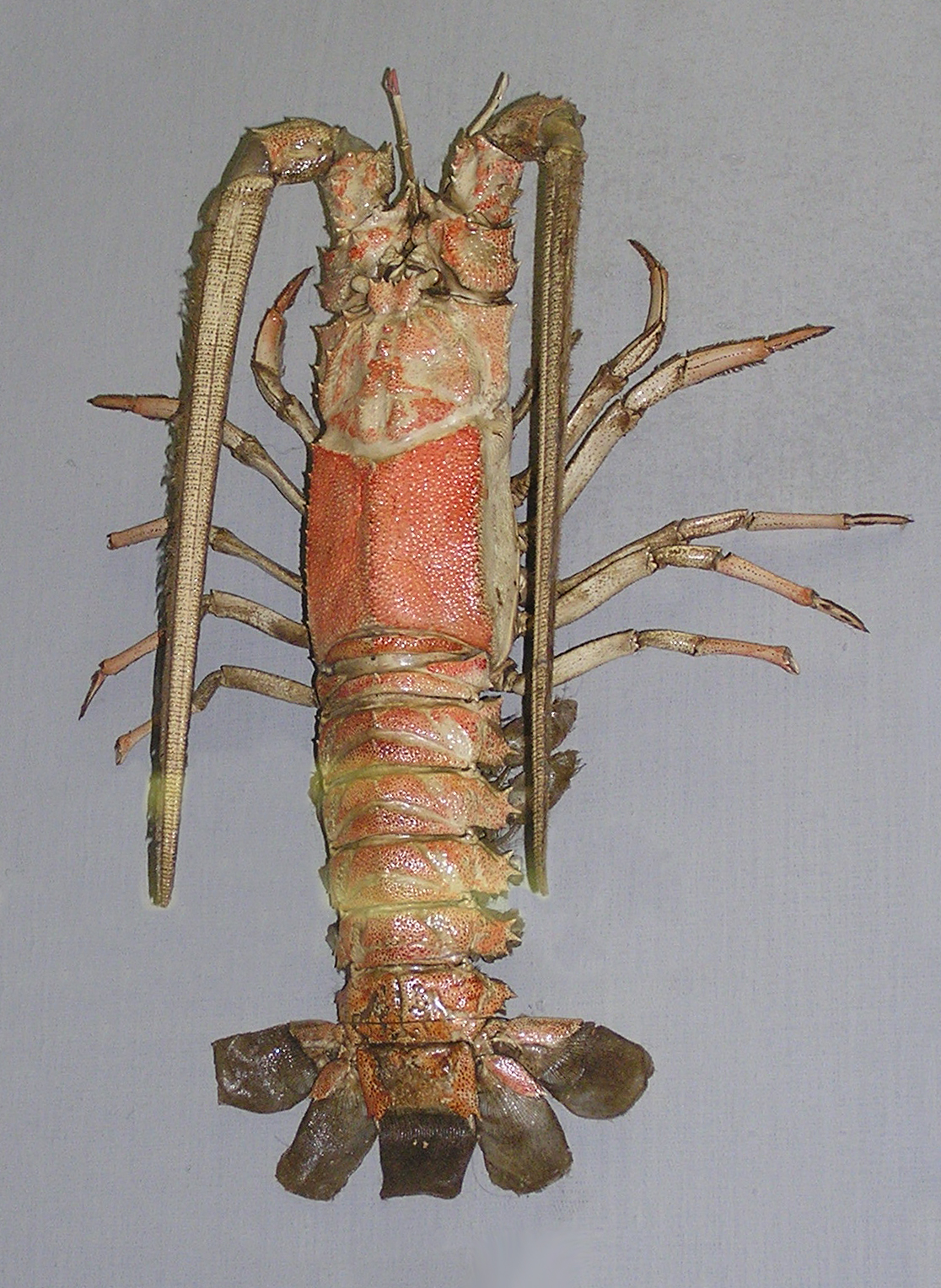
- A modern Linuparus spiny lobster
  †Linuparus
  - †Linuparus wilcoxensis
- †Lirodiscus
  - †Lirodiscus jacksonensis
  - †Lirodiscus mediavia
  - †Lirodiscus protractus
  - †Lirodiscus scutellarius
  - †Lirodiscus smithvillensis
  - †Lirodiscus tellinoides
- †Lirofusus
  - †Lirofusus subtenuis
  - †Lirofusus thoracicus
- †Lisbonia
  - †Lisbonia expansa
- Lithophaga
  - †Lithophaga claibornensis
  - †Lithophaga gainesensis
  - †Lithophaga nigra – or unidentified related form
  - †Lithophaga petricoloides
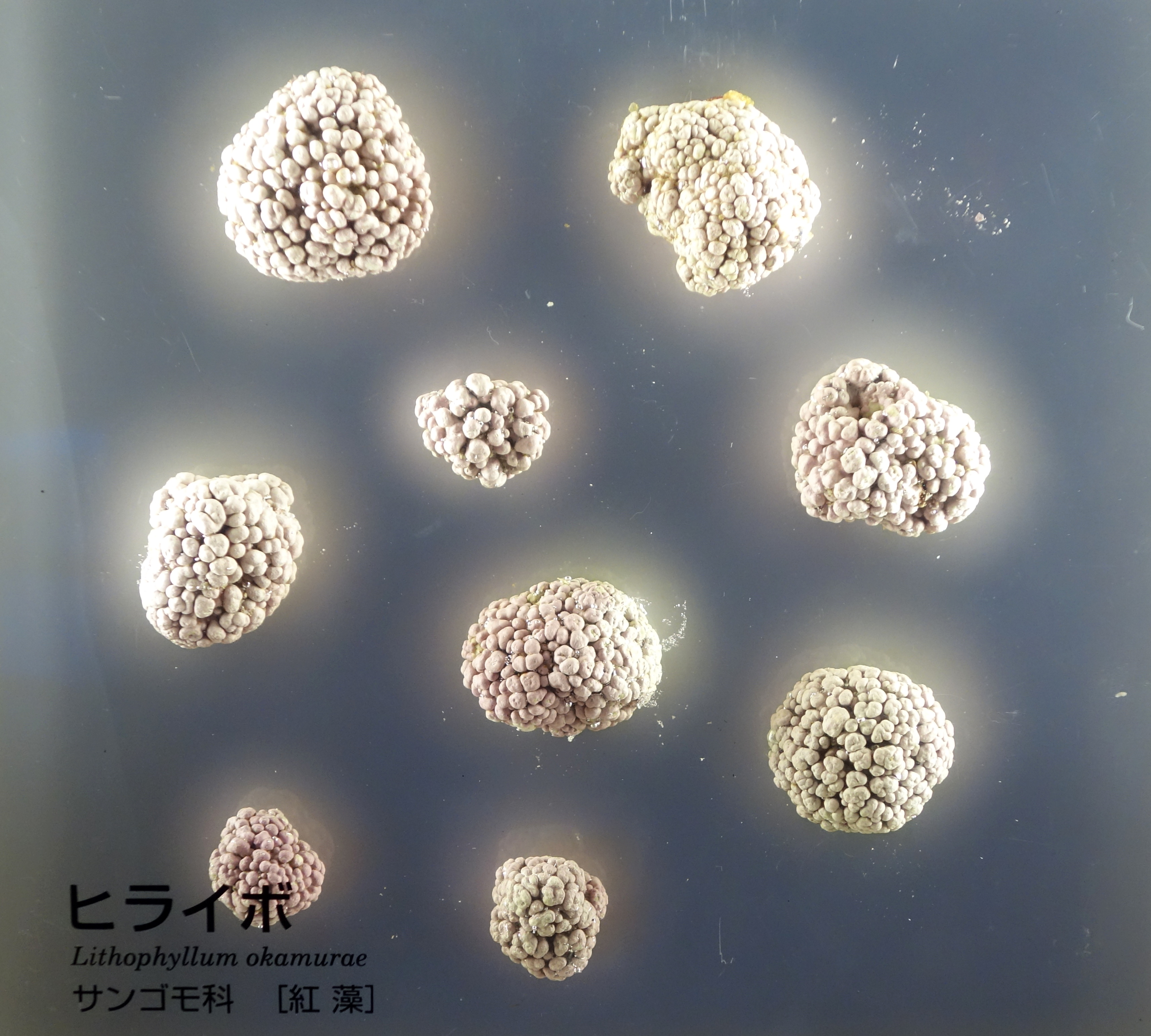
- Lithophyllum red algae
  Lithophyllum – tentative report
- †Lithophysema
- †Lithoporella
- Lithothamnion – tentative report
- †Litorhadia
  - †Litorhadia acala
  - †Litorhadia aldrichiana
  - †Litorhadia elongatoidea
  - †Litorhadia mater
- Longchaeus
  - †Longchaeus larvata
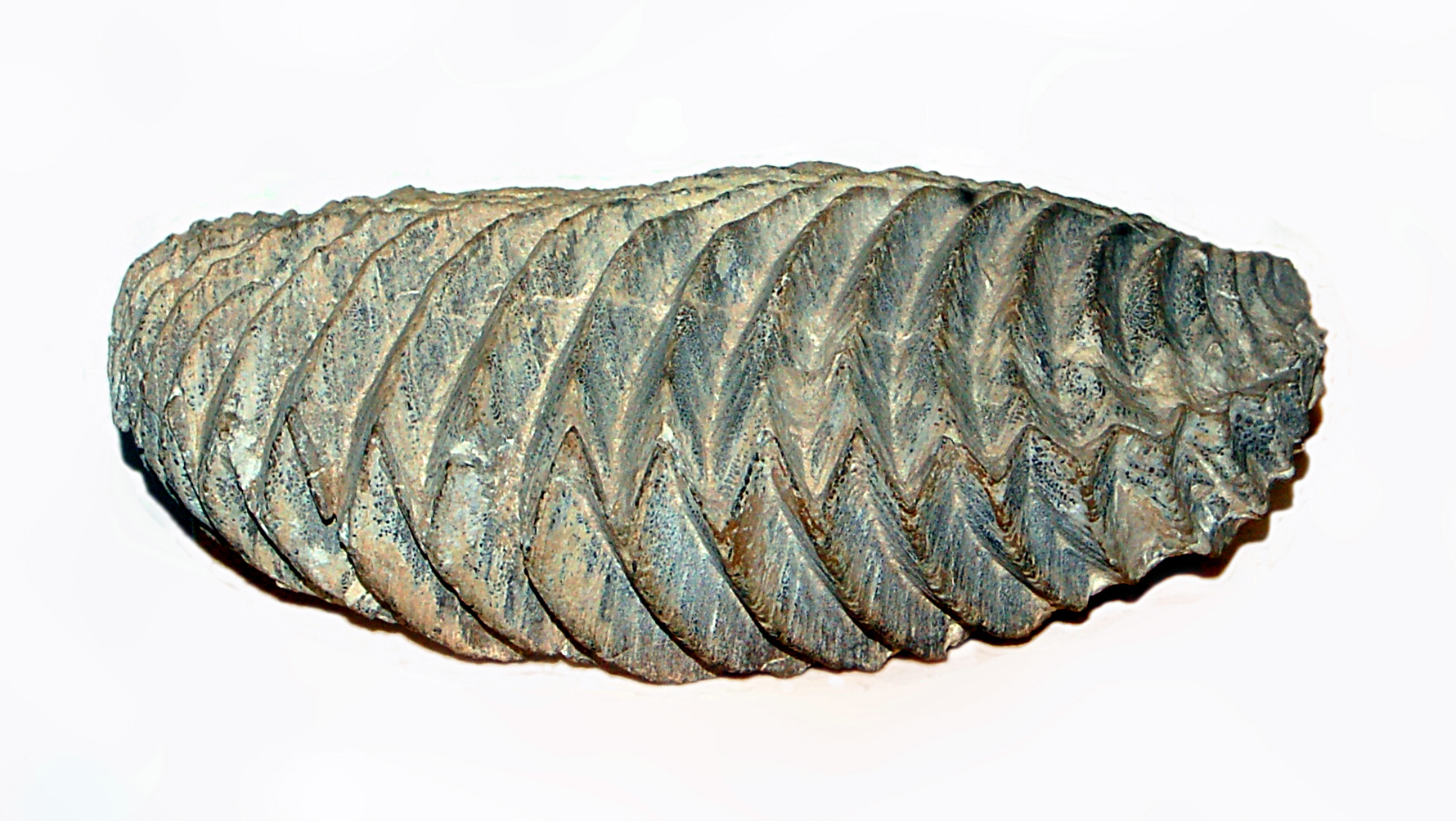
- Fossilized shell of the Triassic-modern marine bivalve Lopha
  Lopha
  - †Lopha vicksburgensis
- †Lophoranina
  - †Lophoranina georgiana
- Loxoconcha
  - †Loxoconcha clarkensis – type locality for species
  - †Loxoconcha cocoaensis
  - †Loxoconcha concentrica
  - †Loxoconcha creolensis
  - †Loxoconcha jacksonensis
  - †Loxoconcha stavensis – type locality for species
  - †Loxoconcha watervalleyensis
- Lucina
  - †Lucina carinifera
  - †Lucina dolabra
  - †Lucina fortidentalis
  - †Lucina hamata
  - †Lucina papyracea
  - †Lucina pomilia
  - †Lucina primoidea
  - †Lucina sylvaerupis
- Lunularia
  - †Lunularia claibornica
  - †Lunularia distans
  - †Lunularia ovata
  - †Lunularia verrucosa – type locality for species
- Lunulites
  - †Lunulites bouei
  - †Lunulites distans
  - †Lunulites jacksonensis
  - †Lunulites truncata
- Lynx
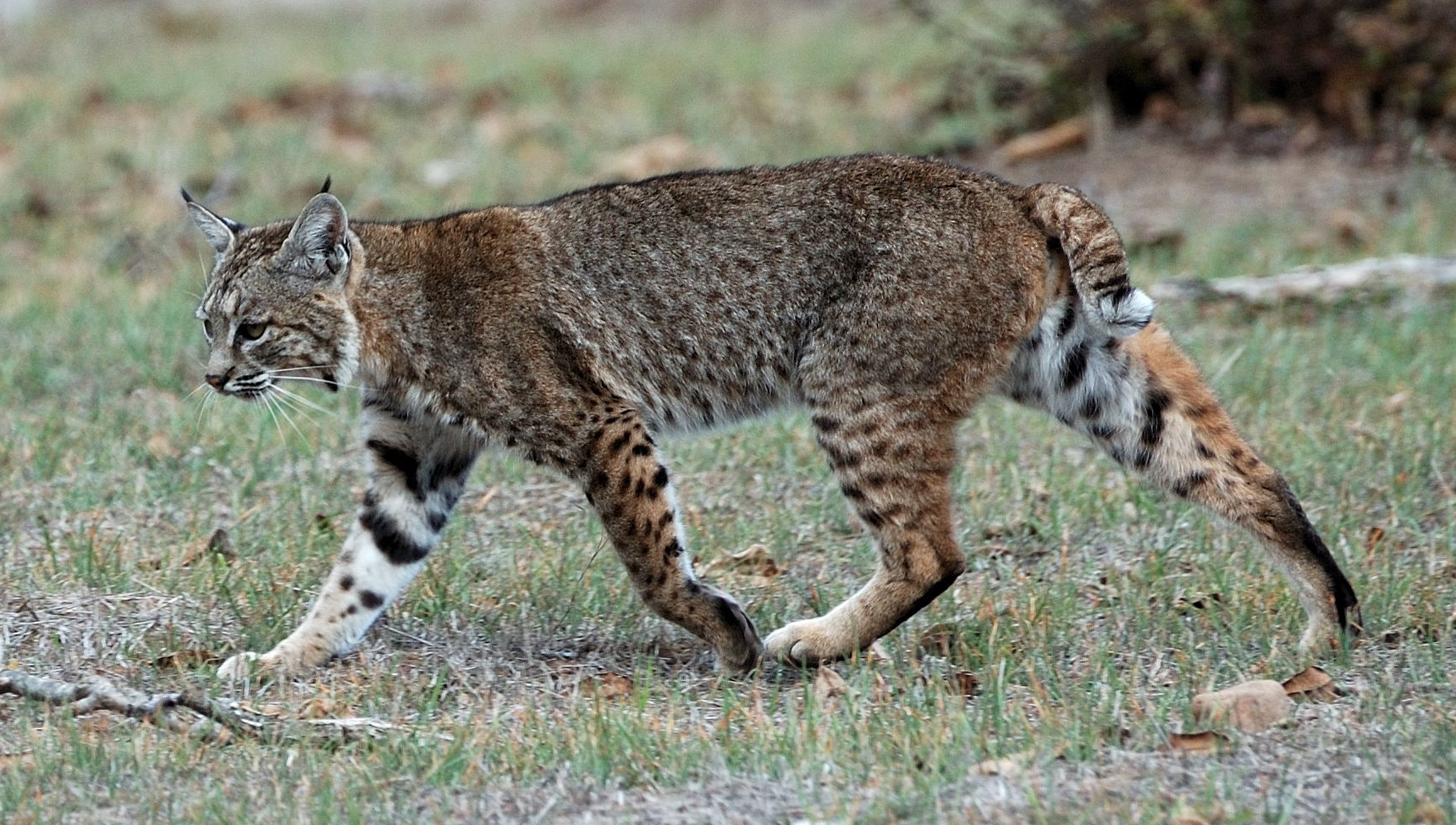
  - A living Lynx rufus, or bobcat
    †Lynx rufus
- Lyria
  - †Lyria lyroidea
  - †Lyria wilcoxiana
- †Lyrodiscus
  - †Lyrodiscus smithvillensis
- †Lyropecten
  - †Lyropecten duncanensis
- †Lyrosurcula
  - †Lyrosurcula dalli
  - †Lyrosurcula funiculigera
  - †Lyrosurcula sexvaricosa
  - †Lyrosurcula shaleri
  - †Lyrosurcula sylvaerupis

== M ==
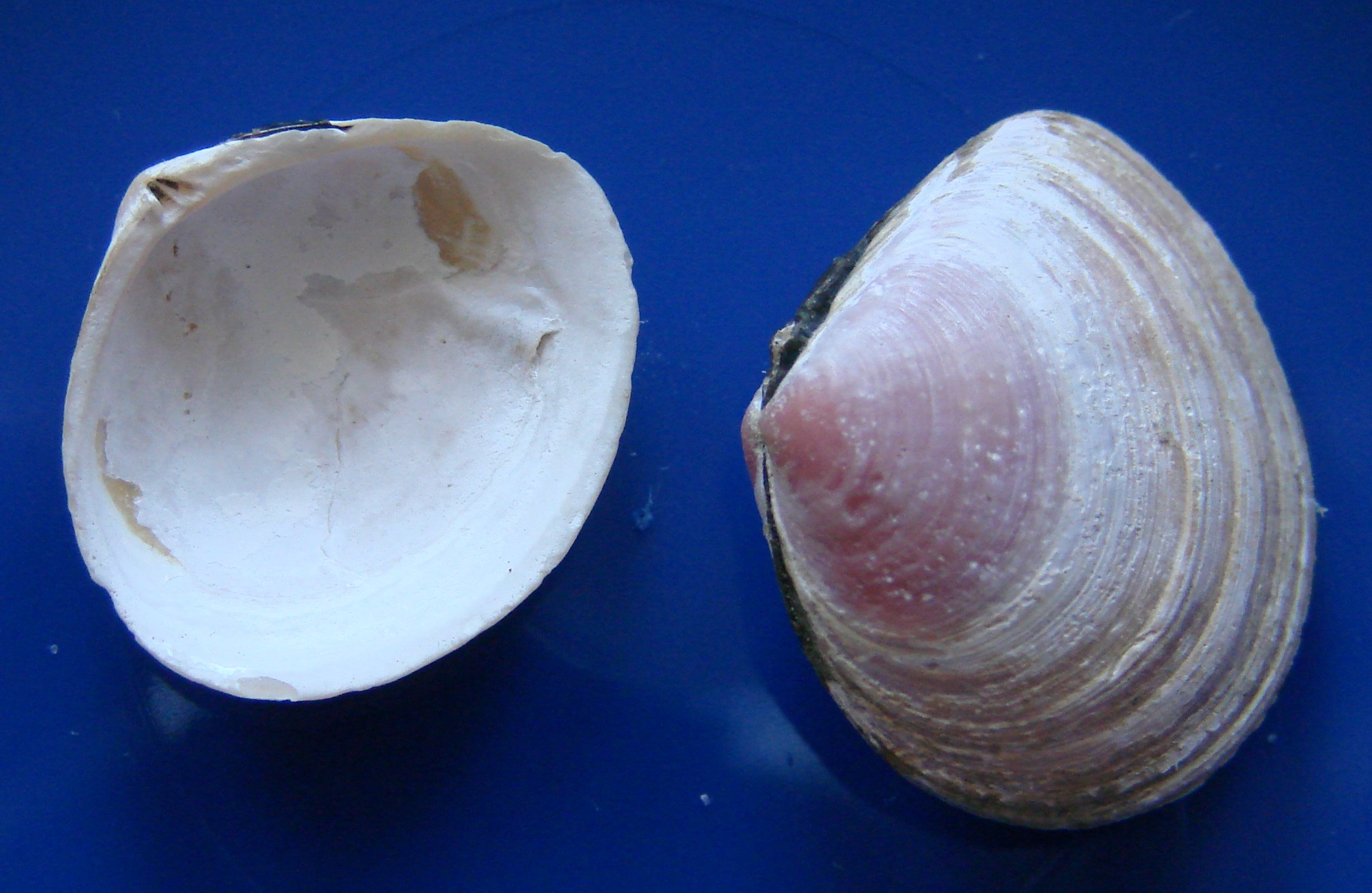
- Interior and exterior of a shell of a Macoma tellin
  Macoma
  - †Macoma danai
  - †Macoma scandula
  - †Macoma sillimani
- Macrocallista
  - †Macrocallista sylvaerupis
- Macropneustes
  - †Macropneustes mortoni
- †Mactropsis
  - †Mactropsis aequorea
  - †Mactropsis rectilinearis
- Madracis
  - †Madracis ganei
  - †Madracis gregorioi – type locality for species
  - †Madracis gregoriori
  - †Madracis herricki
- †Mammut
  - †Mammut americanum
- †Mammuthus
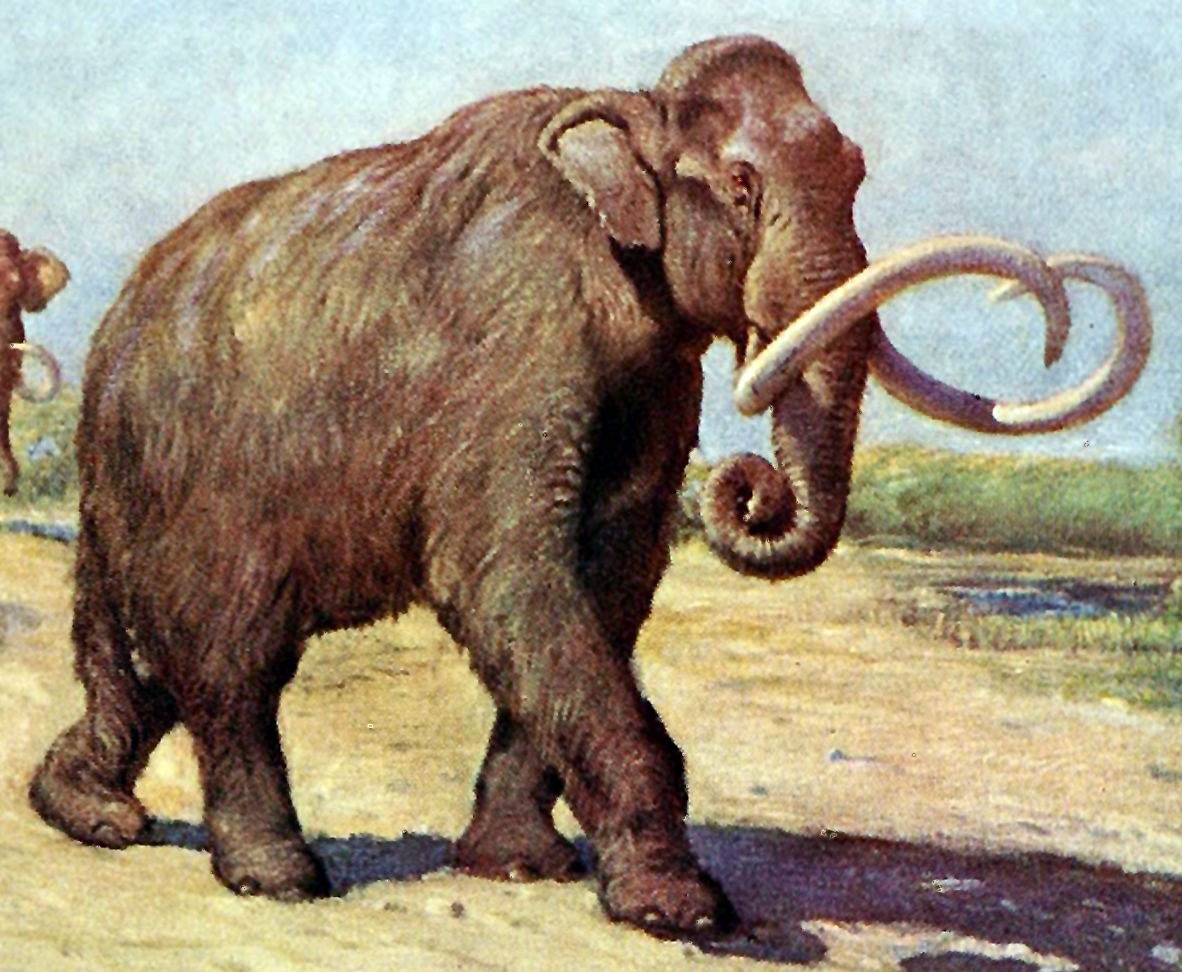
  - Life restoration of a herd of Mammuthus columbi, or Columbian mammoths. The extent of the fur depicted is hypothetical. Charles R. Knight (1909).
    †Mammuthus columbi
- Margaretta
  - †Margaretta parviporosa
  - †Margaretta vicksburgia – type locality for species
  - †Margaretta vicksburgica – type locality for species
- Marginella
  - †Marginella constricta
  - †Marginella constrictoides
  - †Marginella silabra
- Martesia
  - †Martesia elongata
  - †Martesia recurva
- †Mastigophora
  - †Mastigophora hyndmanni
- †Mathilda
  - †Mathilda claibornesis
  - †Mathilda elongatoides
  - †Mathilda leana
  - †Mathilda leona
  - †Mathilda singularis
- †Mazzalina
  - †Mazzalina inaurata
  - †Mazzalina plena
  - †Mazzalina tuomeyi
- Mecynoecia
  - †Mecynoecia cornuta – type locality for species
  - †Mecynoecia elongatobula
  - †Mecynoecia elongatotubre
  - †Mecynoecia lunata
  - †Mecynoecia proboscidea
  - †Mecynoecia quisenberryae
  - †Mecynoecia semota
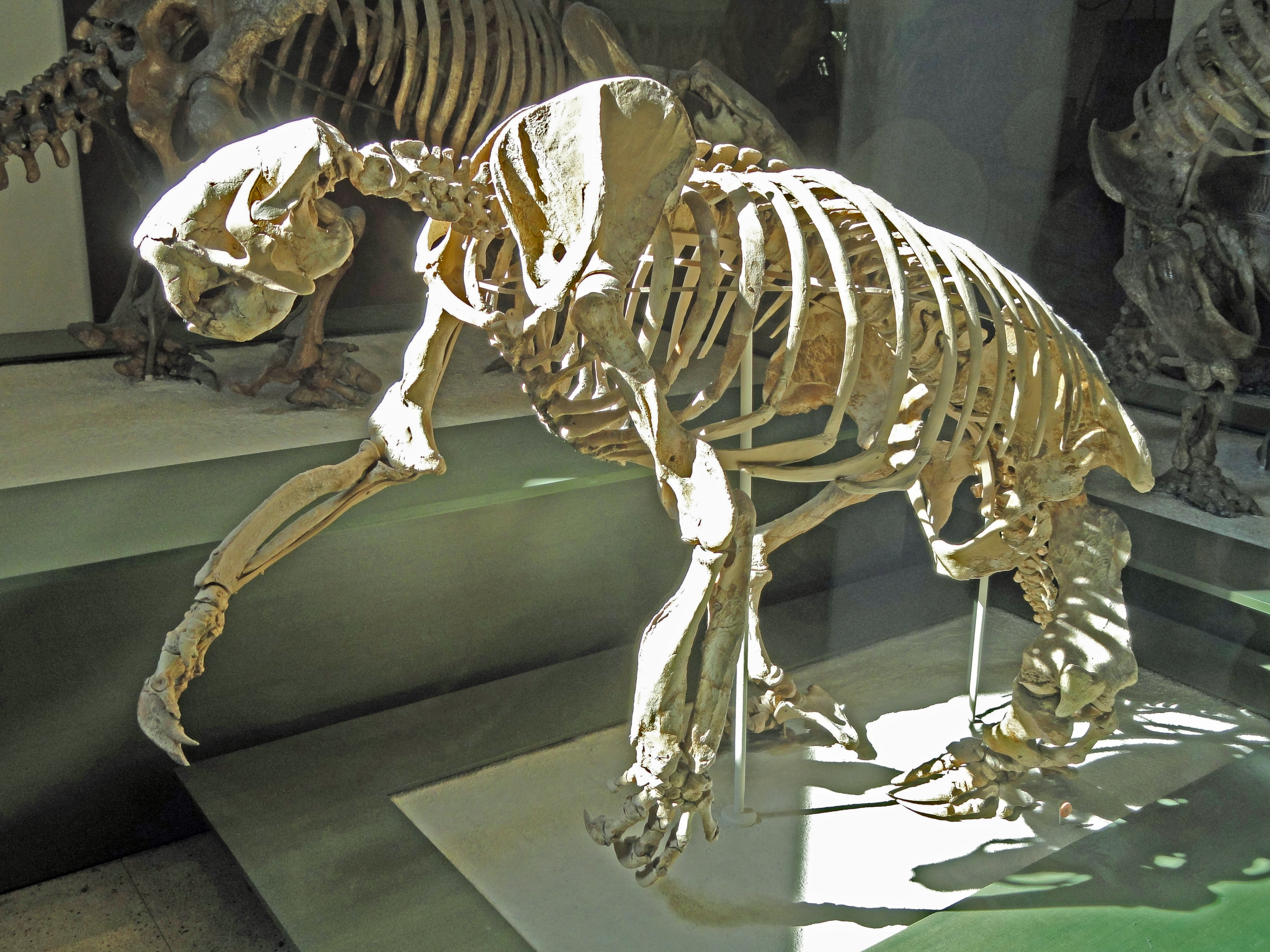
- Mounted fossilized skeleton of the Miocene-Pleistocene ground sloth Megalonyx
  †Megalonyx
  - †Megalonyx jeffersonii
- Melanella
- Melanerpes
  - †Melanerpes carolinus – or unidentified comparable form
- Melanopsis
  - †Melanopsis anita
- Meleagris
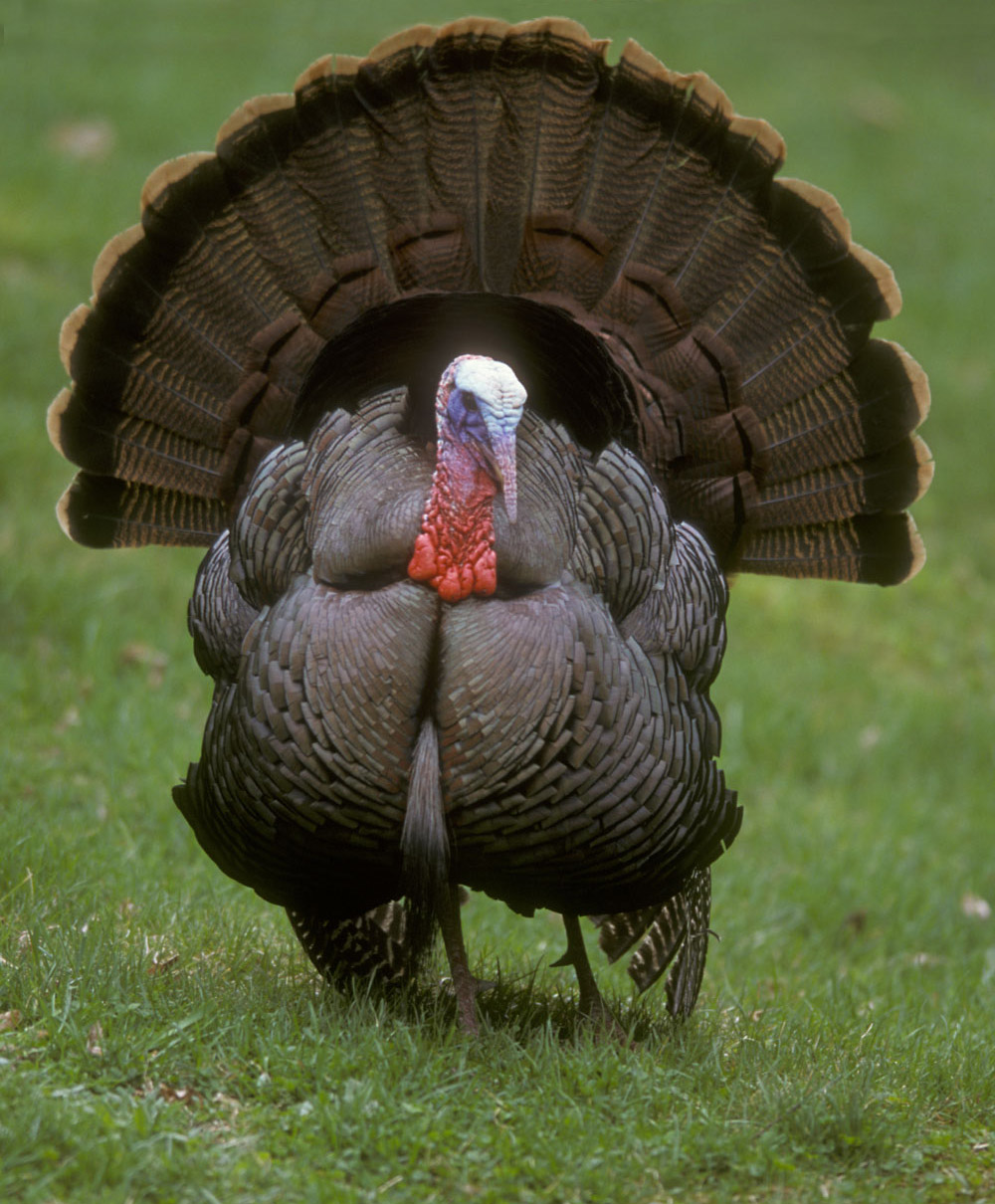
  - A wild male Meleagris gallopavo, or turkey, displaying his facial coloration and tail feathers to attract a female
    †Meleagris gallopavo
- †Membranioporella – tentative report
  - †Membranioporella subgossizi – type locality for species
- Membranipora
  - †Membranipora arcana – type locality for species
  - †Membranipora tubulosa – type locality for species
- Membraniporella – tentative report
- Membraniporidra
  - †Membraniporidra similis
  - †Membraniporidra spissimuralis
- †Membraniporina
  - †Membraniporina sinesolum
- †Mercimonia – tentative report
  - †Mercimonia mercenaroidea
- Meretrix
  - †Meretrix ripleyana
- Mergus
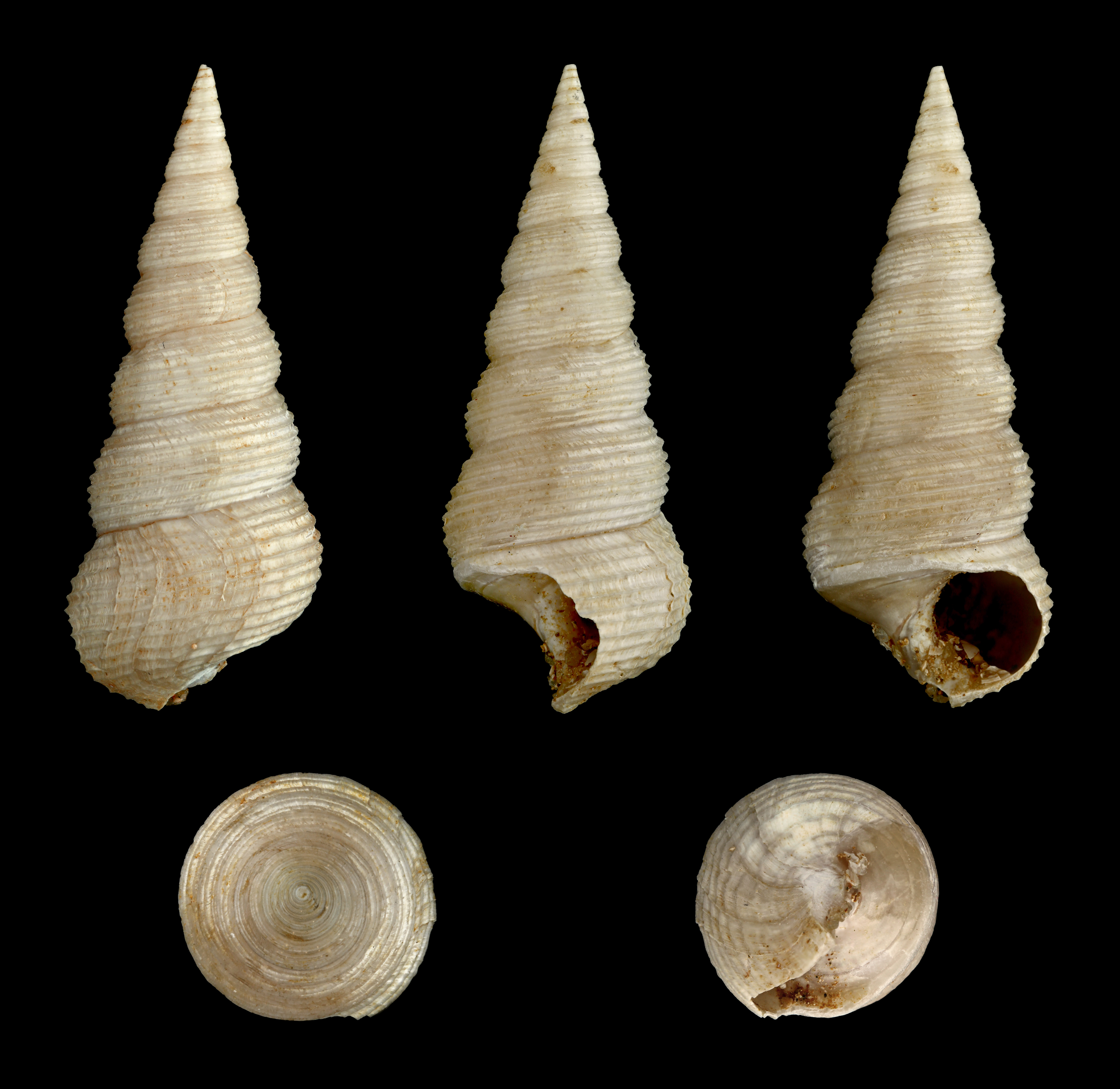
- Multiple views of a fossilized shell of Mesalia tower sea snail
  Mesalia
  - †Mesalia alabamiensis
  - †Mesalia allentonensis
  - †Mesalia biplicata
  - †Mesalia bowlesi
  - †Mesalia claibornensis
  - †Mesalia persa
  - †Mesalia pumila
  - †Mesalia vetusta
  - †Mesalia watsonensis
- †Mesomorpha
  - †Mesomorpha duncani – type locality for species
- Mesophyllum
- †Mesorhytis
  - †Mesorhytis hatchetigbeensis
- †Metradolium
  - †Metradolium transversum
- Metrarabdotos
  - †Metrarabdotos grande – type locality for species
  - †Metrarabdotos moniliferum
- Metula
  - †Metula sylvaerupis
- †Michela
  - †Michela trabeatoides
- †Micrancilla
  - †Micrancilla alibamasiana – type locality for species
- Microdrillia
  - †Microdrillia infans
  - †Microdrillia robustula
  - †Microdrillia rostratula
  - †Microdrillia turriculata
- Microecia
  - †Microecia hirta
  - †Microecia vibrio
- Micromeris
  - †Micromeris minutissima
- Micropora
  - †Micropora coriacea
- Microtus
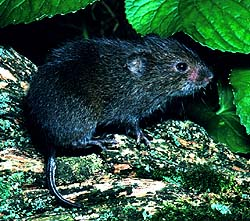
  - A living Microtus pennsylvanicus, or meadow vole
    †Microtus pennsylvanicus
- Miltha
  - †Miltha claibornensis
  - †Miltha gaufia
  - †Miltha greggi
  - †Miltha pandata
- Miodontiscus – or unidentified comparable form
  - †Miodontiscus aldrichianus
  - †Miodontiscus timothii
- Mitrella
  - †Mitrella alabamensis
  - †Mitrella bucciniformis
  - †Mitrella erecta
  - †Mitrella parva
- Mitrolumna
  - †Mitrolumna eocenensis
- Mnestia
  - †Mnestia dekayi
- Modiolaria
  - †Modiolaria alabamensis
- Modiolus
  - †Modiolus cretaceus
  - †Modiolus saffordi
- †Monoceratina
  - †Monoceratina alexanderi
- †Monoptygma
  - †Monoptygma curtum
  - †Monoptygma leai
  - †Monoptygma lymneoides
- Montacuta
  - †Montacuta bicuspidata
  - †Montacuta claiborniana
  - †Montacuta herberti
- †Multiporina
  - †Multiporina parvipora – type locality for species
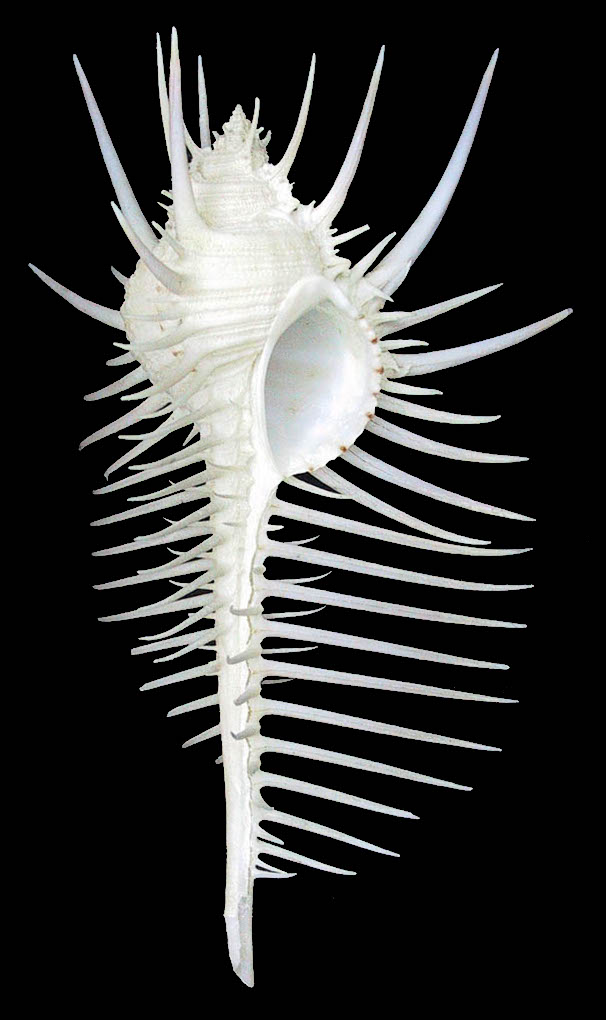
- Shell of a Murex sea snail
  Murex
  - †Murex fusates
  - †Murex gosportensis
  - †Murex migus
  - †Murex septemnarius
- Murexiella
  - †Murexiella crispangula – type locality for species
  - †Murexiella mantelli – type locality for species
- †Murotriton
  - †Murotriton grassator
  - †Murotriton mcglameriae
- Myliobatis
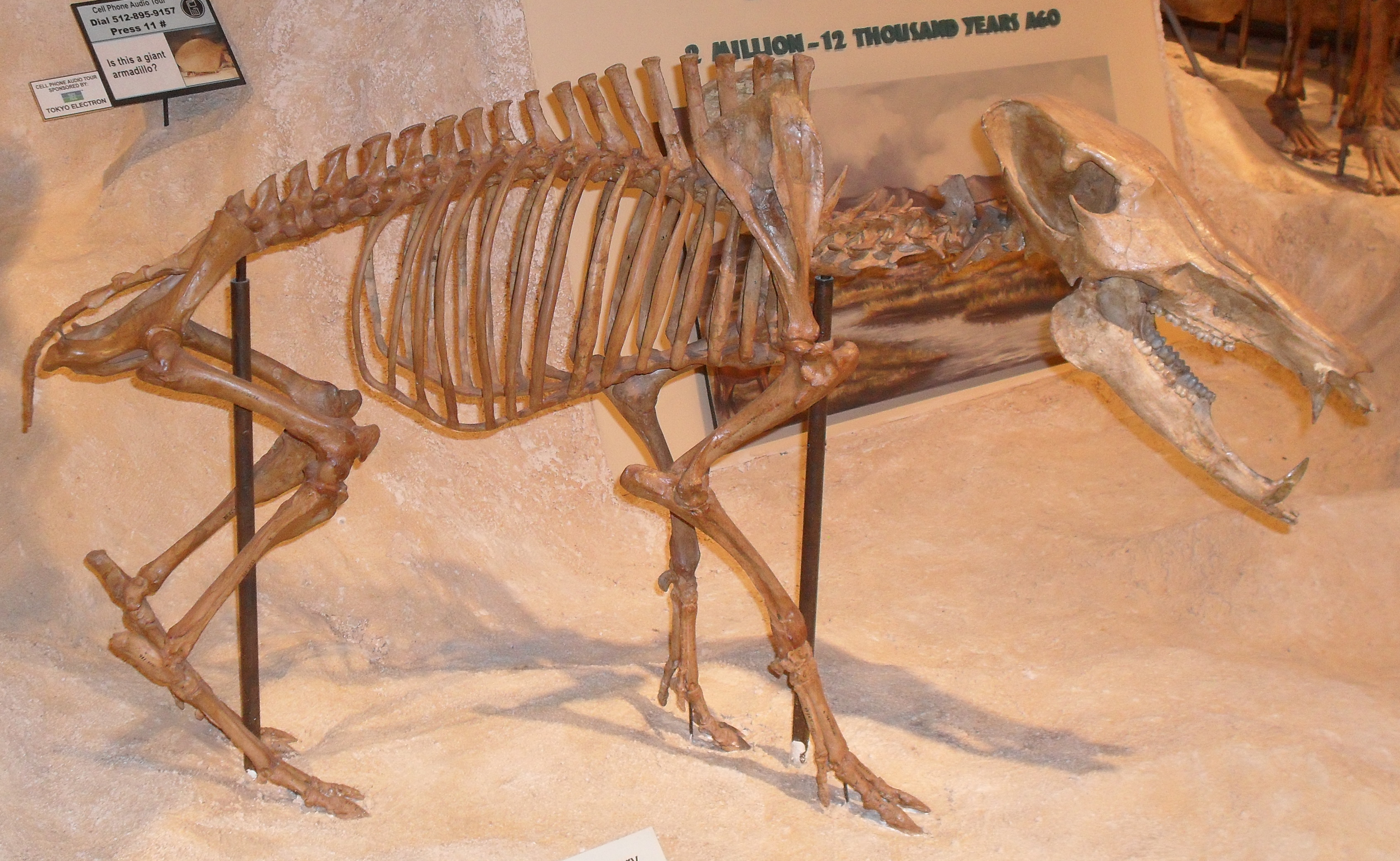
- Fossilized skeleton of the Pliocene-Holocene peccary Mylohyus
  †Mylohyus
  - †Mylohyus fossilis
- Myotis
  - †Myotis lucifugus
- Myrtea
  - †Myrtea astartiformis
  - †Myrtea bisculpta
  - †Myrtea ulrichi
- Mysella
  - †Mysella dalli
  - †Mysella minuta

== N ==
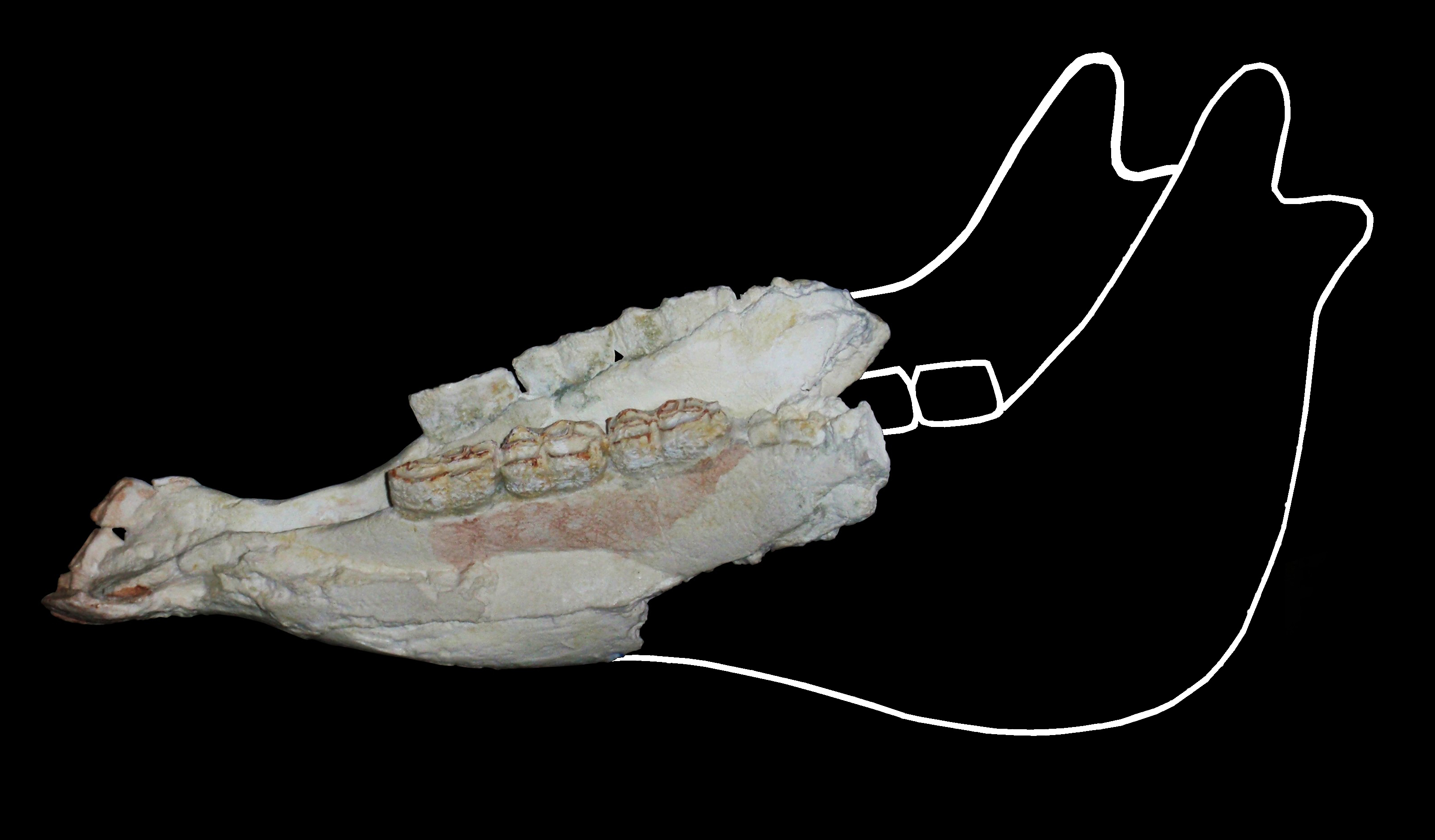
- Partial fossilized mandible of the Miocene-Pliocene horse Nannippus
  †Nannippus
  - †Nannippus aztecus
  - †Nannippus lenticularis – or unidentified comparable form
- †Nanohalus
  - †Nanohalus cossmanni
- Narona
  - †Narona greggi
  - †Narona quercollis
- Nassarius
  - †Nassarius exilis
- Natica
  - †Natica aperta
  - †Natica gilberti
  - †Natica magnoumbilicata
  - †Natica mediavia
  - †Natica onusta
  - †Natica permunda
  - †Natica reversa
  - †Natica saffordia
- Naticarius
  - †Naticarius reversa
  - †Naticarius semilunata
- Nebrius
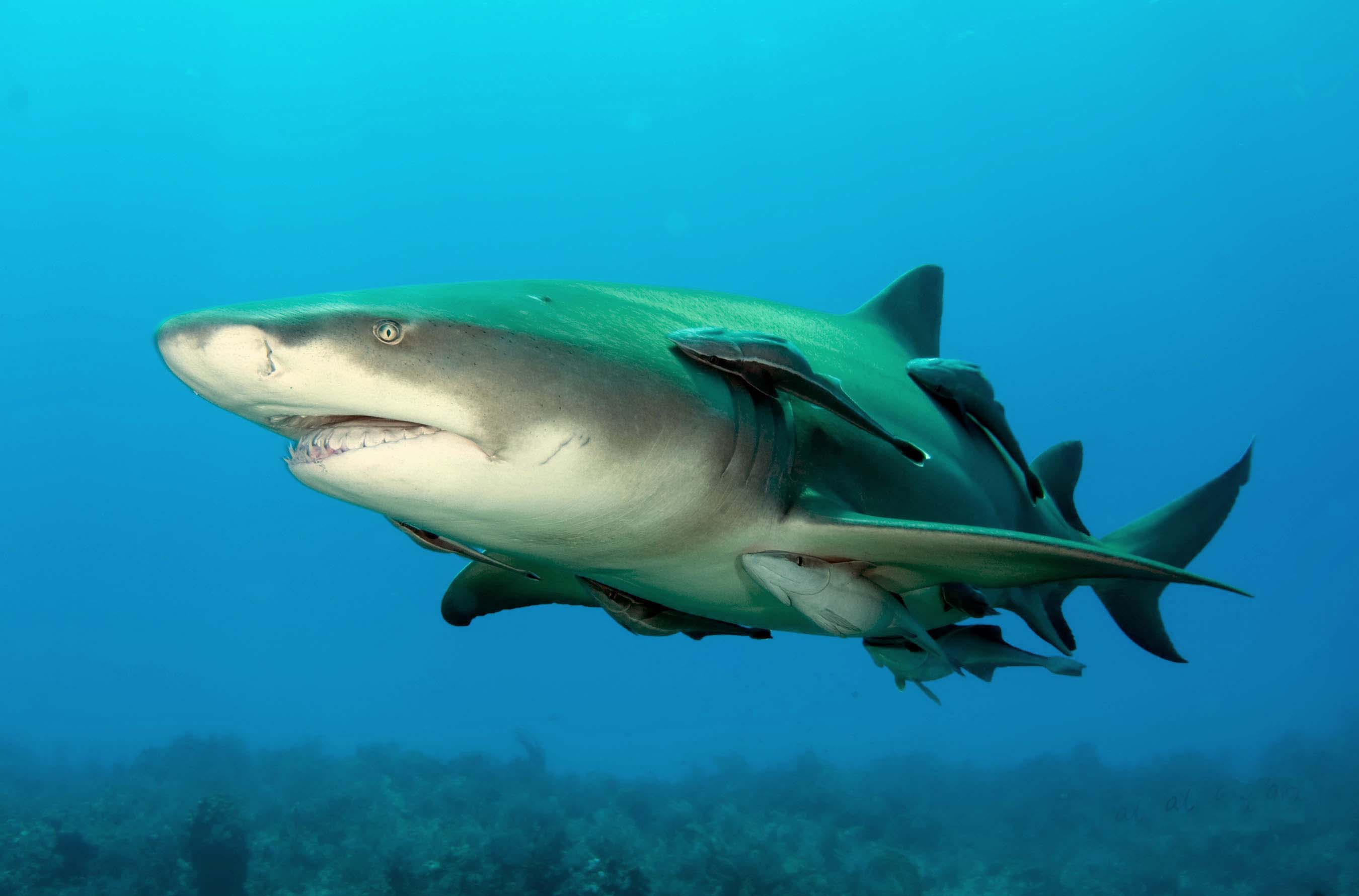
- A living Negaprion, or lemon shark
  Negaprion
  - †Negaprion gibbsi
- Nellia
  - †Nellia bifaciata
  - †Nellia midwayanica
  - †Nellia tenella
- †Nemipterus
  - †Nemipterus caribbaeus – type locality for species
- Nemocardium
  - †Nemocardium gambrinum
  - †Nemocardium harrisi
  - †Nemocardium lene
  - †Nemocardium nicolletti
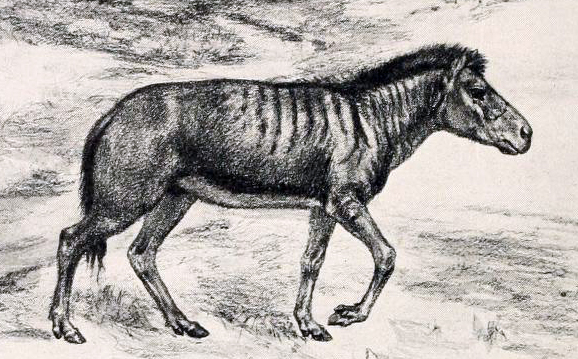
- Life restoration of a herd of Neohipparion. Robert Bruce Horsfall (1913).
  †Neohipparion
  - †Neohipparion eurystyle
- Neotoma
  - †Neotoma floridana
- Neritina
  - †Neritina unidenta
- Nerodia
  - †Nerodia sipeodon
- Neverita
  - †Neverita limula
- Niso
  - †Niso umbilicata
- Nodosaria
- Nonion
  - †Nonion planatum
- Nonionella
  - †Nonionella hantekeni
- Norrisia
  - †Norrisia micromphala
  - †Norrisia nautiloides
  - †Norrisia nitens
  - †Norrisia parva
- Nucleolites
  - †Nucleolites conradi
  - †Nucleolites gouldii
- †Nucleopsis
  - †Nucleopsis subvaricata
- Nucula
  - †Nucula capsiopsis
  - †Nucula magnifica
  - †Nucula mauricensis
  - †Nucula mediavia
  - †Nucula monroensis
  - †Nucula ovula
  - †Nucula potomacensis
  - †Nucula ripae
  - †Nucula sphenopsis
- Nuculana
  - †Nuculana bella
  - †Nuculana coelata
  - †Nuculana coelatella – tentative report
  - †Nuculana corpulentoides
  - †Nuculana crassiparva
  - †Nuculana fiski
  - †Nuculana magna
  - †Nuculana marieana
  - †Nuculana milamensis
  - †Nuculana multilineata
  - †Nuculana ozarkola
  - †Nuculana plana
  - †Nuculana saffordana
  - †Nuculana trumani
  - †Nuculana wautubbeana
- Nycticeius
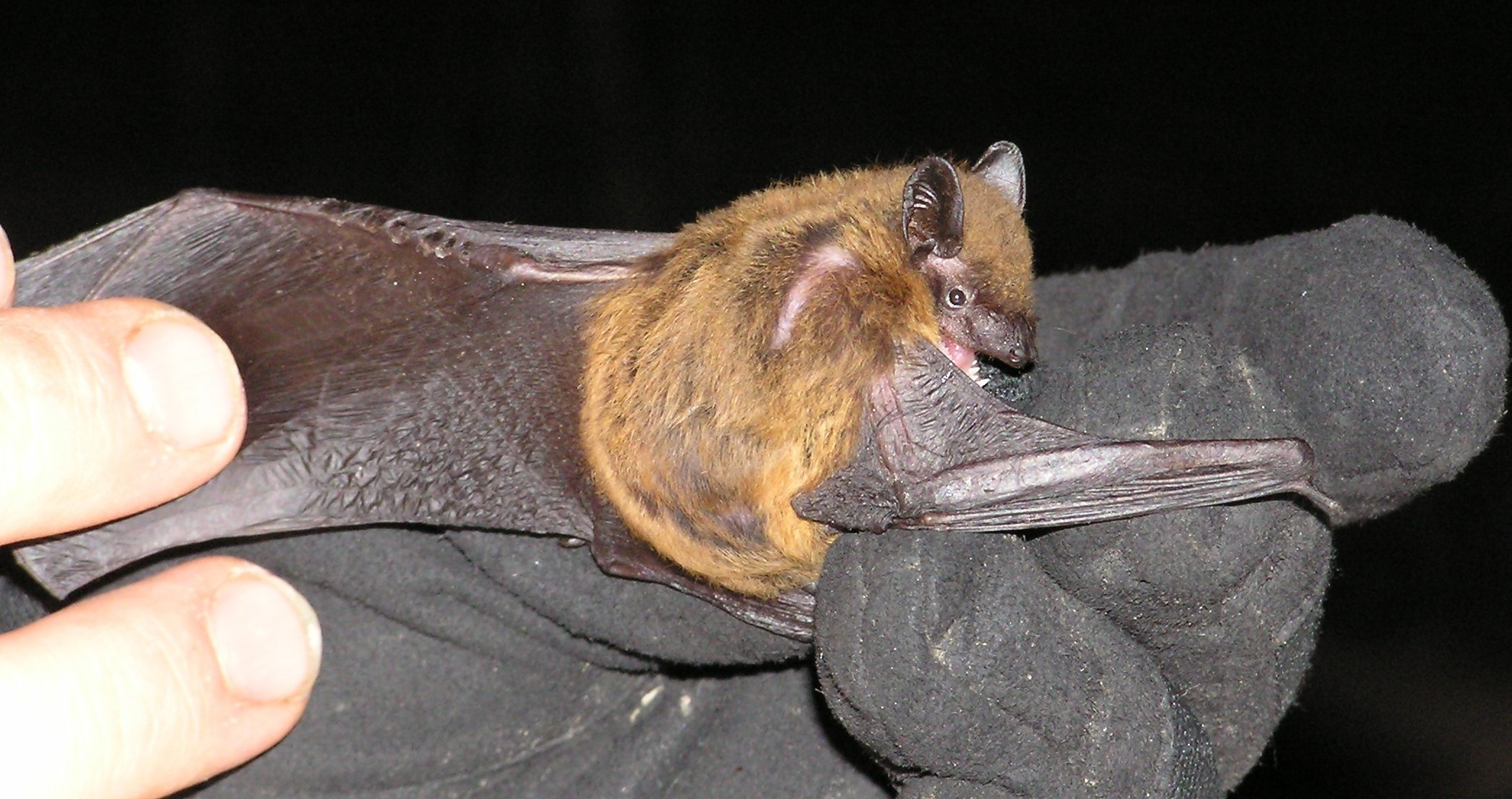
  - A living Nycticeius humeralis, or evening bat
    †Nycticeius humeralis

== O ==
- Oculina – type locality for genus
  - †Oculina alabamensis – type locality for species
  - †Oculina smithi – type locality for species
  - †Oculina wagneriana – type locality for species
- Odocoileus
  - †Odocoileus virginianus
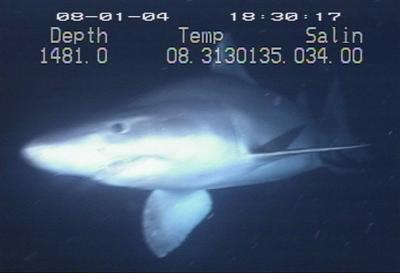
- A living Odontaspis sand shark
  Odontaspis
  - †Odontaspis hopei
  - †Odontaspis macrota
  - †Odontaspis malletiana – type locality for species
  - †Odontaspis speyeri
  - †Odontaspis verticalis – tentative report
- †Odontogryphaea
  - †Odontogryphaea thirsae
- †Odontopolys
  - †Odontopolys compsorhytis
  - †Odontopolys sublevis
- Illustration of a shell of Odostomia sea snails (reddish)
  Odostomia
  - †Odostomia insignifica
  - †Odostomia laevis
  - †Odostomia matthewsensis
- †Oligopygus
  - †Oligopygus haldemani
  - †Oligopygus rotundus
- Oliva
  - †Oliva platonica
- Olivella
  - †Olivella mediavia
  - †Olivella semilignitica
- Oncousoecia
  - †Oncousoecia quinqueseriata
  - †Oncousoecia varians
- Opheodrys
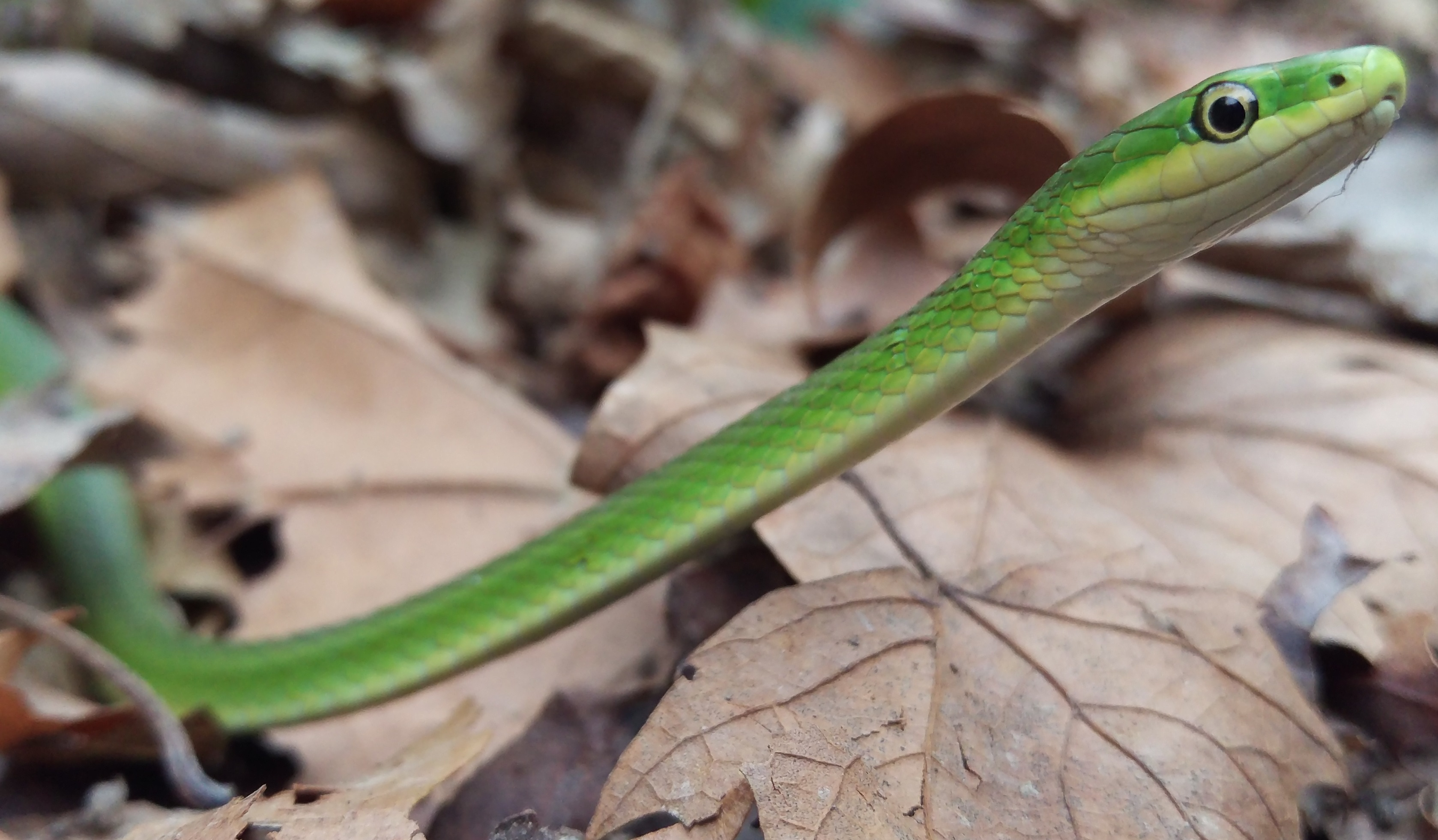
  - A living Opheodrys aestivus, or rough green snake
    †Opheodrys aestivus
- †Orthosurcula
  - †Orthosurcula adeona
  - †Orthosurcula indenta
  - †Orthosurcula langdoni
  - †Orthosurcula longipersa
  - †Orthosurcula persa
- Orthoyoldia
  - †Orthoyoldia psammotaea
- †Oryctomya – or unidentified comparable form
  - †Oryctomya prima
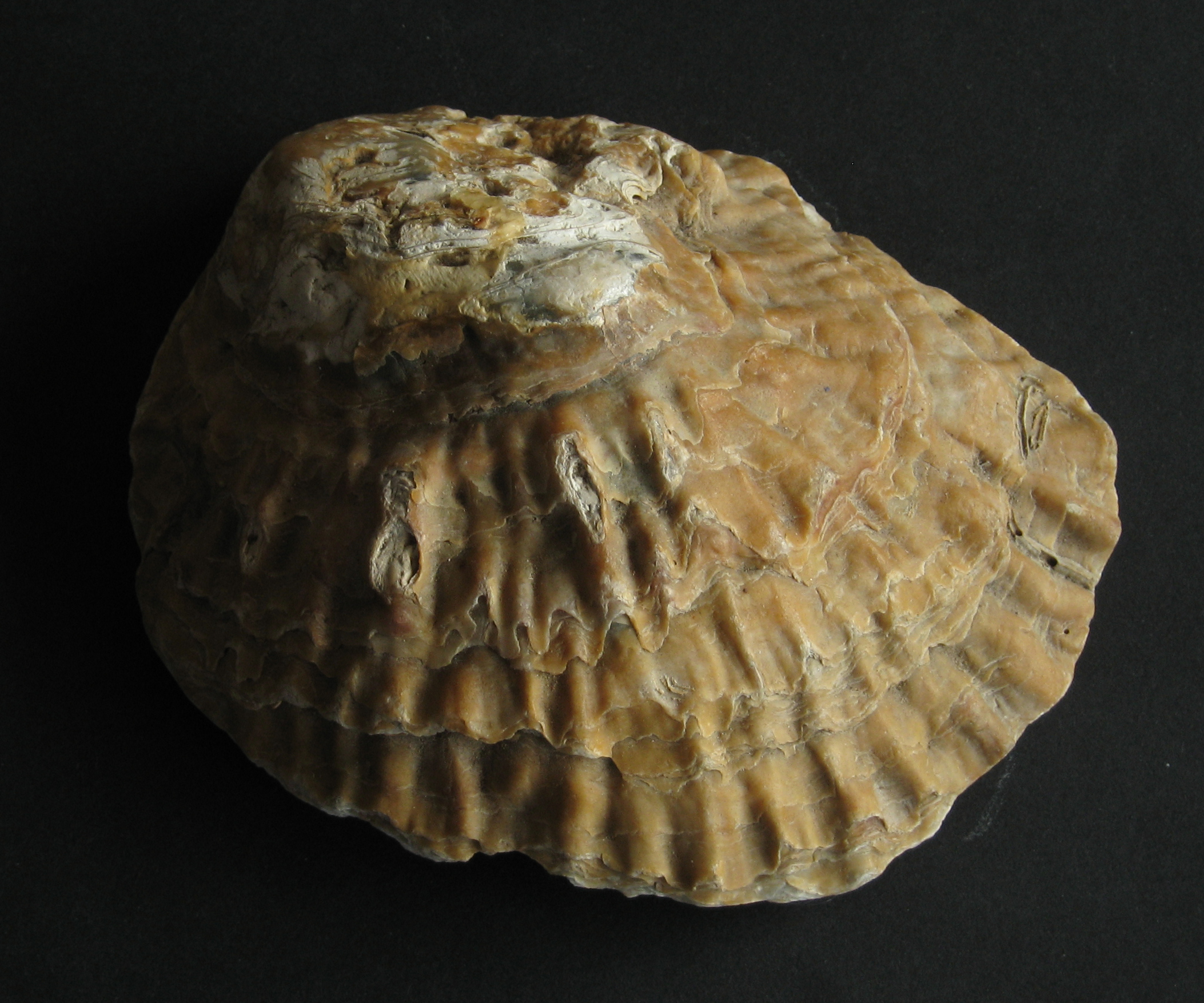
- Shell of an Ostrea, or oyster
  Ostrea
  - †Ostrea arrosis
  - †Ostrea crenulimarginata
  - †Ostrea falco
  - †Ostrea glauconoides
  - †Ostrea intermedoides
  - †Ostrea johnsoni
  - †Ostrea ludoviciana
  - †Ostrea pulaskensis
  - †Ostrea selaeformis
  - †Ostrea sinuosa
- Otionella
  - †Otionella perforata
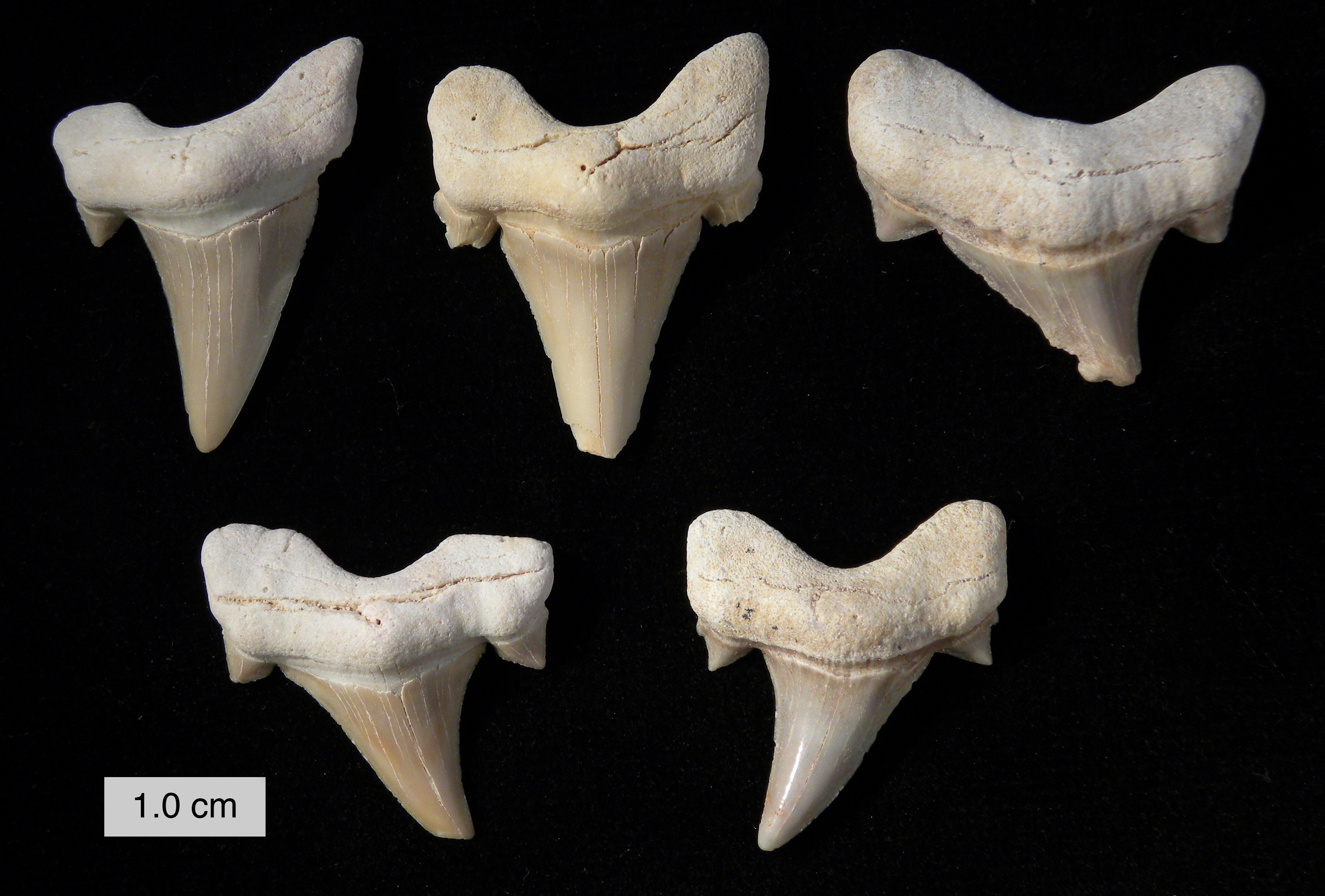
- Fossilized teeth of the Paleocene–Miocene shark Otodus
  †Otodus
  - †Otodus angustidens
- †Otostomia
  - †Otostomia melanella
- Otus
  - †Otus asio
- Ovulactaeon
  - †Ovulactaeon aldrichi
- †Oxyrhina
  - †Oxyrhina praecursor

== P ==
- †Pachecoa
  - †Pachecoa catonis
  - †Pachecoa decisa
  - †Pachecoa declivis
  - †Pachecoa ellipsis
  - †Pachecoa ledoides
  - †Pachecoa lisbonensis
  - †Pachecoa microcancellata
  - †Pachecoa ovalis
  - †Pachecoa pectuncularis
  - †Pachecoa perplana
  - †Pachecoa pulchra
- †Palaeohypotodus
  - †Palaeohypotodus rutoti – or unidentified comparable form
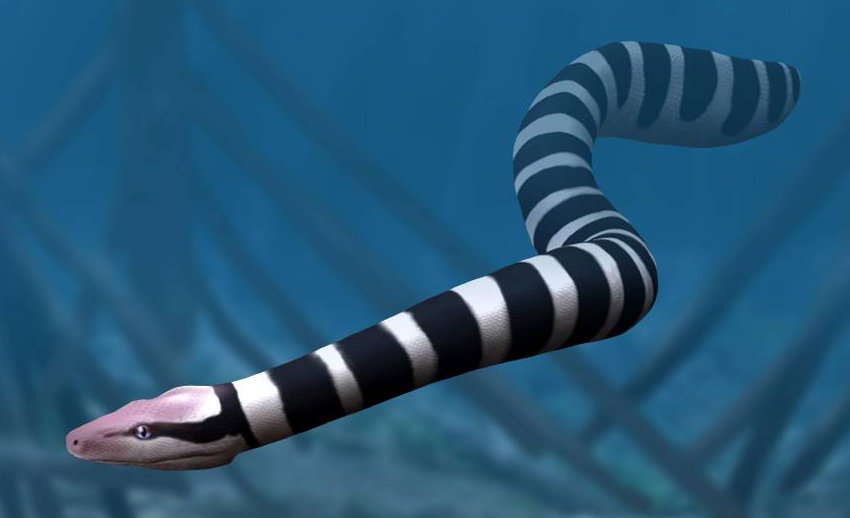
- Restoration of the Cretaceous-Eocene sea snake Palaeophis
  †Palaeophis
  - †Palaeophis virginianus
- †Palaeorhaphis
  - †Palaeorhaphis pergracilis
- Panopea
  - †Panopea alabama
  - †Panopea bellsensis
  - †Panopea oblongata
  - †Panopea porrectoides
- Panthera
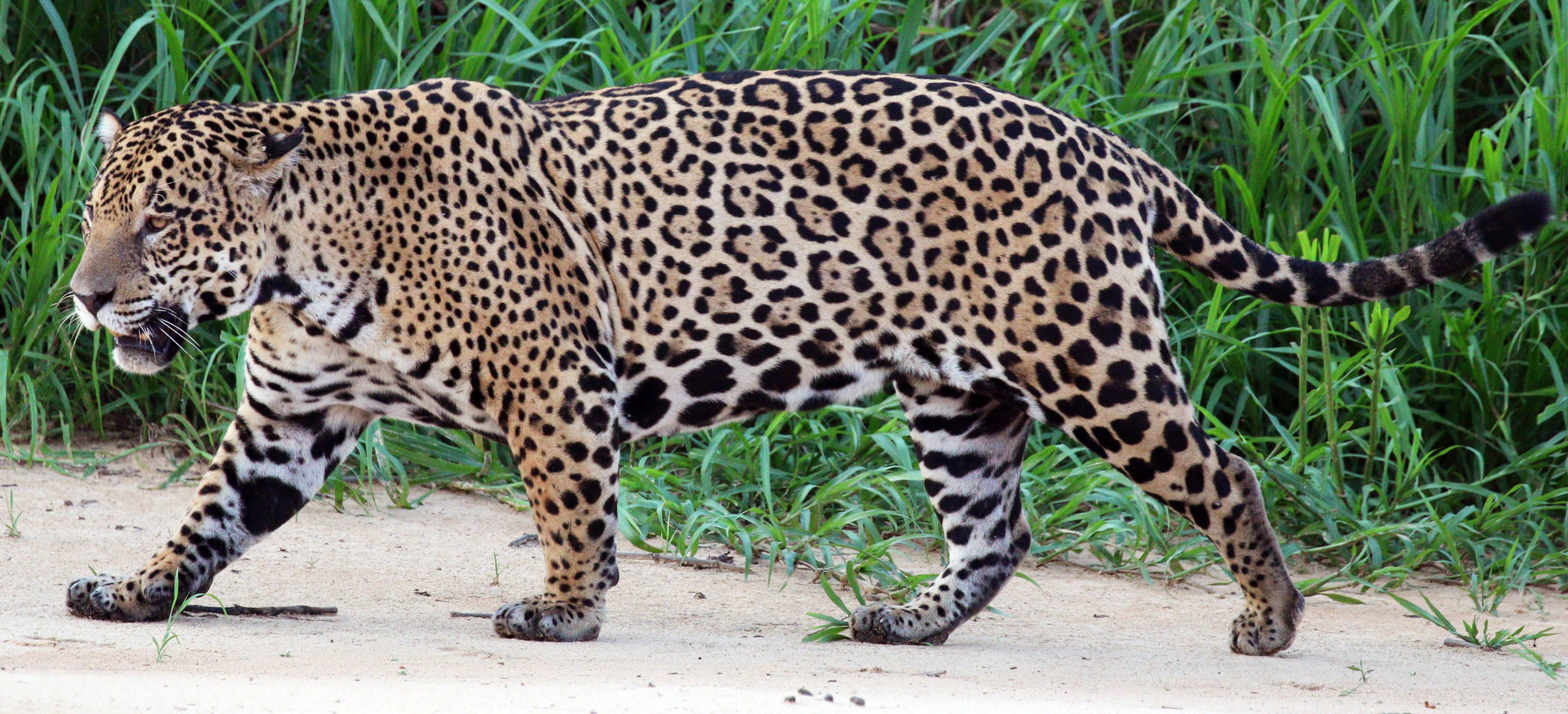
  - A living Panthera onca, or jaguar
    †Panthera onca
- †Papillina
  - †Papillina altilis
  - †Papillina cooperi
  - †Papillina dumosa
  - †Papillina mohri
  - †Papillina papillata
  - †Papillina staminea
- Paracyathus
  - †Paracyathus bellus
  - †Paracyathus cylindricus – type locality for species
  - †Paracyathus granulosus – type locality for species
  - †Paracyathus rugosus – type locality for species
- Paracypris
  - †Paracypris franquesi
- Paracytheridea
  - †Paracytheridea belhavenensis
- †Parmicorbula – or unidentified comparable form
  - †Parmicorbula gibbosa
- Pasithea
  - †Pasithea guttula
  - †Pasithea striata
- †Pasitheola
  - †Pasitheola claibornensis
  - †Pasitheola guttula
  - †Pasitheola tornatelloides
- †Patulaxis
  - †Patulaxis scrobiculata
- Pecten
  - †Pecten byramensis
  - †Pecten howei
  - †Pecten perlanus
  - †Pecten perplanus
  - †Pecten poulsoni
- †Pediomeryx
- Pekania
  - †Pekania pennanti
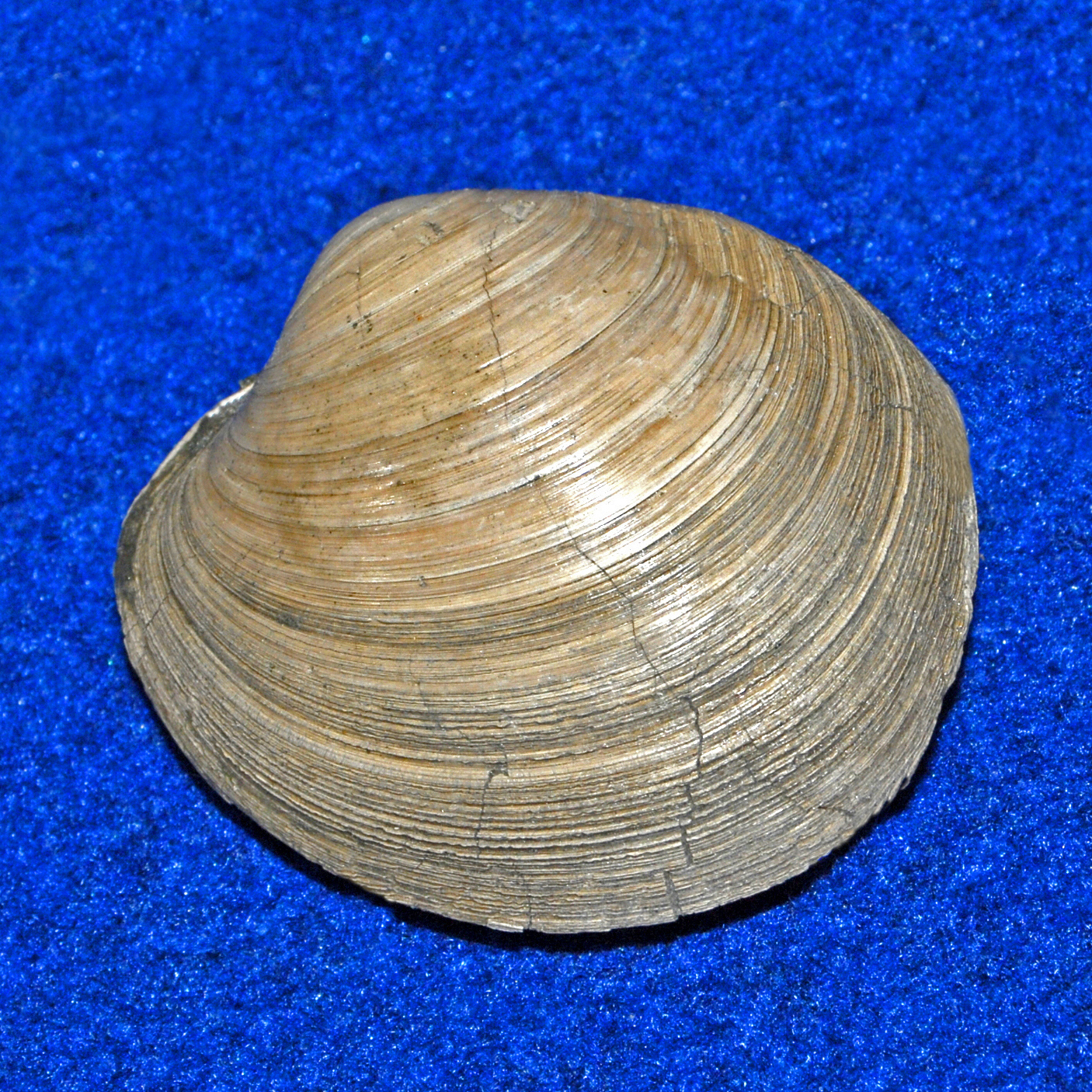
- Fossilized shell of a Pelecyora venus clam
  Pelecyora
  - †Pelecyora hatchetigbeensis
- Penion
  - †Penion bellus
  - †Penion crebrissimus
  - †Penion delabechii
  - †Penion gracilis
  - †Penion imbricatulus
  - †Penion leai
- †Periarchus
  - †Periarchus lyelli
  - †Periarchus pileussinensis
  - †Periarchus protuberans
- Perigastrella
  - †Perigastrella costellifera
  - †Perigastrella oscitans
  - †Perigastrella ovoidea
  - †Perigastrella plana
  - †Perigastrella trapezoidea
- Periploma
  - †Periploma butlerianum
  - †Periploma claibornense
  - †Periploma collardi
  - †Periploma complicatum
- †Perissolax
  - †Perissolax eocensis
- †Peristomella
  - †Peristomella coccinea
  - †Peristomella erecta – type locality for species
- Peromyscus
- Petricola
  - †Petricola claibornensis
- Petrophyllia
  - †Petrophyllia gardnerae – type locality for species
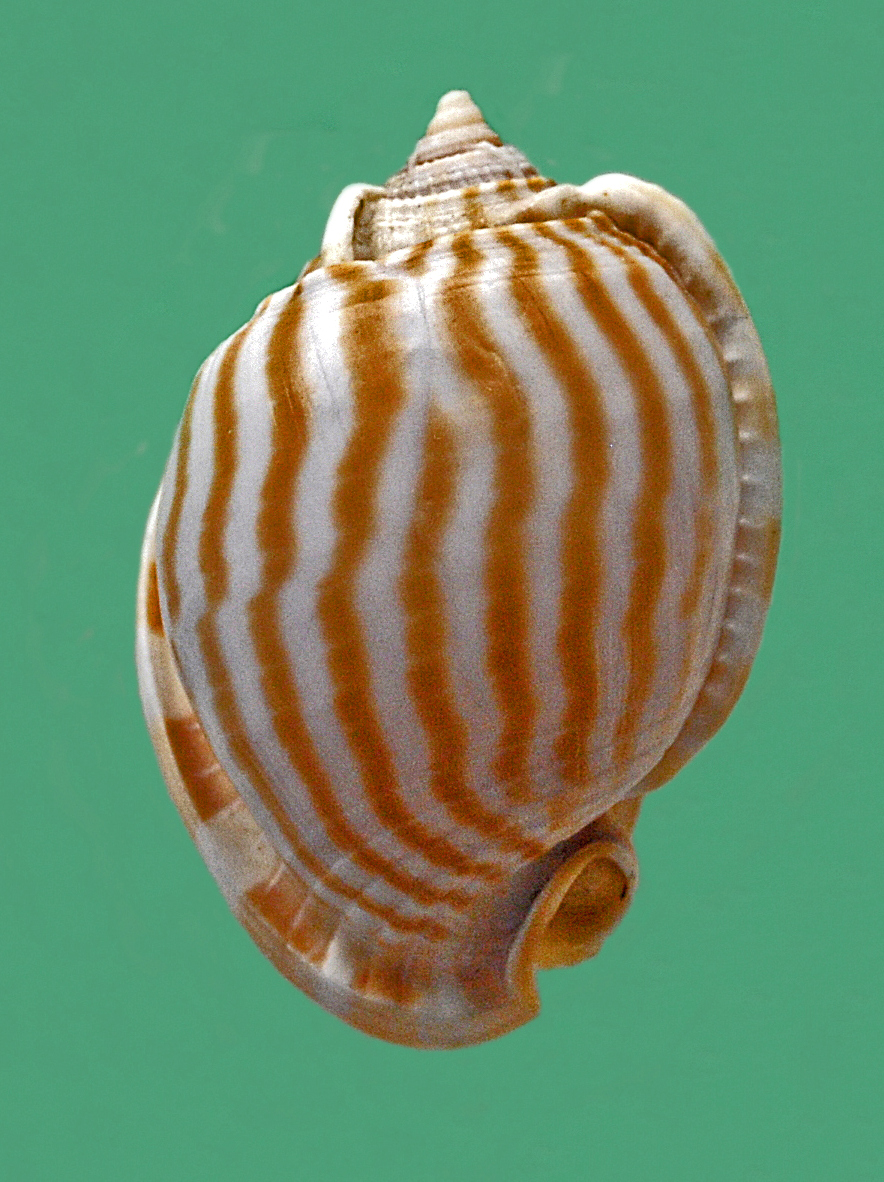
- Shell of a Phalium, or bonnet shell sea snail
  Phalium
  - †Phalium brevicostatum
  - †Phalium taitii
- Philine
  - †Philine alabamensis
- Pholadomya
  - †Pholadomya claibornensis
- Pholas
  - †Pholas alatoidea
  - †Pholas aldrichi
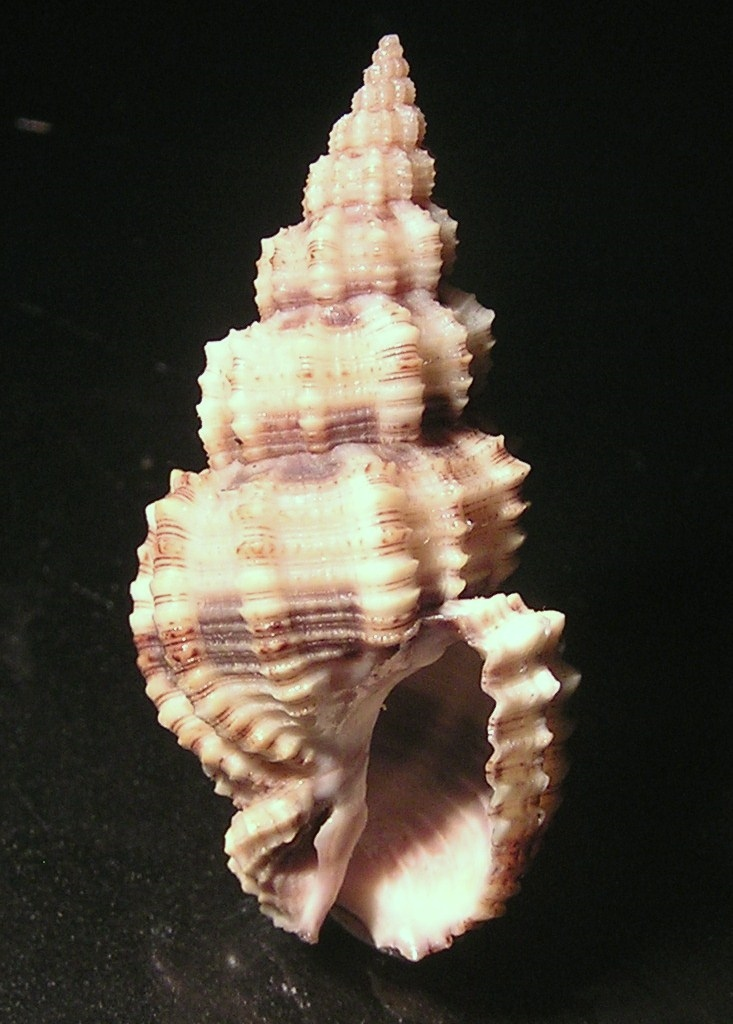
- Shell of a Phos nassa mud snail
  Phos
  - †Phos iterandum
  - †Phos lucrifactum – tentative report
  - †Phos mangonizatum
  - †Phos sagenum
  - †Phos texanum
- Phyllodus
- Physodon
  - †Physodon secundus
- Physoida
  - †Physoida clarkeana
- Pica
  - †Pica pica
- Picoides
  - †Picoides villosus – or unidentified comparable form
- Pinna
- Pipistrellus
- Piranga
  - †Piranga olivacea – or unidentified comparable form
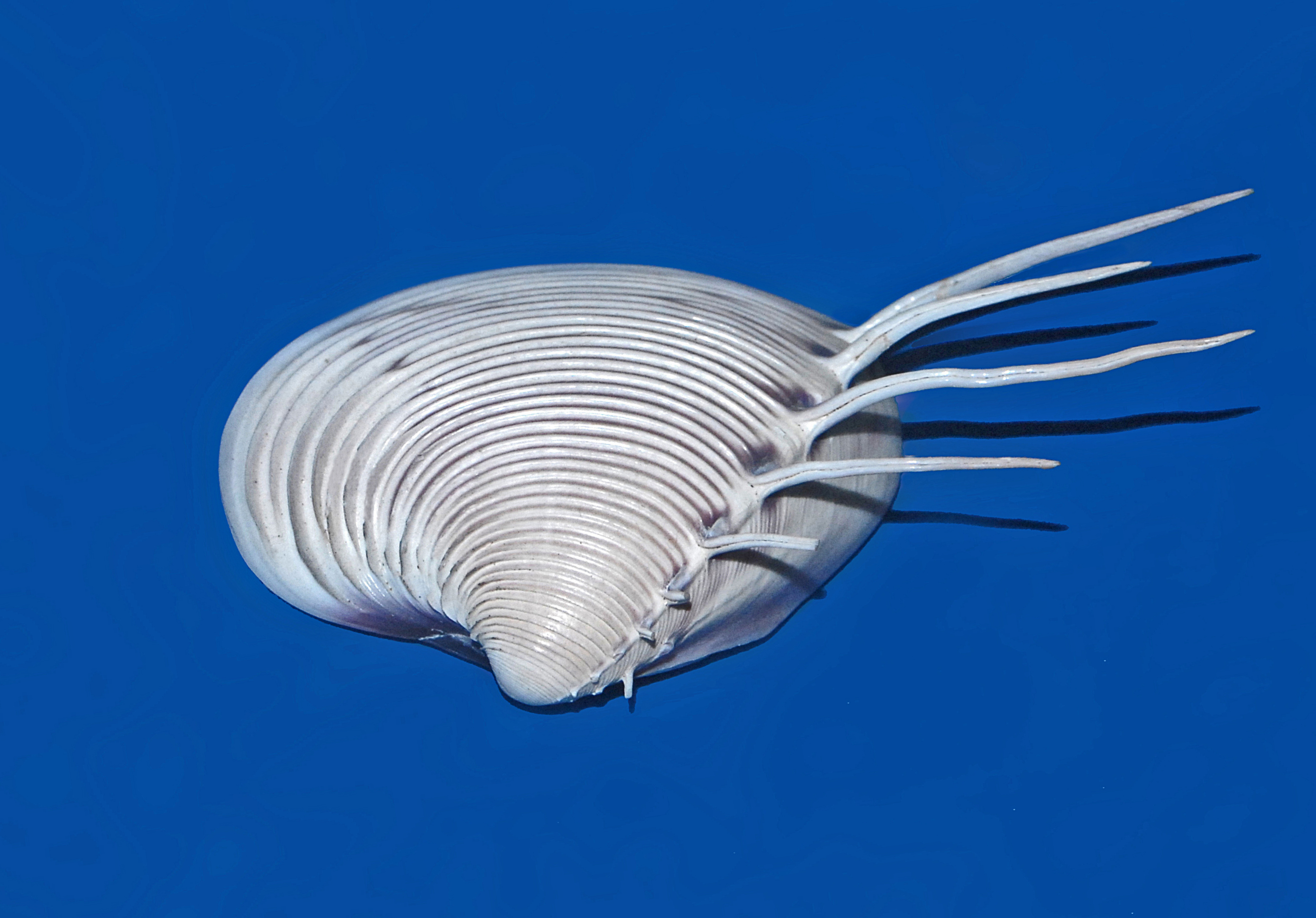
- Shell of a Pitar venus clam
  Pitar
  - †Pitar cornelli
  - †Pitar exiguus
  - †Pitar juliae
  - †Pitar macbeani
  - †Pitar nuttali
  - †Pitar nuttalliopsis
  - †Pitar petropolitanus
  - †Pitar poulsoni
  - †Pitar ripleyanus
  - †Pitar securiformis
  - †Pitar texibrazus
  - †Pitar trigoniata
- †Plagiarca
  - †Plagiarca rhomboidella
- Plagiobrissus
  - †Plagiobrissus dixie
- Plagioecia
  - †Plagioecia birta – type locality for species
  - †Plagioecia divagans – type locality for species
  - †Plagioecia tubifer – type locality for species
- †Plagiosmittia
  - †Plagiosmittia regularis
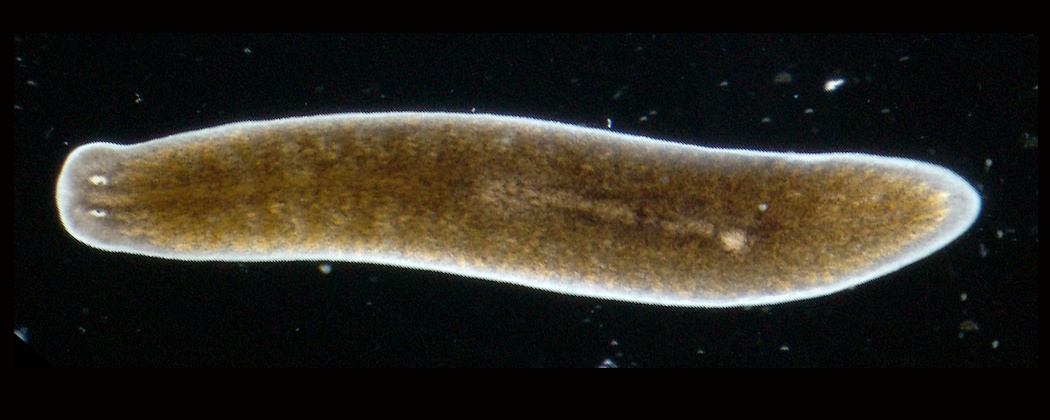
- A living Planaria
  †Planaria – report made of unidentified related form or using admittedly obsolete nomenclature
  - †Planaria nitens
- Planorbis – or unidentified comparable form
- †Platyoptera
  - †Platyoptera extenta
- Platytrochus
  - †Platytrochus claibornensis
  - †Platytrochus goldfussi
  - †Platytrochus stokesi
- †Pleiolama
  - †Pleiolama vera – or unidentified comparable form
- Plethodon
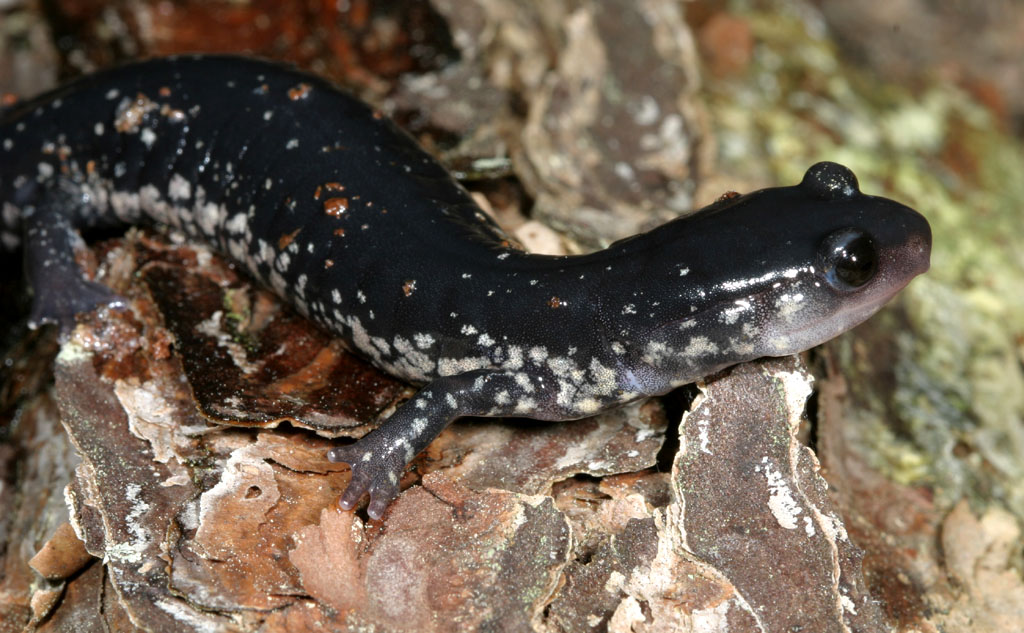
  - A living Plethodon glutinosus, or northern slimy salamander
    †Plethodon glutinosus
- Pleurofusia
  - †Pleurofusia claibarena
  - †Pleurofusia collaris
  - †Pleurofusia huppertzi
- †Pleuroliria
  - †Pleuroliria subdeviata
  - †Pleuroliria supramirifica
  - †Pleuroliria tizis
- Pleuromeris
  - †Pleuromeris inflatior
  - †Pleuromeris parva
  - †Pleuromeris tortidens
- †Pleuronea
  - †Pleuronea alveolata
  - †Pleuronea elevata
  - †Pleuronea fenestrata
  - †Pleuronea fibrosa
  - †Pleuronea fusiformis
- †Pleurostoma
  - †Pleurostoma adolescens
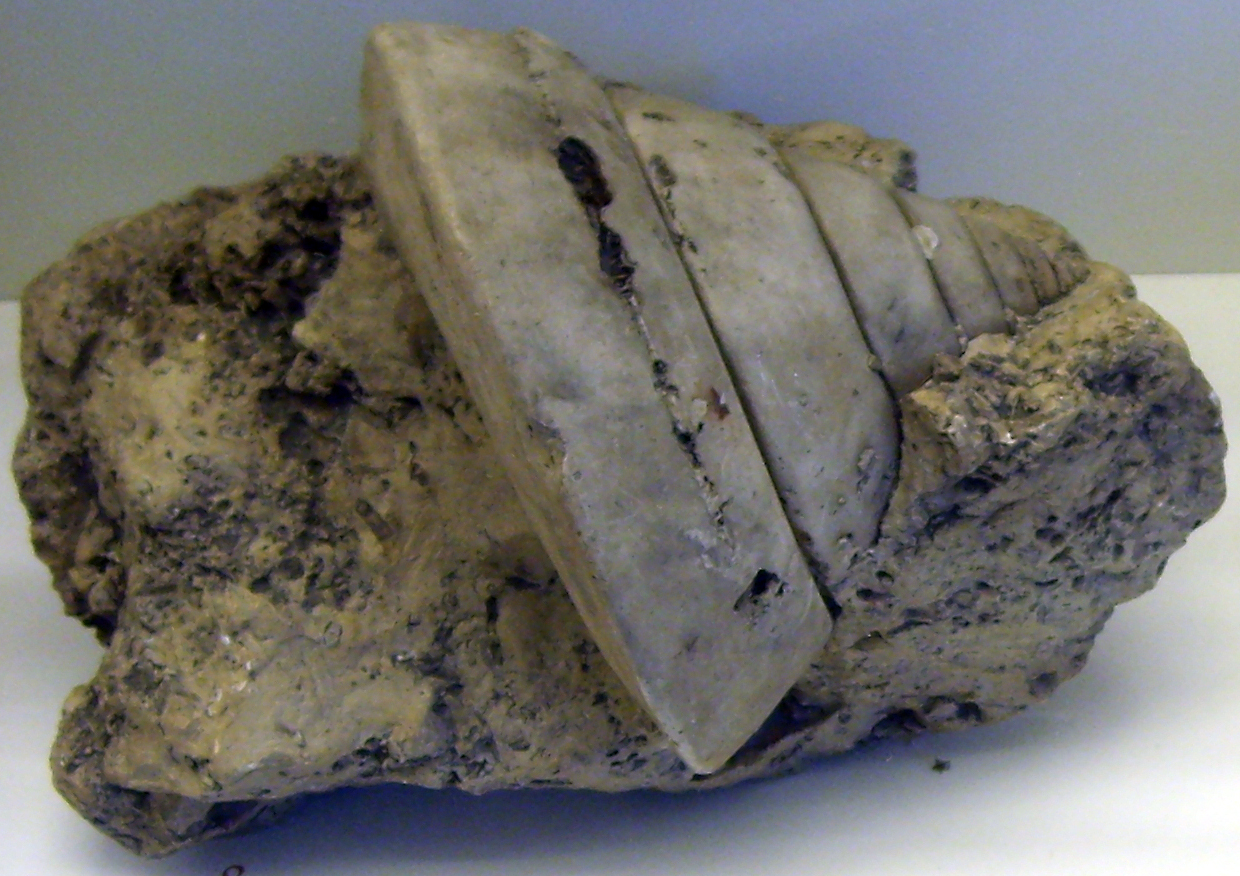
- Fossilized shell of a Pleurotomaria slit snail
  Pleurotomaria – report made of unidentified related form or using admittedly obsolete nomenclature
- Pleurotomella
  - †Pleurotomella whitfieldi
- †Plevrofusia – tentative report
  - †Plevrofusia huppertzi
- Plicatula
  - †Plicatula filamentosa
- Podilymbus
  - †Podilymbus podiceps
- Poirieria
  - †Poirieria harrisi
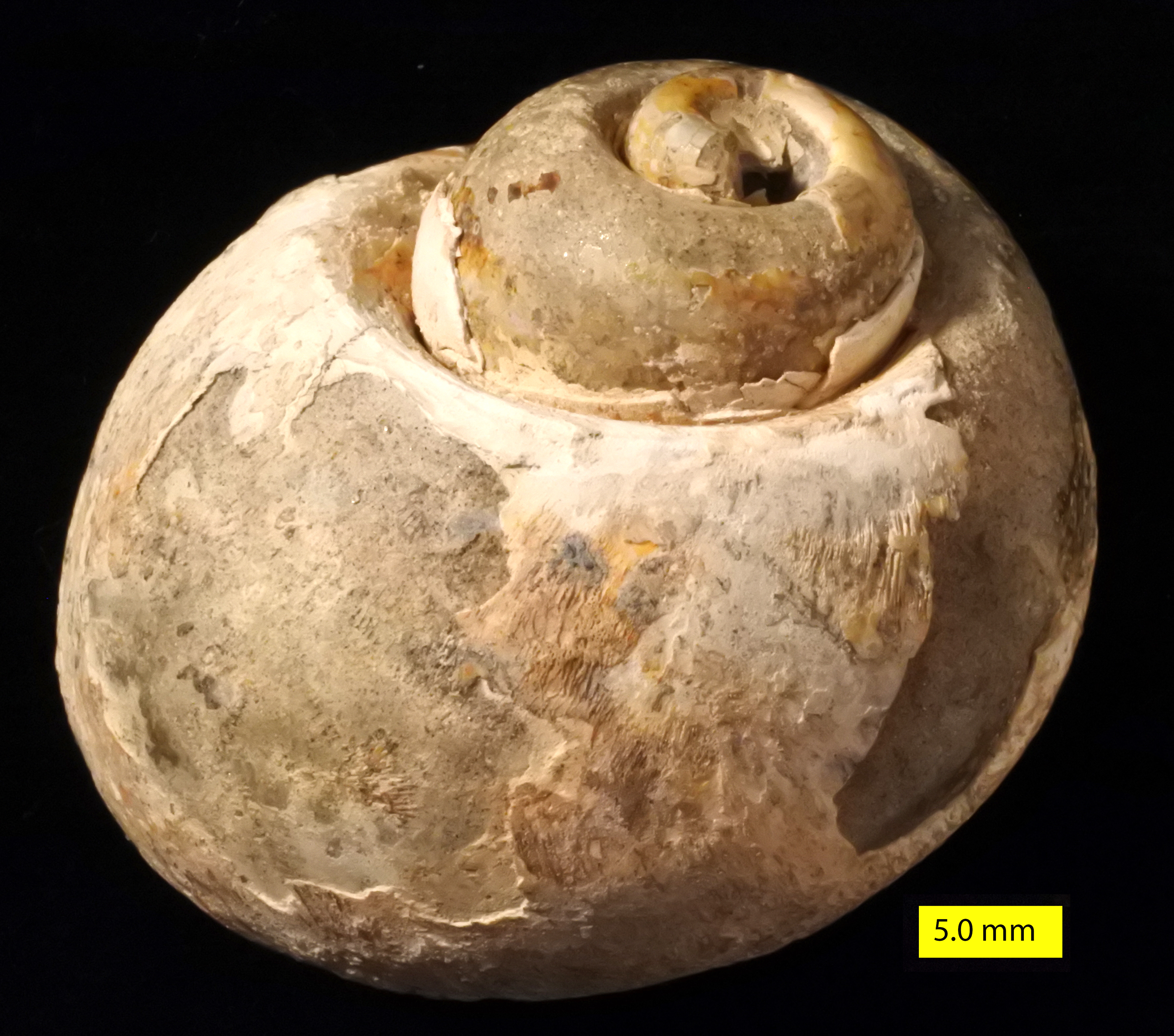
- Fossilized shell of the Paleocene-modern moon snail Polinices
  Polinices
  - †Polinices aratus
  - †Polinices eminulus
  - †Polinices onustus
  - †Polinices weisbordi
- Polyschides
  - †Polyschides turritus
- Pomatodelphis
  - †Pomatodelphis inaequalis
- †Pontogeneus
  - †Pontogeneus brachyspondylus
- Porella
  - †Porella crassoparies – type locality for species
  - †Porella crassoparites
  - †Porella cylindrica – type locality for species
  - †Porella erecta – type locality for species
- Porina
  - †Porina saillans – type locality for species
- †Potamides – report made of unidentified related form or using admittedly obsolete nomenclature
  - †Potamides fulvarupis
- †Priscoficus
  - †Priscoficus juvenis
  - †Priscoficus triserialis
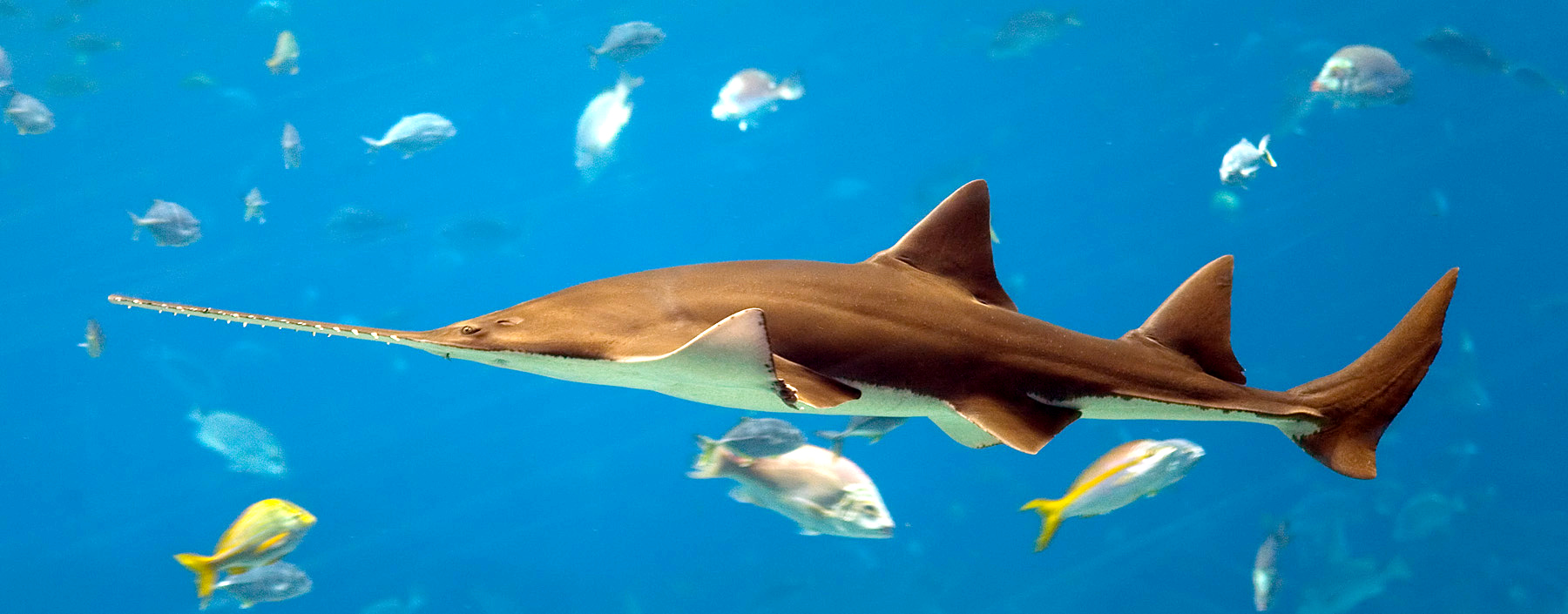
- A living Pristis sawfish
  Pristis
  - †Pristis lathami
- Proboscina
  - †Proboscina clavatiramosa
  - †Proboscina conveniens – type locality for species
  - †Proboscina cranei – type locality for species
  - †Proboscina latabrevis – type locality for species
  - †Proboscina subechinata
- Propeamussium
  - †Propeamussium alabamense
  - †Propeamussium squamulum – or unidentified comparable form
- †Prosthennops
  - †Prosthennops serus – or unidentified comparable form
- †Protocardia
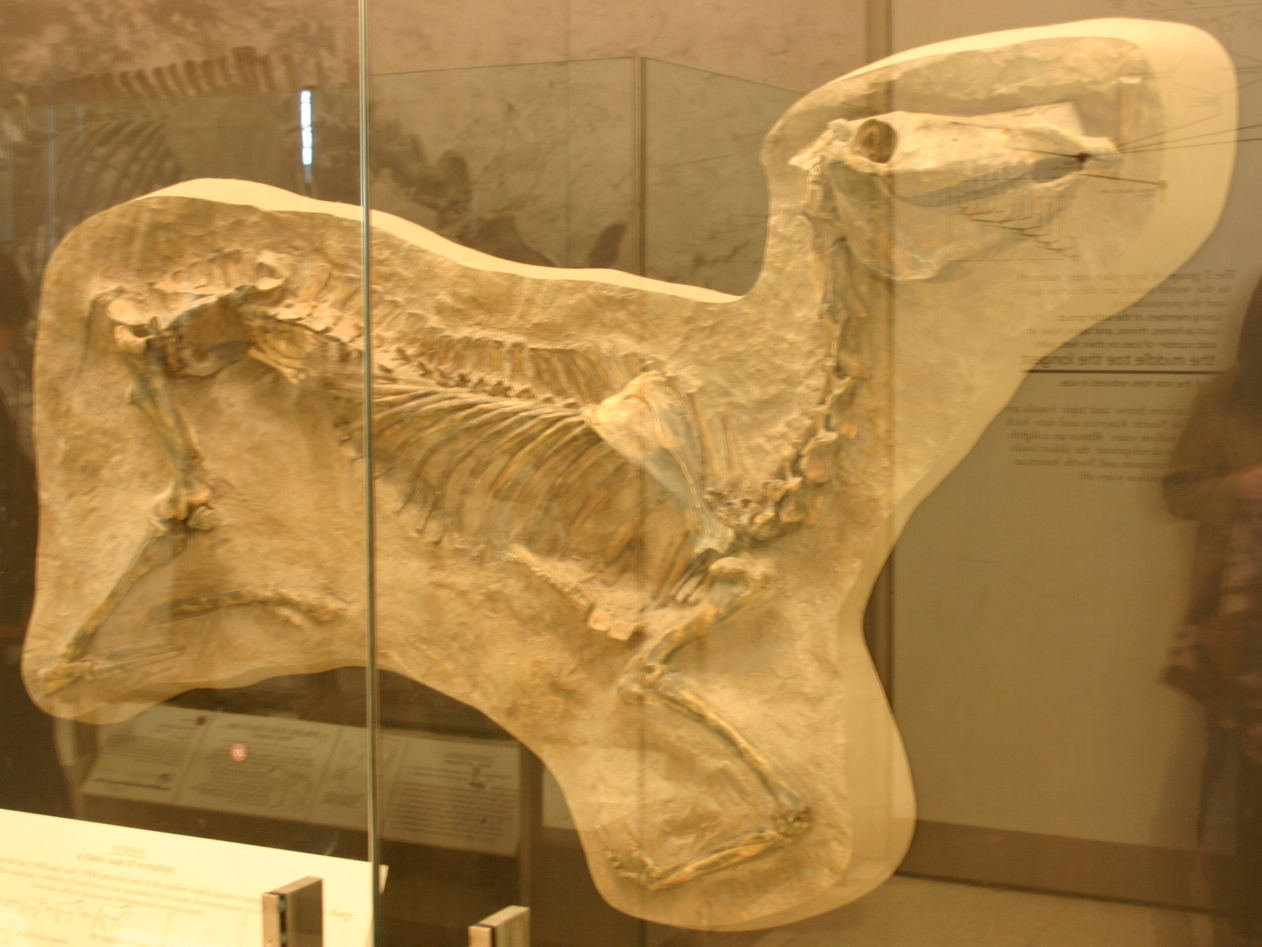
- Fossilized skeleton of the Miocene horse Protohippus
  †Protohippus
  - †Protohippus gidleyi
- †Protoscutella
  - †Protoscutella mississipiensis
  - †Protoscutella mississippiensis
- †Protosurcula
  - †Protosurcula gabbii
- Prunum
  - †Prunum columba
- Pseudemys
  - †Pseudemys cocinna
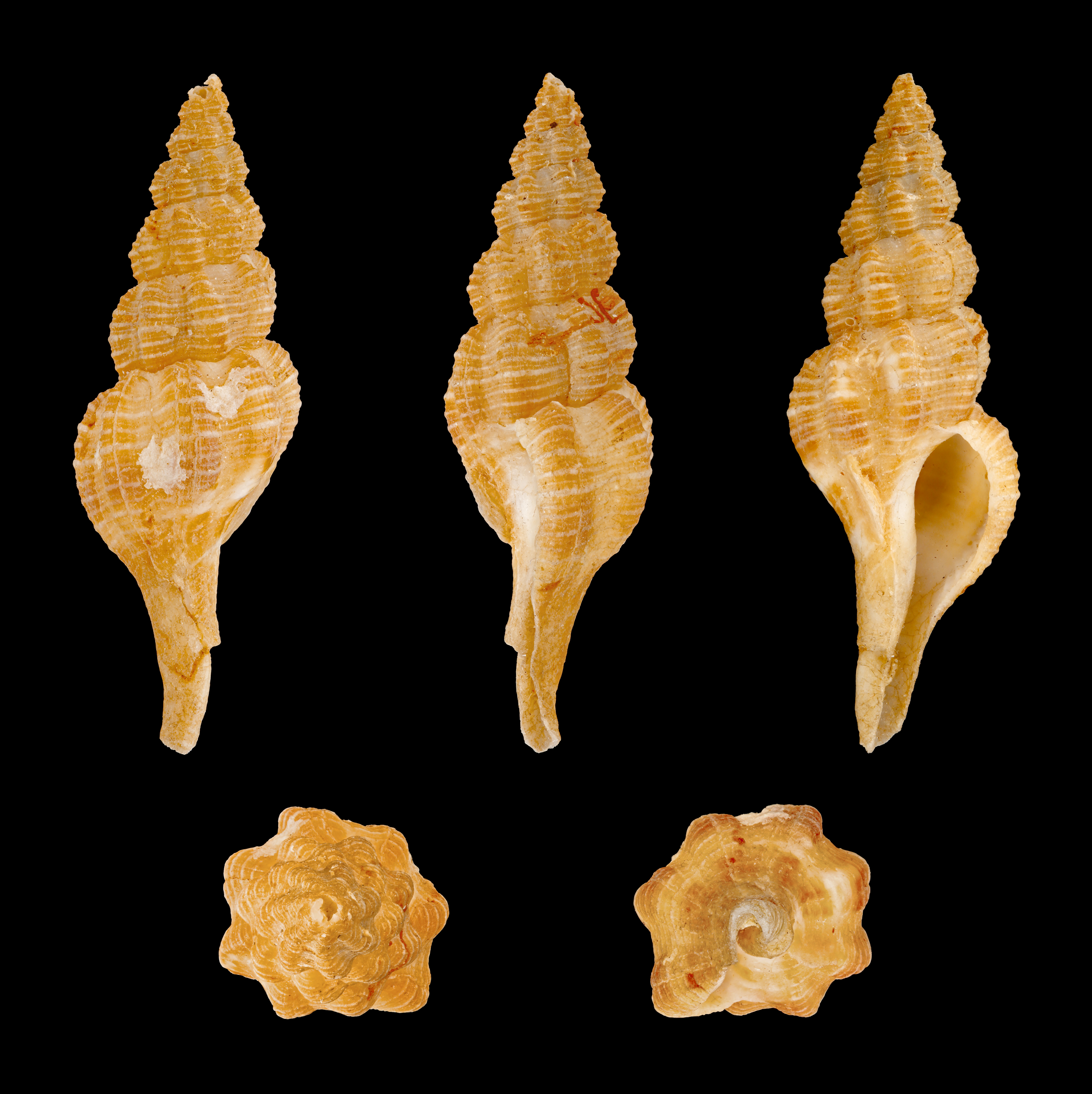
- Shell in multiple views of a Pseudolatirus spindle sea snail
  †Pseudolatirus
  - †Pseudolatirus tortilis
- Pseudoliva
  - †Pseudoliva forma
  - †Pseudoliva nanafaliaensis
  - †Pseudoliva perspectiva
  - †Pseudoliva santander
  - †Pseudoliva scalina
  - †Pseudoliva tuberculifera
  - †Pseudoliva unicarinata
  - †Pseudoliva vetusta
- Pseudomalaxis
  - †Pseudomalaxis rotella
  - †Pseudomalaxis tipa
  - †Pseudomalaxis verrilli
- Pseudoneptunea – or unidentified comparable form
  - †Pseudoneptunea harrisi
- †Pseudophragmina
  - †Pseudophragmina stephensoni
- Pteria
  - †Pteria limula
  - †Pteria vanwinkleae
- †Pteropsella
  - †Pteropsella lapidosa
  - †Pteropsella papyria
  - †Pteropsella praelapidosa
- †Pterosphenus – type locality for genus
  - †Pterosphenus schucherti – type locality for species
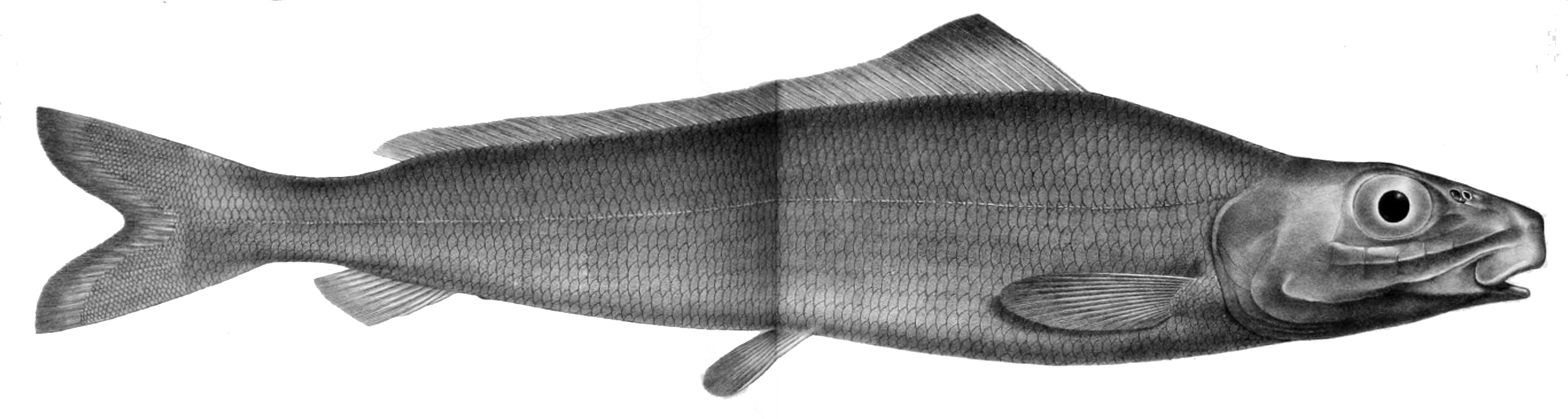
- Illustration of a living Pterothrissus gissu, or Japanese gissu
  Pterothrissus
- Pterynotus
  - †Pterynotus matthewsensis
- Puellina
  - †Puellina inarmata
  - †Puellina radiata
  - †Puellina simulator
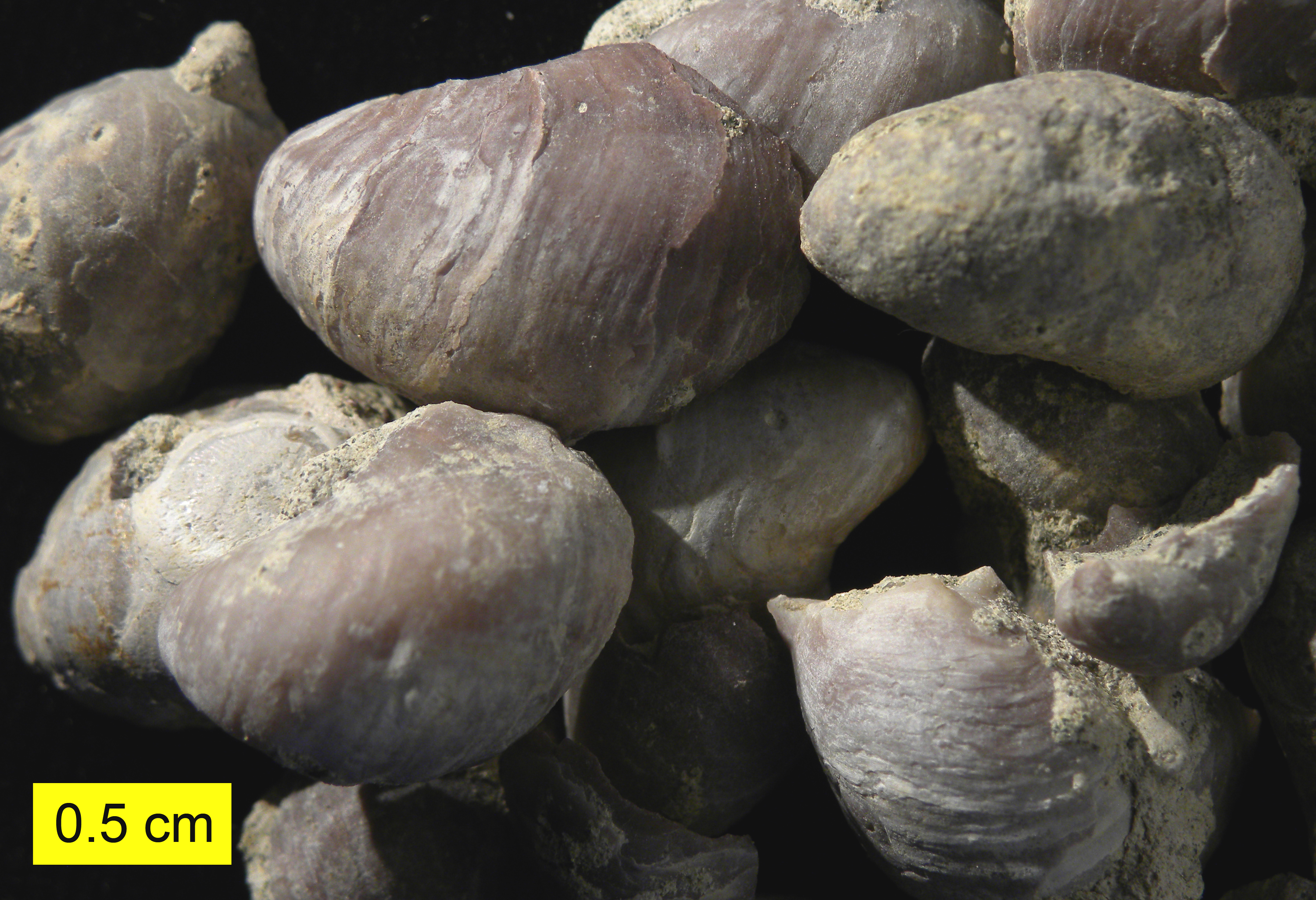
- Assemblage of fossilized shells of the Cretaceous-Pleistocene oyster Pycnodonte
  Pycnodonte
  - †Pycnodonte johnsoni
  - †Pycnodonte pulaskensis – or unidentified related form
  - †Pycnodonte sylvaerupis
  - †Pycnodonte trigonalis
  - †Pycnodonte vicksburgensis
- Pyramidella
  - †Pyramidella anita
  - †Pyramidella bastropensis
  - †Pyramidella chavani
  - †Pyramidella cossmanni
  - †Pyramidella dalli
  - †Pyramidella mitchelliana
  - †Pyramidella obtusoides
  - †Pyramidella perexilis
  - †Pyramidella propeacicula
  - †Pyramidella pseudopymaea
- †Pyramimitra
  - †Pyramimitra olssoni
  - †Pyramimitra terebraeformis
- †Pyrgulina
  - †Pyrgulina claibornensis

== Q ==
- Quinqueloculina
  - †Quinqueloculina hauerina – tentative report
  - †Quinqueloculina jacksonensis
- Quiscalus
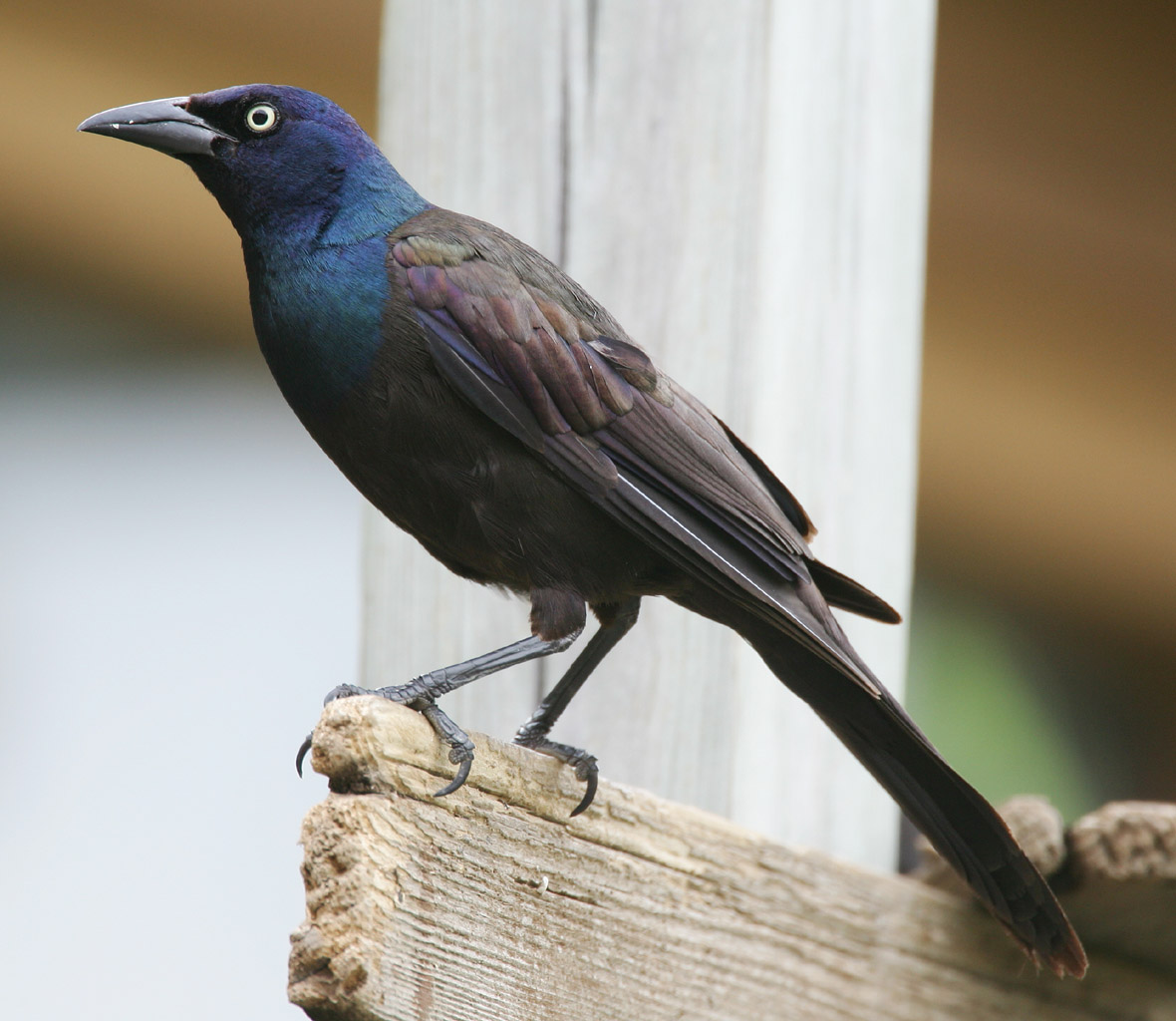
  - A living Quiscalus quiscula, or common grackle
    †Quiscalus quiscula

== R ==
- Raja
- †Rana
  - †Rana catesbeiana
  - †Rana pipiens
- †Ranellina
  - †Ranellina sulcata
- Rangifer
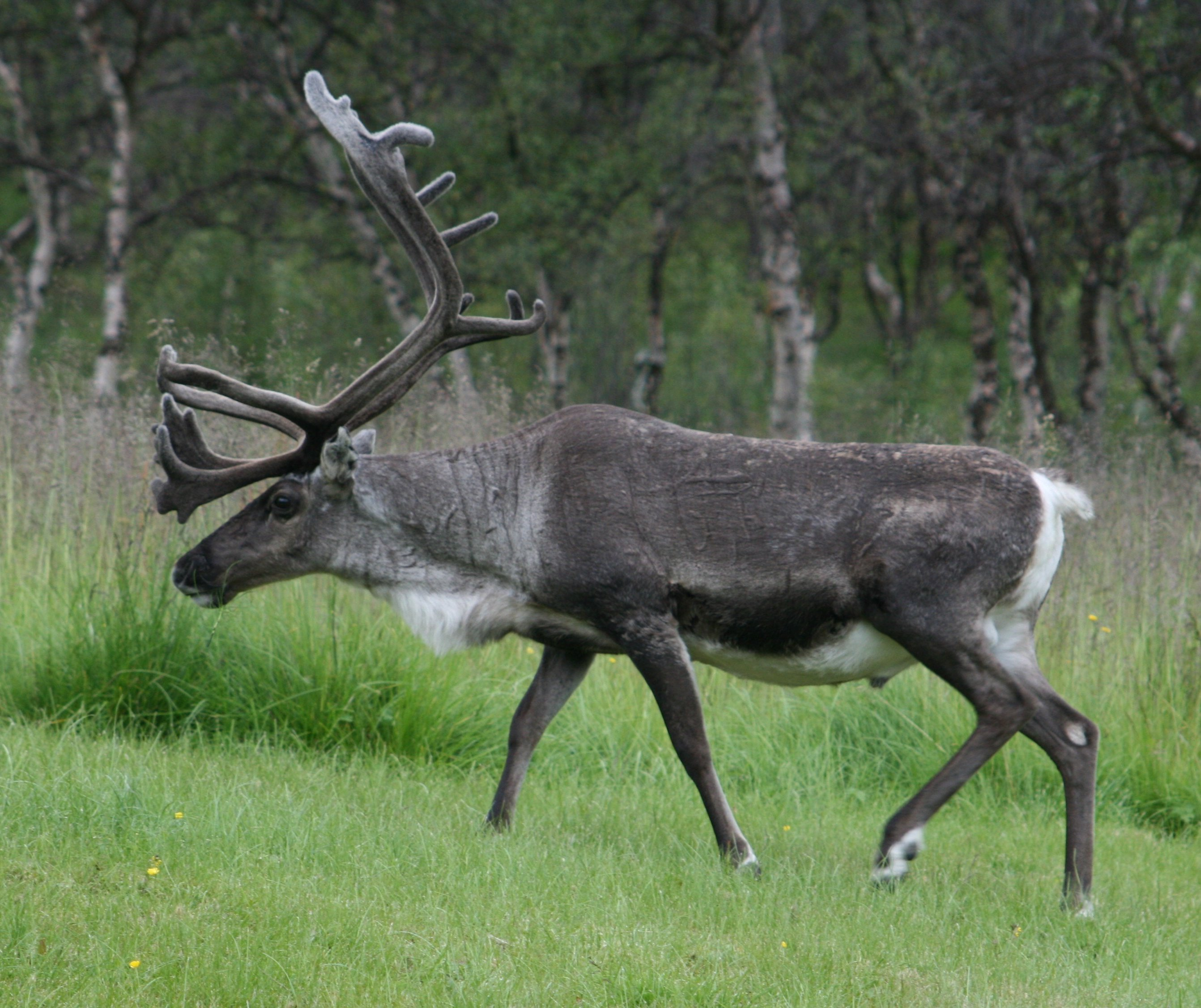
  - A living Rangifer tarandus, or reindeer
    †Rangifer tarandus
- Raphitoma
  - †Raphitoma georgei
  - †Raphitoma pannekoekae
  - †Raphitoma specus
  - †Raphitoma veatchi
  - †Raphitoma venusta
- †Rectonychocella
  - †Rectonychocella tenuis – type locality for species
- †Recurvella
  - †Recurvella dolabra
- Reithrodontomys
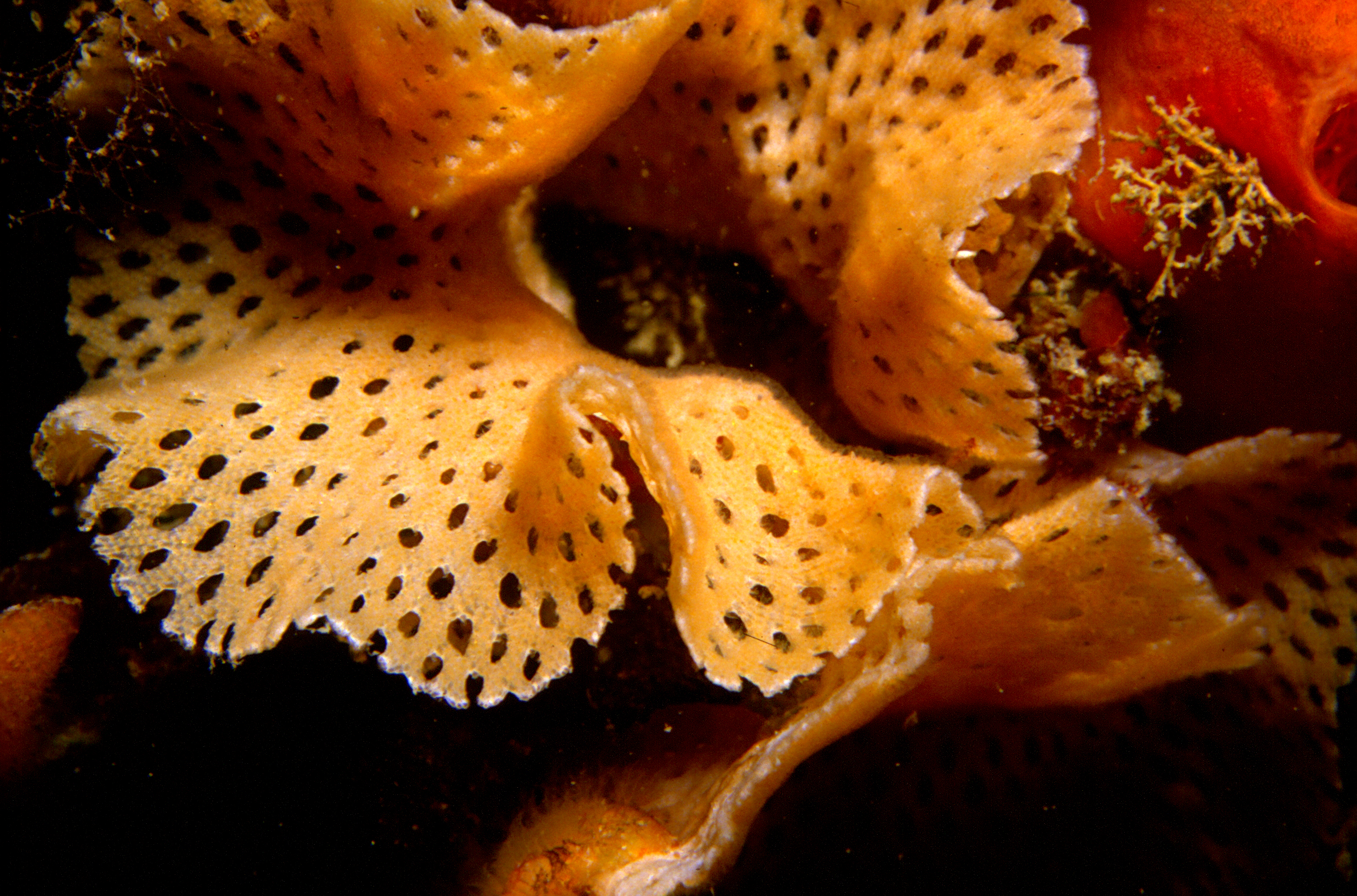
- Living Reteporella bryozoan ("moss animal")
  Reteporella
  - †Reteporella laciniosa
  - †Reteporella lacintosa – type locality for species
- Retusa
  - †Retusa galba
  - †Retusa sylvaerupis
- †Rhabdopitaria
  - †Rhabdopitaria discoidalis
  - †Rhabdopitaria subcrassa
- †Rhagasostoma
  - †Rhagasostoma levigata – type locality for species
- Rhamphostomella
  - †Rhamphostomella simplex – type locality for species
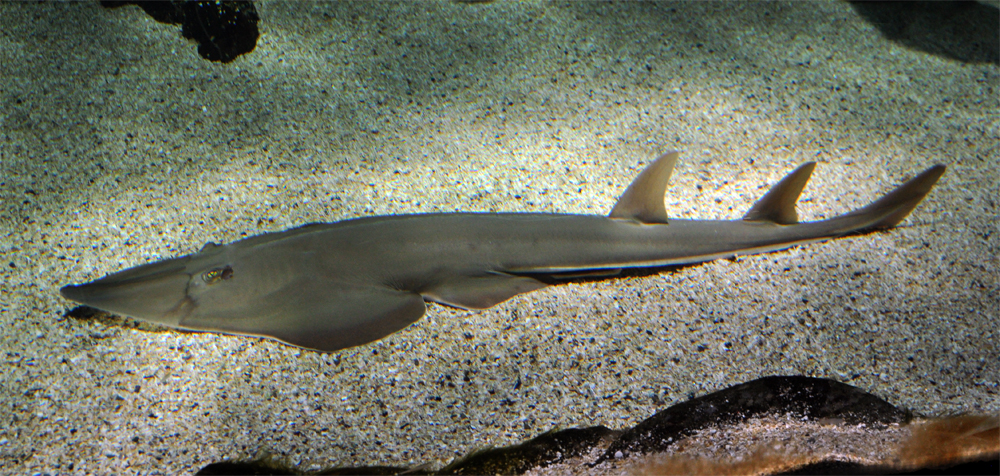
- A living Rhinobatos guitar fish
  Rhinobatos
- Rhinoclavis
  - †Rhinoclavis mediavia
- Rhinoptera
- Rhizoprionodon
- Rhizorus
  - †Rhizorus conradianus
  - †Rhizorus subradius
  - †Rhizorus volutatus
- †Rhopostoma
  - †Rhopostoma creniferum
  - †Rhopostoma cruciferum
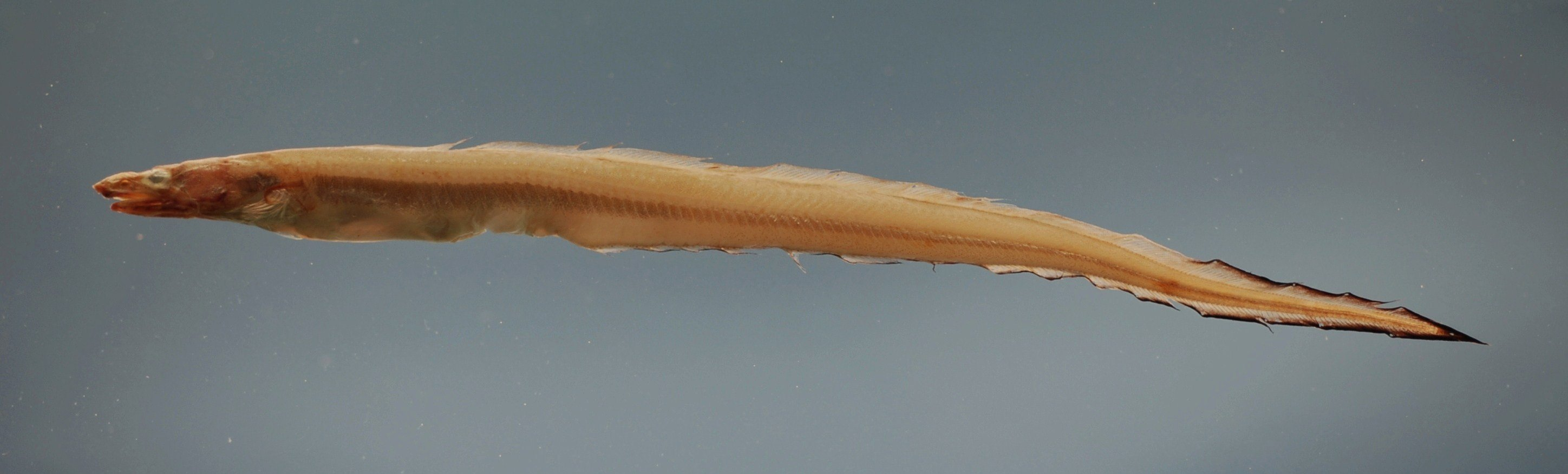
- A living Rhynchoconger conger eel
  Rhynchoconger
  - †Rhynchoconger sanctus
- †Rhytisoria
  - †Rhytisoria alabamensis
- Rimella
  - †Rimella laqueatus
- †Ringicardium
  - †Ringicardium harrisi
- Ringicula
  - †Ringicula alabamensis
  - †Ringicula biplicata
  - †Ringicula butleriana
  - †Ringicula claibornensis
  - †Ringicula lisbonensis
  - †Ringicula trapaquara
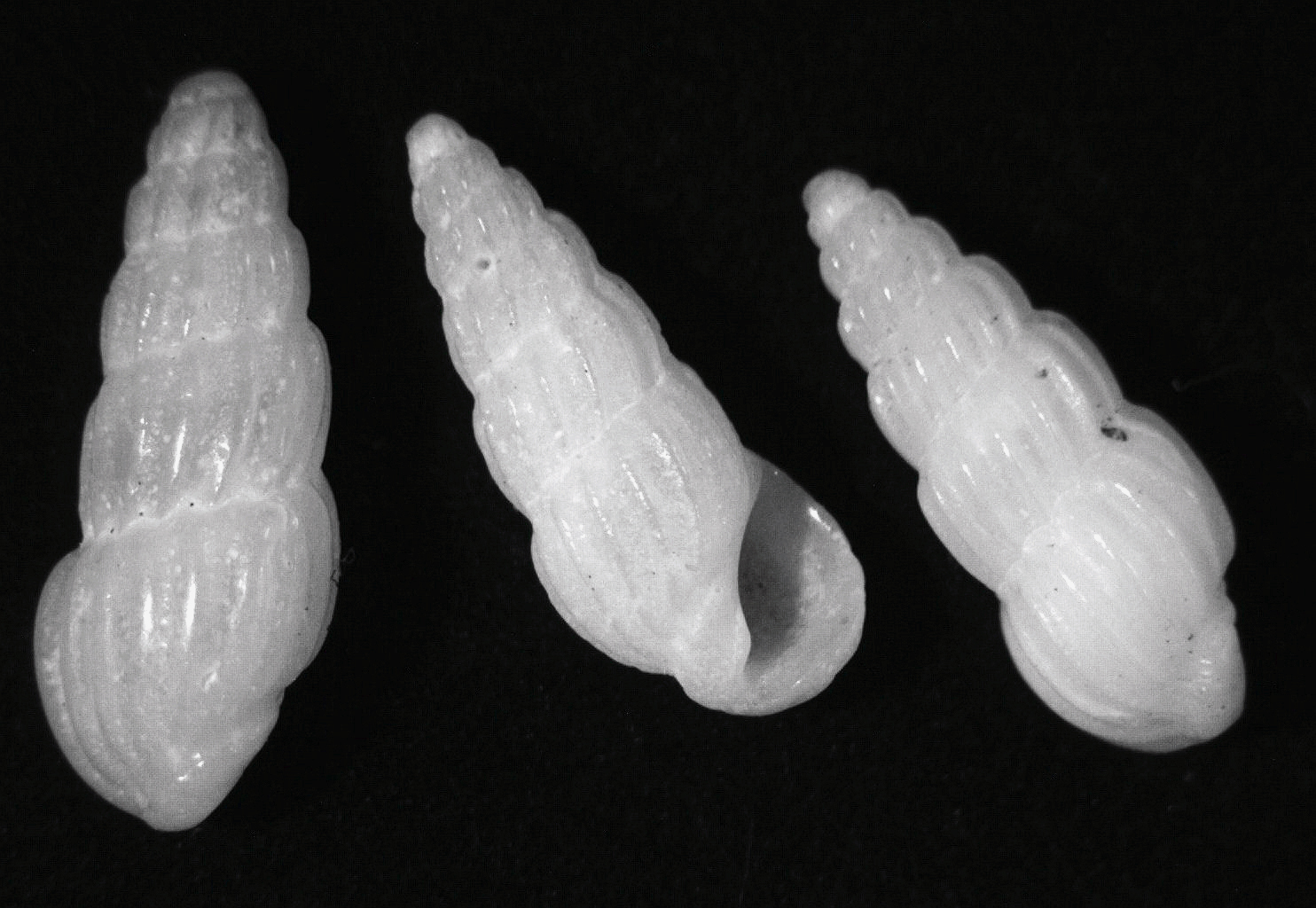
- Fossilized shells of the sea snail Rissoina
  Rissoina
  - †Rissoina alabamenesis – tentative report
  - †Rissoina alabamensis
  - †Rissoina cossmanni
- †Rogueus
  - †Rogueus johnsoni
- Rosseliana
  - †Rosseliana parvipora
- Rostellaria
  - †Rostellaria decisus
  - †Rostellaria explicatus
  - †Rostellaria mohri
  - †Rostellaria ottonis
  - †Rostellaria proscissus
  - †Rostellaria quercollis
  - †Rostellaria rannelloides
  - †Rostellaria symmetricus
- †Rotularia
  - †Rotularia mcglameryae
  - †Rotularia mcglemeryae
- †Rudiscala
  - †Rudiscala harrisi
  - †Rudiscala sessilis

== S ==
- †Sablea – tentative report
- Saccella
  - †Saccella catasarca
  - †Saccella parva
  - †Saccella quercollis
  - †Saccella robusta
- Salenia – tentative report
- Sassia
  - †Sassia septemdentata
- Saxicavella
  - †Saxicavella alabamensis
- †Saxolucina
  - †Saxolucina claibornensis
  - †Saxolucina gaufia
- Sayornis
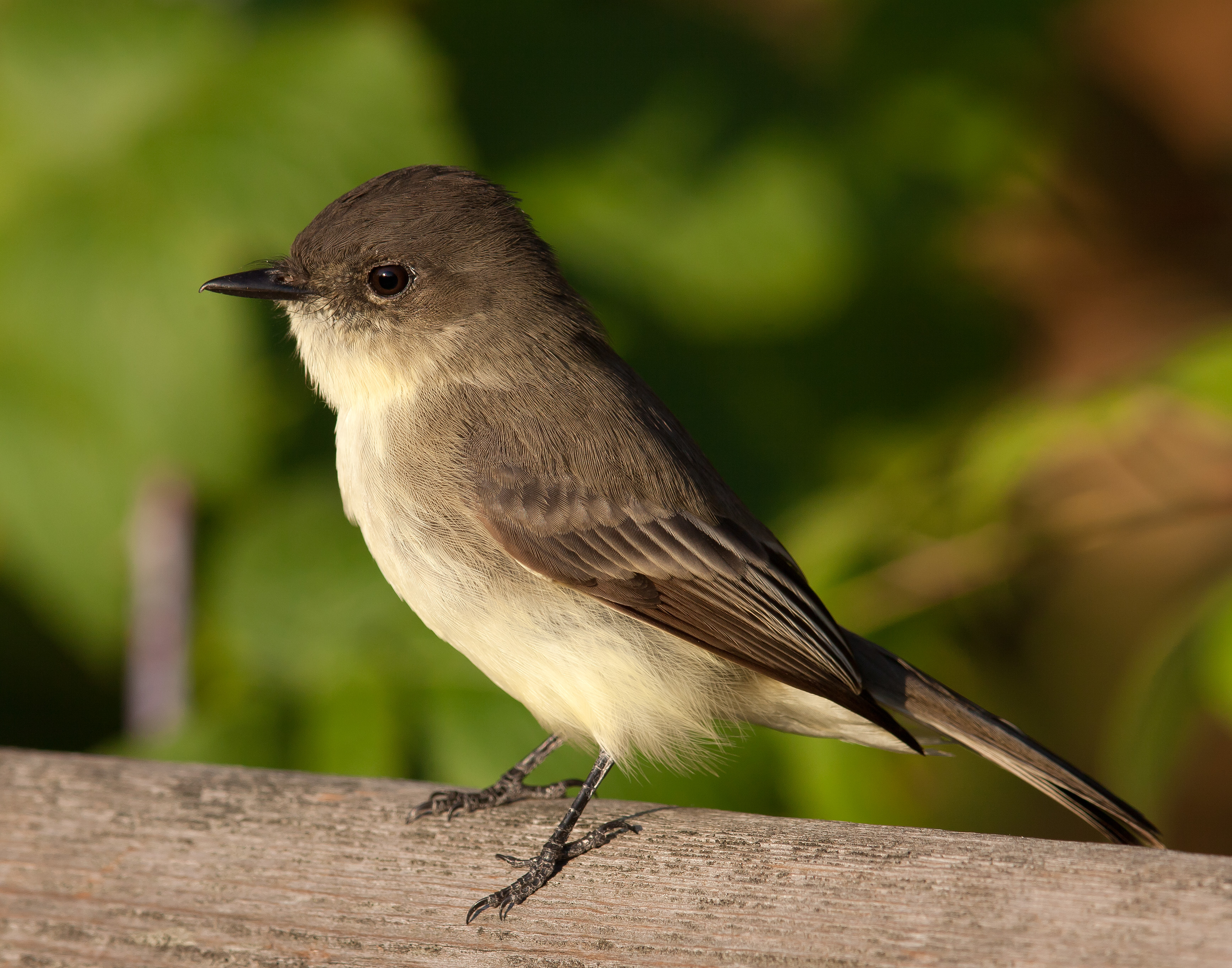
  - A living Sayornis phoebe, or eastern phoebe
    †Sayornis phoebe – or unidentified comparable form
- Scalaria – report made of unidentified related form or using admittedly obsolete nomenclature
  - †Scalaria quinquefasciata
- Scalina
  - †Scalina staminea
  - †Scalina trapaquara
- Scaphander
  - †Scaphander alabamensis
  - †Scaphander ligniticus
- Scaphella
  - †Scaphella newcombiana
  - †Scaphella showalteri
- †Sceptrum
  - †Sceptrum perulum
- †Schedocardia
  - †Schedocardia hatchetigbeensis
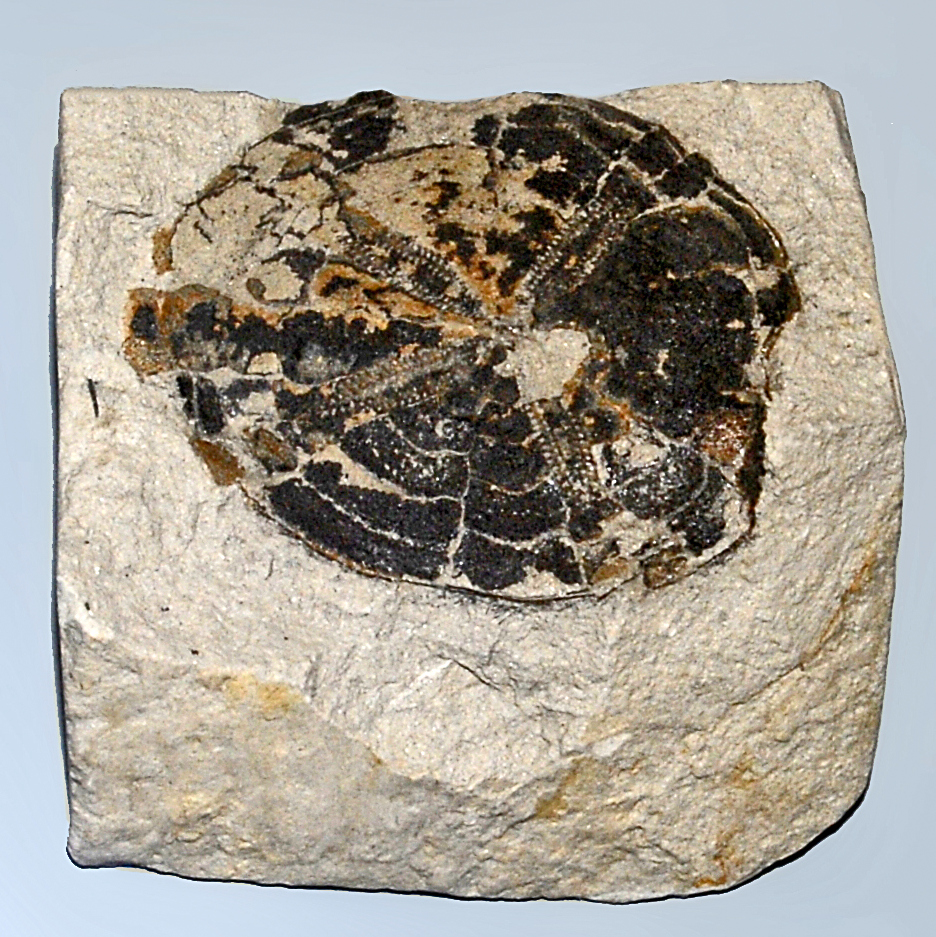
- Fossil of the Paleocene-recent heart urchin Schizaster
  Schizaster
  - †Schizaster americanus
  - †Schizaster armiger
- †Schizemiella
  - †Schizemiella claibornica
- Schizomavella
  - †Schizomavella arborea – type locality for species
  - †Schizomavella porosa
- Schizoporella
  - †Schizoporella viminea
- †Schizorthosecos
  - †Schizorthosecos grandiporosum – type locality for species
  - †Schizorthosecos interstitia
  - †Schizorthosecos radiatum
- †Scintilla
  - †Scintilla alabamiensis
  - †Scintilla clarkeana
- Scobinella
  - †Scobinella elaborata
  - †Scobinella hammettensis
  - †Scobinella reticulatoides
  - †Scobinella sativa
  - †Scobinella sculpturata
- Scolopax
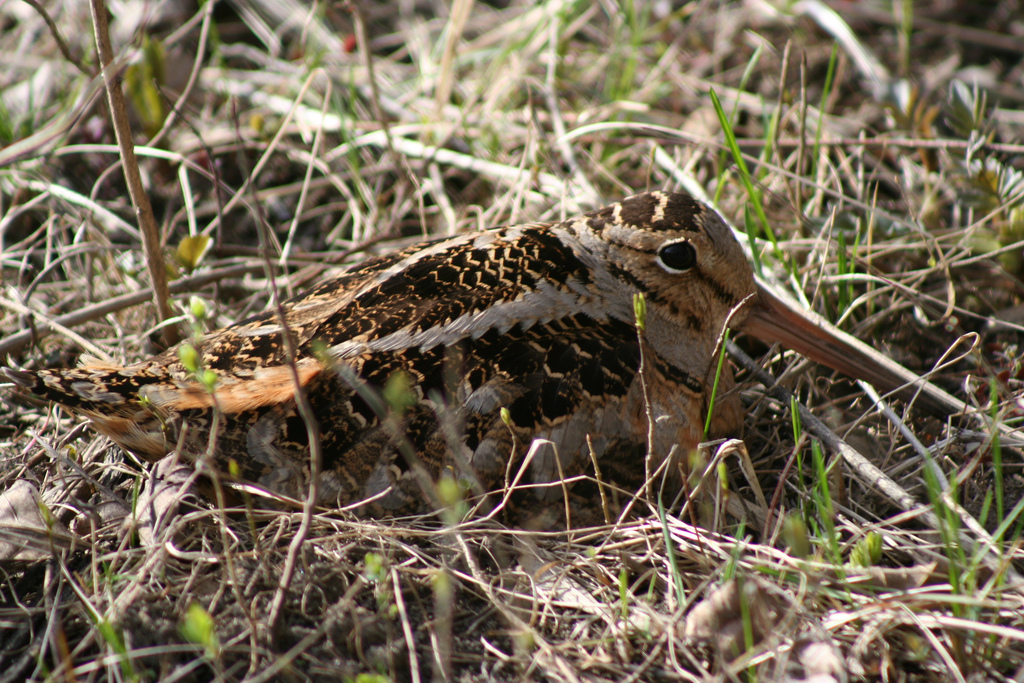
  - A living Scolopax minor, or American woodcock
    †Scolopax minor
- Scrupocellaria
  - †Scrupocellaria clausa
  - †Scrupocellaria cookei
  - †Scrupocellaria milneri
  - †Scrupocellaria rathbuni – type locality for species
  - †Scrupocellaria resneri – type locality for species
  - †Scrupocellaria triangulata – type locality for species
  - †Scrupocellaria vaughani – type locality for species
  - †Scrupocellaria williardi
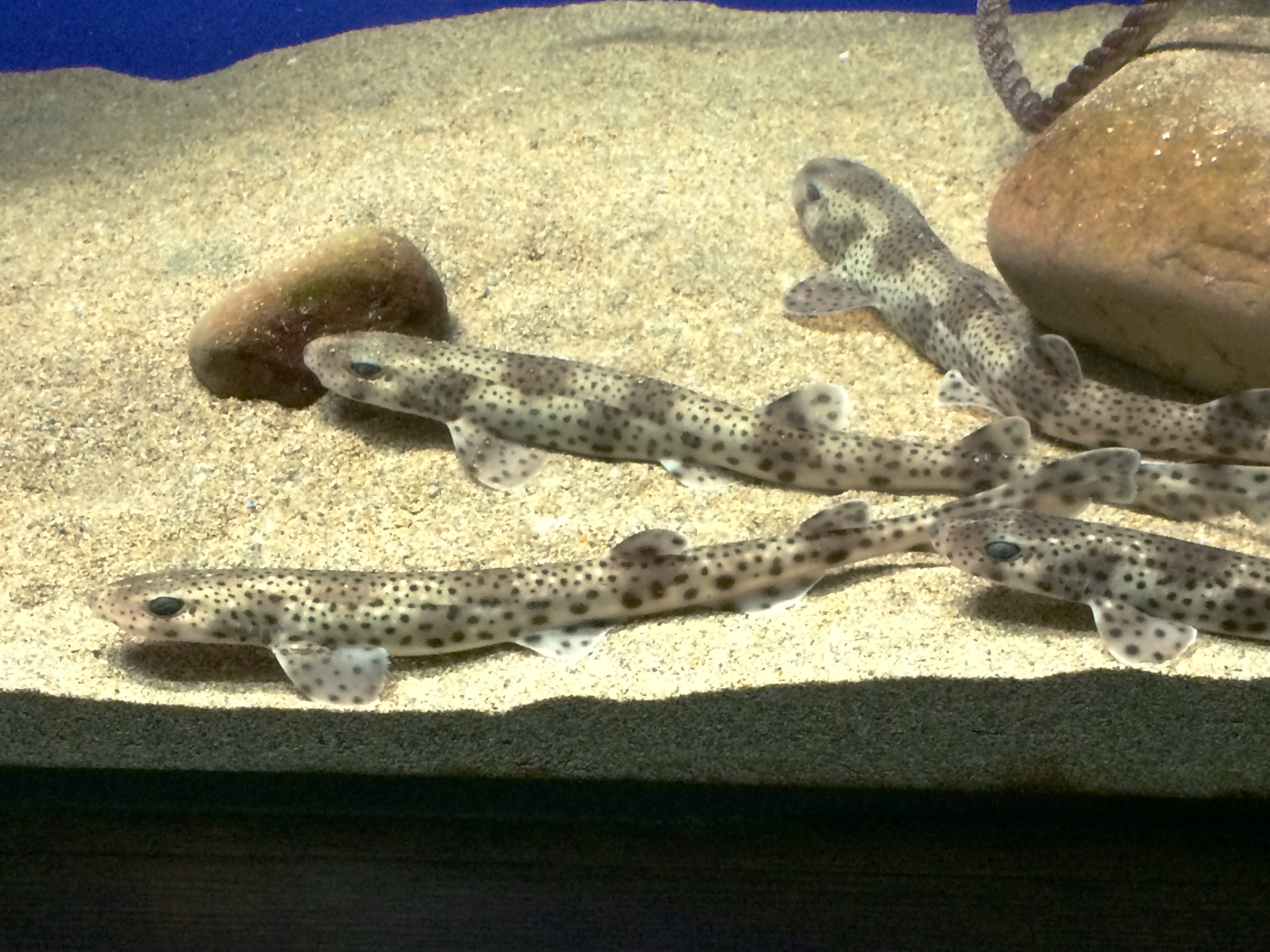
- Group of living Scyliorhinus catsharks
  Scyliorhinus
  - †Scyliorhinus enniskilleni – type locality for species
- Seila
  - †Seila constricta
- Semele
  - †Semele langdoniana
  - †Semele linosa
  - †Semele monroensis
  - †Semele profunda
- Semihaswellia
  - †Semihaswellia exilis – type locality for species
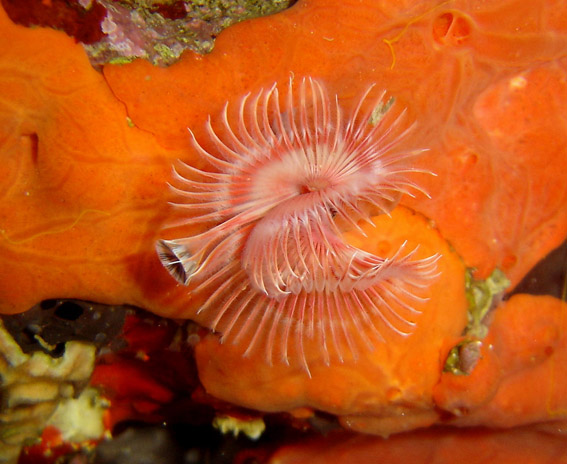
- A living Serpula, or calcareous tubeworm
  Serpula
  - †Serpula adnata – tentative report
- Serpulorbis
  - †Serpulorbis major
  - †Serpulorbis squamulosus
- Siderastrea
  - †Siderastrea conferta – type locality for species
- †Sideroseris
  - †Sideroseris durhami
- Sigatica
  - †Sigatica boettgeri
  - †Sigatica clarkeana
- Sigmomorphina – tentative report
  - †Sigmomorphina inequalis
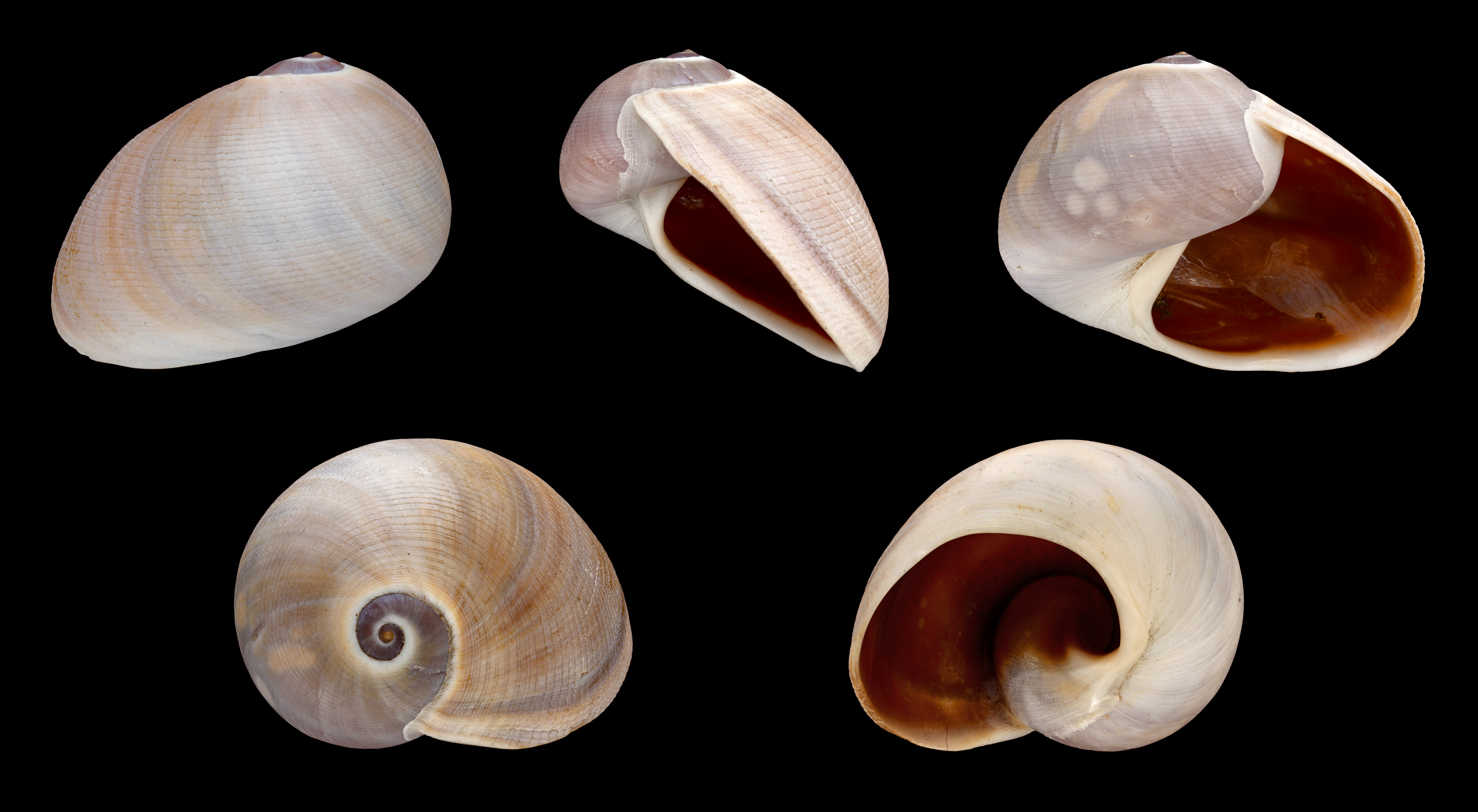
- Several views of the shell of a Sinum moon snail
  Sinum
  - †Sinum arctatum
  - †Sinum beatricae
  - †Sinum bilix
  - †Sinum declive
  - †Sinum fiski
  - †Sinum inconstans
- Siphonalia
  - †Siphonalia newtonensis
  - †Siphonalia perlata
  - †Siphonalia quadrilineata
- Siphonochelus
  - †Siphonochelus gracilis
- Skena
  - †Skena pignus
- Skenea
  - †Skenea pignus
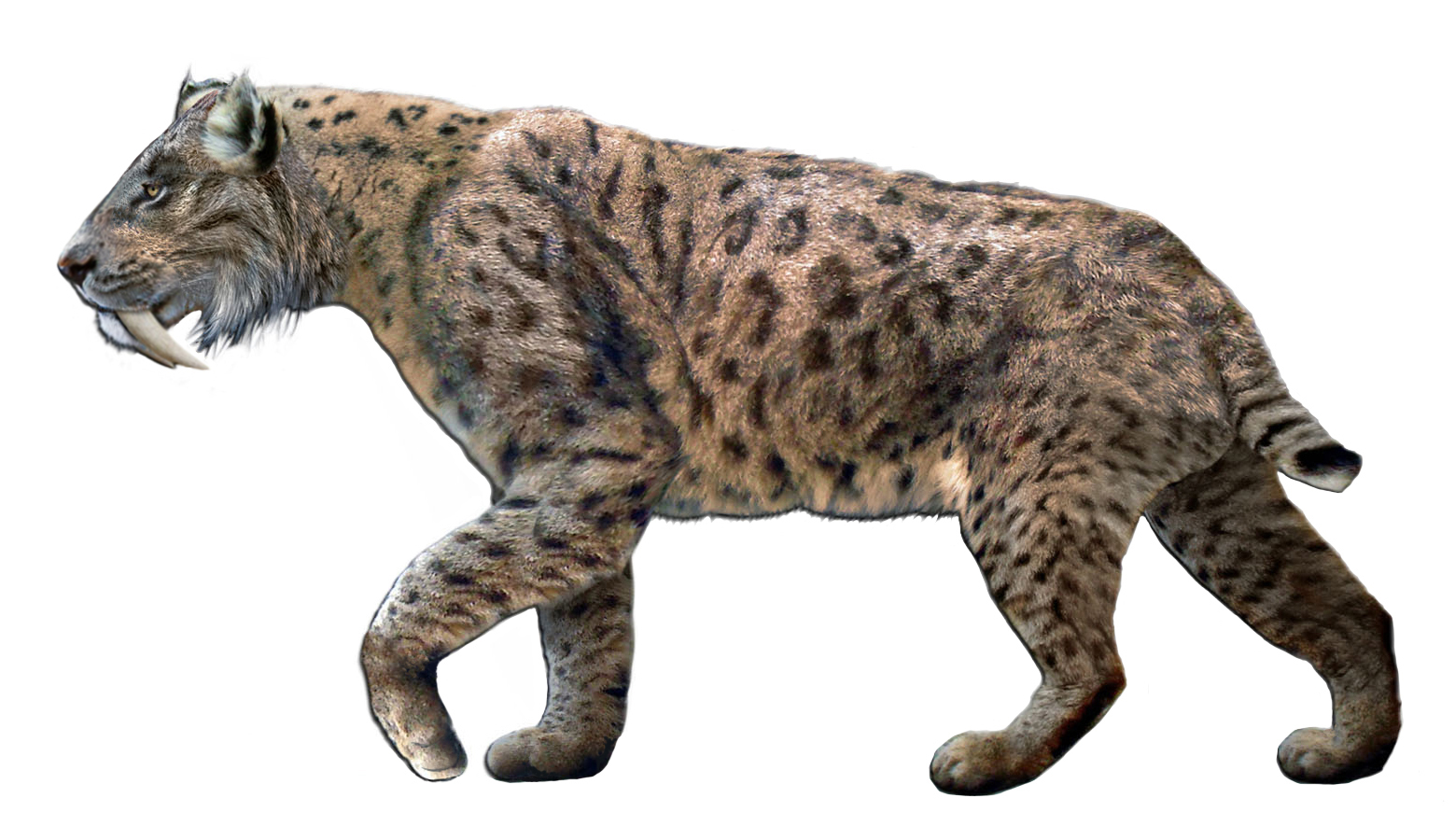
- Life restoration of the Pleistocene-Holocene saber-tooth cat Smilodon
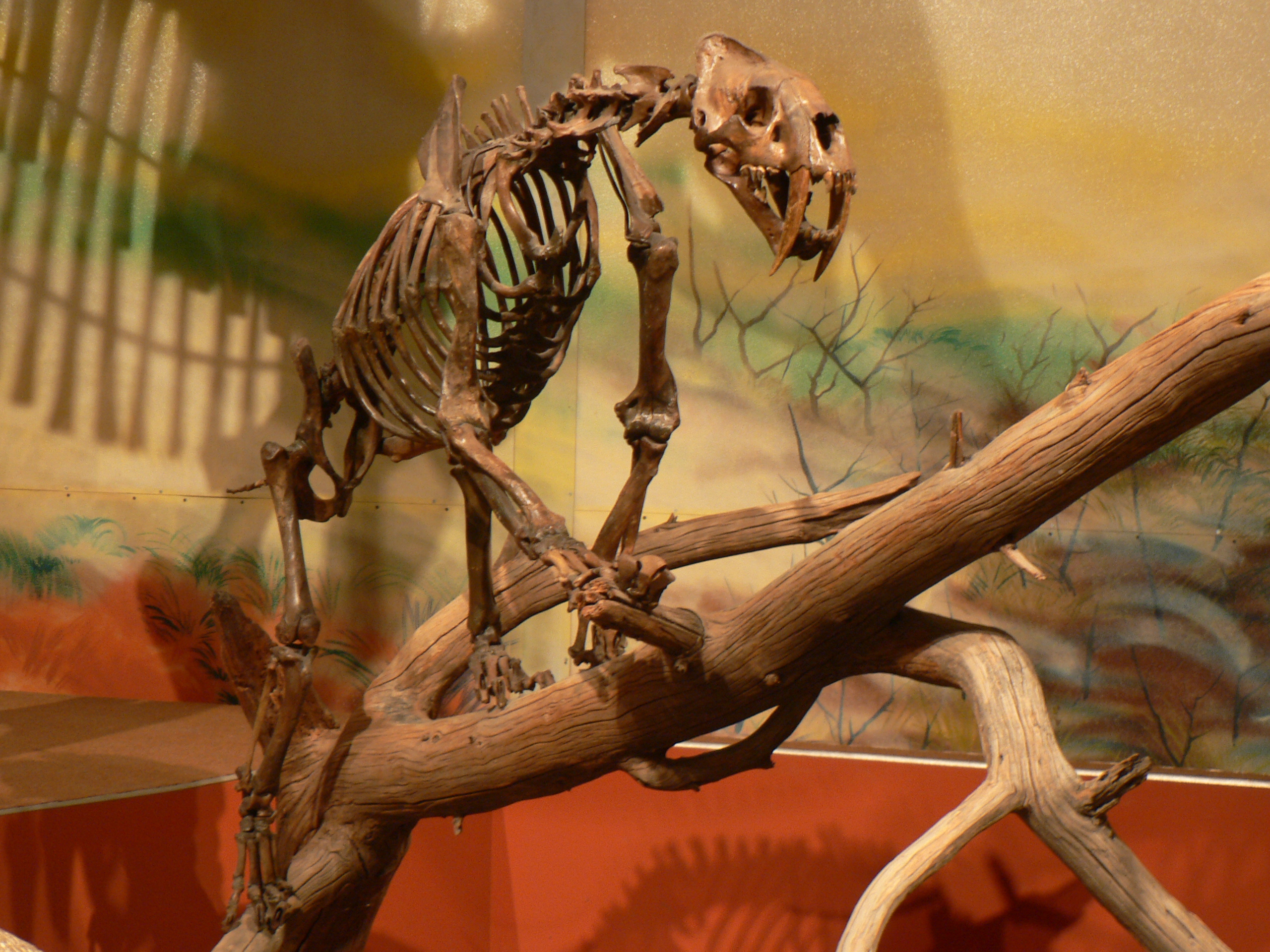
  Fossilized skeleton of the Pleistocene-Holocene saber-tooth cat Smilodon mounted in a climbing posture
  †Smilodon
  - †Smilodon fatalis
- Smittina
  - †Smittina ampla – type locality for species
  - †Smittina angulata
  - †Smittina cophia – type locality for species
  - †Smittina coronata
  - †Smittina exigua
  - †Smittina granulosa – type locality for species
  - †Smittina jacksonica
  - †Smittina portentosa
  - †Smittina pupa – type locality for species
  - †Smittina reticuloides – type locality for species
  - †Smittina telum – type locality for species
  - †Smittina tubulata
- Smittipora
  - †Smittipora tenuis
- Solariella
  - †Solariella cancellata
  - †Solariella fungina
  - †Solariella louisiana
  - †Solariella stalagmium
  - †Solariella sylvaerupis
  - †Solariella tricostata
- Solariorbis
  - †Solariorbis depressus
  - †Solariorbis liniferus
  - †Solariorbis planulatus
  - †Solariorbis rotulus
  - †Solariorbis subangulatus
- †Solarium
  - †Solarium periscelidum
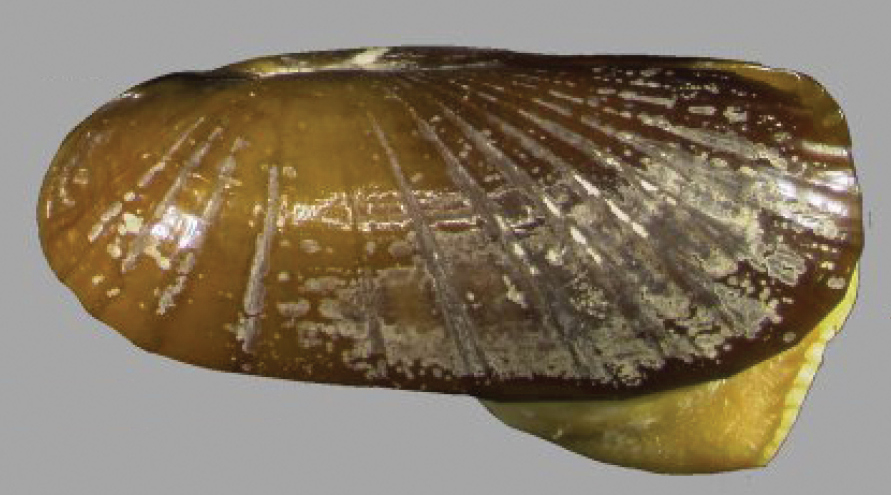
- Modern specimen of the marine bivalve Solemya
  Solemya
  - †Solemya alabamensis
  - †Solemya petricoloides
- Solena
  - †Solena lisbonensis
- Sorex
- Sphenotrochus
  - †Sphenotrochus claibornensis – type locality for species
  - †Sphenotrochus nanus
- Sphyraena – tentative report
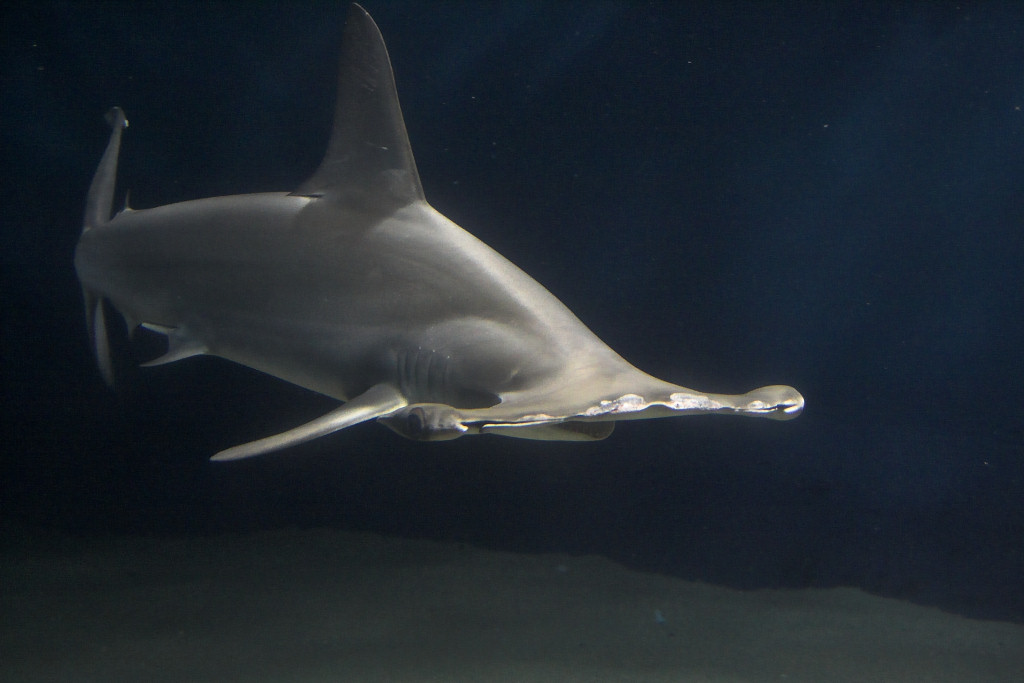
- A living Sphyrna hammerhead shark
  Sphyrna
  - †Sphyrna gilmorei – type locality for species
- Spilogale – tentative report
  - †Spilogale putorius
- †Spiratella
  - †Spiratella augustana
- Spiroloculina
  - †Spiroloculina bidentata
- Spirorbis
- †Spirorbula – tentative report
- Spisula
  - †Spisula decisa
  - †Spisula jacksonensis
  - †Spisula parilis
  - †Spisula praetenuis
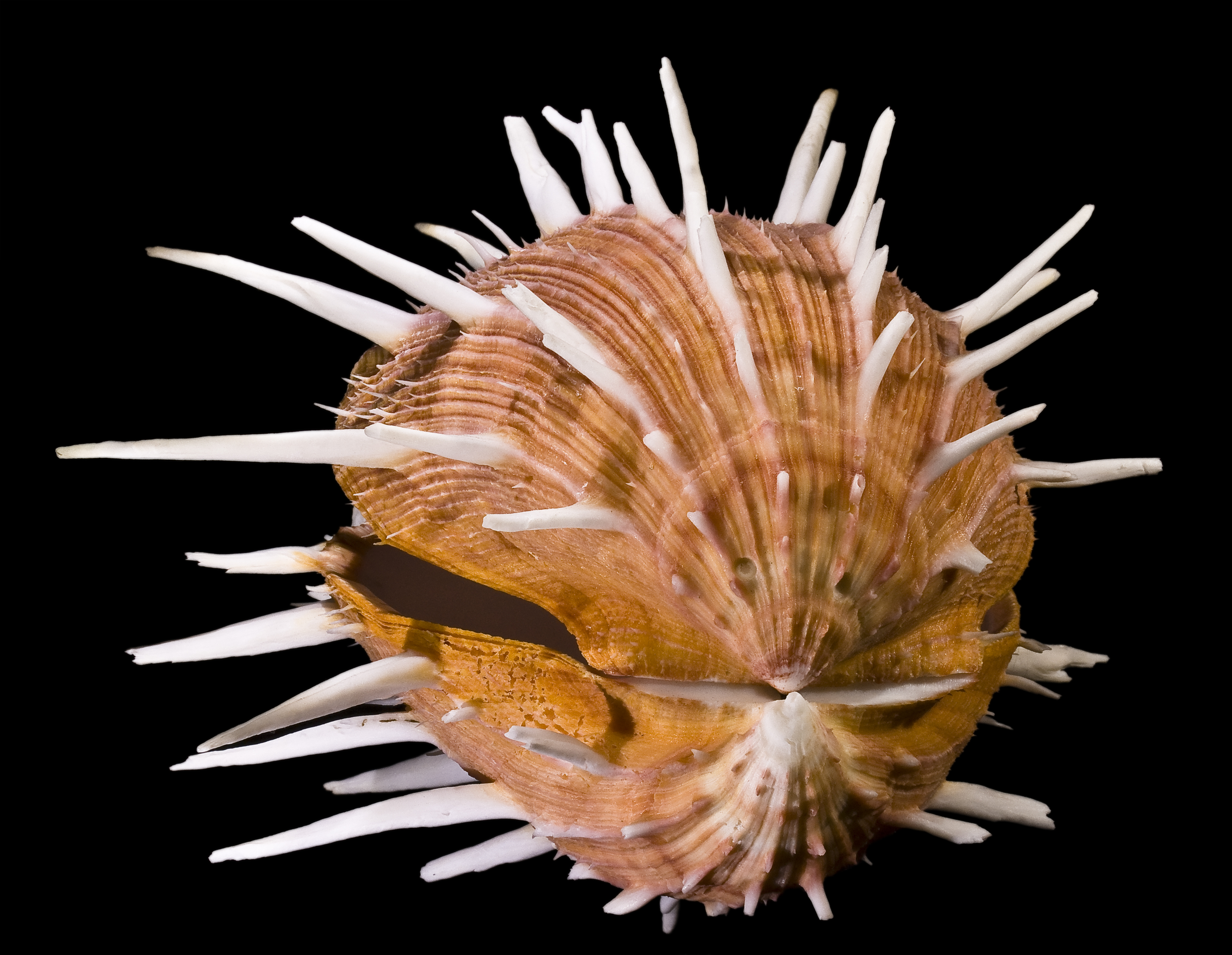
- Shell of a Spondylus, or spiny oyster
  Spondylus
  - †Spondylus dumosus
  - †Spondylus hollisteri
- Sportella
  - †Sportella alabamensis
  - †Sportella gregorioi
  - †Sportella oblonga
- †Stamenocella
  - †Stamenocella grandis
  - †Stamenocella inferaviculifera
  - †Stamenocella intermedia – type locality for species
  - †Stamenocella mediaviculifera
  - †Stamenocella midwayanica
  - †Stamenocella pyriformis
- †Steganoporella
  - †Steganoporella vicksburgica
- Steginoporella
  - †Steginoporella jacksonica
- Stenocyathus
- †Stephanomorpha – type locality for genus
  - †Stephanomorpha monticuliformis – type locality for species
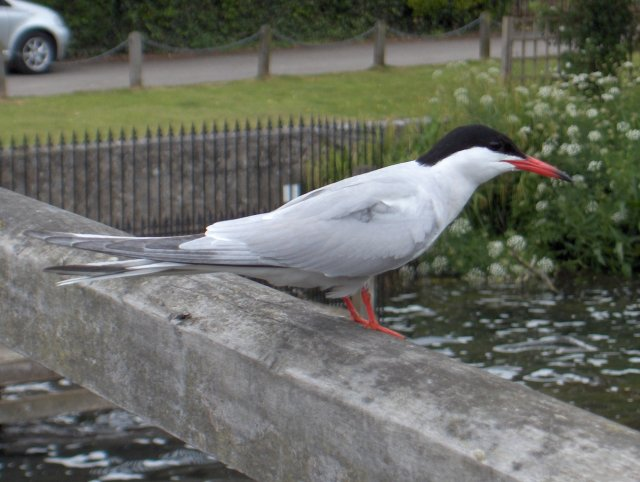
- A living Sterna tern
  Sterna
- Stomachetosella
  - †Stomachetosella crassicollis
- Storeria
- †Strepsidura
  - †Strepsidura contorea
  - †Strepsidura heilprini
  - †Strepsidura mediavia
- †Streptochetus
  - †Streptochetus conybearii
  - †Streptochetus limulus
- Striarca – or unidentified comparable form
  - †Striarca harrisi
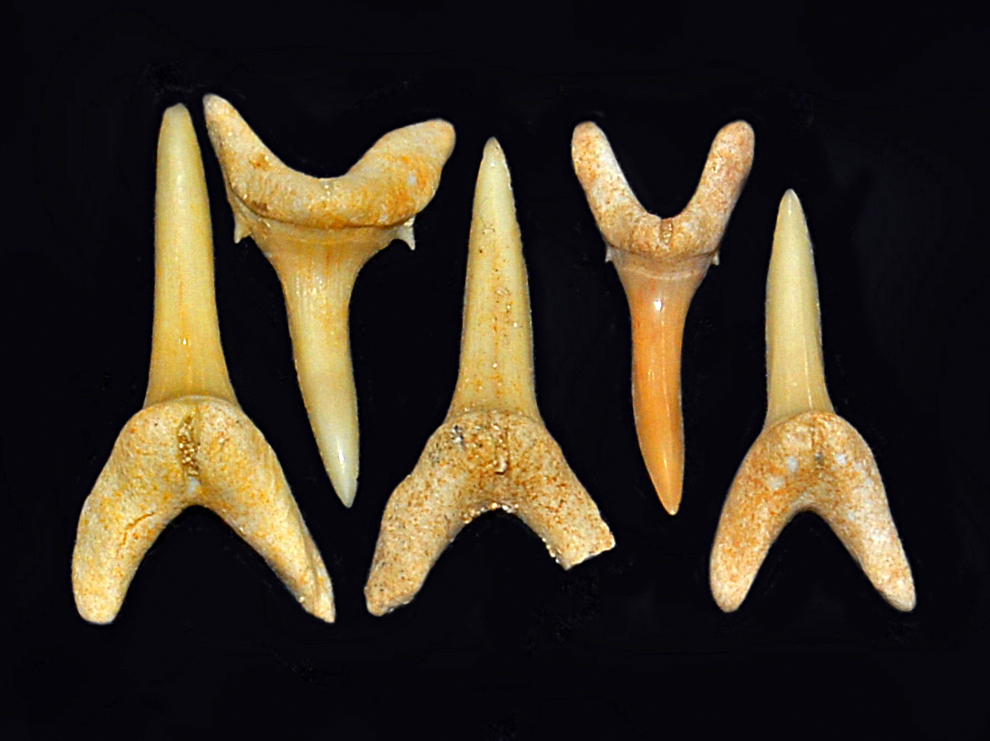
- Fossilized teeth of the Paleocene-Miocene sandshark Striatolamia
  †Striatolamia
  - †Striatolamia macrota
- Strioturbonilla
  - †Strioturbonilla harrisi
- Strix
  - †Strix varia – or unidentified comparable form
- †Stromatopora
  - †Stromatopora minuta – type locality for species
  - †Stromatopora polygona
- Strombus
  - †Strombus albirupianus
- Stylophora
  - †Stylophora ponderosa
- †Sullivania
  - †Sullivania exilloides
  - †Sullivania fisherensis
  - †Sullivania hicoricola
  - †Sullivania roscoei
  - †Sullivania tombigbeensis
- Surculites
  - †Surculites engonatus
- †Surculoma
  - †Surculoma calantica
  - †Surculoma falsabenes
  - †Surculoma fita
  - †Surculoma nebulosa
  - †Surculoma penrosei
  - †Surculoma servatoidea
  - †Surculoma subequalis
  - †Surculoma tabulata
- Sveltella
  - †Sveltella parva
  - †Sveltella sotoensis
  - †Sveltella turritissima
- Sveltia
  - †Sveltia alveata
  - †Sveltia gilberti
  - †Sveltia priama
- †Sycospira
  - †Sycospira americanae
- †Sycostoma
  - †Sycostoma americanae
- Sylvilagus
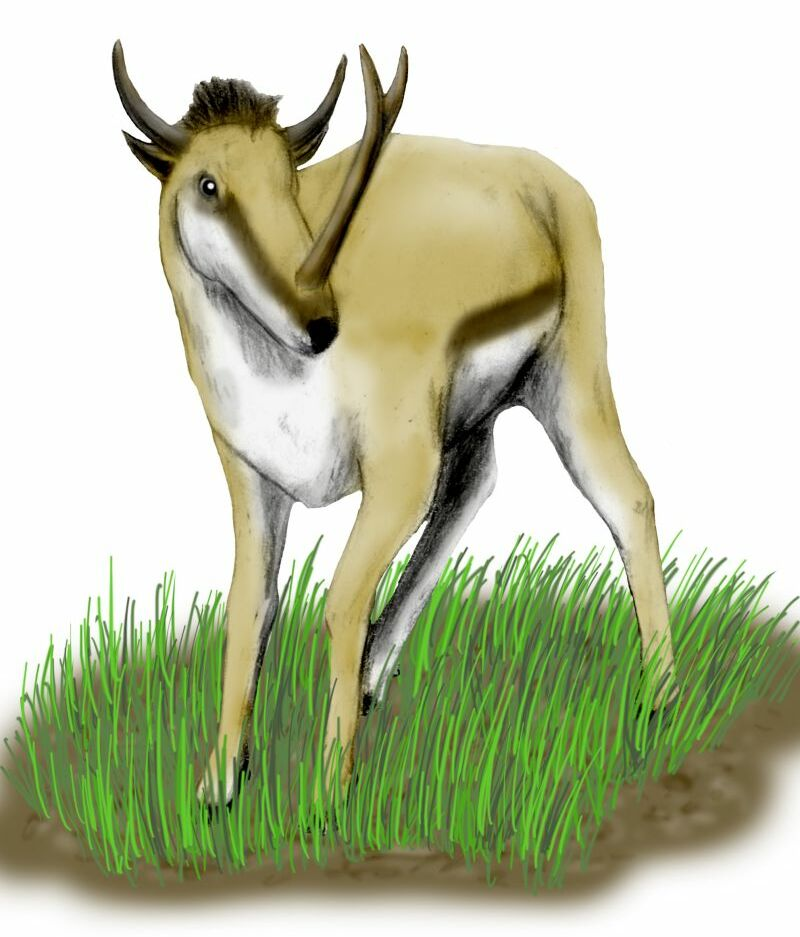
- Life restoration of the Miocene even-toed ungulate Synthetoceras
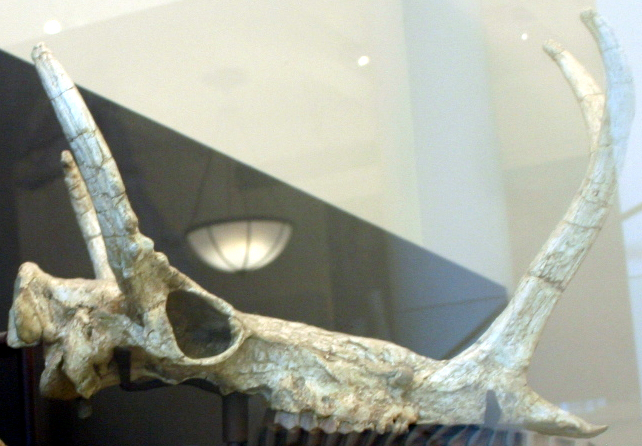
  Fossilized cranium of the Miocene even-toed ungulate Synthetoceras
  †Synthetoceras
  - †Synthetoceras davisorum – type locality for species
  - †Synthetoceras tricornatus – or unidentified comparable form

== T ==
- †Tallahattaophis – type locality for genus
  - †Tallahattaophis dunni – type locality for species
- Tapirus
- Teinostoma
  - †Teinostoma angulare
  - †Teinostoma subrotundum
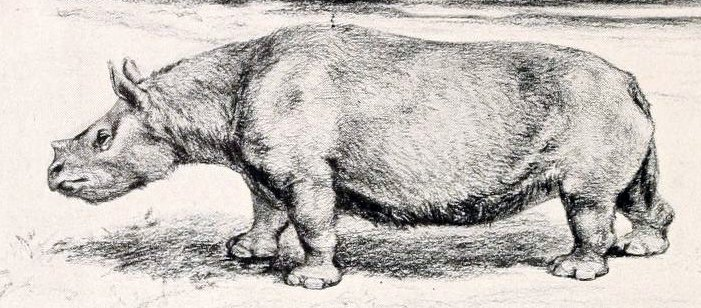
- Restoration of the Miocene-Pliocene rhinoceros Teleoceras
  †Teleoceras
- †Teleosteorum – report made of unidentified related form or using admittedly obsolete nomenclature
- Tellina
  - †Tellina aldrichi
  - †Tellina alta
  - †Tellina bellsiana
  - †Tellina cossmanni
  - †Tellina cynoglossa
  - †Tellina cynoglossula
  - †Tellina estellensis
  - †Tellina greggi
  - †Tellina leana
  - †Tellina linifera
  - †Tellina semipapyria
  - †Tellina semirotunda
  - †Tellina subtriangularis
  - †Tellina tallicheti
  - †Tellina temperata
  - †Tellina trumani
- Temnocidaris – tentative report
- Tenagodus
  - †Tenagodus vitis
- Tenarea – tentative report
- †Tenuiacteon
  - †Tenuiacteon pertenuis
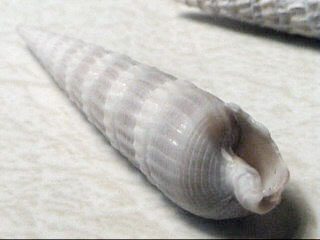
- Shell of a Terebra augur sea snail
  Terebra
  - †Terebra mirula
  - †Terebra polygyra
  - †Terebra texagyra
  - †Terebra ziga
- Terebratulina
  - †Terebratulina alabamensis
  - †Terebratulina brundidgensis
  - †Terebratulina lachryma
- †Terebrifusus
  - †Terebrifusus – type locality for species A informal
  - †Terebrifusus amoenus
  - †Terebrifusus multiplicatus
- Teredo
  - †Teredo ringens
  - †Teredo simplex
  - †Teredo simplexopsis
- †Textivenus
  - †Textivenus retisculpta
- Textularia
  - †Textularia cuyleri – or unidentified comparable form
  - †Textularia dibollensis
  - †Textularia hannai
- Thamnophis
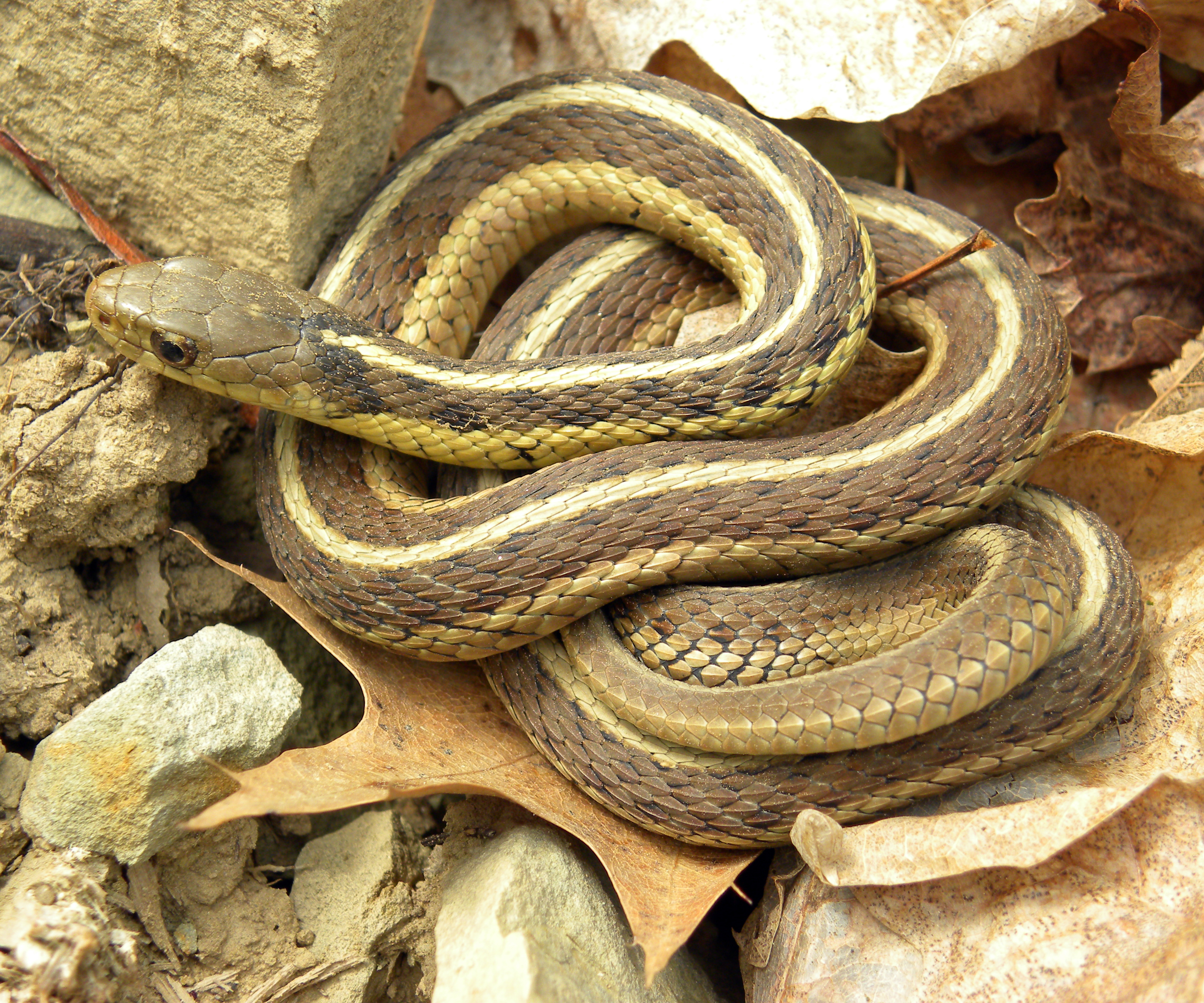
  - A living Thamnophis sirtalis, or common garter snake
    †Thamnophis sirtalis
- Thecidellina
  - †Thecidellina alabamensis – type locality for species
- Thiara
  - †Thiara aldrichi
- †Tibiella
  - †Tibiella marshi
- †Tiburnus
  - †Tiburnus eboreus
- †Tornatellaea
  - †Tornatellaea bella
  - †Tornatellaea lata
  - †Tornatellaea quercollis
- Tornus
  - †Tornus infraplicatus
- †Toulminella
  - †Toulminella alabamensis
- †Toweius
  - †Toweius petalosus – type locality for species
- †Trachichthyidarum – report made of unidentified related form or using admittedly obsolete nomenclature
  - †Trachichthyidarum stringeri – type locality for species
- Trachyleberis
  - †Trachyleberis davidwhitei
  - †Trachyleberis montgomeryensis
  - †Trachyleberis washburni
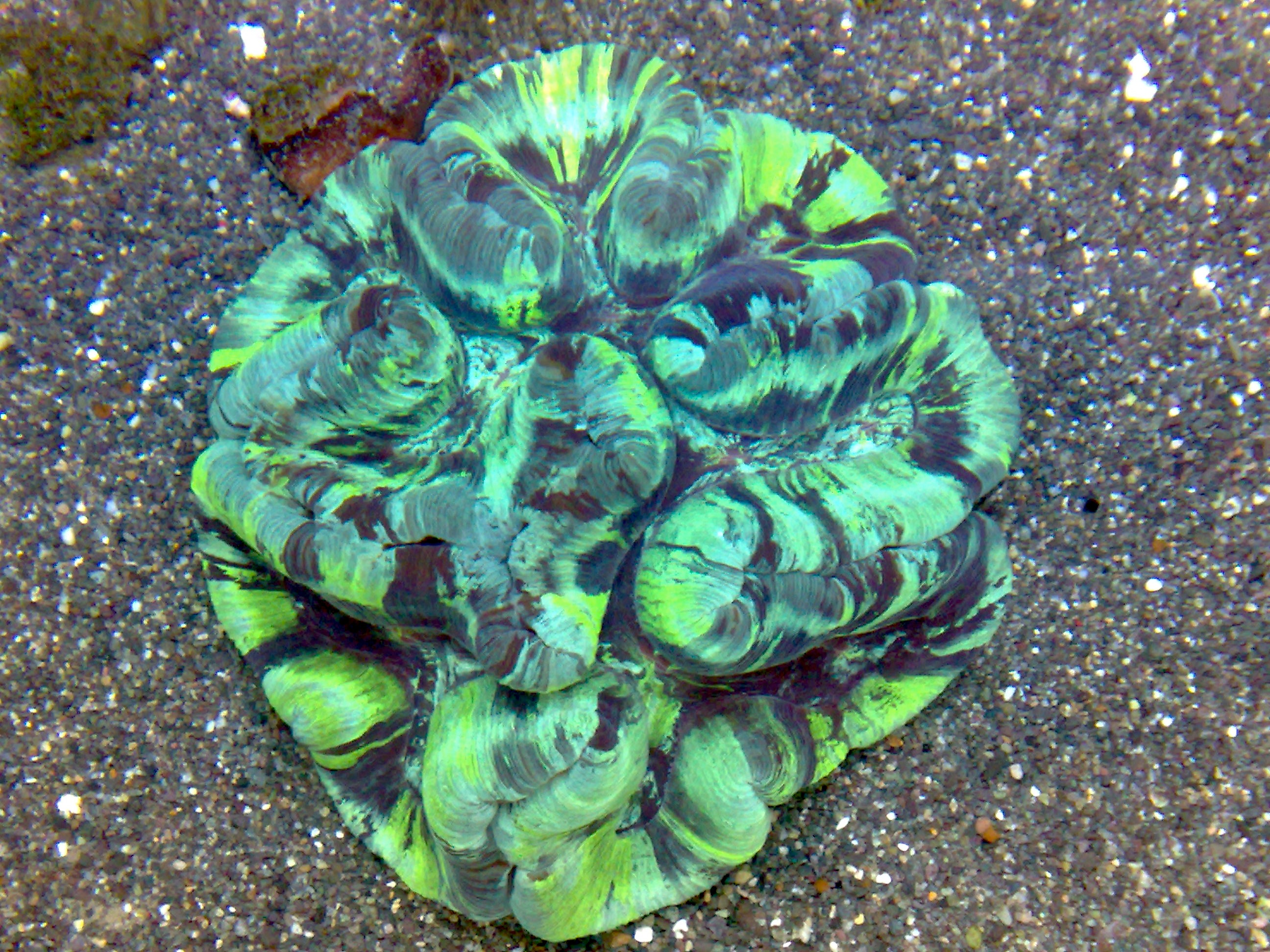
- Living Trachyphyllia geoffroyi, or open brain coral
  Trachyphyllia
- †Transovula
  - †Transovula regularoidea
- Trapezium
  - †Trapezium claibornense
- Trichiurides
- Trichiurus
- †Triginglymus – type locality for genus
  - †Triginglymus gnythophoreus
  - †Triginglymus hyperochus – type locality for species
- †Trigonarca – report made of unidentified related form or using admittedly obsolete nomenclature
  - †Trigonarca corbuloides
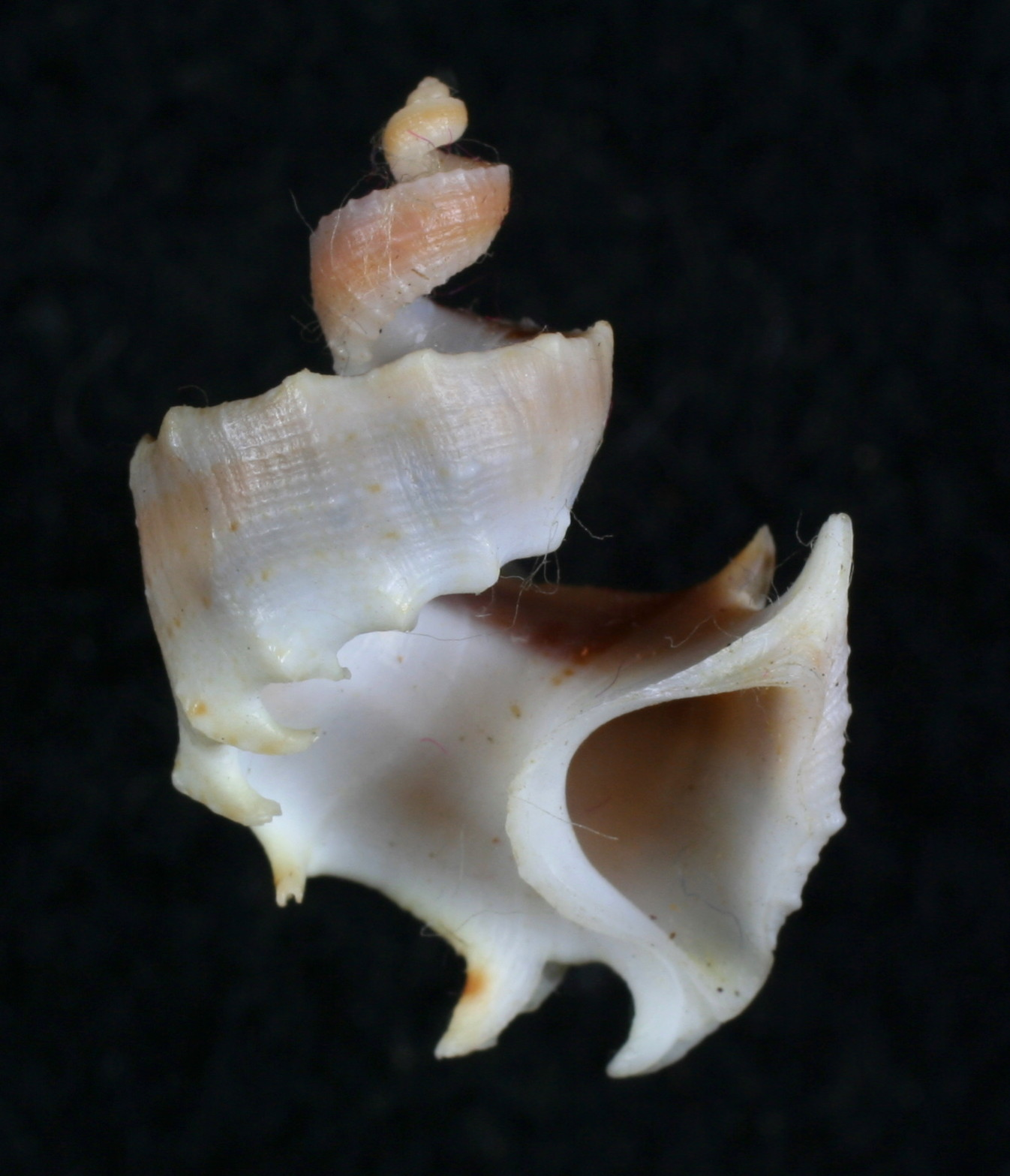
- Shell of a Trigonostoma nutmeg sea snail
  Trigonostoma
  - †Trigonostoma aurorae
  - †Trigonostoma babylonicum
  - †Trigonostoma gemmatum
  - †Trigonostoma marieanum
  - †Trigonostoma panones
  - †Trigonostoma penrosei
  - †Trigonostoma pulcherrimum
- †Trinacria
  - †Trinacria cuneus
- Trionyx
- Triphora
  - †Triphora distincta
  - †Triphora major
  - †Triphora similis
- †Tripia
  - †Tripia anteatripla
- †Tritonatractus
  - †Tritonatractus pearlensis
- Trochita
  - †Trochita aperta
- Trochocyathus
  - †Trochocyathus cingulatus – type locality for species
  - †Trochocyathus lakii – type locality for species
- †Trochoseris
  - †Trochoseris aperta
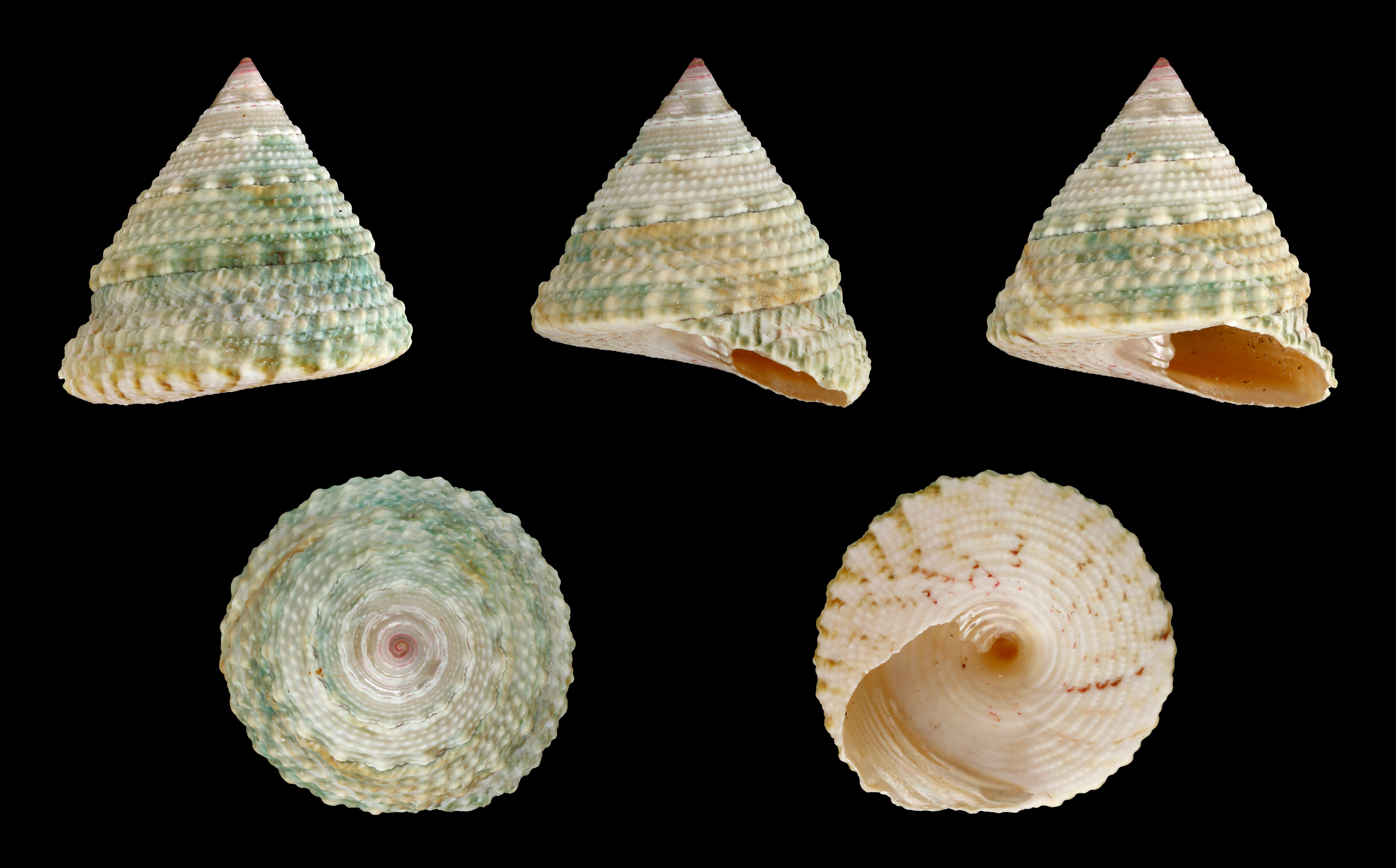
- Shell in multiple views of a Trochus top sea snail
  Trochus – report made of unidentified related form or using admittedly obsolete nomenclature
  - †Trochus gumus
- Trophon
  - †Trophon caudatoides
- †Tropisurcula
  - †Tropisurcula crenula – tentative report
- †Trypanotoma
  - †Trypanotoma carlottae
  - †Trypanotoma longispira
  - †Trypanotoma melanella
  - †Trypanotoma terebriformis
- †Trypanotopsis
  - †Trypanotopsis texana
- Trypostega
  - †Trypostega elongata – type locality for species
  - †Trypostega inornata
  - †Trypostega venusta
- Tubiola
  - †Tubiola nautiloides
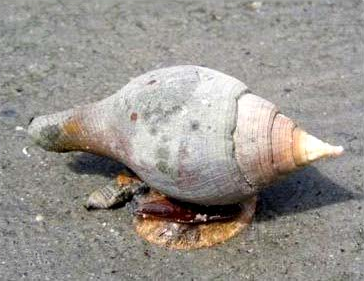
- A living Turbinella, or chank
  Turbinella – or unidentified related form
- †Turbinolia
  - †Turbinolia claibornensis – type locality for species
  - †Turbinolia dickersoni – type locality for species
  - †Turbinolia gigantissima – type locality for species
  - †Turbinolia pharetra
  - †Turbinolia subtercisa
  - †Turbinolia tenuis – type locality for species
  - †Turbinolia vicksburgensis
- Turbo – report made of unidentified related form or using admittedly obsolete nomenclature
  - †Turbo zecus
- Turboella
  - †Turboella ziga
- Turbonilla
  - †Turbonilla agrestis
  - †Turbonilla bidentata
  - †Turbonilla clinensis
  - †Turbonilla neglecta
  - †Turbonilla pellegrina
  - †Turbonilla sabina
  - †Turbonilla tardiusculus
  - †Turbonilla tuscahomensis
- Turdus
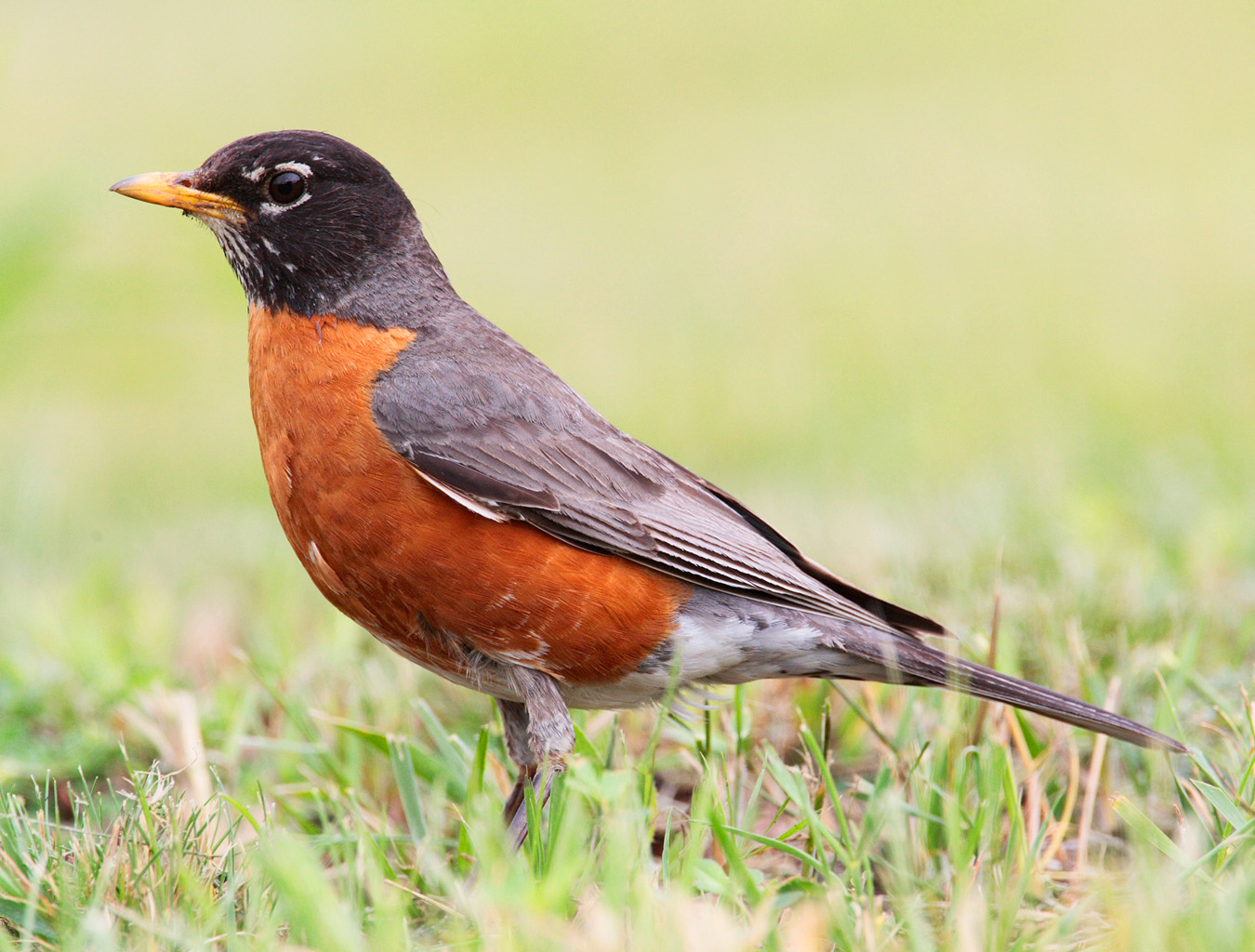
  - A living Turdus migratorius, or American robin
    †Turdus migratorius
- Turricula
  - †Turricula aldreperta
  - †Turricula nasuta
  - †Turricula plenta
  - †Turricula taltibia
- Turris
  - †Turris adeona
  - †Turris bimoniatus
  - †Turris capax
  - †Turris leania
  - †Turris longipersa
  - †Turris mediavia
  - †Turris moniliata
  - †Turris nodoideus
  - †Turris persa
  - †Turris quercollis
  - †Turris sigma
  - †Turris specus
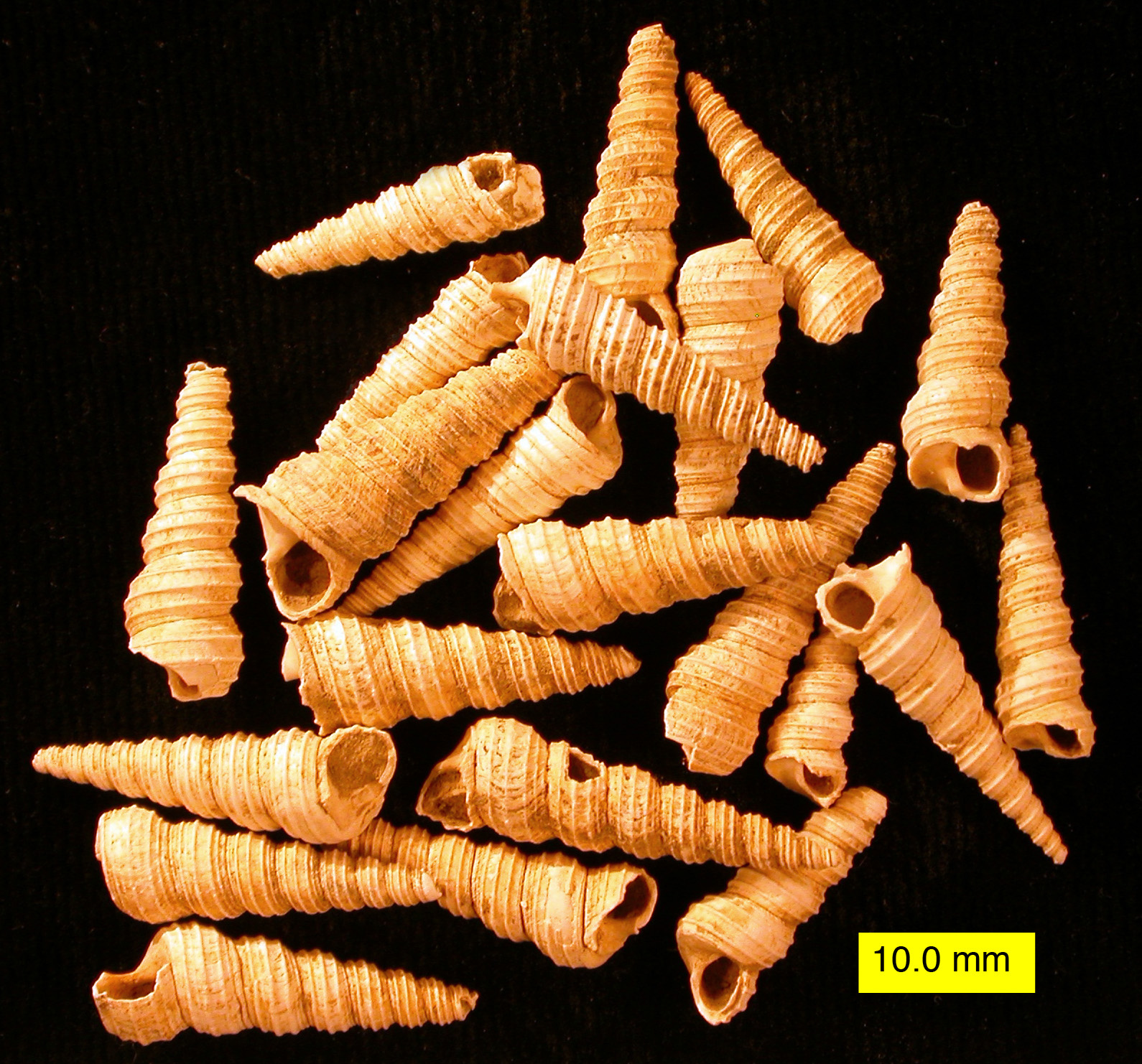
- Fossilized shells of the Late Jurassic-modern tower snail Turritella
  Turritella
  - †Turritella aldrichi
  - †Turritella apita
  - †Turritella bellifera
  - †Turritella carninata – or unidentified comparable form
  - †Turritella claytonensis
  - †Turritella dutexata
  - †Turritella eurynome
  - †Turritella gatunensis – or unidentified comparable form
  - †Turritella ghigna
  - †Turritella gilberti
  - †Turritella hilli
  - †Turritella houstonia
  - †Turritella humerosa
  - †Turritella levicunea
  - †Turritella lisbonensis
  - †Turritella multilira
  - †Turritella nasuta
  - †Turritella nerinexa
  - †Turritella obruta
  - †Turritella postmortoni
  - †Turritella praecincta
  - †Turritella tennesseensis
- Tylocidaris
  - †Tylocidaris salina – type locality for species
- Tympanuchus
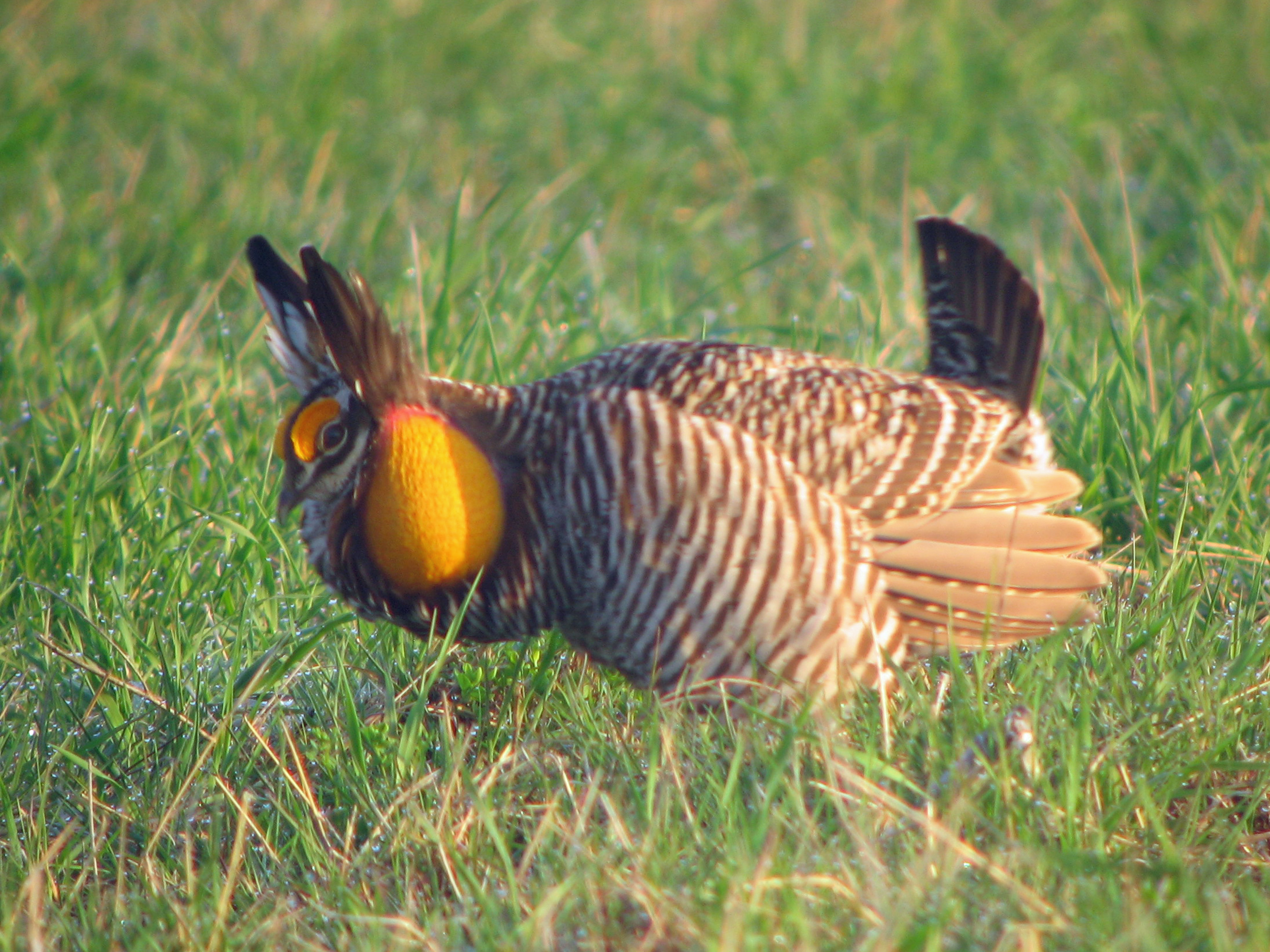
  - A living Tympanuchus cupido, or greater prairie chicken
    †Tympanuchus cupido

== U ==
- Umbonula
  - †Umbonula ceratomorpha
  - †Umbonula miser
- Umbraculum
  - †Umbraculum sylvaerupis
- Uromitra
  - †Uromitra gracilis
  - †Uromitra terplicata
- Ursus
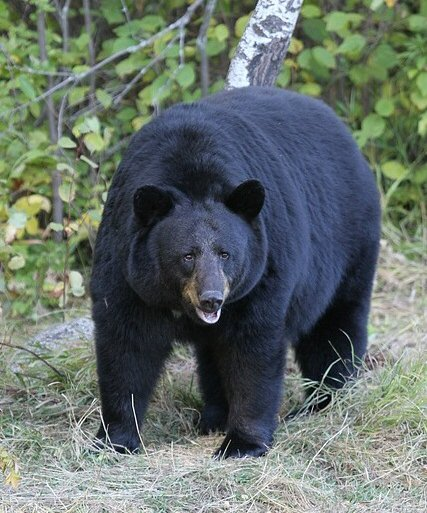
  - A living Ursus americanus, or American black bear
    †Ursus americanus

== V ==
- Venericardia
  - †Venericardia apodensata
  - †Venericardia aposmithi
  - †Venericardia aposmithii
  - †Venericardia augustoscrobis
  - †Venericardia bashiplata
  - †Venericardia carolinensis
  - †Venericardia claiboplata
  - †Venericardia claviger
  - †Venericardia complexicosta
  - †Venericardia cookei
  - †Venericardia densata
  - †Venericardia diversidentata
  - †Venericardia gulielmi
  - †Venericardia hatcheplata
  - †Venericardia horatiana
  - †Venericardia mediaplata
  - †Venericardia nanaplata
  - †Venericardia pilsbryi
  - †Venericardia planicosta
  - †Venericardia rotunda
  - †Venericardia smithii
  - †Venericardia stewarti
  - †Venericardia tortidens
  - †Venericardia turneri
- Verticordia
  - †Verticordia eocensis
  - †Verticordia sotoensis
- Vincularia
  - †Vincularia vicksburgia – type locality for species
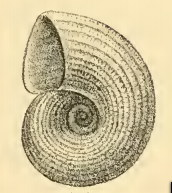
- Illustration of a shell of a Vitrinella sea snail
  Vitrinella
  - †Vitrinella aldrichi
- †Vokesula
  - †Vokesula aldrichi
  - †Vokesula smithvillensis
- †Volutilithes
  - †Volutilithes clarae
  - †Volutilithes florencis
  - †Volutilithes limopsis
  - †Volutilithes rugatus
- †Volvaria
  - †Volvaria alabamiensis
- †Volvariella
  - †Volvariella aldrichi

== W ==
- †Weisbordella
  - †Weisbordella johnsoni
- †Wythella

== X ==
- Xanthilites
  - †Xanthilites alabamensis
- Xenophora
- Xestoleberis
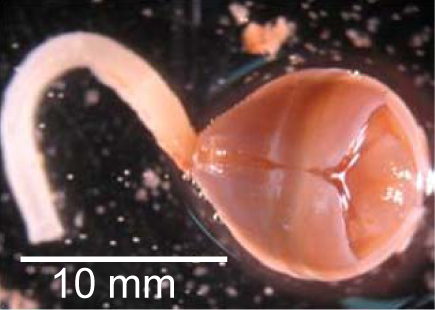
- A living Xylophaga angelwing marine bivalve
  Xylophaga
  - †Xylophaga mississippiensis

== Y ==
- Yoldia
  - †Yoldia eborea
  - †Yoldia pistorupes
  - †Yoldia semenoides

== Z ==
- †Zeugmatolepas
  - †Zeugmatolepas cretae – or unidentified comparable form
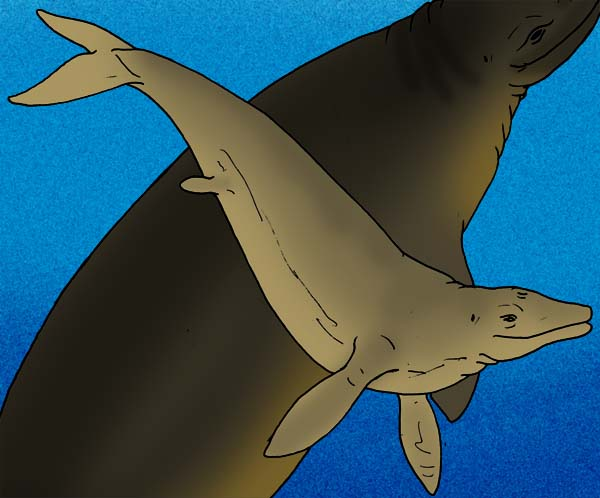
- Life restoration of the Eocene whale Zygorhiza
  †Zygorhiza
  - †Zygorhiza kochii – type locality for species
