= List of the Cenozoic life of Arkansas =

This list of the Cenozoic life of Arkansas contains the various prehistoric life-forms whose fossilized remains have been reported from within the US state of Arkansas and are between 66 million and 10,000 years of age.

== A ==
- †Abdounia
  - †Abdounia enniskilleni
- †Acrometa
- Acteon
  - †Acteon idoneus
- Agaronia
  - †Agaronia media
- Antalis
  - †Antalis vincense
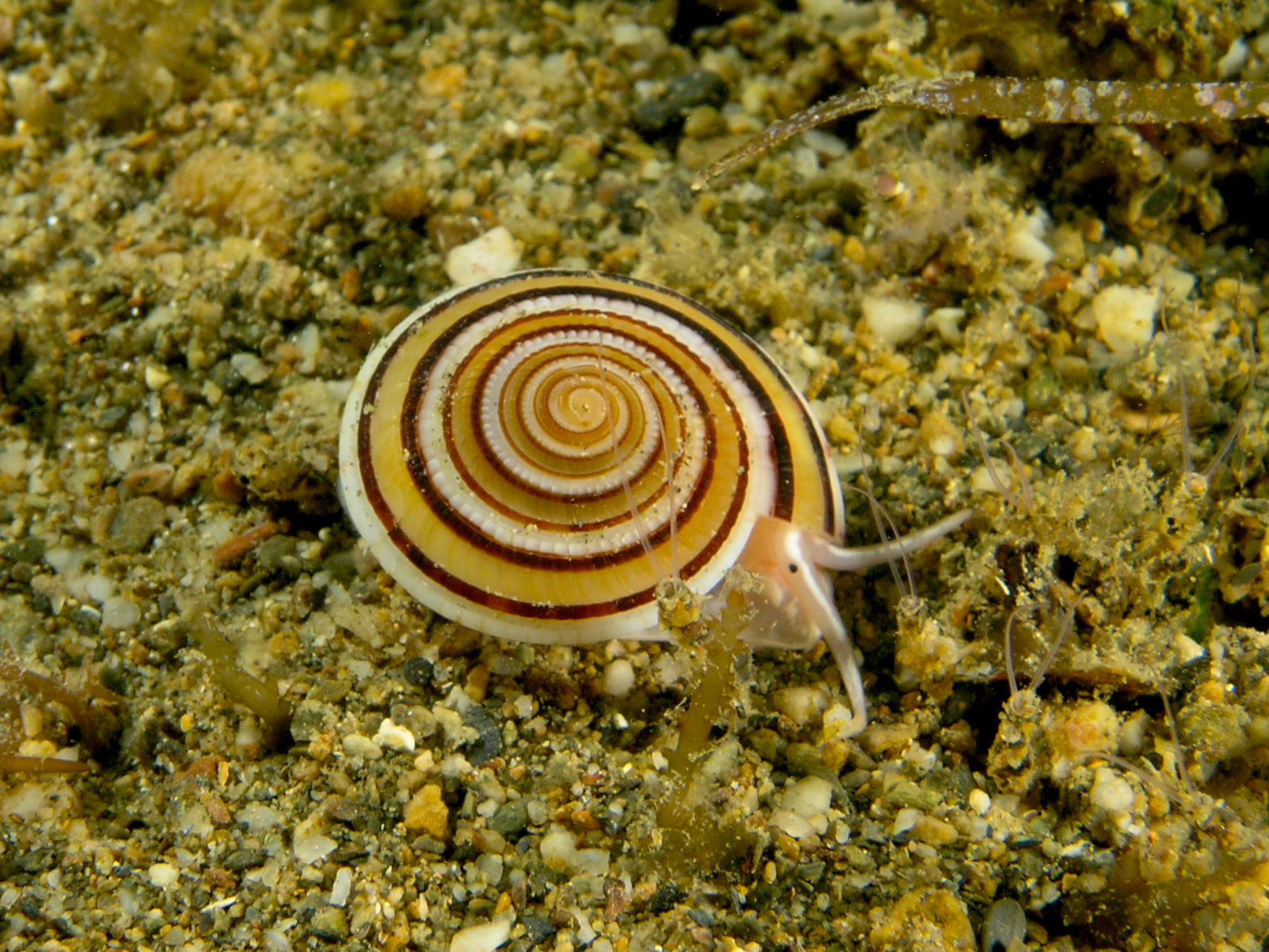
- A living Architectonica staircase shell sea snail
  Architectonica
  - †Architectonica bellistriata
- Arius – or unidentified comparable form
- Astrangia
  - †Astrangia harrisi – type locality for species
- Athleta
  - †Athleta symmetricus

== B ==
- Barbatia
  - †Barbatia corvamnis
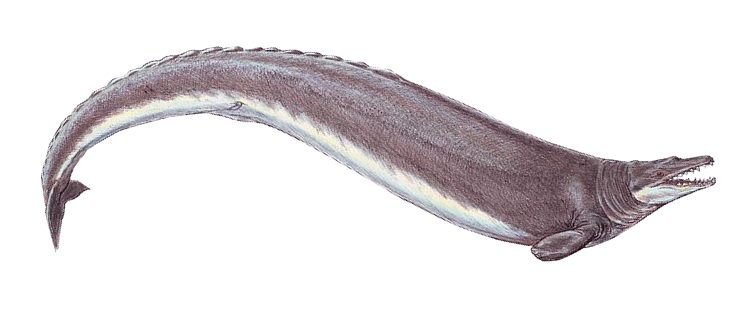
- Life restoration of the Eocene whale Basilosaurus
  †Basilosaurus
  - †Basilosaurus cetoides
- Bathytormus
  - †Bathytormus clarkensis
  - †Bathytormus flexurus
- Blarina
  - †Blarina brevicauda
- †Bootherium
  - †Bootherium bombifrons
- Brachidontes
  - †Brachidontes hamatoides
- †Brachyprotoma
  - †Brachyprotoma obtusata
- Bullia
  - †Bullia altilis

== C ==
- Caestocorbula
  - †Caestocorbula wailesiana
- †Calorhadia
  - †Calorhadia reginajacksonis
- †Calyptraphorus
  - †Calyptraphorus stamineus
- Canis
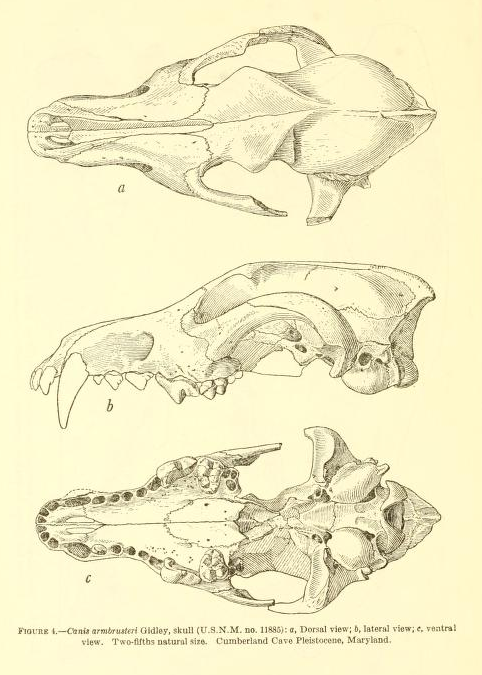
  - Illustration in multiple views of a fossilized skull of the Pleistocene Canis armbrusteri, or Armbruster's wolf
    †Canis armbrusteri
  - †Canis latrans
- Carcharhinus
  - †Carcharhinus gibbesi
- Carcharias
  - †Carcharias hopei
- †Caricella
  - †Caricella subangulata
- Caryocorbula
  - †Caryocorbula densata
  - †Caryocorbula willistoni
- Castor
  - †Castor canadensis
- Cervus
- Chlamys
  - †Chlamys corvina
- Clavilithes
  - †Clavilithes humerosus
- Coluber
  - †Coluber constrictor – or unidentified comparable form
- Conomitra
  - †Conomitra hammakeri
  - †Conomitra jacksonensis
- Conopeum
  - †Conopeum damicornis
- Conus
  - †Conus sauridens
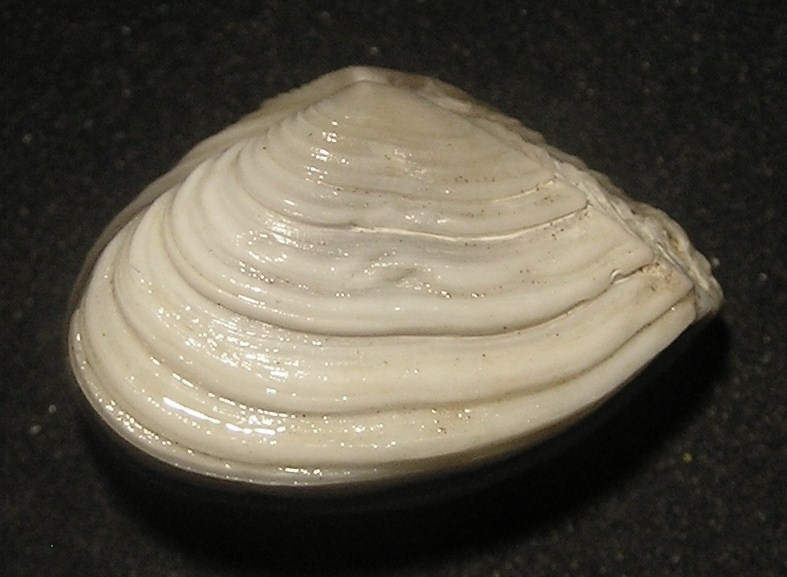
- Shell of a Corbula basket clam
  Corbula
  - †Corbula subcompressa
- †Cornulina
  - †Cornulina dalli
- †Coronia
  - †Coronia childreni
- Crassostrea
  - †Crassostrea alabamensis
- Crotalus
- Cytherea – report made of unidentified related form or using admittedly obsolete nomenclature

== D ==
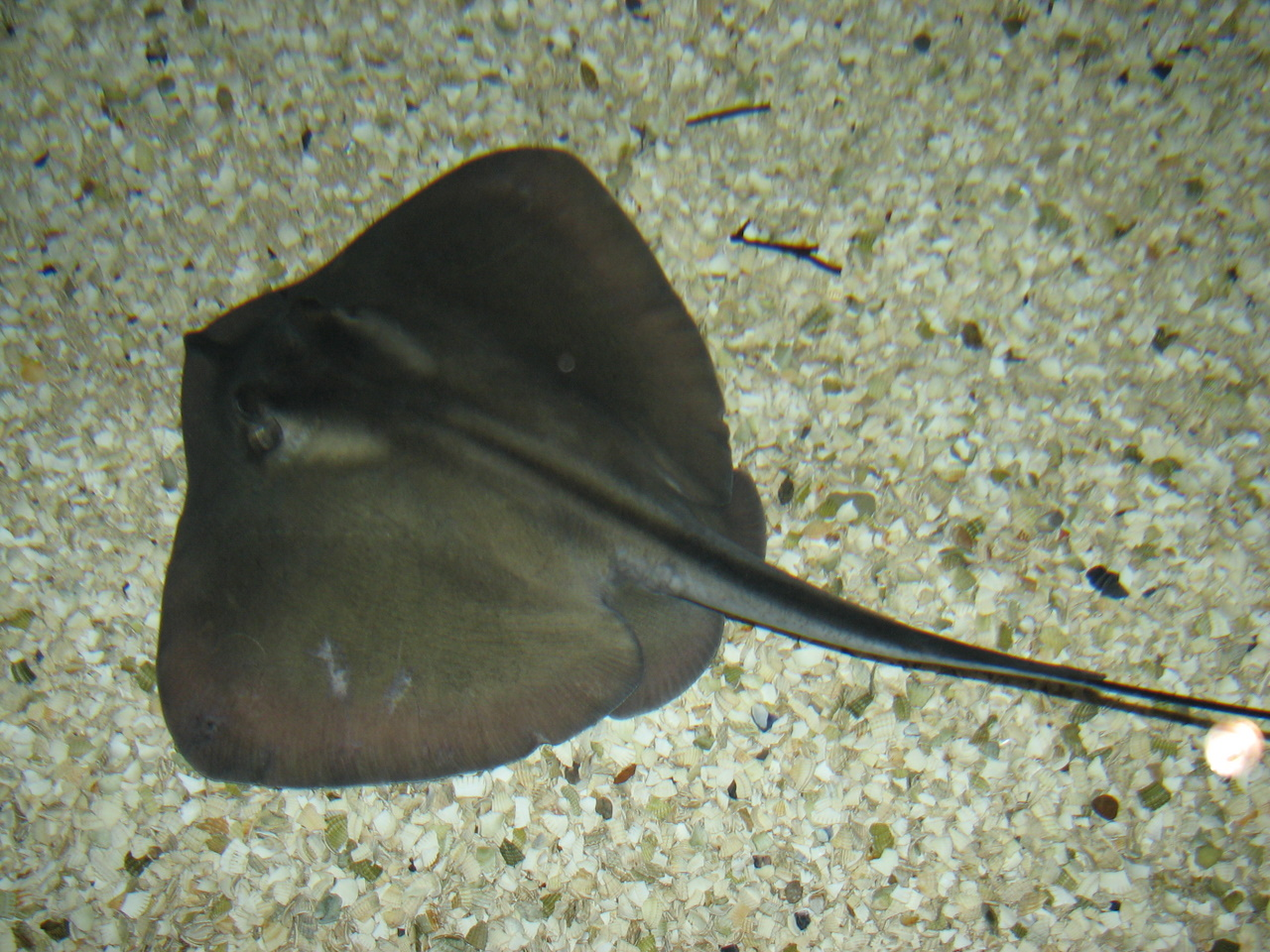
- A living Dasyatis stingray
  Dasyatis
- Dentalium
- †Diaphyodus
  - †Diaphyodus wilsoni
- †Diplobunops – or unidentified comparable form
  - †Diplobunops matthewi
- Diplodonta
  - †Diplodonta bulla

== E ==
- †Eocenidris – type locality for genus
  - †Eocenidris crassa – type locality for species
- †Eopleurotoma – tentative report
  - †Eopleurotoma albirupsis
- Epitonium
- Eptesicus
  - †Eptesicus fuscus
- Equus
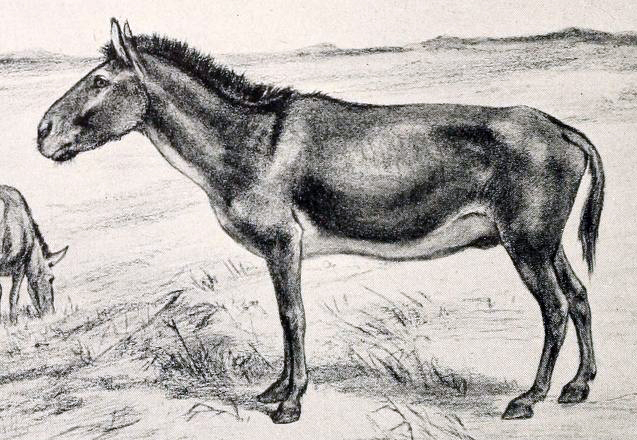
  - Restoration of the Pliocene-Holocene horse Equus scotti, or Scott's horse
    †Equus scotti – tentative report
- Erethizon
  - †Erethizon dorsatum
- Eurytellina
  - †Eurytellina linifera
  - †Eurytellina spillmani

== F ==
- Fusimitra
  - †Fusimitra millingtoni

== G ==
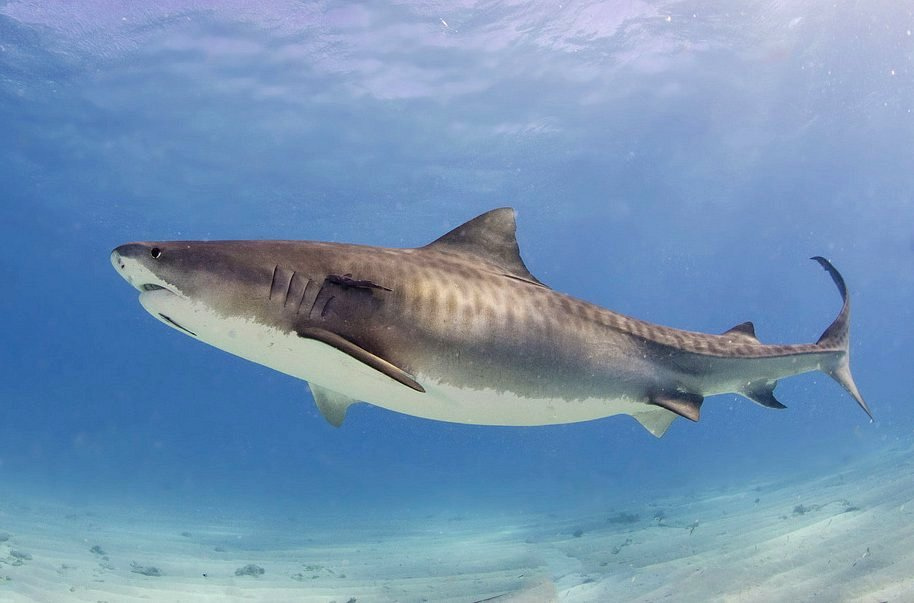
- A living Galeocerdo requiem shark
  Galeocerdo
  - †Galeocerdo latidens
- Galeodea
  - †Galeodea petersoni
- Galeorhinus
- Geomys
  - †Geomys bursarius
- Ginglymostoma
  - †Ginglymostoma serra

== H ==
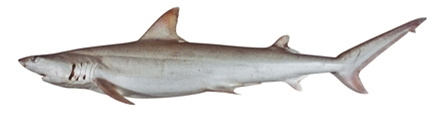
- A living Hemipristis weasel shark
  Hemipristis
  - †Hemipristis curvatus
- Hemisinus
  - †Hemisinus jacksonius
- †Hercoglossa
  - †Hercoglossa ulrichi
- Hexaplex
  - †Hexaplex marksi
- †Hilgardia
  - †Hilgardia multilineata

== I ==
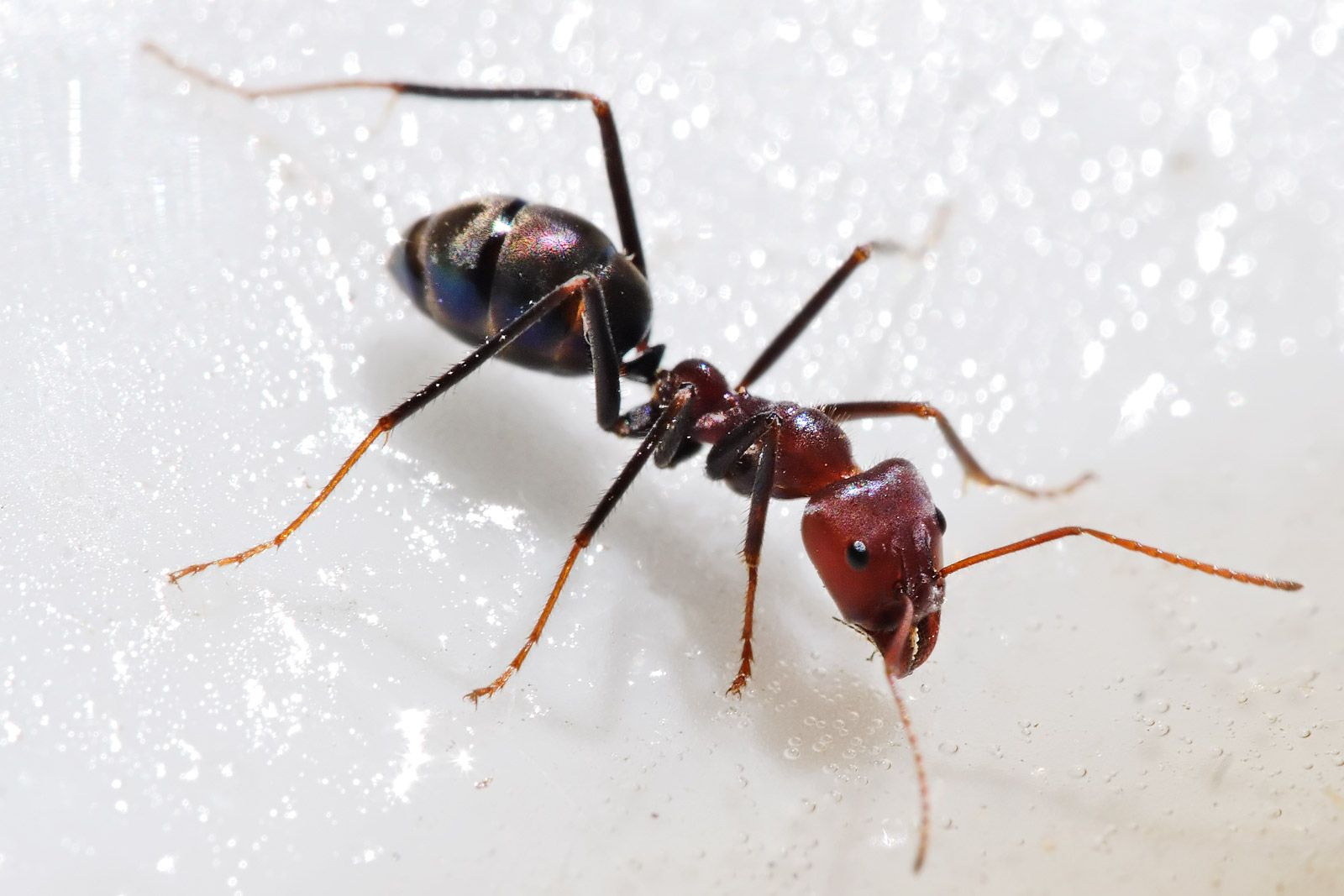
- A living Iridomyrmex, or rainbow ant
  †Iridomyrmex
  - †Iridomyrmex mapesi – type locality for species

== K ==
- †Kapalmerella
  - †Kapalmerella arenicola
  - †Kapalmerella mortoni

== L ==
- †Lacunaria
- Latirus
  - †Latirus humilior
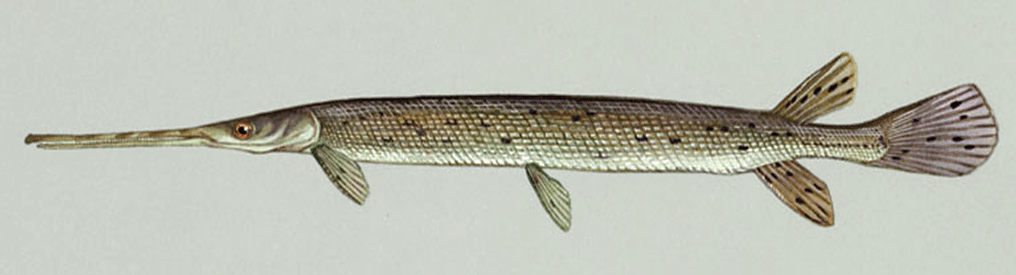
- Illustration of a living Lepisosteus, or gar
  Lepisosteus
- Lepus
  - †Lepus alleni
  - †Lepus americanus – tentative report
- †Levifusus
  - †Levifusus branneri
- †Linthia
  - †Linthia alabamensis
- †Lirodiscus
  - †Lirodiscus jacksonensis
- †Litorhadia – tentative report
  - †Litorhadia albirupina
- Lynx
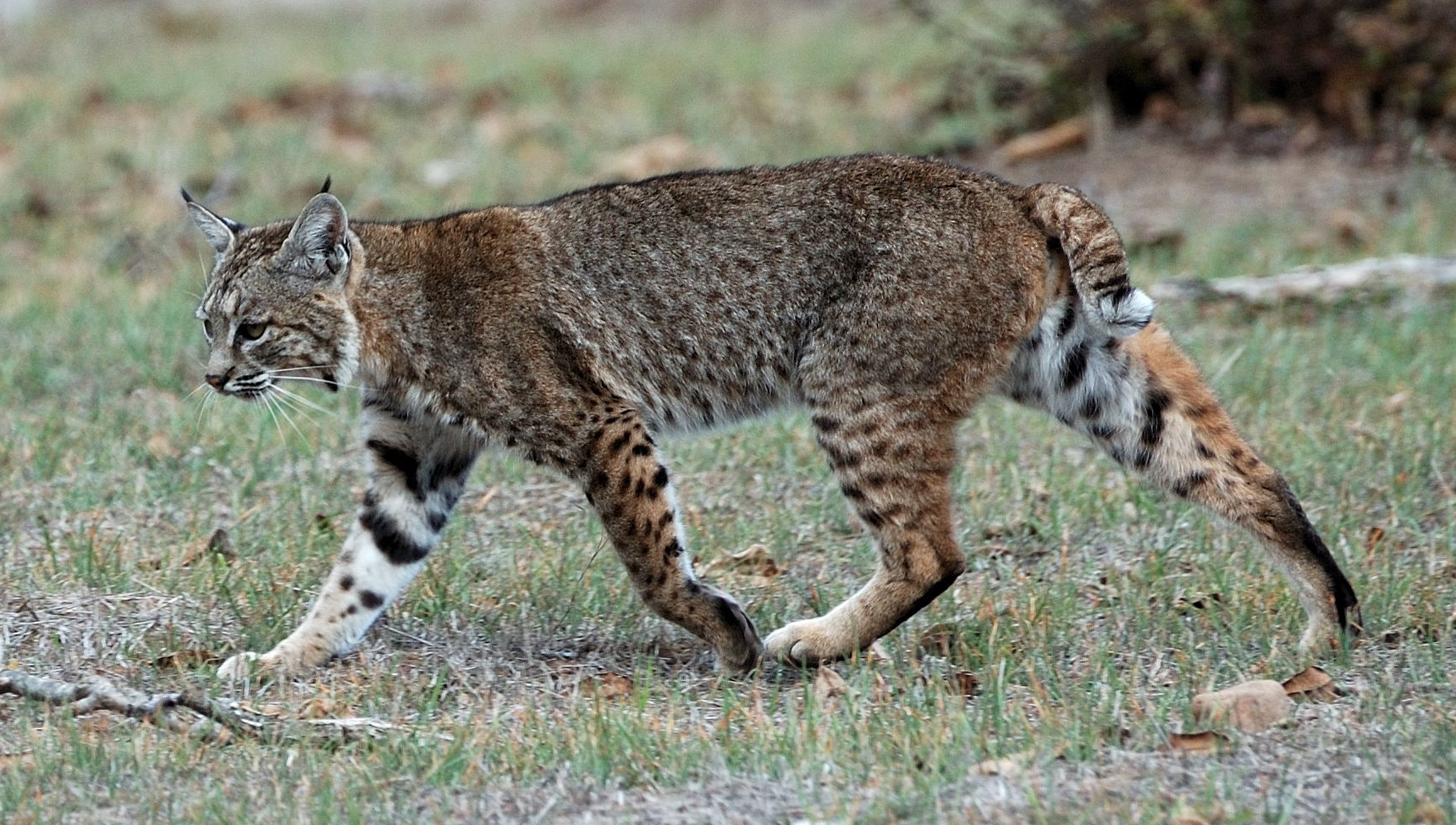
  - A living Lynx rufus, or bobcat
    †Lynx rufus

== M ==
- †Mammuthus
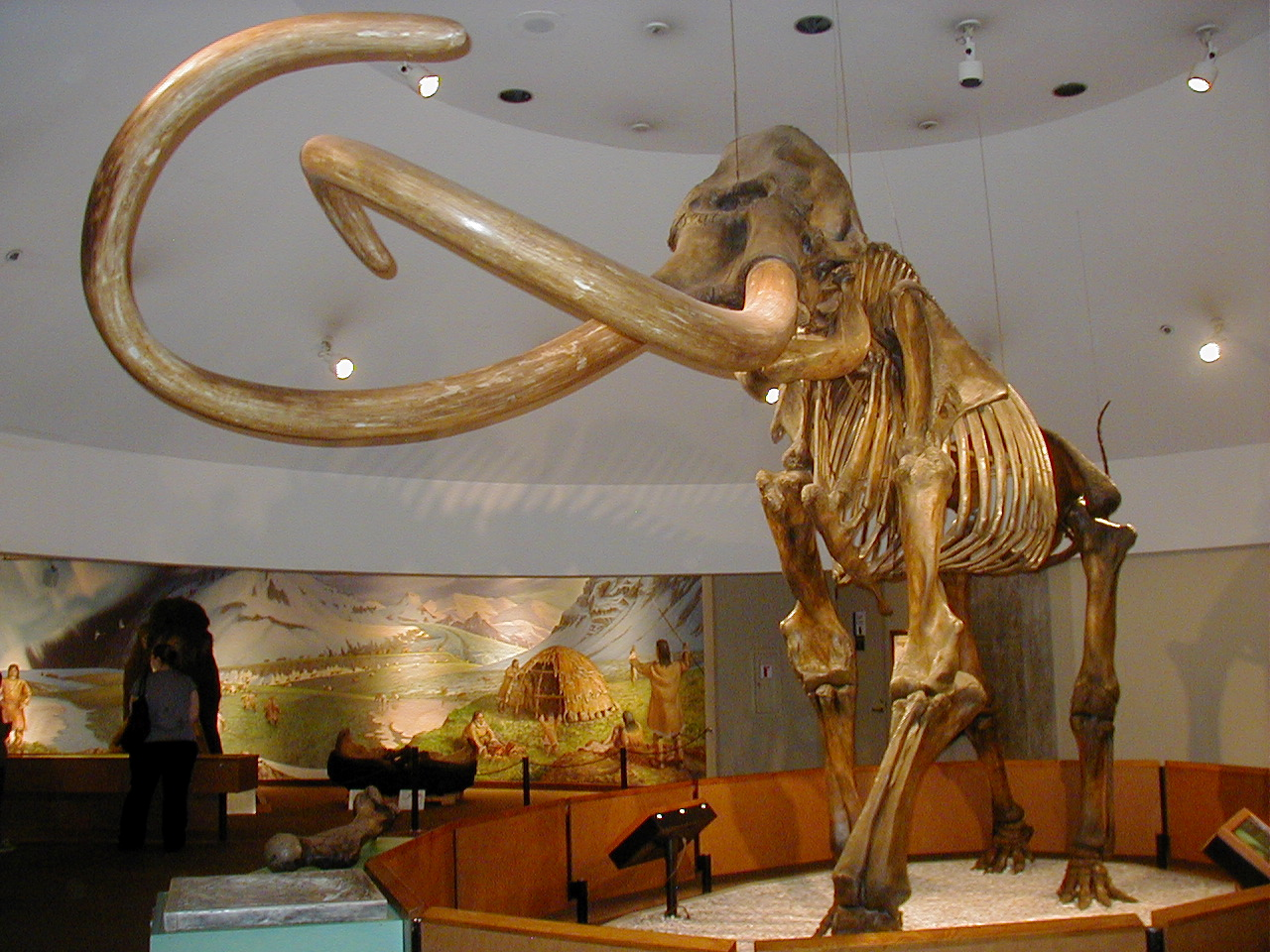
  - Mounted fossilized skeleton of a Mammuthus columbi or Columbian mammoth
    †Mammuthus columbi
- Marmota
  - †Marmota monax
- †Mazzalina
  - †Mazzalina inaurata
- Mephitis
  - †Mephitis mephitis
- Mesalia
  - †Mesalia alabamiensis
  - †Mesalia pumila
  - †Mesalia vetusta
- Microtus
  - †Microtus llanensis
  - †Microtus paroperarius
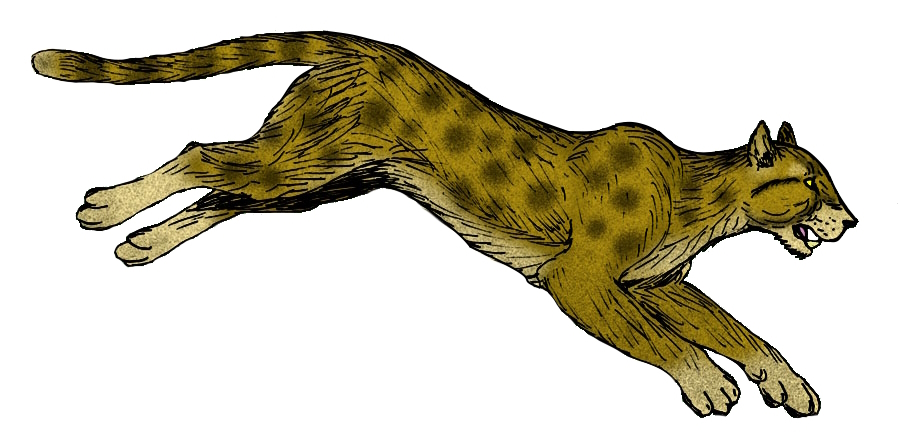
- Restoration of the Pliocene-Pleistocene Miracinonyx, or American cheetah
  †Miracinonyx
  - †Miracinonyx studeri
- Mustela
  - †Mustela richardsonii
- Myliobatis
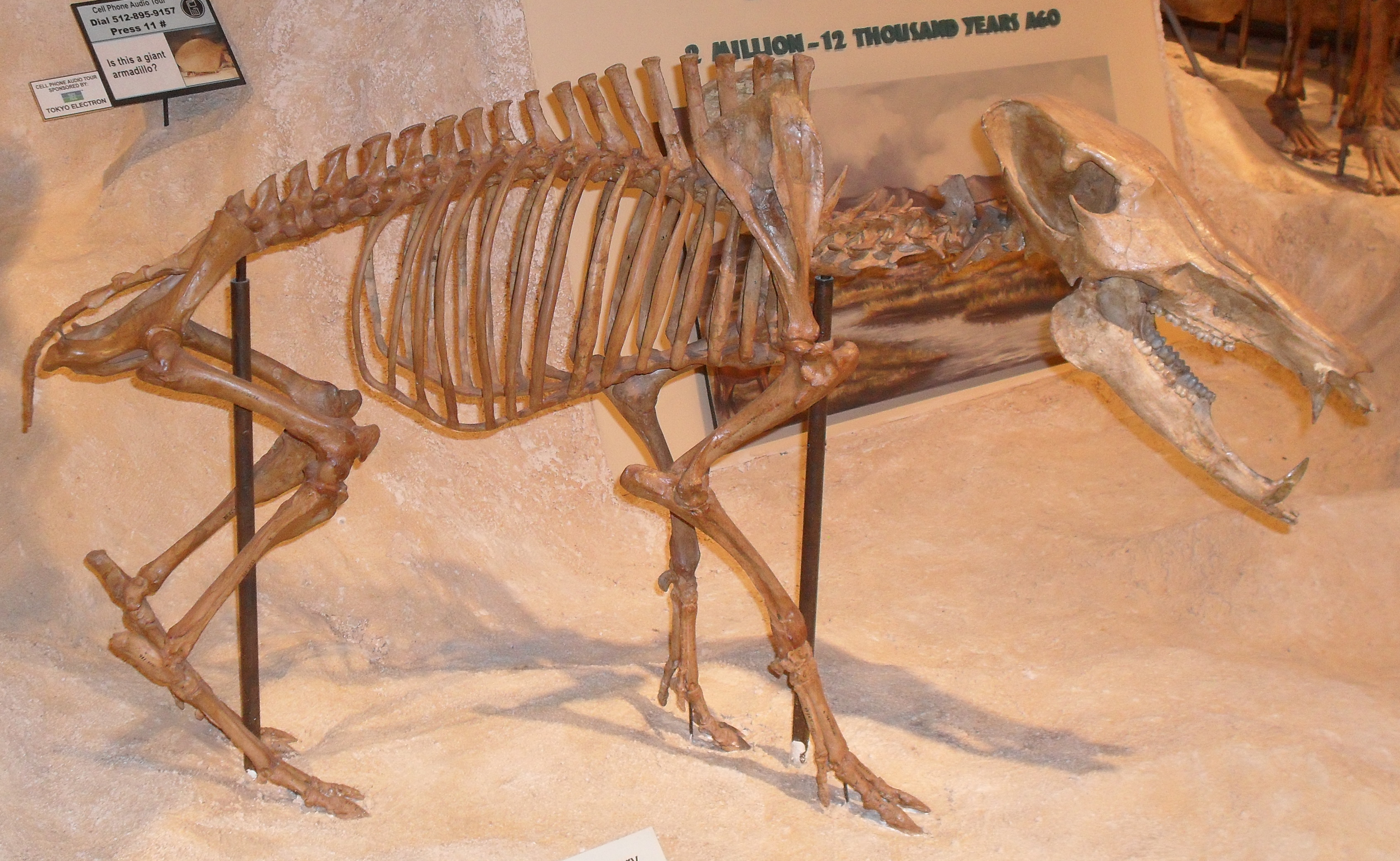
- Fossilized skeleton of the Pliocene-Holocene peccary Mylohyus
  †Mylohyus
  - †Mylohyus fossilis
- Myotis
  - †Myotis leibi
- Myrtea
  - †Myrtea curta
- Mytilus
  - †Mytilus hamatoides

== N ==
- Nassarius
  - †Nassarius albirupina
  - †Nassarius hilli
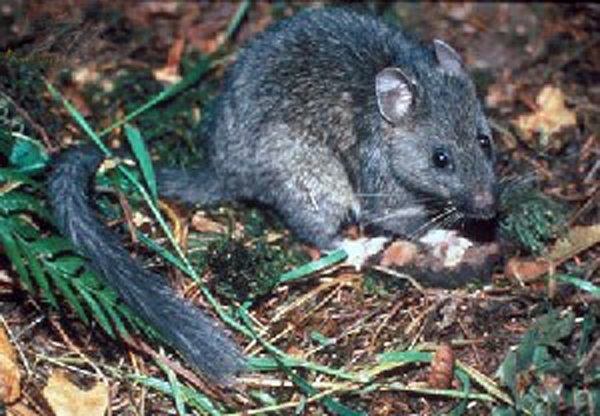
- A living Neotoma, or pack rat
  Neotoma
  - †Neotoma ozarkensis
- Neogale
  - †Neogale frenata
  - †Neogale vison
- Nucula
  - †Nucula magnifica

== O ==
- Odocoileus
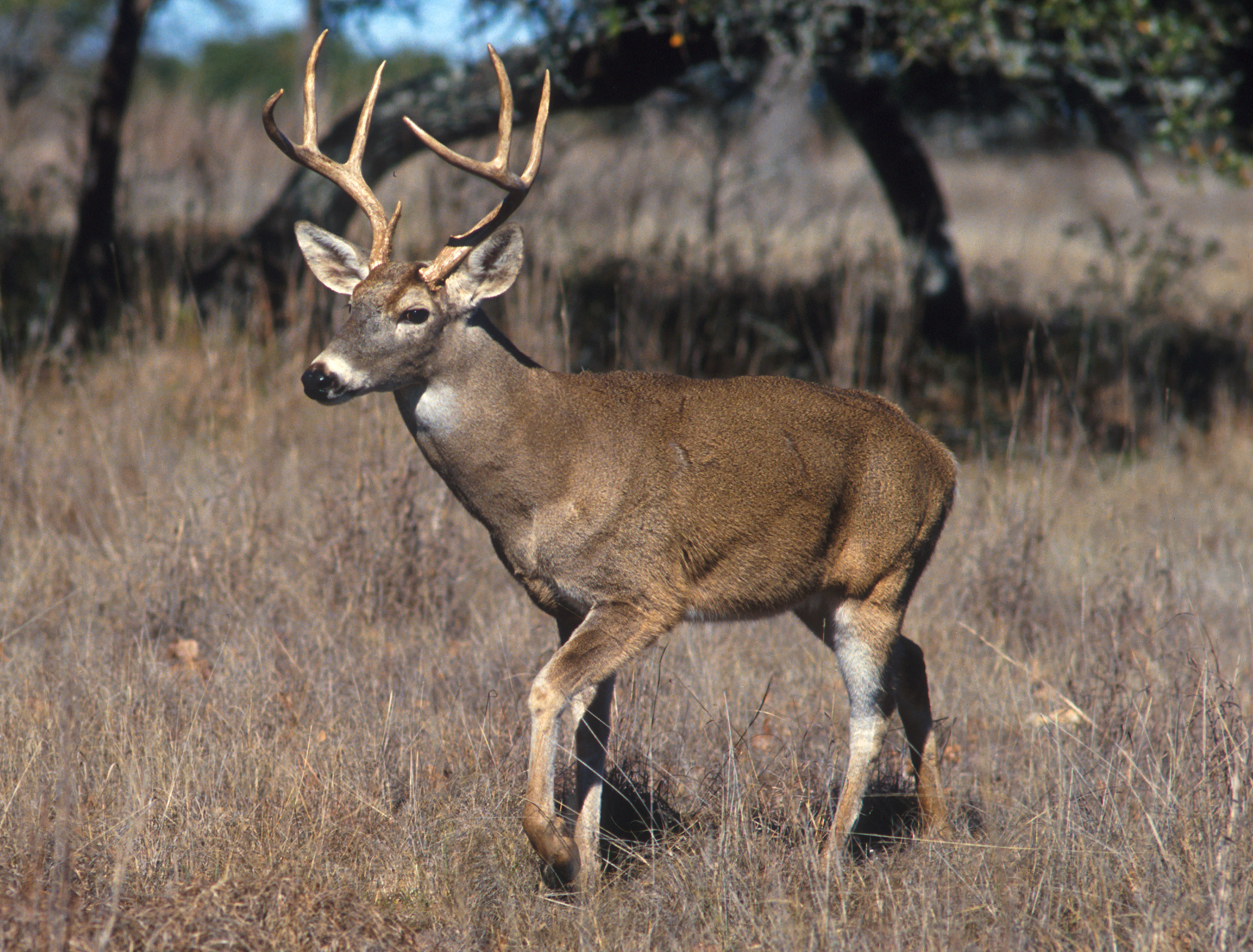
  - A living Odocoileus virginianus, or white-tailed deer
    †Odocoileus virginianus
- Ondatra
  - †Ondatra annectens
- Orthoyoldia
  - †Orthoyoldia psammotaea
  - †Orthoyoldia rubamnis
- Ostrea
  - †Ostrea crenulimarginata
  - †Ostrea pulaskensis
- †Otiorhynchites
  - †Otiorhynchites wilcoxianus – type locality for species

== P ==
- †Pachecoa
  - †Pachecoa corvamnis
- Panthera
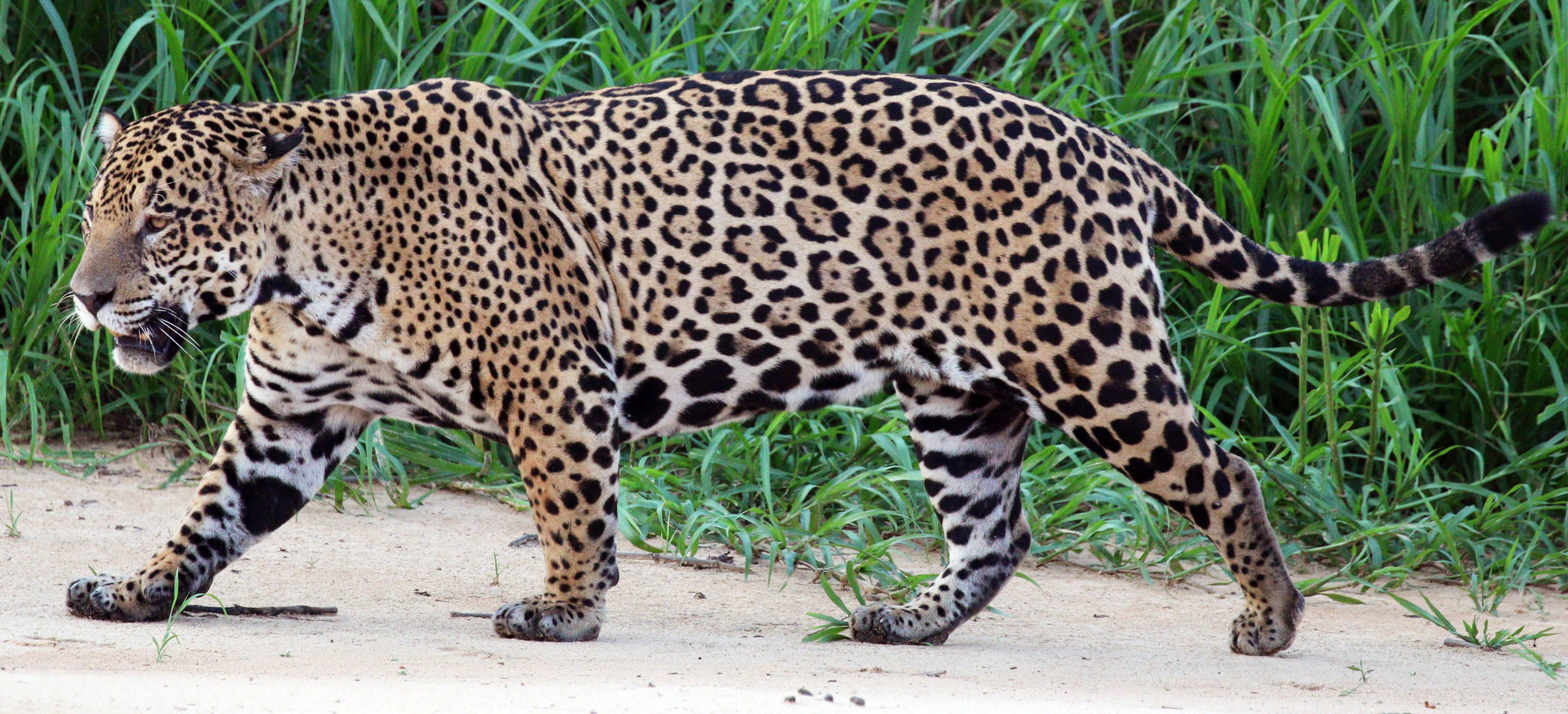
  - A living Panthera onca, or jaguar
    †Panthera onca
- †Pantolestes – or unidentified comparable form
  - †Pantolestes natans
- †Papillina
  - †Papillina dumosa
- Pekania
  - †Pekania diluviana
- Periploma
  - †Periploma collardi
- Peromyscus
- Pitar
  - †Pitar securiformis
  - †Pitar trigoniata
- Pituophis
- Pitymys
  - †Pitymys cumberlandensis
- Pleuromeris
  - †Pleuromeris parva
- Polinices
  - †Polinices eminulus
  - †Polinices weisbordi
- †Priscoficus
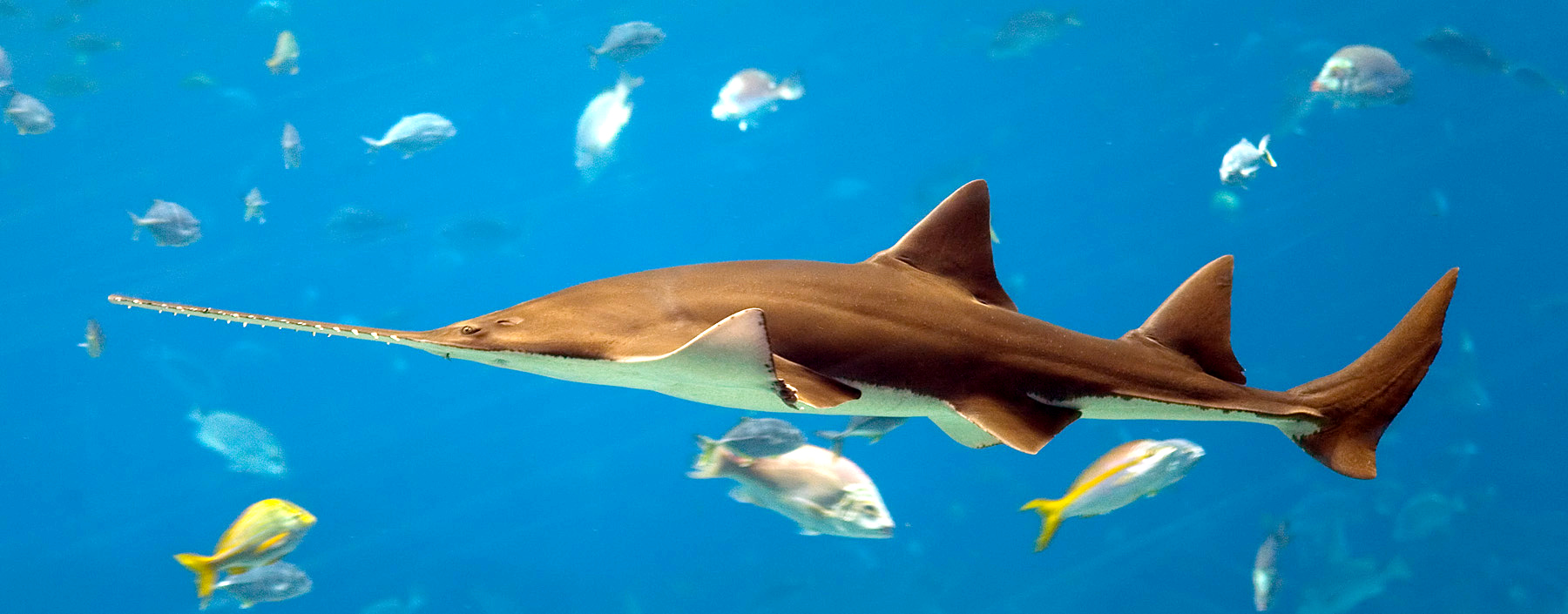
- A living Pristis sawfish
  Pristis
- Procyon
  - †Procyon lotor
- Propeamussium
  - †Propeamussium alabamense
- †Propristis
  - †Propristis schweinfurthi
- †Protocardia – report made of unidentified related form or using admittedly obsolete nomenclature
- †Protrechina – type locality for genus
  - †Protrechina carpenteri – type locality for species
- Pseudoliva
  - †Pseudoliva vetusta
- †Pterosphenus
  - †Pterosphenus schucherti

== R ==
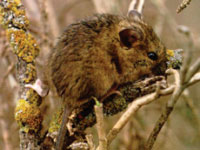
- A living Reithrodontomys, or groove-toothed New World harvest mouse
  Reithrodontomys
- Retusa
  - †Retusa jacksonensis
- †Ringicardium
  - †Ringicardium harrisi

== S ==
- Scalopus
  - †Scalopus aquaticus
- †Sinistrella
  - †Sinistrella americana
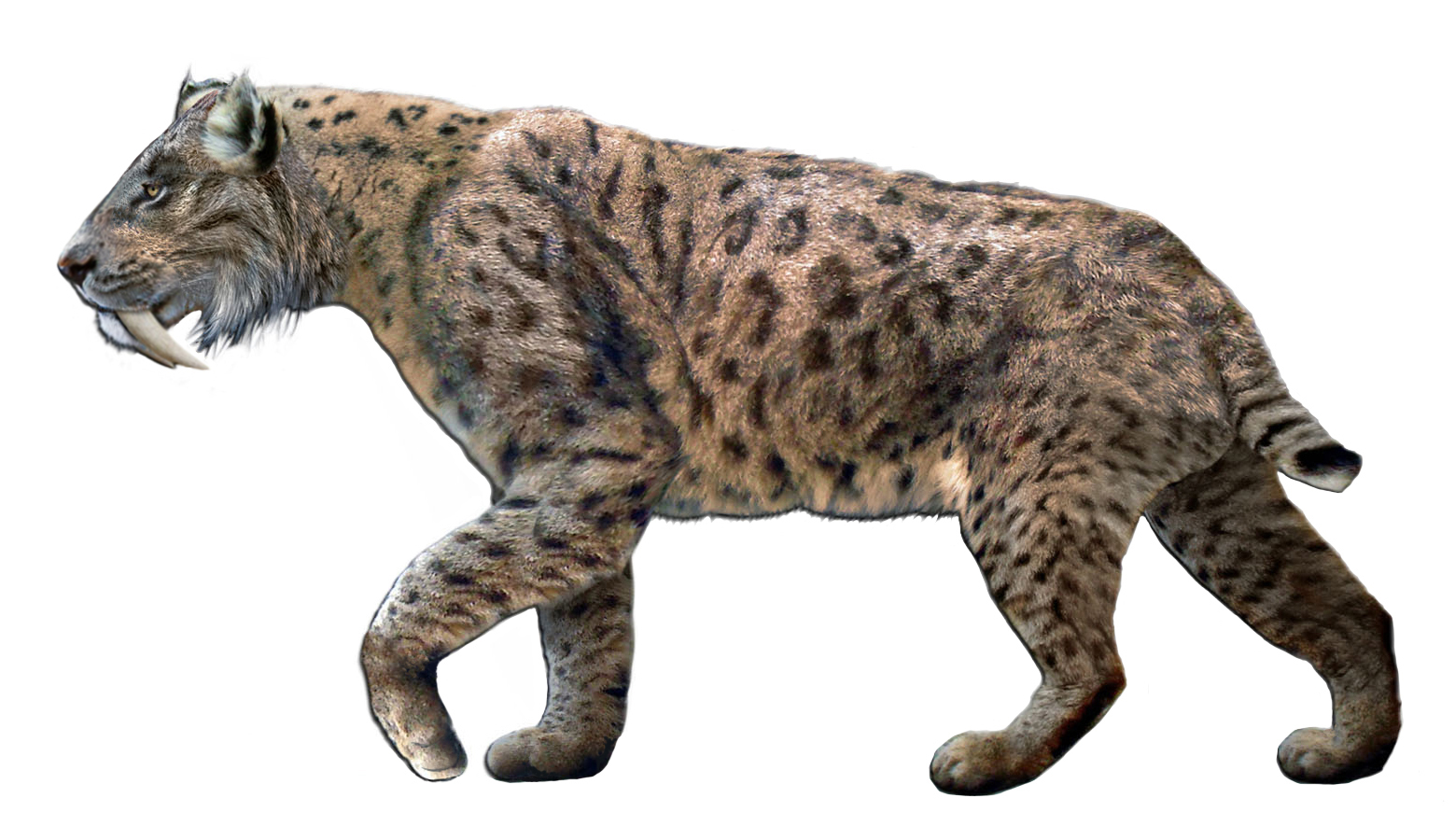
- Life restoration of the Pleistocene-Holocene saber-tooth cat Smilodon
  †Smilodon
  - †Smilodon fatalis
- Sorex
  - †Sorex cinereus
  - †Sorex fumeus
  - †Sorex minutus
  - †Sorex monticolus
- Spermophilus
  - †Spermophilus tridecemlineatus – tentative report
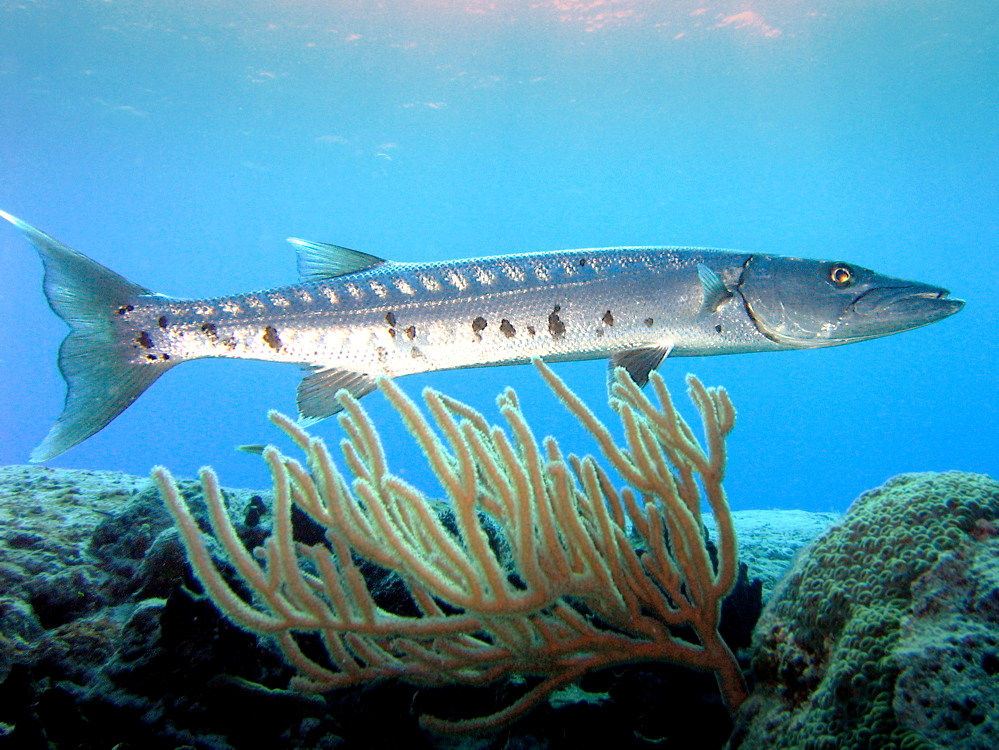
- A living Sphyraena, or barracuda
  Sphyraena
- Spilogale
  - †Spilogale putorius – tentative report
- Spisula
  - †Spisula albirupina
- Sylvilagus
  - †Sylvilagus floridanus – tentative report

== T ==
- Tamiasciurus
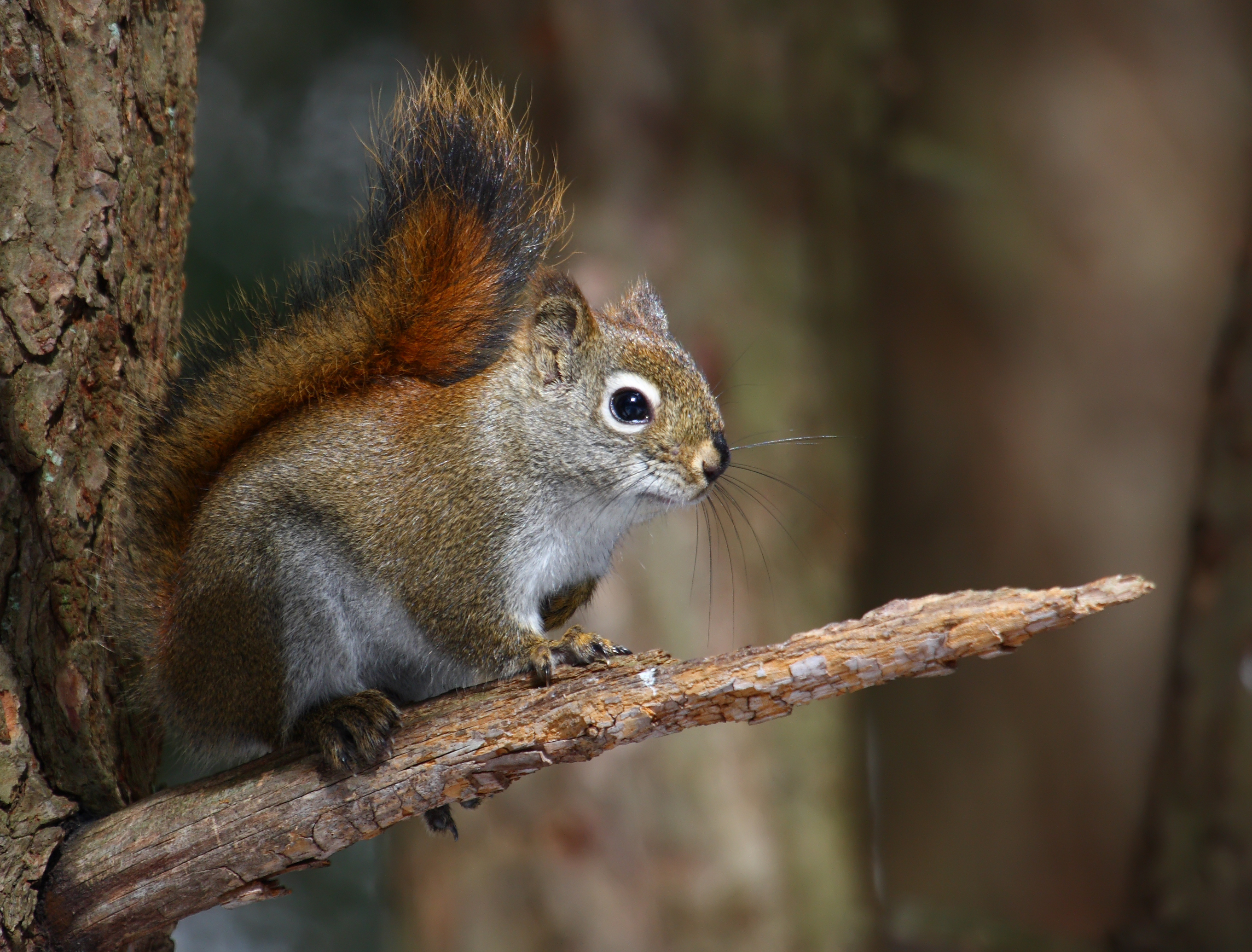
  - A living Tamiasciurus hudsonicus, or American red squirrel
    †Tamiasciurus hudsonicus
- Terebra
  - †Terebra jacksonensis
- Teredo
- Trichiurus
- †Tritonatractus
  - †Tritonatractus pearlensis
- Turritella
  - †Turritella clevelandia

== U ==
- Urocyon
  - †Urocyon cinereoargenteus
- Ursus
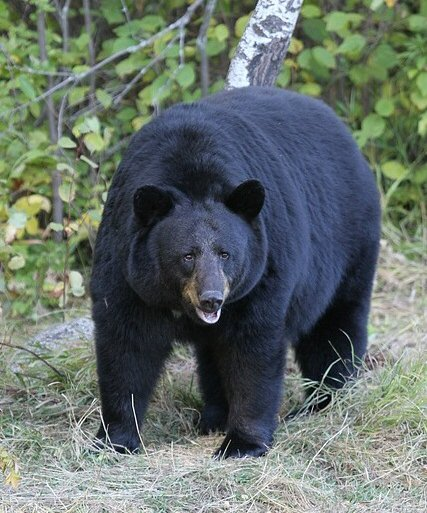
  - A living Ursus americanus, or American black bear
    †Ursus americanus

== V ==
- Venericardia
  - †Venericardia diversidentata
  - †Venericardia klimacodes
  - †Venericardia planicosta
  - †Venericardia praecisa
- Vulpes

== Y ==
- Yoldia
  - †Yoldia mater
