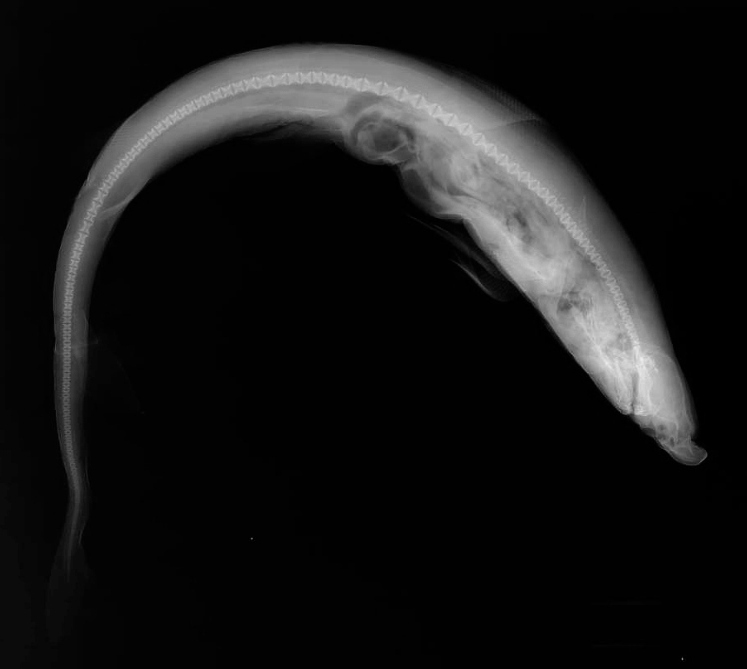
- X-ray image of Paragaleus pectoralis

Conservation status
- Endangered (IUCN 3.1)

Scientific classification
- Kingdom: Animalia
- Phylum: Chordata
- Class: Chondrichthyes
- Subclass: Elasmobranchii
- Division: Selachii
- Order: Carcharhiniformes
- Family: Hemigaleidae
- Genus: Paragaleus
- Species: P. pectoralis

Binomial name
- Paragaleus pectoralis (Garman, 1906)
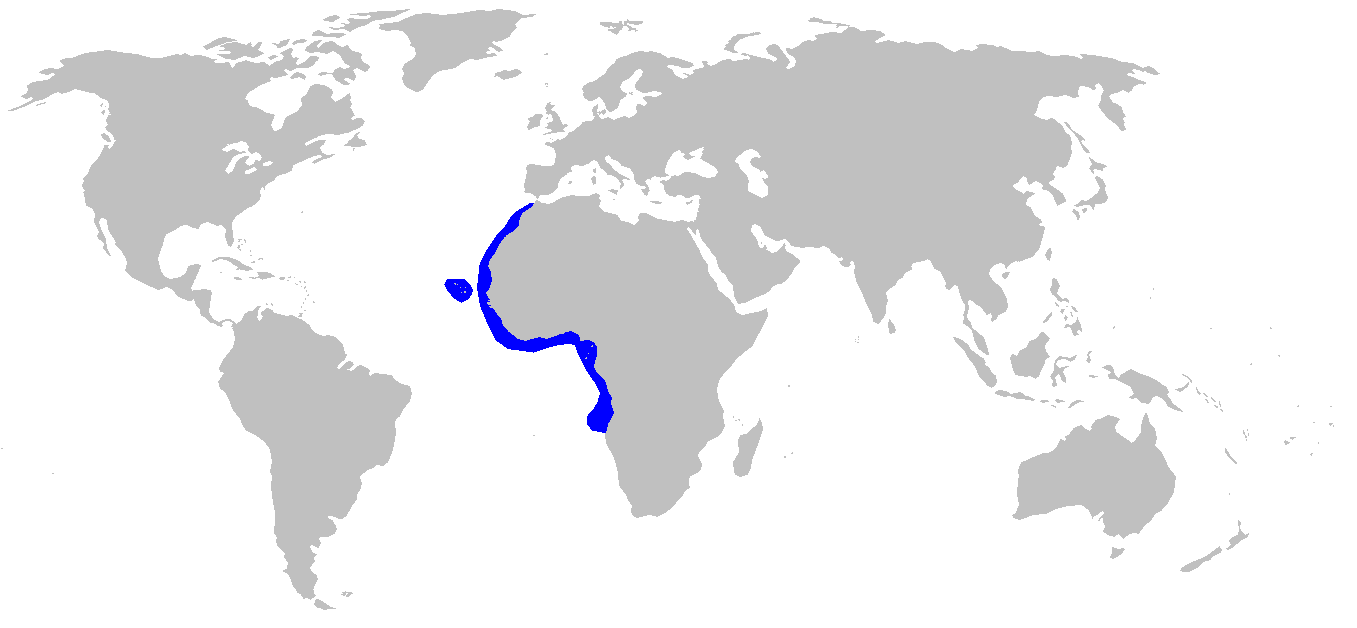

Synonyms
- Hemigaleus pectoralis Garman, 1906; Paragaleus gruveli Budker, 1935

= Atlantic weasel shark =

Species of shark

The Atlantic weasel shark (Paragaleus pectoralis) is a weasel shark of the family Hemigaleidae, found in the eastern Atlantic Ocean. Also known as the little tiger shark, it is the only species of the genus Paragaleus to have been recorded off the western coast of Africa. It is one of four species of small sharks within the carcharhinoid genus Paragaleus, including Paragaleus leucolomatus (whitetip weasel shark), Paragaleus tengi (straight-tooth weasel shark), and Paragaleus randalli (slender weasel shark). It also one of eight species within the weasel shark family, Hemigaleidae. It is currently considered by the International Union for Conservation of Nature (IUCN) as Endangered.

== Appearance and morphology ==
This particular species of weasel shark is slender with a moderately long snout, large eyes, and a short and small mouth. It has small, serrated upper teeth and erect-cusped lower teeth. It is identified by its light grey color and longitudinal yellow stripes on the sides of the body. Of its two dorsal fins, the first fin, located in front of the pelvic fins, is larger than the second. In addition, it has asymmetric caudal fins with precaudal pits.

== Range and habitat ==
Common inshore and offshore along continental shelves of the eastern Atlantic, it can be found close to land in the surf zone from Mauritania to Angola. It is also commonly found in tropical to warm-temperate waters around the Cape Verde Islands, reaching depths of 100 m (330 ft). It has been found in the following countries: Angola, Benin, Cameroon, Cape Verde, Congo, Côte d'Ivoire, Equatorial Guinea, Gabon, Gambia, Ghana, Guinea, Guinea-Bissau, Liberia, Mauritania, Nigeria, Senegal, Sierra Leone, and Togo. However, its presence has also been recorded on one occasion off the east coast of the United States, close to New England.

== Size and life cycle ==
One of the smaller species of shark, the largest recorded adult Atlantic weasel shark measured only 138 cm (4.53 ft) and weighed 11 kg (24 lb), which is believed to be their maximum size. Feeding primarily on cephalopods, including squid and octopuses, it displays slow growth rates as well as late maturity in their lifespan. This shark is considered as a specialist feeder, preying on small bony fishes including soles and sardines in addition to cephalopods. Mating season for this species occurs from March to May, while offspring are released from May to June. These sharks are viviparous and give birth to live young which develop inside the parent's body with a yolk-sac placenta. It gives birth to 1 to 4 pups per litter, averaging in 47 cm (19 in) in length. While males mature at 80 cm (31 in) in length, females may mature between 75 and 90 cm (30 and 35 in) in length.

== Relationship with humans ==
Atlantic weasel sharks are a common catch of small commercial fisheries in the eastern Atlantic and are mostly captured during spring and summer in fishing sites along the coast of Senegal. Atlantic weasel sharks are caught using a variety of fishing gear, such as longlines, hook and line, gillnets, and bottom trawls. As such, their meat is used either fresh or dried for human consumption and also processed into fishmeal. At the moment, there are no conservation efforts in place to protect this species because catch levels are neither quantified nor monitored.
