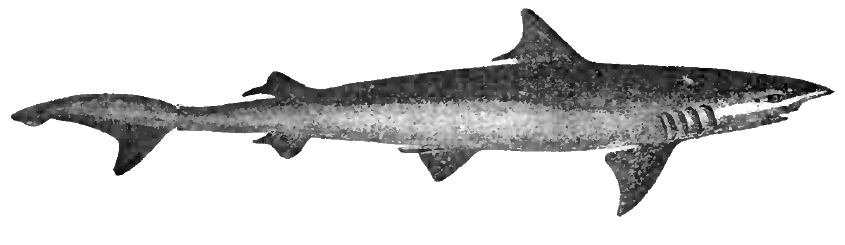

Conservation status
- Vulnerable (IUCN 3.1)

Scientific classification
- Kingdom: Animalia
- Phylum: Chordata
- Class: Chondrichthyes
- Subclass: Elasmobranchii
- Division: Selachii
- Order: Carcharhiniformes
- Family: Hemigaleidae
- Genus: Chaenogaleus
- Species: C. macrostoma

Binomial name
- Chaenogaleus macrostoma (Bleeker, 1852)
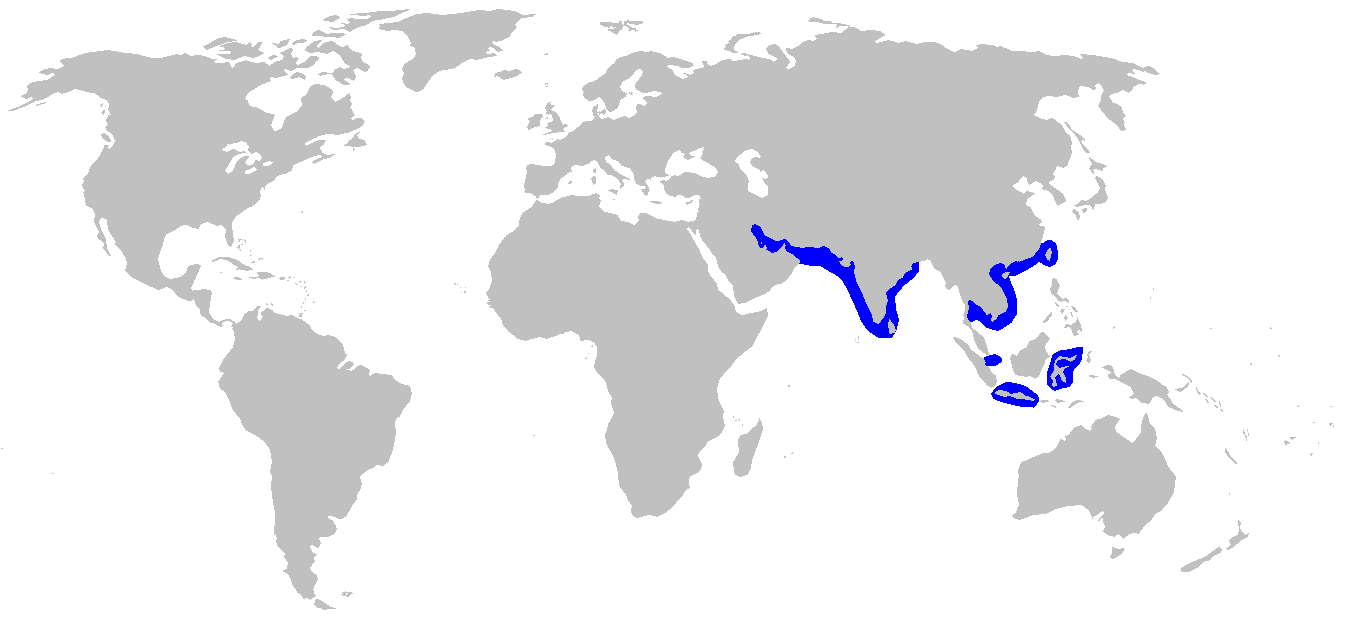

= Hooktooth shark =

Hooktooth shark Temporal range: 23–0 Ma Early Miocene to Present

Species of shark

The hooktooth shark (Chaenogaleus macrostoma), is a weasel shark of the family Hemigaleidae, the only extant member of the genus Chaenogaleus, but there is an extinct species, Chaenogaleus affinis. The hooktooth shark is found in the tropical Indo-West Pacific oceans between latitudes 30° N and 10° S, including the Persian Gulf, Pakistan, India, Sri Lanka, Singapore, Thailand, Vietnam, China, Taiwan, and Java and Sulawesi in Indonesia, from the surface to a depth of 59 meters (194 ft). It can reach a length of 1 meter (3 ft 3 in). It is considered a vulnerable species. The Hooktooth shark's prey items are small fishes, cephalopods, and crustaceans.

== See also ==
- List of prehistoric cartilaginous fish genera
