= Hemipristis tanakai =

Hemipristis tanakai Temporal range: Early Oligocene

Scientific classification
- Kingdom: Animalia
- Phylum: Chordata
- Class: Chondrichthyes
- Subclass: Elasmobranchii
- Division: Selachii
- Order: Carcharhiniformes
- Family: Hemigaleidae
- Genus: Hemipristis
- Species: †H. tanakai

Binomial name
- †Hemipristis tanakai Tomita et al., 2023

Extinct species of shark

Hemipristis tanakai is an extinct species of Hemipristis that lived during the Rupelian stage of the Oligocene epoch.

== Distribution ==
Hemipristis tanakai is known from the Yamaga Formation of northern Kyushu, Japan.
