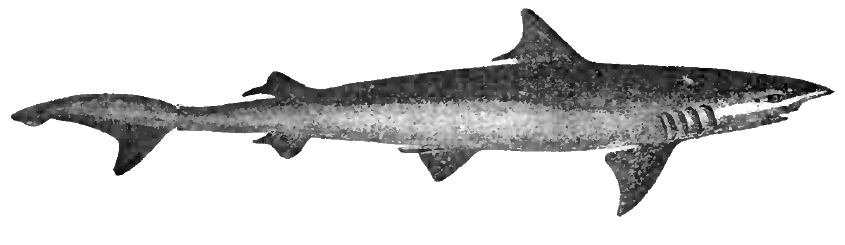
- Hooktooth shark (Chaenogaleus macrostoma)

Scientific classification
- Domain: Eukaryota
- Kingdom: Animalia
- Phylum: Chordata
- Class: Chondrichthyes
- Subclass: Elasmobranchii
- Division: Selachii
- Order: Carcharhiniformes
- Family: Hemigaleidae
- Genus: Chaenogaleus; Gill, 1862

= Chaenogaleus =

Genus of sharks

Chaenogaleus is a genus of shark containing two species. Only one is extant.

- Hooktooth shark (Chaenogaleus macrostoma) (Bleeker, 1852)
- †Chaenogaleus affinis (Probst, 1879)
