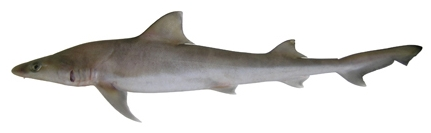

Conservation status
- Least Concern (IUCN 3.1)

Scientific classification
- Kingdom: Animalia
- Phylum: Chordata
- Class: Chondrichthyes
- Subclass: Elasmobranchii
- Division: Selachii
- Order: Carcharhiniformes
- Family: Hemigaleidae
- Genus: Hemigaleus
- Species: H. australiensis

Binomial name
- Hemigaleus australiensis W. T. White, Last & Compagno, 2005
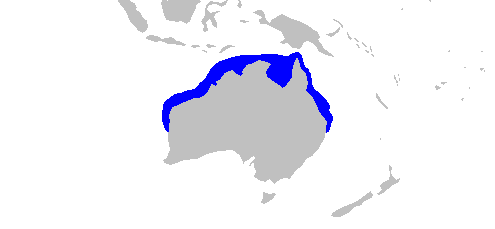
- Range of the Australian weasel shark

= Australian weasel shark =

Species of shark

The Australian weasel shark (Hemigaleus australiensis) is an uncommon species of ground shark in the family Hemigaleidae. It inhabits shallow waters off northern Australia to a depth of 170 m (560 ft); smaller sharks frequent sand and seagrass habitat and shift to coral reefs as they grow older. A slim, drab species reaching a length of 1.1 m (3.6 ft), it has sickle-shaped fins with dark tips on the second dorsal fin and caudal fin upper lobe. Its upper teeth are broad with strong serrations only on the trailing edge. The lateral line along each side is prominent and exhibits a downward curve below the second dorsal fin.

Feeding almost exclusively on octopuses and other cephalopods, the Australian weasel shark mostly hunts near the sea floor. It is viviparous, with the developing embryos nourished through a placental connection and born after a six-month gestation period. This species is productive for a shark, with females bearing litters of 1–19 pups usually twice per year. The Australian weasel shark is caught by trawl and to a lesser extent gillnet and longline fisheries, though not in such numbers that its population is threatened. Thus, it has been listed as Least Concern by the International Union for Conservation of Nature (IUCN).

== Taxonomy ==
Originally regarded as conspecific with the sicklefin weasel shark (H. microstoma), the Australian weasel shark was first documented as a potentially distinct species by John Stevens and Glen Cuthbert in 1983. Its scientific description was authored by William White, Peter Last, and Leonard Compagno in a 2005 volume of the scientific journal Zootaxa. They gave it the specific epithet australiensis on the basis of its range, and designated as the type specimen an adult male 92 cm (36 in) long caught at a depth of 41 m (135 ft) off Geraldton, Western Australia.

== Description ==
Reaching 1.1 m (3.6 ft) in length, the Australian weasel shark has a slender, spindle-shaped body and a moderately long head with a thick, rounded snout. The large, oval eyes possess nictitating membranes and have notched posterior rims. Tiny spiracles are located behind and above the eyes. The large nostrils are preceded by fairly long, triangular flaps of skin. The short, curved mouth bears prominent furrows at the corners. There are 28–30 upper and 46–52 lower tooth rows, which are not visible when the mouth is closed; the upper teeth are broad and angled with large serrations on the trailing edge only, whereas the lower teeth are thin and upright with smooth edges. There are five pairs of fairly short gill slits.

All of the fins, particularly the narrow pectoral fins, are falcate (sickle-shaped) to some degree. The medium-sized first dorsal fin originates just behind the pectoral fin rear tips. The second dorsal fin is about two-thirds as tall as the first, and there is no midline ridge running between them. The pelvic fins are broad and slightly larger than the anal fin. The anal fin has a strong notch in the trailing margin and is positioned slightly behind the second dorsal fin. The caudal peduncle bears a crescent-shaped notch at the upper origin of the caudal fin. The asymmetrical caudal fin has a well-developed lower lobe and a long, narrow upper lobe with a ventral notch near the tip. The prominent lateral line curves downward below the second dorsal fin. The skin is densely covered by small, overlapping dermal denticles; each bears five horizontal ridges leading to marginal teeth. This species is light grey to bronze above, darkening at the tips of the second dorsal fin and upper caudal fin lobe (though this may be indistinct in larger sharks), and pale below. The underside is off-white, and the first dorsal fin has a pale trailing margin.

== Distribution and habitat ==
The Australian weasel shark inhabits continental and insular shelves off northern Australia, from Geraldton in Western Australia to Brunswick Heads in New South Wales. Additional records from Papua New Guinea are as yet unconfirmed. It seems to be naturally rather uncommon. This species tends to swim close to the sea floor and can be found from inshore waters down to 170 m (560 ft) deep. Juveniles and small adults are generally found in sandy areas with seagrass cover, while large adults occur more around coral reefs.

== Biology and ecology ==
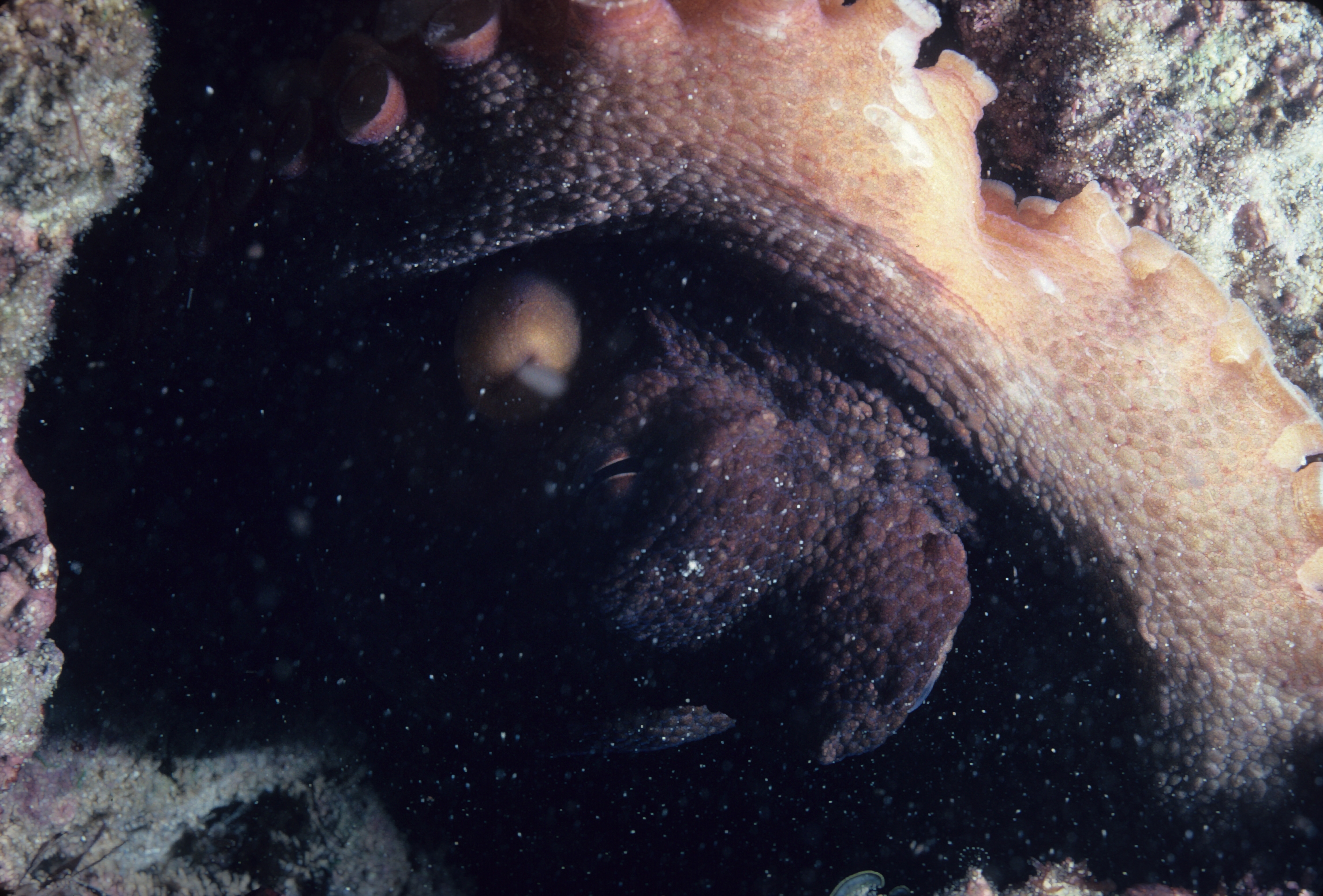
The Australian weasel shark is a specialised predator of octopuses.

The Australian weasel shark feeds predominantly on octopuses such as Callistoctopus spp., either swallowing them whole or removing the arms first. Octopuses become increasingly important to its diet with age, such that sharks over 90 cm (35 in) long eat almost nothing else; this increasing dietary specialisation is accompanied by a habitat shift toward coral reefs, which may serve to reduce competition between older and younger individuals. Bobtail squids represent a minor secondary food source, particularly for smaller sharks. In addition, other cephalopods, mud lobsters, crabs, and echinoderms are rarely consumed. This species probably hunts mostly at dawn and dusk; it typically seeks bottom-dwelling prey but will also rise into the water column if opportunity presents, such as during seasonal aggregations of broad squid (Uroteuthis etheridgei). Known parasites of the Australian weasel shark include the tapeworms Nybelinia mehlhorni, Paraorygmatobothrium kirstenae, and P. taylori, and the copepods Perissopus dentatus and Pseudopandarus australis.

Like other members of its family, the Australian weasel shark is viviparous with the developing embryos sustained through a placental connection with the mother. Mature females have a single functional ovary and two functional uteruses. The gestation period is six months long and typically two litters are produced annually, one around February and the other around September. Litter size varies from 1 to 19 pups (average 8). The embryos lose their external gills at a length of 13 cm (5.1 in), have developed colouration by a length of 23 cm (9.1 in), and are born at a length of 30 cm (12 in). Males and females reach sexual maturity at approximately 60 cm (24 in) and 65 cm (26 in) long respectively.

== Human interactions ==
Harmless to humans, the Australian weasel shark is commonly caught by prawn and fish trawlers operating off northern Australia. Smaller numbers are also captured in gillnets and on longlines. As this species has a relatively high reproductive rate and losses to fisheries are not severe enough to affect its population, it has been assessed as Least Concern by the International Union for Conservation of Nature (IUCN).
