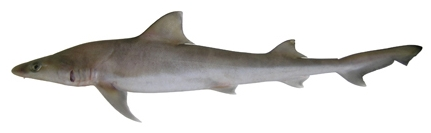
- Australian weasel shark (Hemigaleus australiensis)

Scientific classification
- Kingdom: Animalia
- Phylum: Chordata
- Class: Chondrichthyes
- Subclass: Elasmobranchii
- Division: Selachii
- Order: Carcharhiniformes
- Family: Hemigaleidae
- Genus: Hemigaleus; Bleeker, 1852

= Hemigaleus =

Genus of sharks

Hemigaleus is a genus of weasel shark in the family Hemigaleidae. It is characterized by a rounded snout and short gill slits. The mouth is short and broadly arched; the teeth have very short cusps, without toothless spaces at the jaw midlines. The dorsal and pelvic fins, and the lower caudal lobe are strongly falchate. At one time or another, this genus has encompassed up to nine species, but most were eventually split off into other genera. Neogaleus Whitley, 1931 is a junior synonym of this genus.

- Hemigaleus australiensis W. T. White, Last & Compagno, 2005 (Australian weasel shark)
- Hemigaleus microstoma Bleeker, 1852 (sicklefin weasel shark)
