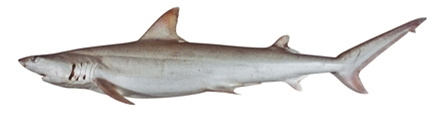

Conservation status
- Endangered (IUCN 3.1)

Scientific classification
- Kingdom: Animalia
- Phylum: Chordata
- Class: Chondrichthyes
- Subclass: Elasmobranchii
- Division: Selachii
- Order: Carcharhiniformes
- Family: Hemigaleidae
- Genus: Hemipristis
- Species: H. elongata

Binomial name
- Hemipristis elongata (Klunzinger, 1871)
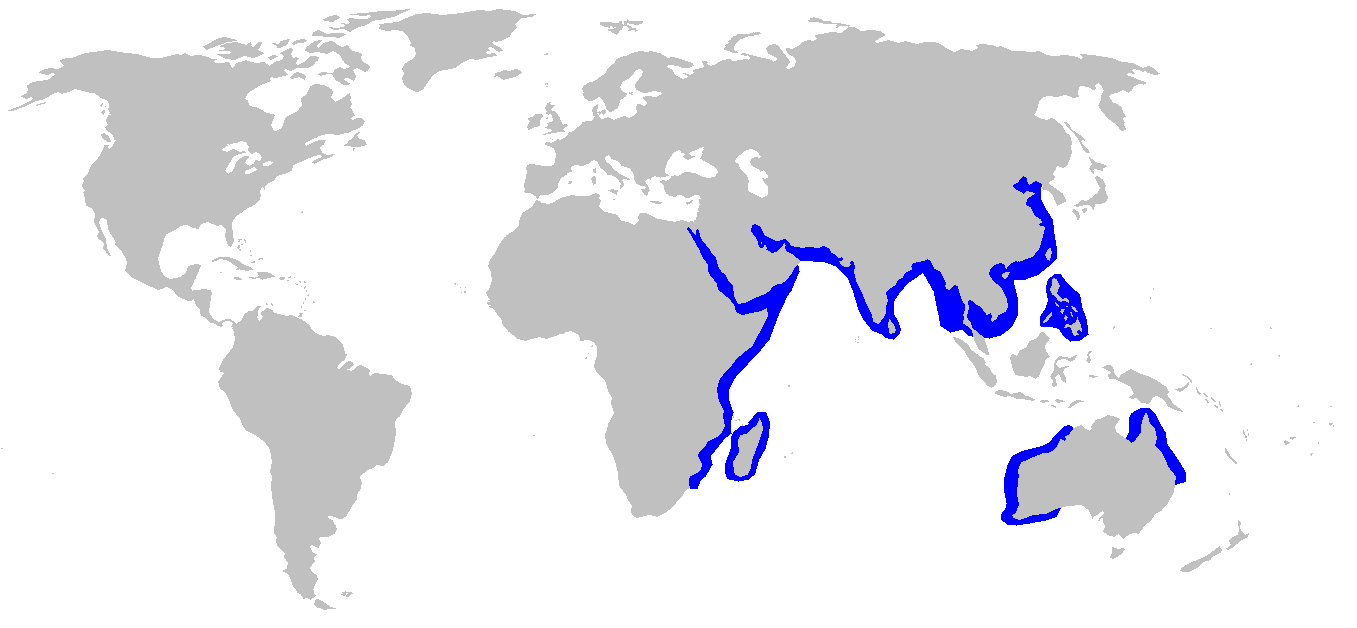
- Range of the snaggletooth shark

= Snaggletooth shark =

Species of shark

The snaggletooth shark, or fossil shark (Hemipristis elongata), is a species of weasel shark in the family Hemigaleidae, and the only extant member of the genus Hemipristis. It is found in the Indo-West Pacific, including the Red Sea, from southeast Africa to the Philippines, north to China, and south to Australia, at depths from 1 to 130 meters. This shark prefers the bottom of the water column in coastal areas, but can be found on continental and insular shelves as well. Its length is up to 240 cm (7.87 ft) .

== Anatomy ==
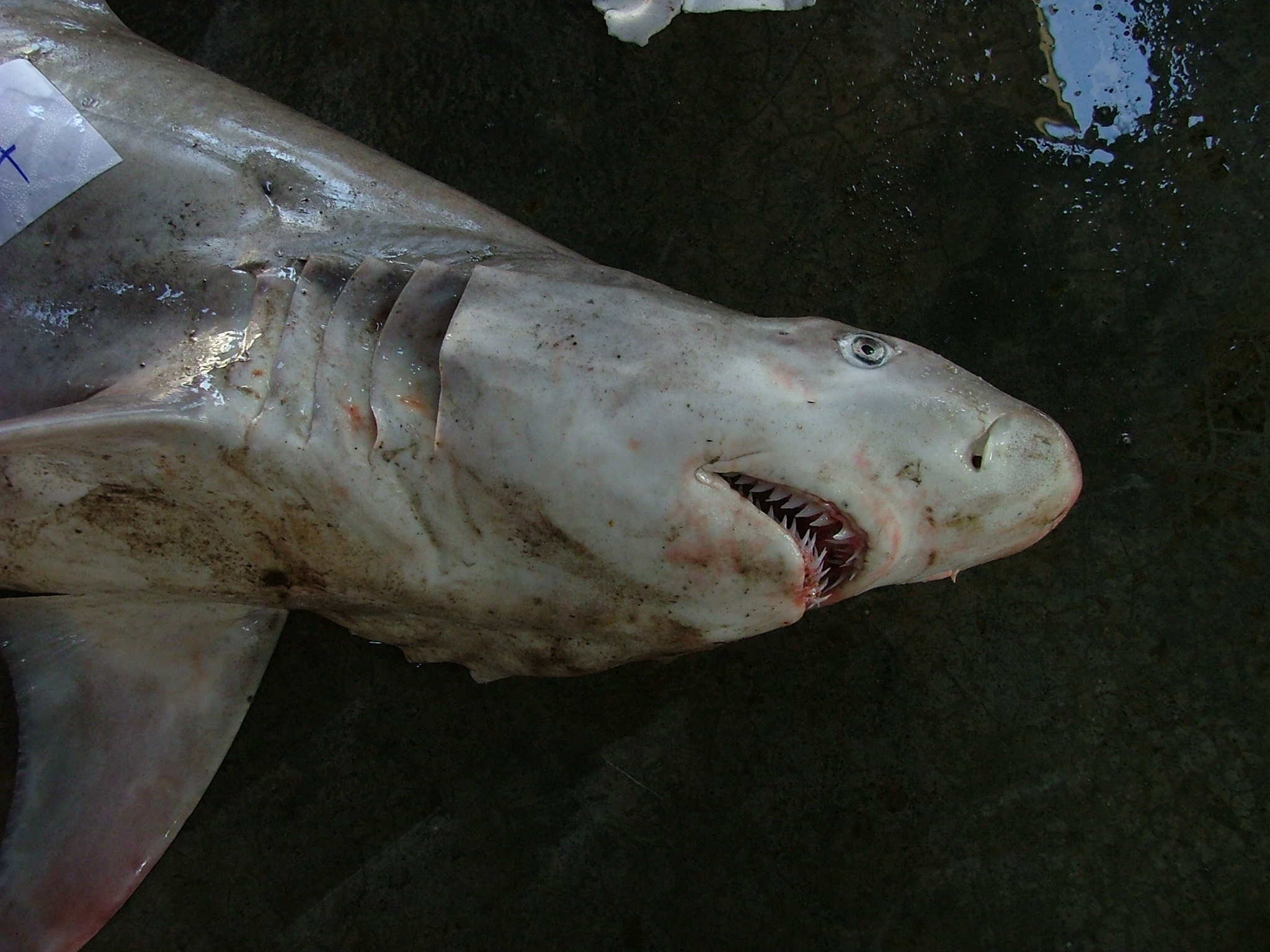
Head

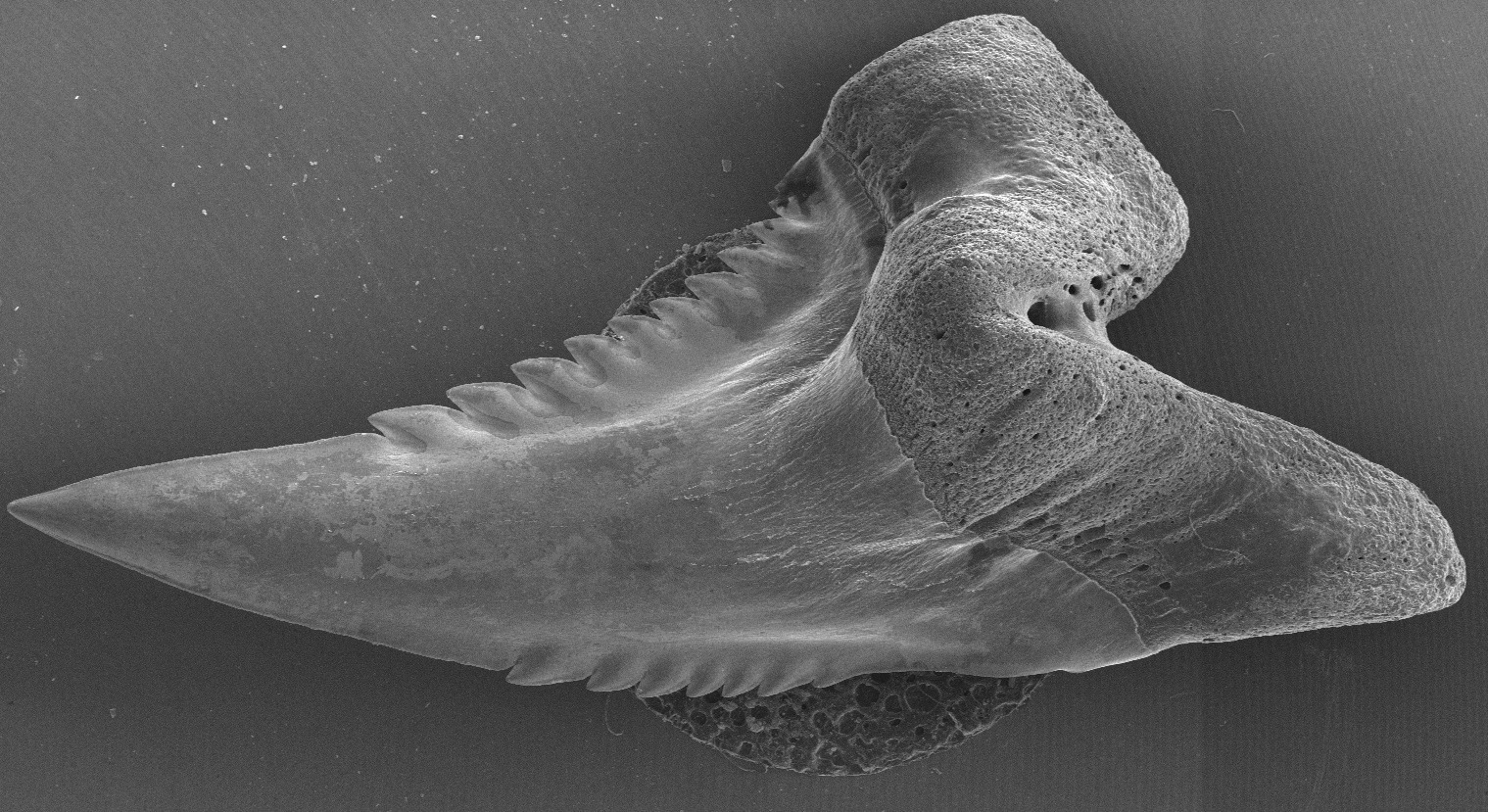
Tooth

The snaggletooth's coloration is light grey or bronze with no prominent markings. As its name suggests, it has sharp, serrated teeth on the upper jaw and hooked teeth on the bottom jaw. The shape of its body is fusiform, allowing it greater speed in the water.

Reproduction is a special kind of viviparity, called placental viviparity, where the shark carries its live young in a placenta-like structure, complete with umbilical cord. The structure is derived from the wall of the embryonic yolk sac that has fused with the uterine wall.

== Food ==
The snaggletooth shark preys on a variety of different animals, including bony fish, other sharks, rays, crabs, and cephalopods.

== Commercial uses ==
This shark is usually caught by fishing trawlers (a type of fishing boat), or by gill nets. Fins are used in the shark fin soup trade in China and other Asian countries. The meat is sold for consumption, the liver is used as a source for vitamins and the rest of the carcass is processed into fish meal.
