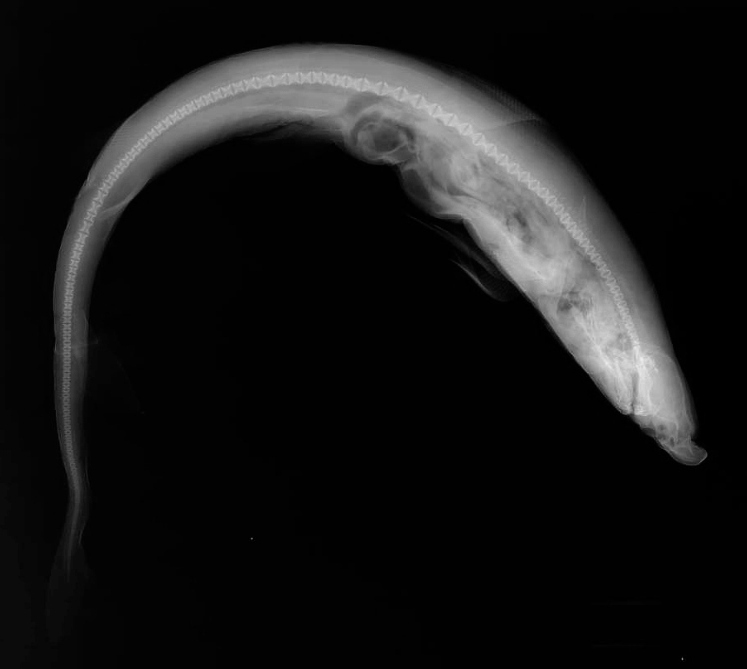
- X-ray image of Atlantic weasel shark (Paragaleus pectoralis)

Scientific classification
- Kingdom: Animalia
- Phylum: Chordata
- Class: Chondrichthyes
- Subclass: Elasmobranchii
- Division: Selachii
- Order: Carcharhiniformes
- Family: Hemigaleidae
- Genus: Paragaleus; Budker, 1935

= Paragaleus =

Genus of sharks

Paragaleus is a genus of weasel shark in the family Hemigaleidae. This genus has a rounded or slightly pointed snout, short gill slits, and a broadly arched mouth. The upper teeth have long cusps, and no toothless spaces occur at the jaw midlines. The dorsal and pelvic fins and the lower caudal lobe are not falchate in shape. Known fossil species include P. pulchellus and P. antunesi.

- Whitetip weasel shark (Paragaleus leucolomatus) Compagno & Smale, 1985 (whitetip weasel shark)
- Atlantic weasel shark (Paragaleus pectoralis) (Garman, 1906) (Atlantic weasel shark)
- Slender weasel shark (Paragaleus randalli) Compagno, Krupp & K. E. Carpenter, 1996 (slender weasel shark)
- Straight-tooth weasel shark (Paragaleus tengi) (J. S. T. F. Chen, 1963) (straight-tooth weasel shark)
