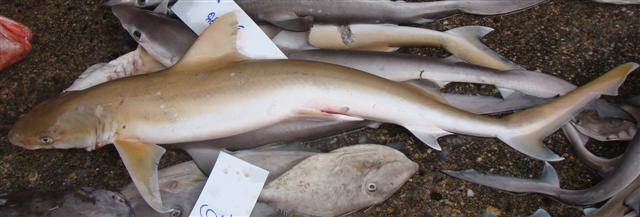

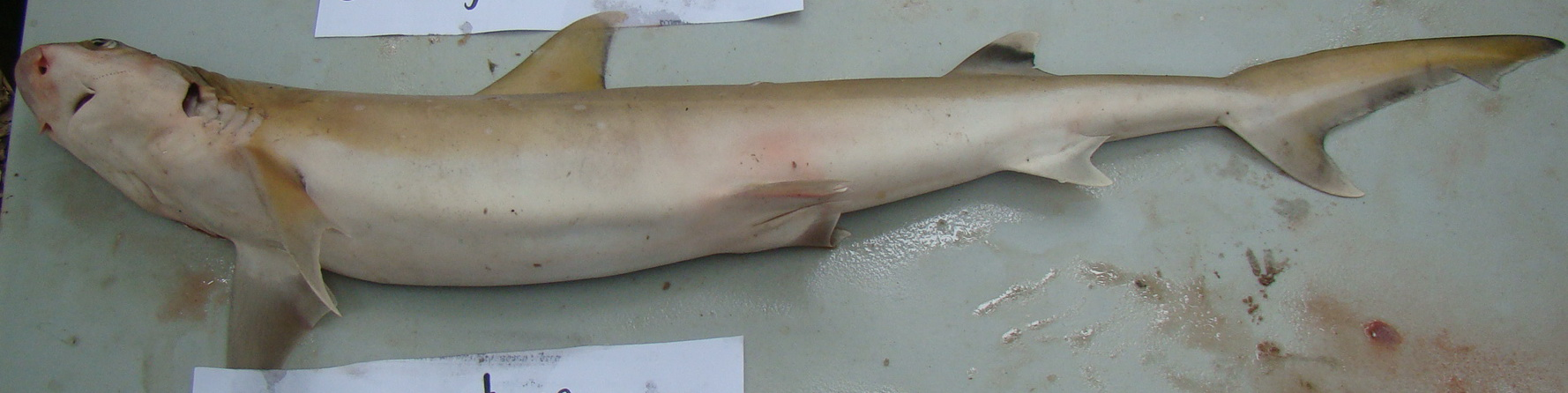

Conservation status
- Vulnerable (IUCN 3.1)

Scientific classification
- Kingdom: Animalia
- Phylum: Chordata
- Class: Chondrichthyes
- Subclass: Elasmobranchii
- Division: Selachii
- Order: Carcharhiniformes
- Family: Hemigaleidae
- Genus: Hemigaleus
- Species: H. microstoma

Binomial name
- Hemigaleus microstoma Bleeker, 1852
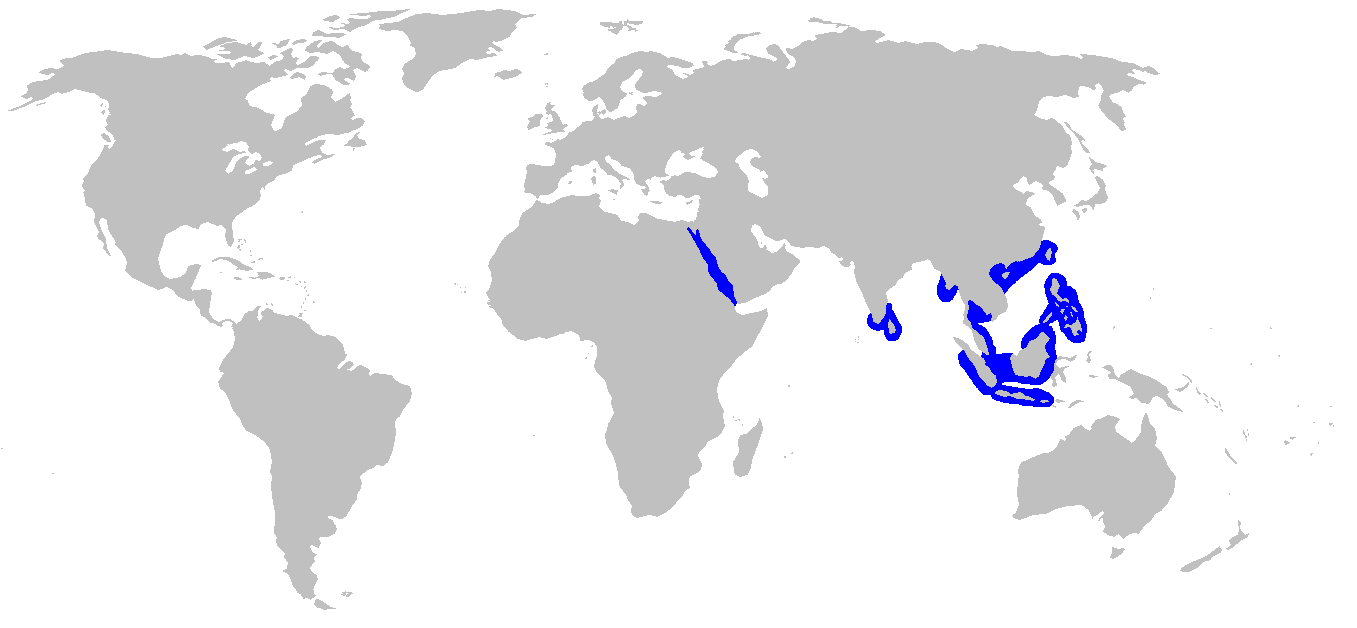
- Range of the sicklefin weasel shark

Synonyms
- ?Hemigaleus machlani Herre, 1929 ?Negogaleus brachygnathus Chu, 1960

= Sicklefin weasel shark =

Species of shark

The sicklefin weasel shark (Hemigaleus microstoma) is an uncommon species of ground shark in the family Hemigaleidae. It is native to southern India, southern China, and parts of Southeast Asia, living in shallow waters down to a depth of 170 m (560 ft). This lightly built shark is characterized by its very short mouth, broad upper teeth with serrations only on the trailing edge, and strongly sickle-shaped fins with obvious white tips on the two dorsal fins. It is light grey or bronze in colour, often with small white blotches on its sides; it reaches a maximum known length of 1.1 m (3.6 ft).

Spending most of its time close to the sea floor, the sicklefin weasel shark is a specialist predator of cephalopods. Its reproductive mode is viviparous, in which the unborn young form a placental connection to their mother. Females probably give birth twice a year, with each litter consisting of two to four pups. The sicklefin weasel shark is widely caught by artisanal fisheries and used for meat, fins, and fishmeal; its low natural abundance and reproductive rate mean that it cannot sustain much fishing pressure. Given that fishing activity is intense throughout its range, the International Union for Conservation of Nature (IUCN) has assessed this species as vulnerable.

== Taxonomy ==
Dutch ichthyologist Pieter Bleeker described the sicklefin weasel shark in 1852. He gave it the specific epithet microstoma, from the Greek mikros ("small") and stoma ("mouth"), and placed it in a new genus, Hemigaleus. His account was based on two females from Jakarta, Indonesia, measuring 63 and 70 cm (25 and 28 in) long. This species was once thought to occur off Australia, but that population is now recognised as a distinct species, H. australiensis. Yuanting Chu's 1960 description of Negogaleus brachygnathus from Chinese waters is probably of the same species as H. microstoma. Albert William Herre's 1929 description of Hemigaleus machlani from the Philippines, though lacking in detail, is also consistent with being of this species.

== Description ==
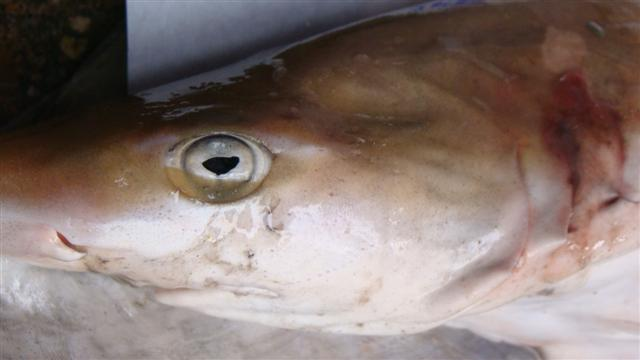
Identifying traits of the sicklefin weasel shark include its spiracle and short mouth.

The sicklefin weasel shark is a slender-bodied species reaching 1.1 m (3.6 ft) in length. The snout is fairly long and rounded, with the nostrils preceded by short flaps of skin. The large, oval eyes are equipped with nictitating membranes and are followed by minute spiracles. The mouth forms a very short, wide arch and conceals the teeth when closed. Moderately long furrows are present at the corners of the mouth. It has 25–34 upper and 37–43 lower tooth rows; the upper teeth are broad and angled with a smooth leading edge and strongly serrated trailing edge, while the lower teeth are narrow, erect, and smooth-edged. The five pairs of gill slits are short.

The fins are strongly falcate (sickle-shaped), particularly the dorsal fins, pelvic fins, and lower caudal fin lobe. The pectoral fins are narrow and pointed. The first dorsal fin is positioned about halfway between the pectoral and pelvic fins. The second dorsal fin is about two-thirds as tall as the first and is positioned slightly ahead of the anal fin. The anal fin is smaller than the second dorsal fin. The dorsal surface of the caudal peduncle bears a crescent-shaped notch at the caudal fin origin. The asymmetrical caudal fin has a well-developed lower lobe and a long upper lobe with a ventral notch near the tip. The dermal denticles are small and overlapping; each has five horizontal ridges leading to marginal teeth. This species is light grey or bronze above, often with small white spots on the sides, and pale below. The dorsal fins are tipped in white, which is especially obvious on the second dorsal as the remainder of fin is mostly dark.

== Distribution and habitat ==
The sicklefin weasel shark is found off southern India and Sri Lanka, as well as from southern China and Taiwan to Java and Borneo. It may also occur around the Philippines and in the Red Sea, though specimens from these regions need to be compared taxonomically with those from its confirmed range. It does not seem to be very common naturally. This species inhabits continental and insular shelves from inshore waters to at least a depth of 170 m (560 ft), and usually swims close to the sea floor.

== Biology and ecology ==
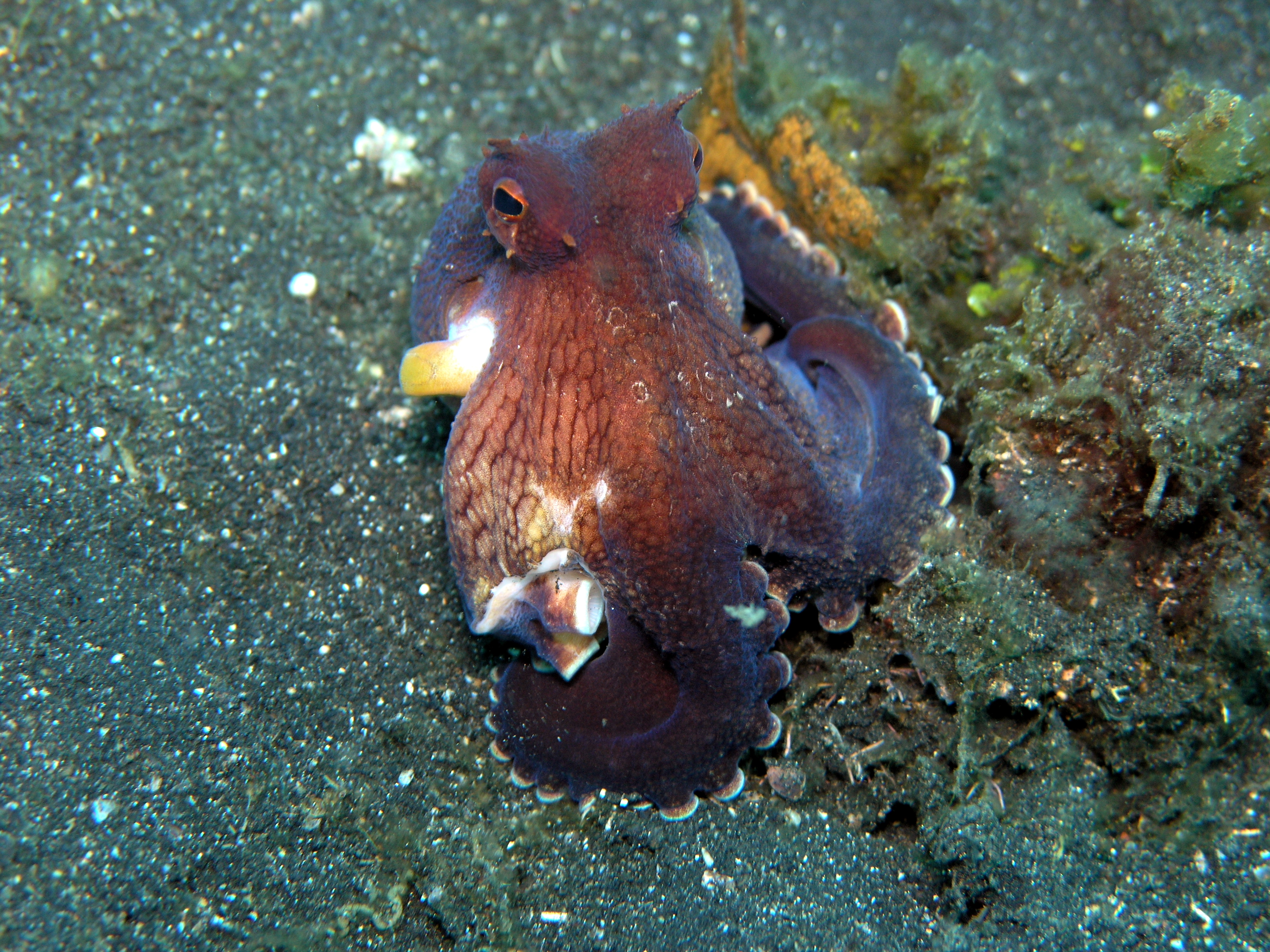
Octopuses and other cephalopods are the main prey of the sickelfin weasel shark.

The diet of the sicklefin weasel shark is composed almost entirely of cephalopods, though crustaceans and echinoderms may be infrequently eaten. Its small mouth and short gill slits may be adaptations for capturing cephalopods by suction, while its weak jaws and small teeth reflect a diet of mostly soft-bodied prey. This species is viviparous, wherein the developing embryos are sustained to term through a placental connection formed from the depleted yolk sac. Females likely produce two litters per year, implying a gestation period under six months. Between two and four pups are born at a time (average 3.3); newborns measure roughly 45 cm (18 in) long. Males mature sexually around 74–75 cm (29–30 in) long, while females mature around 75–78 cm (30–31 in) long.

== Human interactions ==
The sicklefin weasel shark is not dangerous to humans. It is caught by artisanal fishers throughout its range, mostly in drifting and bottom gillnets, but also in bottom trawls and on longlines. The meat is eaten, the fins are used in shark fin soup, and the offal is processed into fishmeal. However, the small size of this shark limits its economic value. The International Union for Conservation of Nature (IUCN) has assessed the sicklefin weasel shark as vulnerable, noting that it is naturally uncommon and resides in heavily fished regions. In addition, compared to the related Australian weasel shark, it is less productive, thus less resilient to withstand fishing pressure.
