= Straight-tooth weasel shark =

Conservation status
- Endangered (IUCN 3.1)

Scientific classification
- Kingdom: Animalia
- Phylum: Chordata
- Class: Chondrichthyes
- Subclass: Elasmobranchii
- Division: Selachii
- Order: Carcharhiniformes
- Family: Hemigaleidae
- Genus: Paragaleus
- Species: P. tengi

Binomial name
- Paragaleus tengi (J. S. T. F. Chen, 1963)
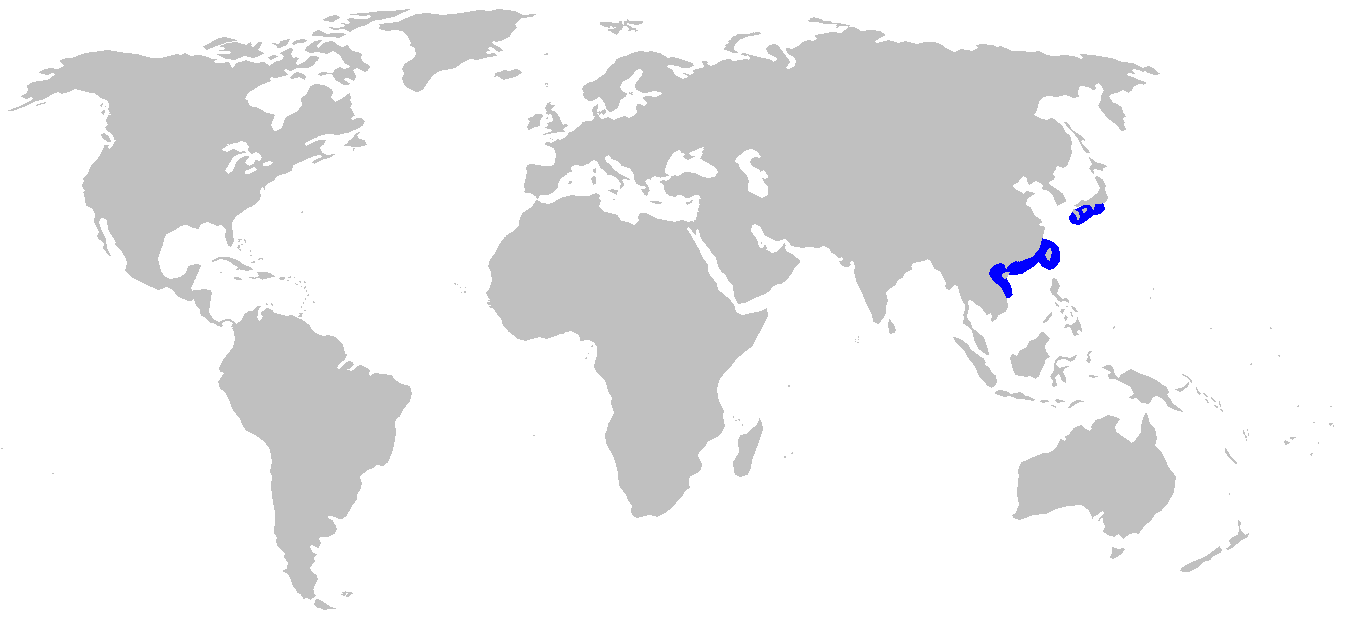

Species of shark

The straight-tooth weasel shark, Paragaleus tengi, is a weasel shark of the family Hemigaleidae, found in the tropical western Pacific Ocean. It can reach a length of 88 cm (35 in).

Paragaleus tengi is distinctive for its color and size. Specifically, its solid grey dorsal (upper) color, short snout, and 2–3 rows of lower teeth are a few of the characteristic traits that aid in distinguishing between this species of shark and others, like the Paragaleus pectoralis (White & Harris, 2013).

The reproduction of this shark is viviparous.
