= Whitetip weasel shark =

Conservation status
- Vulnerable (IUCN 3.1)

Scientific classification
- Kingdom: Animalia
- Phylum: Chordata
- Class: Chondrichthyes
- Subclass: Elasmobranchii
- Division: Selachii
- Order: Carcharhiniformes
- Family: Hemigaleidae
- Genus: Paragaleus
- Species: P. leucolomatus

Binomial name
- Paragaleus leucolomatus Compagno & Smale, 1985
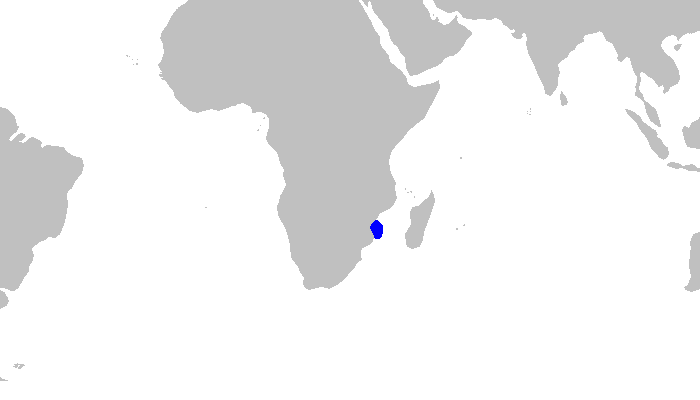

Species of shark

The whitetip weasel shark (Paragaleus leucolomatus) is a weasel shark of the family Hemigaleidae. Only one specimen, in Kosi Bay, South Africa, has been caught. That specimen was 96 cm (38 in) long. In 2020, a fuzzy image believed to be this shark was obtained on the show Extinct or Alive.

The reproduction of this shark is viviparous.
