= Chaenogaleus affinis =

Chaenogaleus affinis Temporal range: Miocene

Scientific classification
- Domain: Eukaryota
- Kingdom: Animalia
- Phylum: Chordata
- Class: Chondrichthyes
- Subclass: Elasmobranchii
- Division: Selachii
- Order: Carcharhiniformes
- Family: Hemigaleidae
- Genus: Chaenogaleus
- Species: †C. affinis

Binomial name
- †Chaenogaleus affinis (Probst, 1879)

Extinct species of shark

Chaenogaleus affinis is an extinct species of weasel shark which existed during the Miocene epoch. It was described by Josef Probst in 1879.
