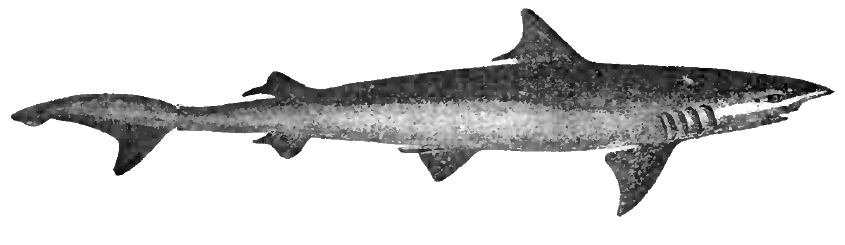
- Hooktooth shark, Chaenogaleus macrostoma

Scientific classification
- Kingdom: Animalia
- Phylum: Chordata
- Class: Chondrichthyes
- Subclass: Elasmobranchii
- Division: Selachii
- Order: Carcharhiniformes
- Suborder: Carcharhinoidei
- Family: Hemigaleidae; Compagno, 1984

Genera
- Chaenogaleus T. N. Gill, 1862; Hemigaleus (Bleeker, 1852); Hemipristis (Agassiz, 1843); Paragaleus (Budker, 1935)

= Hemigaleidae =

Family of sharks

The weasel sharks are a family, the Hemigaleidae, of ground sharks found from the eastern Atlantic Ocean to the continental Indo-Pacific. They are found in shallow coastal waters to a depth of 100 m (330 ft).

Most species are small, reaching no more than 1.4 m (4.6 ft) long, though the snaggletooth shark (Hemipristis elongatus) may reach 2.4 m (7.9 ft). They have horizontally oval eyes, small spiracles, and precaudal pits. Two dorsal fins occur with the base of the first placed well forward of the pelvic fins. The caudal fin has a strong ventral lobe and undulations on the dorsal lobe margin. They feed on a variety of small bony fishes and invertebrates; at least two species specialize on cephalopods. They are not known to have attacked people.

== Genera and species ==
The eight known species in this family are placed in four genera. Hemipristis is placed in the subfamily Hemipristinae, while Chaenogaleus, Hemigaleus, and Paragaleus are placed in the subfamily Hemigaleinae.

=== Chaenogaleus ===
This genus consists of a single species, the hooktooth shark, characterized by long, hooked teeth in the lower jaw and no toothless spaces at the midlines of the jaws. The gill slits are very long, the snout is wedge-shaped, and the fins are not falcate. Known fossil species include C. affinis.

- Chaenogaleus macrostoma (Bleeker, 1852) (hooktooth shark)

=== Hemigaleus ===
This genus is characterized by a rounded snout and short gill slits. The mouth is short and broadly arched; the teeth have very short cusps, without toothless spaces at the jaw midlines. The dorsal and pelvic fins, and the lower caudal lobe are strongly falchate. At one time or another, this genus has encompassed up to nine species, but most were eventually split off into other genera. Neogaleus Whitley, 1931 is a junior synonym of this genus.

- Hemigaleus australiensis W. T. White, Last & Compagno, 2005 (Australian weasel shark)
- Hemigaleus microstoma Bleeker, 1852 (sicklefin weasel shark)

=== Hemipristis ===
This genus contains a single extant species, the snaggletooth shark. It is distinguished by a rounded snout and very long gill slits. The mouth is long with toothless spaces at the midlines; the lower teeth have very long, strongly hooked cusps and protrude when the mouth is closed. The fins are strongly falchate. Dirrhizodon Kunzinger, 1871 and Heterogaleus Gohar & Mazhar, 1964 are junior synonyms of this genus. Several fossil species are known, including H. curvatus and H. serra; in the Tertiary, this genus had a global distribution.

- Hemipristis elongata (Klunzinger, 1871) (snaggletooth shark)

=== Paragaleus ===
This genus has a rounded or slightly pointed snout, short gill slits, and a broadly arched mouth. The upper teeth have long cusps, and no toothless spaces occur at the jaw midlines. The dorsal and pelvic fins and the lower caudal lobe are not falchate in shape. Known fossil species include P. pulchellus and P. antunesi.

- Paragaleus leucolomatus Compagno & Smale, 1985 (whitetip weasel shark)
- Paragaleus pectoralis (Garman, 1906) (Atlantic weasel shark)
- Paragaleus randalli Compagno, Krupp & K. E. Carpenter, 1996 (slender weasel shark)
- Paragaleus tengi (J. S. T. F. Chen, 1963) (straight-tooth weasel shark)
