= Hemipristis curvatus =

Hemipristis curvatus Temporal range: Eocene

Scientific classification
- Kingdom: Animalia
- Phylum: Chordata
- Class: Chondrichthyes
- Subclass: Elasmobranchii
- Division: Selachii
- Order: Carcharhiniformes
- Family: Hemigaleidae
- Genus: Hemipristis
- Species: †H. curvatus

Binomial name
- †Hemipristis curvatus (Probst, 1879)

Extinct species of shark

Hemipristis curvatus is an extinct species of weasel shark which existed during the Eocene epoch. It was described by Dames in 1883.
