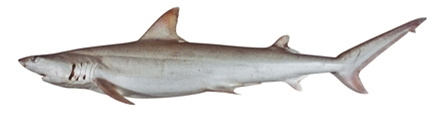
- Snaggletooth shark (H. elongata)

Scientific classification
- Kingdom: Animalia
- Phylum: Chordata
- Class: Chondrichthyes
- Subclass: Elasmobranchii
- Division: Selachii
- Order: Carcharhiniformes
- Family: Hemigaleidae
- Genus: Hemipristis; Agassiz, 1843

Type species
- Hemipristis elongata Klunzinger, 1871

= Hemipristis =

Hemipristis Temporal range: Middle Eocene–Recent

Genus of sharks

Hemipristis (from Greek: ἡμι hēmi, 'half' and Greek: πρίστης prístēs 'saw') is a genus of weasel sharks, family Hemigaleidae. It contains one extant species, the snaggletooth shark (H. elongata) and several extinct species.

Hemipristis has two distinct types of teeth in each section of its jaw. The ones on the upper jaw act as knives, cutting through the flesh of the prey, while the pointed ones on the bottom act as forks, spearing the prey and holding it down. Because this shark was poorly studied in the past and its top and bottom jaw teeth differ to such a great degree, its top and lower jaw teeth were assigned to a separate genus in the past.

== Species ==
- Hemipristis elongata (Klunzinger, 1871)
- †Hemipristis curvatus Dames, 1883
- †Hemipristis serra Agassiz, 1835 - An extinct species from the Oligocene–Miocene of Florida, South Carolina, and other areas on the Atlantic coast, and potentially the Late Middle Pleistocene of what is now Java.
- †Hemipristis tanakai Tomita et al., 2023 - Rupelian of Japan

== See also ==
- List of prehistoric cartilaginous fish
