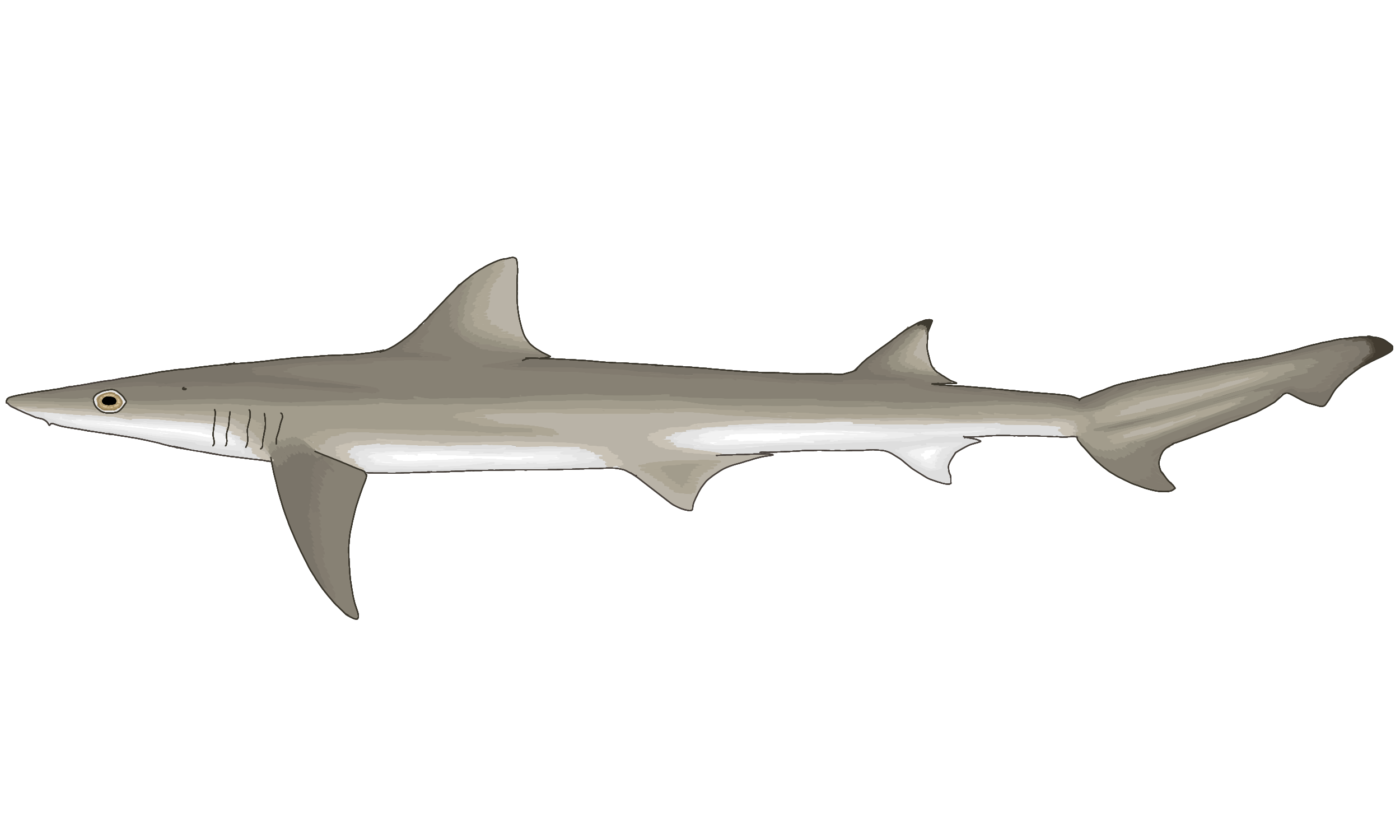

Conservation status
- Vulnerable (IUCN 3.1)

Scientific classification
- Kingdom: Animalia
- Phylum: Chordata
- Class: Chondrichthyes
- Subclass: Elasmobranchii
- Division: Selachii
- Order: Carcharhiniformes
- Family: Hemigaleidae
- Genus: Paragaleus
- Species: P. longicaudatus

Binomial name
- Paragaleus longicaudatus Bessednov, 1966
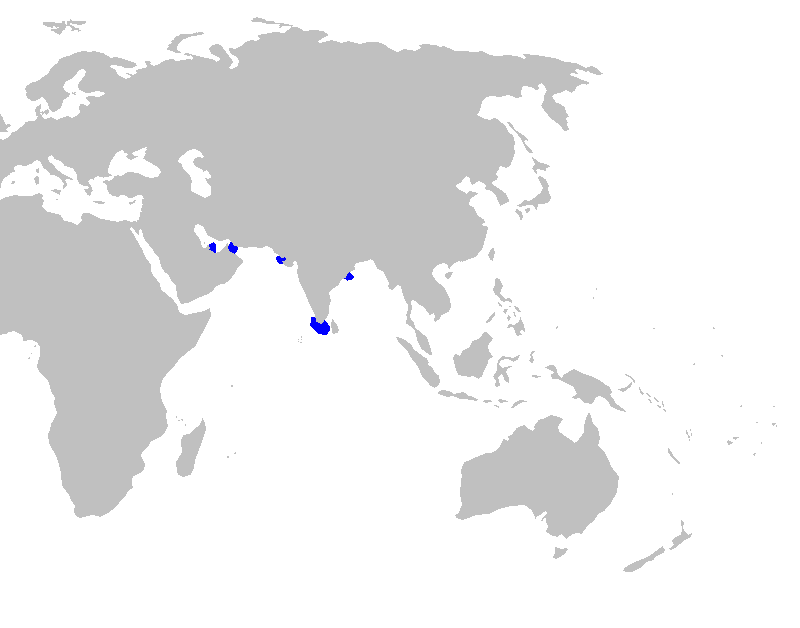

Synonyms
- Paragaleus randalli Compagno, Krupp & K. E. Carpenter, 1996

= Slender weasel shark =

Species of shark

The slender weasel shark, (Paragaleus longicaudatus), is a weasel shark of the family Hemigaleidae. It is found in the western Indian Ocean, including the Persian Gulf off Bahrain. It can grow up to a length of 48 cm (19 in).

The slender weasel shark is a harmless Viviparous species, about which little is known.

== Morphology ==
The slender weasel shark is often mistaken for smaller sharks in the family Carcharhinidae and is thus neglected in studies. However it is easy to identify morphologically: The shark has distinctly narrow, strongly falcated pectoral fins, short gill slits, a wedge like snout, and small spiracles. A notable feature is on the underside of the shark's head where two dusky stripes are found parallel to each other at the tip of the snout.

== Biology ==
Little is known about P. longicaudatus' behaviour and its distribution. However, dissections of specimens suggests that its diet mainly comprises cephalopods.
