= Acteon idoneus =

Scientific classification
- Kingdom: Animalia
- Phylum: Mollusca
- Class: Gastropoda
- Superfamily: Acteonoidea
- Family: Acteonidae
- Genus: Acteon
- Species: †A. idoneus

Binomial name
- †Acteon idoneus Conrad, 1833

Synonyms
- † Acteon lineatus I. Lea, 1833

Extinct species of gastropods

Acteon idoneus is an extinct species of sea snail, a marine gastropod mollusc in the family Acteonidae.

== Distribution ==
Fossils of this marine species have been found in Eocene strata in Alabama, USA.
