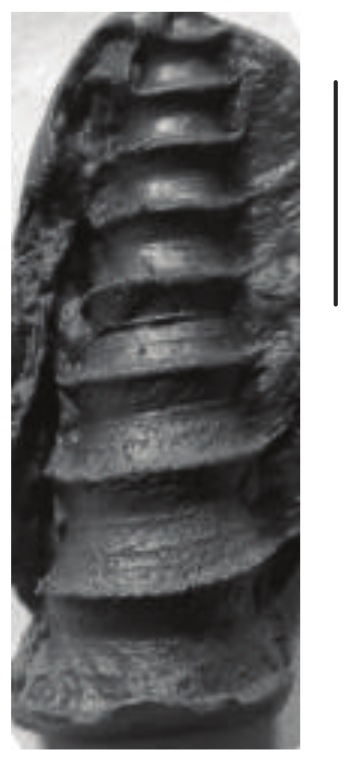
- Kapalmerella ranikoti. Scale bar is 10 mm.

Scientific classification
- Kingdom: Animalia
- Phylum: Mollusca
- Class: Gastropoda
- Subclass: Caenogastropoda
- Order: incertae sedis
- Family: Turritellidae
- Subfamily: Turritellinae
- Genus: †Kapalmerella; Allmon, 2005

Synonyms
- †Palmerella Allmon, 1996

= Kapalmerella =

Kapalmerella Temporal range: Eocene

Extinct genus of gastropods

Kapalmerella is an extinct genus of prehistoric sea snails, marine gastropod mollusks in the family Turritellidae.
