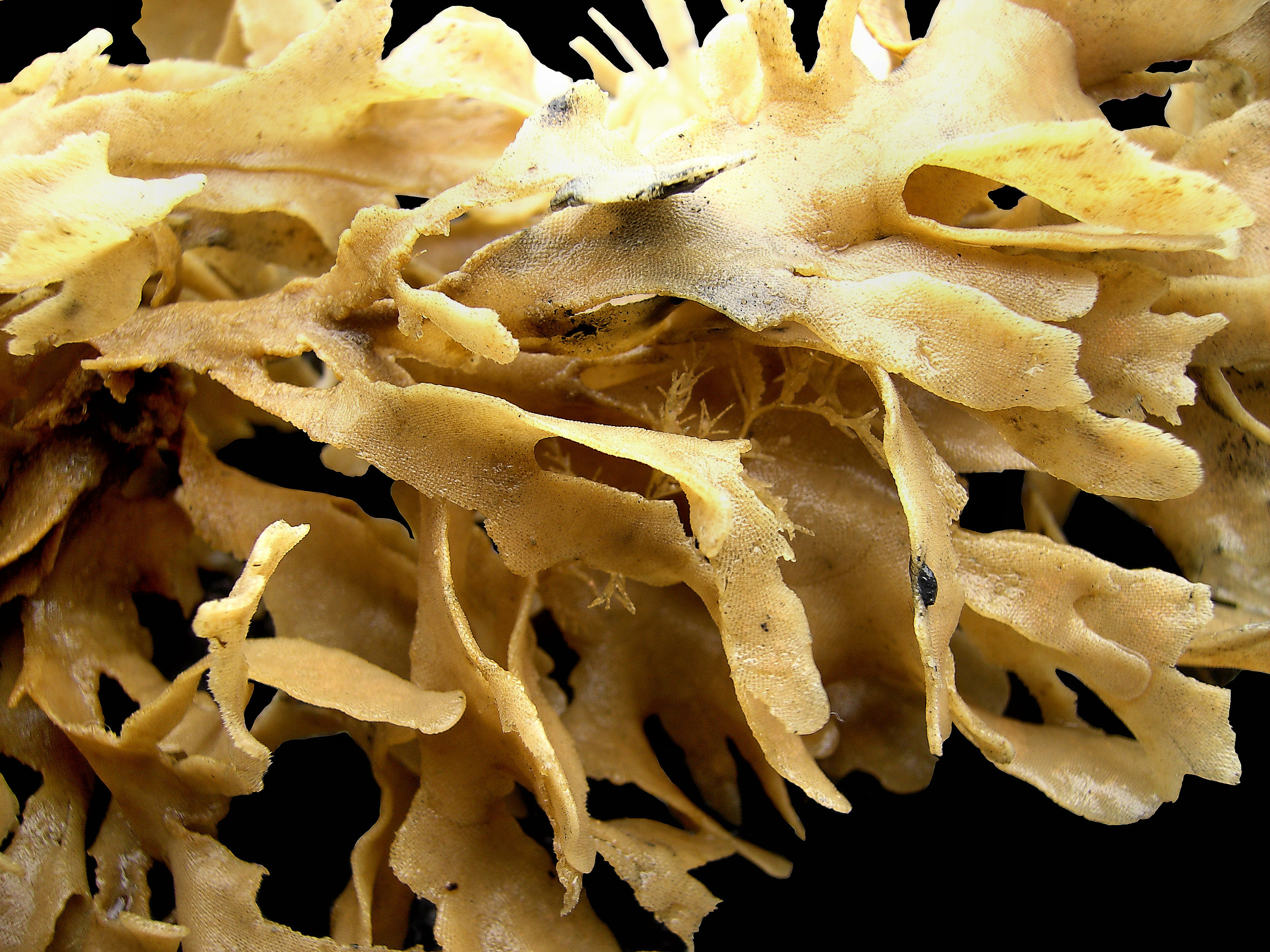
- Colony of Flustra foliacea (Flustridae)

Scientific classification
- Kingdom: Animalia
- Phylum: Bryozoa
- Class: Gymnolaemata
- Order: Cheilostomatida
- Suborder: Flustrina; Smitt, 1868

Synonyms
- Anasca; Ascophora; Ascophorina; Neocheilostomatina

= Flustrina =

Flustrina Temporal range: Early Cretaceous–Recent

Suborder of moss animals

Flustrina is a suborder under the order Cheilostomatida of gymnolaematan Bryozoa (sea mats).

== Description ==
The structure of the individual zooids is generally simple, a box-like chamber of calcium carbonate, the polypides reaching out through an uncalcified flexible frontal wall, often surrounded by numerous spines. Like in other gymnolaematans, their lophophore is protruded by muscles that pull on the frontal wall of the zooid.

== Taxonomy and systematics ==
In some treatments, the Flustrina are restricted to the superfamilies Calloporoidea and Flustroidea and ranked as infraorder alongside the Cellulariomorpha which contain three other superfamilies.

The obsolete suborder Anasca previously included the members of this suborder before being deprecated.

The following superfamilies, and families are recognised in the suborder Flustrina:

- Superfamily Adeonoidea Busk, 1884
  - Adeonidae Busk, 1884
  - †Diedroporidae Gordon & Taylor, 2015
  - Inversiulidae Vigneaux, 1949
- Superfamily Arachnopusioidea Jullien, 1888
  - Arachnopusiidae Jullien, 1888
  - Exechonellidae Harmer, 1957
- Superfamily Bifaxarioidea Busk, 1884
  - Bifaxariidae Busk, 1884
  - Mixtopeltidae Gordon, 1994
  - †Inversiulidae Marsson, 1887
- Superfamily Buguloidea Gray, 1848
  - Beaniidae Canu & Bassler, 1927
  - Bugulidae Gray, 1848
  - Candidae d'Orbigny, 1851
  - Epistomiidae Gregory, 1893
  - Euoplozoidae Harmer, 1926
  - Jubellidae Reverter-Gil & Fernández-Pulpeiro, 2001
  - Rhabdozoidae MacGillivray, 1887
- Superfamily Calloporoidea Norman, 1903
  - Antroporidae Vigneaux, 1949
  - Bryopastoridae d'Hondt & Gordon, 1999
  - Calloporidae Norman, 1903
  - Chaperiidae Jullien, 1888
  - Cupuladriidae Lagaaij, 1952
  - Cymuloporidae Winston & Vieira, 2013
  - Doryporellidae Grischenko, Taylor & Mawatari, 2004
  - Ellisinidae Vigneaux, 1949
  - Farciminariidae Busk, 1852
  - Foveolariidae Gordon & Winston, 2005
  - Heliodomidae Vigneaux, 1949
  - Hiantoporidae Gregory, 1893
  - Mourellinidae Reverter-Gil, Souto & Fernández-Pulpeiro, 2011
  - Pyrisinellidae di Martino & Taylor, 2012
  - Quadricellariidae Gordon, 1984
  - Vinculariidae Busk, 1852
- Superfamily Catenicelloidea Busk, 1852
  - Catenicellidae Busk, 1852
  - †Concatenellidae Bock & Cook, 1996
  - Eurystomellidae Levinsen, 1909
  - Petalostegidae Gordon, 1984
  - Savignyellidae Levinsen, 1909
- Superfamily Cellarioidea Fleming, 1828
  - Cellariidae Fleming, 1828
  - Membranicellariidae Levinsen, 1909
- Superfamily Celleporoidea Johnston, 1838
  - Celleporidae Johnston, 1838
  - Colatooeciidae Winston, 2005
  - Hippoporidridae Vigneaux, 1949
  - Phidoloporidae Gabb & Horn, 1862
- Superfamily Chlidoniopsoidea Harmer, 1957
  - Chlidoniopsidae Harmer, 1957
- Superfamily Conescharellinoidea Levinsen, 1909
  - Batoporidae Neviani, 1901
  - Conescharellinidae Levinsen, 1909
  - †Cuvillieridae Annoscia, 1965
  - Lekythoporidae Levinsen, 1909
  - Orbituliporidae Canu & Bassler, 1923
- Superfamily Cribrilinoidea Hincks, 1879
  - Cribrilinidae Hincks, 1879
  - Euthyroididae Levinsen, 1909
  - Inversiscaphidae Winston & Jackson, 2021
  - †Lekythoglenidae Marsson, 1887
  - Polliciporidae Moyano, 2000
  - Vitrimurellidae Winston, Vieira & Woollacott, 2014
- Superfamily Didymoselloidea Brown, 1952
  - Didymosellidae Brown, 1952
- Superfamily Euthyriselloidea Bassler, 1953
  - Clathrolunulidae Gordon & Sanner, 2020
  - Euthyrisellidae Bassler, 1953
  - Neoeuthyroididae Gordon & Sanner, 2020
- Superfamily Flustroidea Fleming, 1828
  - Flustridae Fleming, 1828
- Superfamily Hippothooidea Busk, 1859
  - Chorizoporidae Vigneaux, 1949
  - †Dysnoetoporidae Voigt, 1971
  - Haplopomidae Gordon in De Blauwe, 2009
  - Hippothoidae Busk, 1859
  - Pasytheidae Davis, 1934
  - Trypostegidae Gordon, Tilbrook & Winston, 2005
- Superfamily Lepralielloidea Vigneaux, 1949
  - Atlantisinidae Berning, Harmelin & Bader, 2017
  - Bryocryptellidae Vigneaux, 1949
  - †Cheilhorneropsidae Annoscia, Braga & Finotti, 1984
  - Dhondtiscidae Gordon, 1989
  - Escharellidae Levinsen, 1909
  - Exochellidae Bassler, 1935
  - Gemelliporellidae Vigneaux, 1949
  - Hincksiporidae Powell, 1968
  - Jaculinidae Zabala, 1986
  - Metrarabdotosidae Vigneaux, 1949
  - Romancheinidae Jullien, 1888
  - Sclerodomidae Levinsen, 1909
  - †Sfeniellidae Gordon, 2006
  - Tessaradomidae Jullien, 1903
- Superfamily Lunulitoidea Lagaaij, 1952
  - Lunulariidae Levinsen, 1909
  - †Lunulitidae Lagaaij, 1952
  - Otionellidae Bock & Cook, 1998
  - Selenariidae Busk, 1854
- Superfamily Mamilloporoidea Canu & Bassler, 1927
  - Ascosiidae Jullien, 1882
  - Cleidochasmatidae Cheetham & Sandberg, 1964
  - Crepidacanthidae Levinsen, 1909
  - †Schizorthosecidae Gordon & Sanner, 2020
- Superfamily Microporoidea Gray, 1848
  - Alysidiidae Levinsen, 1909
  - Aspidostomatidae Jullien, 1888
  - Calescharidae Cook & Bock, 2001
  - †Cardabiellidae Håkansson, Gordon & Taylor, 2024
  - Chlidoniidae Busk, 1884
  - Granomuridae Gordon, 2021
  - Microporidae Gray, 1848
  - Onychocellidae Jullien, 1882
  - Poricellariidae Harmer, 1926
  - Setosellidae Levinsen, 1909
- Superfamily Monoporelloidea Hincks, 1882
  - Macroporidae Uttley, 1949
  - Monoporellidae Hincks, 1882
- Superfamily Pseudolepralioidea Silén, 1942
  - †Brydonellidae Taylor, Casadío & Gordon, 2008
  - Pseudolepraliidae Silén, 1942
- Superfamily Schizoporelloidea Jullien, 1883
  - Acoraniidae López-Fé, 2006
  - Actisecidae Harmer, 1957
  - †Bryobaculidae Rosso, 2002
  - Buffonellidae Jullien, 1888
  - Calwelliidae MacGillivray, 1887
  - Cheiloporinidae Bassler, 1936
  - Cryptosulidae Vigneaux, 1949
  - Cyclicoporidae Hincks, 1884
  - †Duvergieriidae Vigneaux, 1949
  - Echinovadomidae Tilbrook, 2001
  - Eminooeciidae Hayward & Thorpe, 1988
  - Escharinidae Tilbrook, 2006
  - Fatkullinidae Grischenko, Gordon & Morozov, 2018
  - Fenestrulinidae Jullien, 1888
  - Gigantoporidae Bassler, 1935
  - Hippaliosinidae Winston, 2005
  - Hippopodinidae Levinsen, 1909
  - Lacernidae Jullien, 1888
  - Marcusadoreidae Winston, Vieira & Woollacott, 2014
  - Margarettidae Harmer, 1957
  - Mawatariidae Gordon, 1990
  - Microporellidae Hincks, 1879
  - Myriaporidae Gray, 1841
  - Pacificincolidae Liu & Liu, 1999
  - Petraliidae Levinsen, 1909
  - Phoceanidae Vigneaux, 1949
  - Phorioppniidae Gordon & d'Hondt, 1997
  - Porinidae d'Orbigny, 1852
  - Robertsonidridae Rosso, 2010
  - Schizoporellidae Jullien, 1882
  - Stomachetosellidae Canu & Bassler, 1917
  - Tetraplariidae Harmer, 1957
  - Teuchoporidae Neviani, 1895
  - Vicidae Gordon, 1988
- Superfamily †Scorioporoidea Gordon, 2002
  - †Nephroporidae Marsson, 1887
  - †Scorioporidae Gordon, 2002
- Superfamily Siphonicytaroidea Harmer, 1957
  - Siphonicytaridae Harmer, 1957
- Superfamily Smittinoidea Levinsen, 1909
  - Bitectiporidae MacGillivray, 1895
  - Lanceoporidae Harmer, 1957
  - Powellithecidae Di Martino, Taylor, Gordon & Liow, 2016
  - Smittinidae Levinsen, 1909
  - Watersiporidae Vigneaux, 1949
  - Smittinoidea incertae sedis
- Superfamily Umbonuloidea Canu, 1904
  - Fulgurellidae Grischenko, Gordon & Melnik, 2024
  - Umbonulidae Canu, 1904
- Superfamily Urceoliporoidea Bassler, 1936
  - Prostomariidae MacGillivray, 1895
  - Urceoliporidae Bassler, 1936
- Flustrina incertae sedis
  - Bicorniferidae Keij, 1977
  - Borioplebidae Gordon, 2021
  - †Coscinopleuridae Canu, 1913
  - †Fusicellariidae Canu, 1900
  - †Skyloniidae Sandberg, 1963
