= Escharella =

Scientific classification
- Kingdom: Animalia
- Phylum: Bryozoa
- Class: Gymnolaemata
- Order: Cheilostomatida
- Family: Escharellidae
- Genus: Escharella; Gray, 1848

Genus of bryozoans

Escharella is a genus of bryozoans belonging to the family Escharellidae.

The genus has almost cosmopolitan distribution.

Species:

- Escharella abyssicola (Norman, 1869)
- Escharella acuta Zabala, Maluquer & Harmelin, 1993
- Escharella anatirostris (O'Donoghue, 1924)
- Escharella ansata (Canu & Bassler, 1920)
- Escharella areolata
- Escharella ashapurae Guha & Gopikrishna, 2007
- Escharella bensoni (Brown, 1954)
- Escharella capitata (Canu & Lecointre, 1930)
- Escharella connectens (Ridley, 1881)
- Escharella crozetensis (Waters, 1904)
- Escharella cryptooecium Souto, Fernández-Pulpeiro & Reverter-Gil, 2007
- Escharella cycloris (Gabb & Horn, 1862)
- Escharella diaphana (MacGillivray, 1879)
- Escharella dijmphnae (Kluge, 1929)
- Escharella discors Hayward & Cook, 1983
- Escharella elongata (Canu & Bassler, 1935)
- Escharella fistula Brown, 1952
- Escharella fusca (O'Donoghue & O'Donoghue, 1926)
- Escharella gilsoni De Blauwe, 2006
- Escharella granulosa (Canu & Bassler, 1920)
- Escharella grossa Moissette, 1988
- Escharella grotriani (Stoliczka, 1862)
- Escharella guernei (Jullien & Calvet, 1903)
- Escharella hexagonalis (Canu & Bassler, 1920)
- Escharella hoernesi (Reuss, 1864)
- Escharella hozawai (Okada, 1929)
- Escharella immersa (Fleming, 1828)
- Escharella incudifera Gordon, 1984
- Escharella indivisa Levinsen, 1916
- Escharella klugei Hayward, 1979
- Escharella labiata (Boeck, 1868)
- Escharella labiosa (Busk, 1856)
- Escharella lagaaiji Buge, 1957
- Escharella laqueata (Norman, 1864)
- Escharella latodonta Kluge, 1962
- Escharella levinseni Hayward, 1994
- Escharella longicella (Canu, 1914)
- Escharella longicollis (Jullien, 1882)
- Escharella lopezfei Souto, Berning & Ostrovsky, 2016
- Escharella macrodonta Levinsen, 1917
- Escharella mamillata Hayward & Thorpe, 1989
- Escharella modica (Canu, 1926)
- Escharella nilotica (Ziko, 1985)
- Escharella obscura Norman, 1909
- Escharella octodentata (Hincks, 1880)
- Escharella ovalis (Canu & Bassler, 1929)
- Escharella ovoidea (Reuss, 1848)
- Escharella patens (Canu & Bassler, 1920)
- Escharella praealta (Calvet, 1907)
- Escharella quadrata López de la Cuadra & García-Gómez, 2001
- Escharella reussiana (Busk, 1859)
- Escharella rogeri David, Mongereau & Pouyet, 1972
- Escharella rugosa (Soule, Soule & Chaney, 1995)
- Escharella rylandi Geraci, 1974
- Escharella selseyensis Cheetham, 1966
- Escharella serratilabris (O'Donoghue, 1924)
- Escharella spinosissima (Hincks, 1881)
- Escharella takatukii (Okada, 1929)
- Escharella tenera (Reuss, 1874)
- Escharella teres (Hincks, 1881)
- Escharella thompsoni Kluge, 1914
- Escharella trispinosa Li, 1990
- Escharella uncifera (Canu & Bassler, 1929)
- Escharella variolosa (Johnston, 1838)
- Escharella ventricosa (Hassall, 1842)
- Escharella vigneauxi David, 1965
- Escharella watersi Hayward & Thorpe, 1989
