= Aeteidae =

Scientific classification
- Kingdom: Animalia
- Phylum: Bryozoa
- Class: Gymnolaemata
- Order: Cheilostomatida
- Suborder: Inovicellina
- Family: Aeteidae

Family of bryozoans

Aeteidae is a family of bryozoans belonging to the order Cheilostomatida.

Genera:

- Aetea Lamouroux, 1812
- Callaetea Winston, 2008
