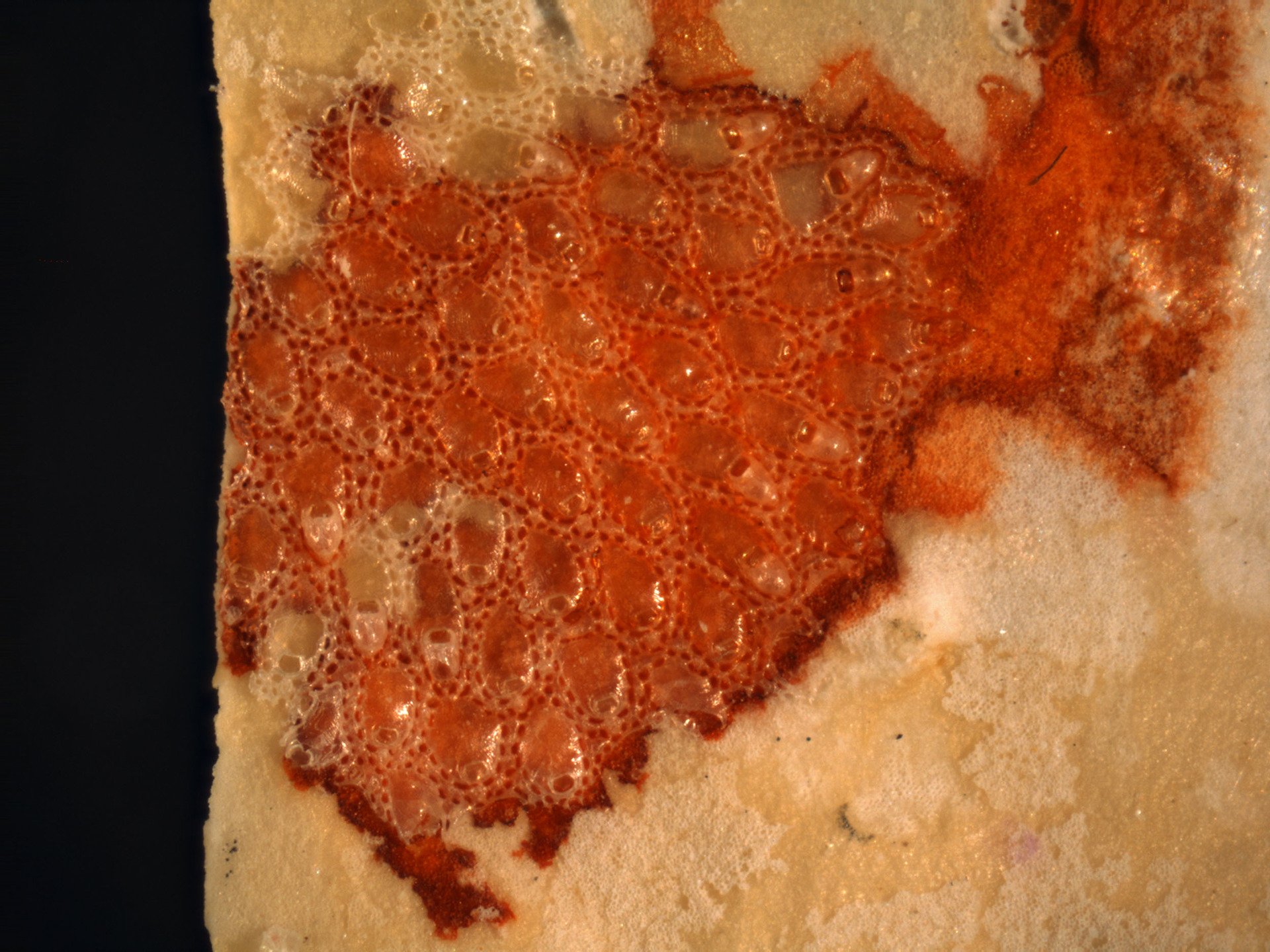
- C. brongniartii preserved specimen

Scientific classification
- Kingdom: Animalia
- Phylum: Bryozoa
- Class: Gymnolaemata
- Order: Cheilostomatida
- Family: Chorizoporidae
- Genus: Chorizopora
- Species: C. brongniartii

Binomial name
- Chorizopora brongniartii (Audouin, 1826)

Synonyms
- Cellepora brongniartii Audouin, 1826; Flustra brongniartii Audouin, 1826

= Chorizopora brongniartii =

Species of bryozoan

Chorizopora brongniartii is a species of bryozoan in the family Chorizoporidae. It is an encrusting bryozoan, the colonies forming spreading patches. It has a widespread distribution in tropical and temperate seas.

== Description ==
Chorizopora brongniartii is a colonial bryozoan forming thin encrusting patches that are shiny and translucent, whitish or pale brown. The surface is sometimes flecked with pink, indicating the presence of zooids containing developing embryos. The colonies are rounded or lobed and usually less than 1 cm (0.4 in) in diameter, but may be considerably larger. This bryozoan is difficult to observe when underwater, but easier to see when exposed. The individual zooids have transverse ridges and are smooth and convex; the zooids are separated by mosaic-like perforated troughs.

== Distribution and habitat ==
Chorizopora brongniartii has a wide distribution in tropical and temperate seas. It is known from the Indian Ocean, the West and East Pacific, the Caribbean Sea, the Western and Eastern Atlantic, the North Sea and the Mediterranean Sea. Found at depths to about 150 m (500 ft), it grows on a variety of surfaces; these include seaweed, seagrass, coral, shells, pebbles, various types of seabed, and man-made objects. It is especially common in the Mediterranean Sea growing on Posidonia.

== Ecology ==
Like other bryozoans, Chorizopora brongniartii is a filter feeder and captures small particles, mainly phytoplankton, from the water with the crown of tentacles that form the lophophore. Colonies grow by budding new zooids. The colony is hermaphrodite, with separate male and female zooids. The fertilized eggs are brooded by the female zooids for a period before being liberated into the water column as ciliated larvae. After a short planktonic phase, these settle on a suitable surface and undergo metamorphosis into primary zooids which will found new colonies.

Bryozoans and other animals that settle on hard surfaces compete for space. In an experiment near Plymouth, England, plexiglass panels were submerged at a depth of around 8 m (26 ft). These were soon covered in organisms; early settlers were various bryozoans including Chorizopora brongniartii, and the tube-building worm Pomatoceros triqueter. The worms grew so vigorously that they soon overgrew and excluded the bryozoans; however, some bryozoans colonies avoided being killed by growing onto and over the tubes of the worms, and their larvae settled preferentially on the worm-tubes. The bryozoan colonies had longer lifespans than the worms, and in the long term, the bryozoans may survive on the panels despite being weak short-term competitors. Communities on the underside of nearby boulders were mostly dominated by bryozoans and are likely to be a later successional stage; nevertheless, the undersides of a few boulders were almost entirely covered with tube-worms.
