= Leiosalpingidae =

Scientific classification
- Kingdom: Animalia
- Phylum: Bryozoa
- Class: Gymnolaemata
- Order: Cheilostomatida
- Suborder: Scrupariina
- Family: Leiosalpingidae

Family of bryozoans

Leiosalpingidae is a family of bryozoans belonging to the order Cheilostomatida.

Genera:

- Astoleiosalpinx d'Hondt & Gordon, 1996
- Leiosalpinx Hayward & Cook, 1979
