= Farciminariidae =

Scientific classification
- Kingdom: Animalia
- Phylum: Bryozoa
- Class: Gymnolaemata
- Order: Cheilostomatida
- Suborder: Flustrina
- Superfamily: Calloporoidea
- Family: Farciminariidae; Busk, 1852

Family of bryozoans

Farciminariidae is a family of bryozoans belonging to the order Cheilostomatida.

== Genera ==
The following genera are recognised in the family Farciminariidae:

- Columnella Levinsen, 1914
- Didymozoum Harmer, 1923
- Farciminaria Busk, 1852
- Farciminellum Harmer, 1926
