= Eurystomella =

Scientific classification
- Kingdom: Animalia
- Phylum: Bryozoa
- Class: Gymnolaemata
- Order: Cheilostomatida
- Family: Eurystomellidae
- Genus: Eurystomella; Levinsen, 1909

Genus of bryozoans

Eurystomella is a genus of bryozoans belonging to the family Eurystomellidae.

The species of this genus are found in New Zealand and Western North America.

Species:

- Eurystomella aupouria Gordon, Mawatari & Kajihara, 2002
- Eurystomella biperforata Gordon, Mawatari & Kajihara, 2002
- Eurystomella foraminigera (Hincks, 1883)
