= Heliodomidae =

Scientific classification
- Kingdom: Animalia
- Phylum: Bryozoa
- Class: Gymnolaemata
- Order: Cheilostomatida
- Suborder: Flustrina
- Superfamily: Calloporoidea
- Family: Heliodomidae; Vigneaux, 1949

Family of bryozoans

Heliodomidae is a family of bryozoans belonging to the order Cheilostomatida.

== Genera ==
There are two genera recognised in the family Heliodomidae:

- Heliodoma Calvet, 1907
- Setosellina Calvet, 1906
