= Otionellidae =

Scientific classification
- Kingdom: Animalia
- Phylum: Bryozoa
- Class: Gymnolaemata
- Order: Cheilostomatida
- Suborder: Flustrina
- Superfamily: Lunulitoidea
- Family: Otionellidae; Bock & Cook, 1998

Family of bryozoans

Otionellidae is a family of bryozoans belonging to the order Cheilostomatida.

Genera:

- Helixotionella Cook & Chimonides, 1984
- Kausiaria Bock & Cook, 1998
- Otiochmella Zágoršek, 2003
- Otionella Canu & Bassler, 1917
- Otionellina Bock & Cook, 1998
- Petasosella Bock & Cook, 1998
