= Monoporella =

Scientific classification
- Kingdom: Animalia
- Phylum: Bryozoa
- Class: Gymnolaemata
- Order: Cheilostomatida
- Family: Monoporellidae
- Genus: Monoporella; Hincks, 1881

Synonyms
- Haploporella Hincks, 1881

Genus of bryozoans

Monoporella is a genus of bryozoans in the family Monoporellidae. The genus has a cosmopolitan distribution.

== Species ==
The following species are recognised in the genus Monoporella:

- Monoporella aleutica Dick, 2008
- †Monoporella ashtanensis Abbas & El-Senoussi, 1979
- †Monoporella bosqueti (Beissel, 1865)
- Monoporella bouchardii (Audouin, 1826)
- †Monoporella carinata (Maplestone, 1900)
- Monoporella carinifera Canu & Bassler, 1929
- †Monoporella convexa (Canu, 1911)
- Monoporella crassa Canu & Bassler, 1929
- Monoporella divae Marcus, 1955
- Monoporella ellefsoni Dick, 2008
- Monoporella elongata Dick, 2008
- †Monoporella exsculpta (Marsson, 1887)
- Monoporella fimbriata Canu & Bassler, 1927
- Monoporella flexibila Dick, 2008
- Monoporella gigantea Dick, 2008
- †Monoporella laevis Levinsen, 1925
- †Monoporella multilamellosa (Canu & Bassler, 1920)
- Monoporella nodulifera (Hincks, 1881)
- †Monoporella planulata (Canu, 1911)
- †Monoporella prisca Favorskaya, 1980
- Monoporella projecta Arakawa, 2020
- Monoporella seastormi Dick, 2008
- †Monoporella sulcata Levinsen, 1925
- †Monoporella sulcoecia Kataoka, 1961
- Monoporella tenuimargo Canu & Bassler, 1929
- †Monoporella venusta (Eichwald, 1868)
- †Monoporella vincentownensis (Ulrich & Bassler, 1907)
