= Columnella =

Scientific classification
- Kingdom: Animalia
- Phylum: Bryozoa
- Class: Gymnolaemata
- Order: Cheilostomatida
- Family: Farciminariidae
- Genus: Columnella; Levinsen, 1914

Genus of bryozoans

Columnella is a genus of bryozoans belonging to the family Farciminariidae.

The genus has almost cosmopolitan distribution.

Species:

- Columnella accincta Hayward, 1981
- Columnella bipectinata David & Pouyet, 1986
- Columnella borealis (Levinsen, 1909)
- Columnella brasiliensis (Busk, 1884)
- Columnella carinata (Harmer, 1926)
- Columnella delicatissima (Busk, 1884)
- Columnella gracilis (Busk, 1884)
- Columnella graminea Hayward, 1981
- Columnella magna (Busk, 1884)
- Columnella pacifica (Busk, 1884)
- Columnella tecta (Hasenbank, 1932)
- Columnella vipera d'Hondt & Gordon, 1999
