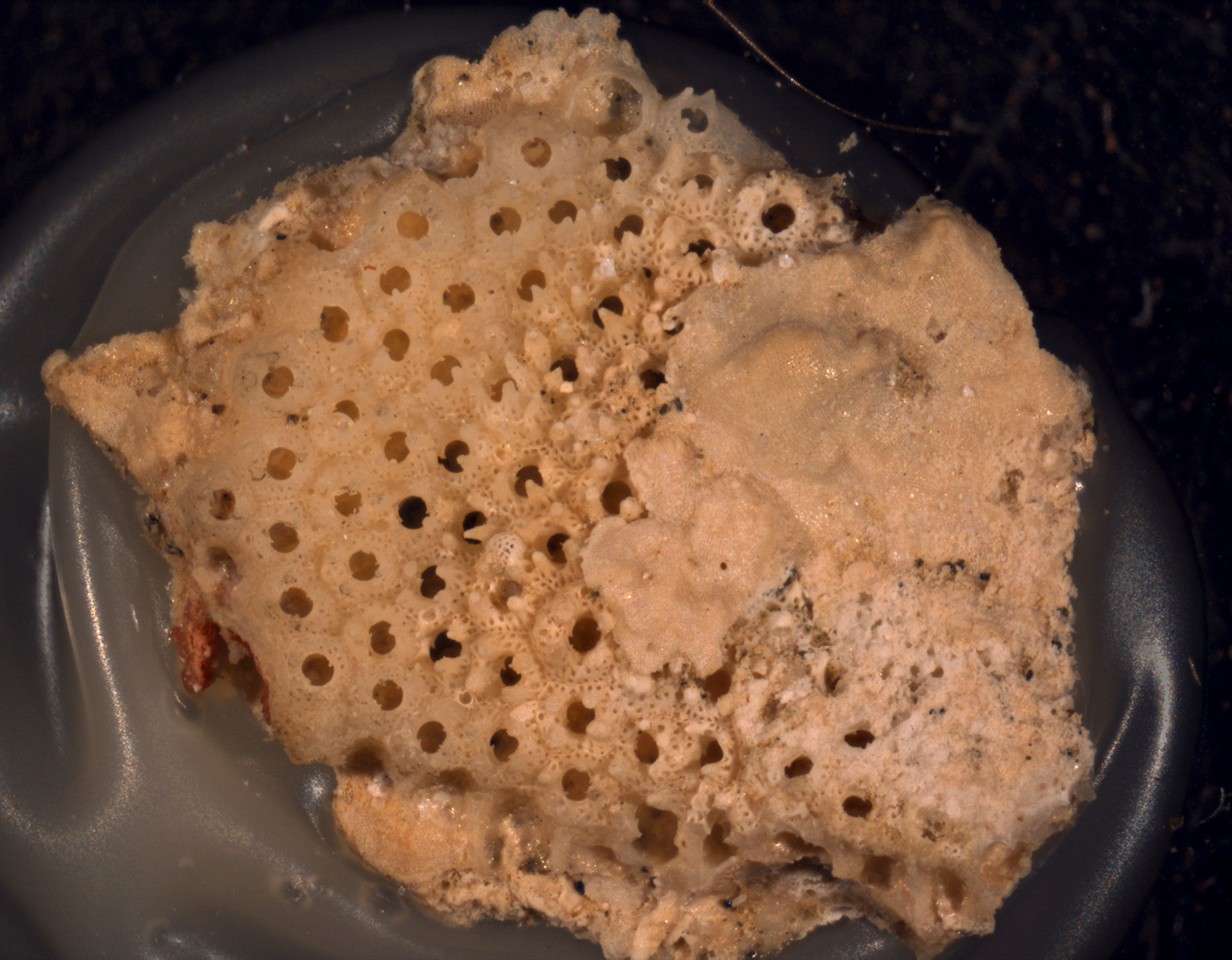

Scientific classification
- Kingdom: Animalia
- Phylum: Bryozoa
- Class: Gymnolaemata
- Order: Cheilostomatida
- Family: Colatooeciidae
- Genus: Cigclisula; Canu & Bassler, 1927

= Cigclisula =

Genus of bryozoans

Cigclisula is a genus of bryozoans belonging to the family Colatooeciidae.

The genus has almost cosmopolitan distribution.

== Species ==
Species:

- Cigclisula arborescens
- Cigclisula areolata (Kirkpatrick, 1890)
- Cigclisula australis Almeida, Souza, Menegola, Sanner & Vieira, 2014
- Cigclisula buski Almeida, Souza, Menegola, Sanner & Vieira, 2014
- Cigclisula cautium Hastings, 1932
- Cigclisula fissurata (Ortmann, 1890)
- Cigclisula fistulosa Almeida, Souza, Menegola, Sanner & Vieira, 2014
- Cigclisula fruticosa Hayward & Ryland, 1995
- Cigclisula gallensis (Thornely, 1906)
- Cigclisula occlusa (Busk, 1884)
