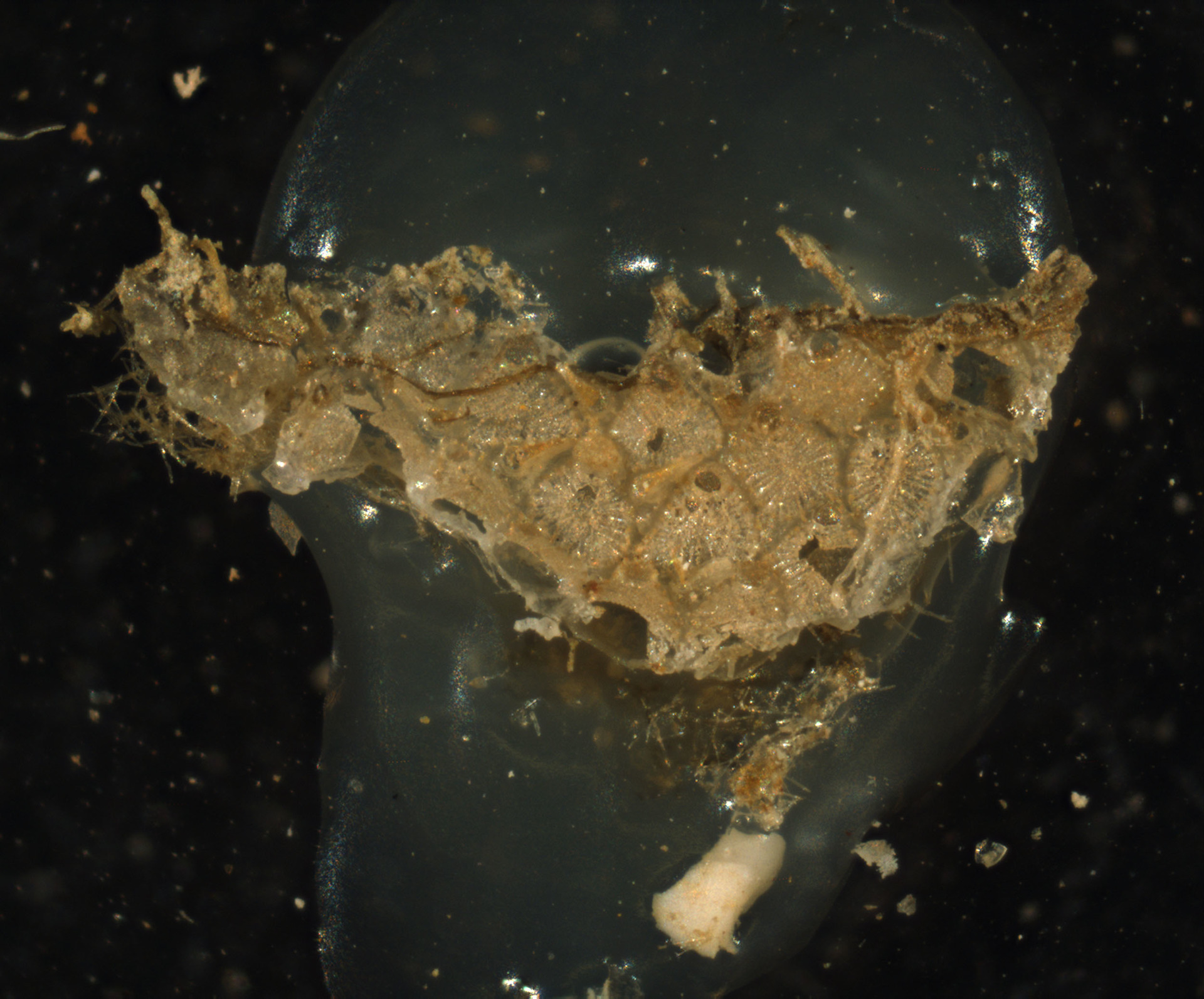
- Umbonula.jpg

Scientific classification
- Kingdom: Animalia
- Phylum: Bryozoa
- Class: Gymnolaemata
- Order: Cheilostomatida
- Family: Umbonulidae
- Genus: Umbonula; Hincks, 1880

= Umbonula =

Genus of bryozoans

Umbonula is a genus of bryozoans belonging to the family Umbonulidae.

The genus has almost cosmopolitan distribution.

Species:

- Umbonula alvareziana (d'Orbigny, 1842)
- Umbonula austriensis David & Pouyet, 1974
- Umbonula bartonensis Gregory, 1893
- Umbonula boucheti David & Pouyet, 1970
- Umbonula calcariformis Gregory, 1893
- Umbonula cyrtoporoidea Koschinsky, 1885
- Umbonula elongata Canu & Lecointre, 1930
- Umbonula endlicheri (Reuss, 1847)
- Umbonula gigantea Canu, 1912
- Umbonula granulata Zágoršek, 2010
- Umbonula leda Canu, 1908
- Umbonula macrocheila (Reuss, 1847)
- Umbonula margaritata Koschinsky, 1885
- Umbonula megastoma (Busk, 1859)
- Umbonula miser Canu & Bassler, 1920
- Umbonula multispina David & Pouyet, 1972
- Umbonula ovicellata Hastings, 1944
- Umbonula paraboucheti David & Pouyet, 1972
- Umbonula patens (Smitt, 1868)
- Umbonula pliocenica Pouyet, 1976
- Umbonula reteporacites Canu, 1908
- Umbonula spinosa (Procházka, 1893)
- Umbonula undulata Canu & Bassler, 1928
- Umbonula wemmeliensis Canu & Bassler, 1929
