= Gemelliporidra =

Scientific classification
- Kingdom: Animalia
- Phylum: Bryozoa
- Class: Gymnolaemata
- Order: Cheilostomatida
- Family: Hippaliosinidae
- Genus: Gemelliporidra; Canu & Bassler, 1927

Genus of bryozoans

Gemelliporidra is a genus of bryozoans belonging to the family Hippaliosinidae.

The species of this genus are found in Central America.

Species:

- Gemelliporidra aculeata Canu & Bassler, 1928
- Gemelliporidra belikina Winston, 1984
- Gemelliporidra circumvestiens (Wood, 1844)
- Gemelliporidra colombiensis Osburn, 1952
- Gemelliporidra lata Osburn, 1952
- Gemelliporidra magniporosa (Canu & Bassler, 1923)
- Gemelliporidra multilamellosa (Canu & Bassler, 1923)
- Gemelliporidra ornatissima Canu & Bassler, 1928
- Gemelliporidra pertusa (Smitt, 1873)
- Gemelliporidra typica Canu & Bassler, 1927
