= Lagenicella =

Scientific classification
- Kingdom: Animalia
- Phylum: Bryozoa
- Class: Gymnolaemata
- Order: Cheilostomatida
- Family: Teuchoporidae
- Genus: Lagenicella; Cheetham & Sandberg, 1964

Genus of bryozoans

Lagenicella is a genus of bryozoans belonging to the family Teuchoporidae.

The species of this genus are found in North America.

Species:

- Lagenicella admiranda (Osburn, 1952)
- Lagenicella cylindrica (Harmer, 1957)
- Lagenicella echinata Winston & Jackson, 2021
- Lagenicella helmbergensis Zágoršek, 2001
- Lagenicella hippocrepis (Busk, 1856)
- Lagenicella lacunosa (Bassler, 1934)
- Lagenicella marginata (Canu & Bassler, 1930)
- Lagenicella mexicana (Osburn, 1952)
- Lagenicella neosocialis Dick & Ross, 1988
- Lagenicella nipponica (Sakakura, 1935)
- Lagenicella punctulata (Gabb & Horn, 1862)
- Lagenicella spinulosa (Hincks, 1884)
- Lagenicella variabilis Moyano, 1991
