= Quadricellariidae =

Scientific classification
- Kingdom: Animalia
- Phylum: Bryozoa
- Class: Gymnolaemata
- Order: Cheilostomatida
- Suborder: Flustrina
- Superfamily: Calloporoidea
- Family: Quadricellariidae; Gordon, 1984

Family of bryozoans

Quadricellariidae is a family of bryozoans belonging to the order Cheilostomatida.

== Genera ==
The following genera are recognised in the family Quadricellariidae:

- †Cellarinidra Canu & Bassler, 1927
- †Curvacella Labracherie, 1970
- †Hemistylus Voigt, 1928
- †Mediosola Labracherie, 1970
- Nellia Busk, 1852
- Nelliella Mawatari, 1974
- Quadricellaria d'Orbigny, 1851
- †Quadrilateralia Martha, Sanner, Cheetham & Scholz, 2025
- †Vincularina d'Orbigny, 1851
