= Escharopsis =

Scientific classification
- Kingdom: Animalia
- Phylum: Bryozoa
- Class: Gymnolaemata
- Order: Cheilostomatida
- Family: Umbonulidae
- Genus: Escharopsis; Verrill, 1879

Genus of bryozoans

Escharopsis is a genus of bryozoans belonging to the family Umbonulidae.

The species of this genus are found in northern Atlantic Ocean.

Species:

- Escharopsis kurilensis Gontar, 2019
- Escharopsis lobata (Lamouroux, 1821)
- Escharopsis tatarica Androsova, 1958
