= Doryporellidae =

Scientific classification
- Kingdom: Animalia
- Phylum: Bryozoa
- Class: Gymnolaemata
- Order: Cheilostomatida
- Suborder: Flustrina
- Superfamily: Calloporoidea
- Family: Doryporellidae; Grischenko, Taylor & Mawatari, 2004

Family of bryozoans

Doryporellidae is a family of bryozoans belonging to the order Cheilostomatida.

== Genera ==
There are two genera recognised in the family Doryporellidae:

- Doryporella Norman, 1903
- Doryporellina Grischenko, Mawatari & Taylor, 2000
