= Tendridae =

Scientific classification
- Kingdom: Animalia
- Phylum: Bryozoa
- Class: Gymnolaemata
- Order: Cheilostomatida
- Suborder: Tendrina
- Superfamily: Tendroidea
- Family: Tendridae; Vigneaux, 1949

Family of bryozoans

Tendridae is a family of bryozoans belonging to the order Cheilostomatida.

== Genera ==
There are two genera recognised in the family Tendridae:

- Heterooecium Hincks, 1892
- Tendra de Nordmann, 1839
