= Farciminaria =

Scientific classification
- Kingdom: Animalia
- Phylum: Bryozoa
- Class: Gymnolaemata
- Order: Cheilostomatida
- Family: Farciminariidae
- Genus: Farciminaria; Busk, 1852

Genus of bryozoans

Farciminaria is a genus of bryozoans belonging to the family Farciminariidae.

The species of this genus are found in Australia, Japan, Atlantic Ocean.

Species:

- Farciminaria aculeata Busk, 1852
- Farciminaria biseriata Waters, 1888
- Farciminaria cribraria Busk, 1884
- Farciminaria punctata Kirchenpauer, 1869
- Farciminaria simplex MacGillivray, 1886
- Farciminaria uncinata Hincks, 1884
