= Cheilopora =

Scientific classification
- Kingdom: Animalia
- Phylum: Bryozoa
- Class: Gymnolaemata
- Order: Cheilostomatida
- Family: Cheiloporinidae
- Genus: Cheilopora; Levinsen, 1909

Genus of bryozoans

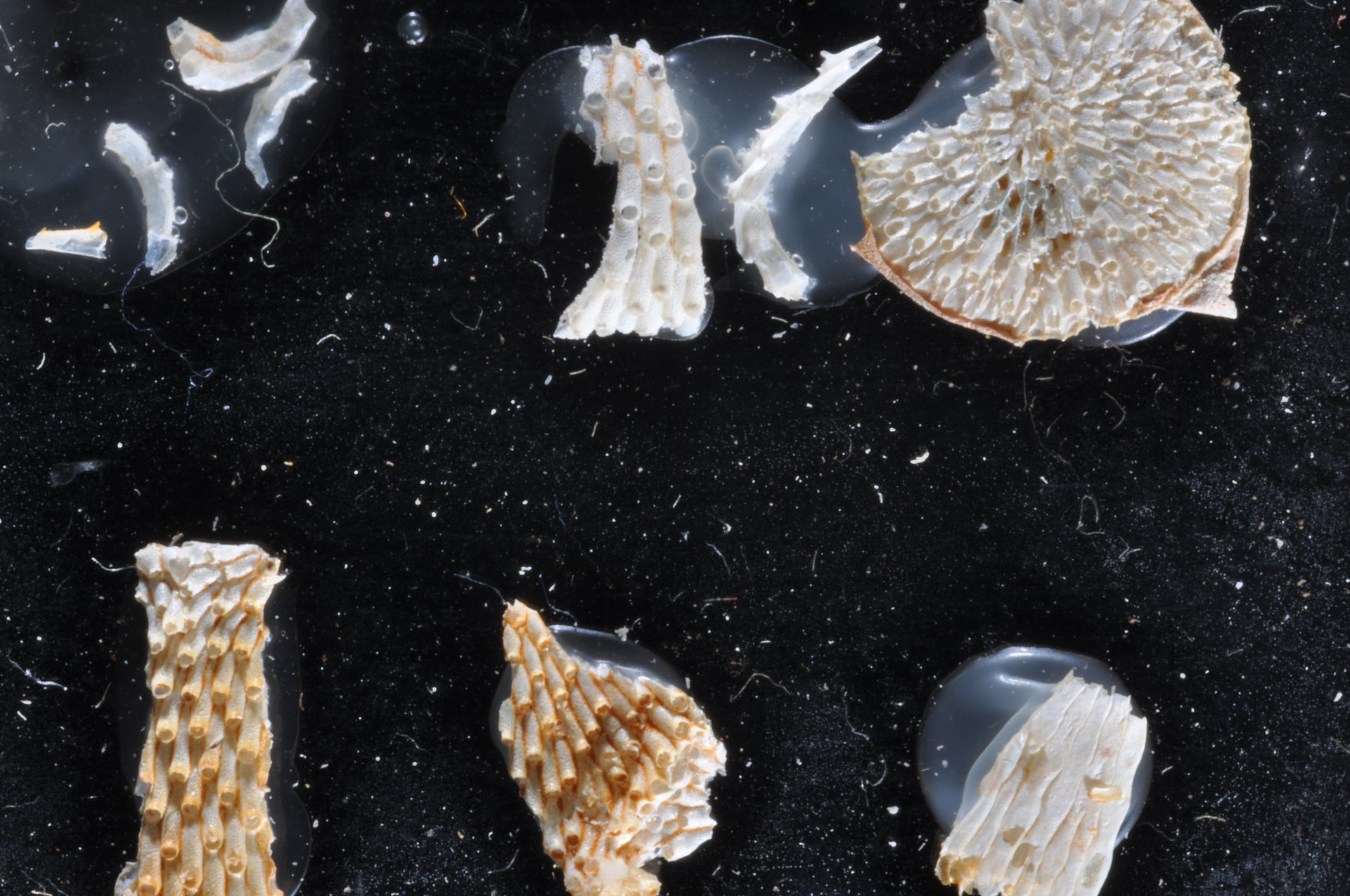
Cheilopora praelonga

Cheilopora is a genus of bryozoans belonging to the family Cheiloporinidae.

The genus has almost cosmopolitan distribution.

Species:

- Cheilopora elfa Kuklinski, Grischenko & Jewett, 2015
- Cheilopora grandis Canu & Bassler, 1929
- Cheilopora inermis (Busk, 1860)
- Cheilopora labiosa (Ulrich, 1901)
- Cheilopora peristomata Kuklinski, Grischenko & Jewett, 2015
- Cheilopora praelonga (Hincks, 1884)
- Cheilopora praelucida (Hincks, 1888)
- Cheilopora rhodanica Pouyet, 1991
- Cheilopora sincera (Smitt, 1867)
