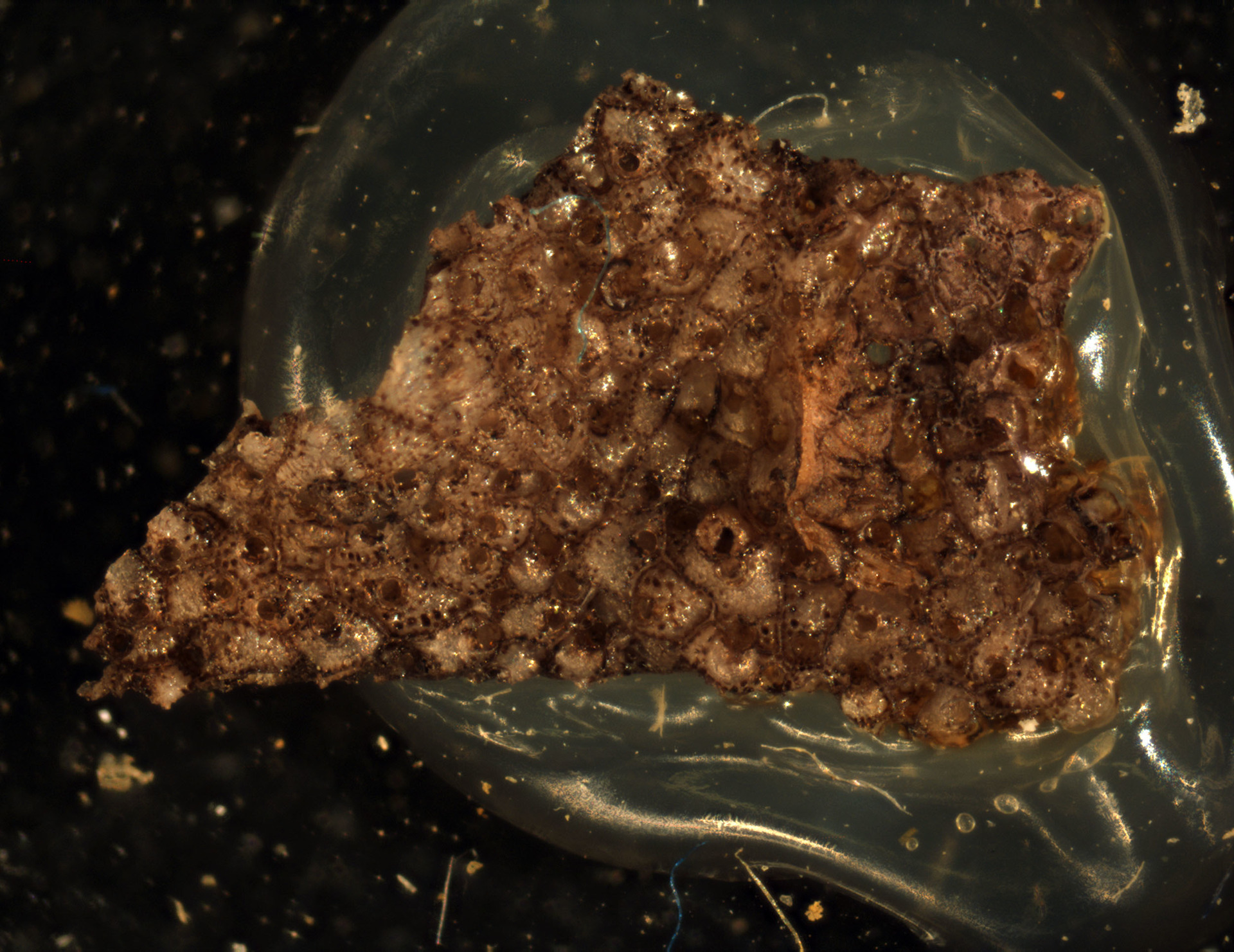

Scientific classification
- Kingdom: Animalia
- Phylum: Bryozoa
- Class: Gymnolaemata
- Order: Cheilostomatida
- Family: Stomachetosellidae
- Genus: Stomachetosella; Canu & Bassler, 1917

= Stomachetosella =

Genus of moss animals

Stomachetosella is a genus of marine, filter-feeding invertebrates, known as bryozoa, belonging to the order Cheilostomatida. The genus name derives from the Latin stoma, meaning "mouth," and ochetos, meaning "small canal."

== Species ==
- Stomachetosella abyssicola Osburn, 1952
- Stomachetosella balani (O'Donoghue & de Watteville, 1944)
- Stomachetosella collaris (Kluge, 1946)
- Stomachetosella condylata Soule, Soule & Chaney, 1995
- Stomachetosella decorata Grischenko, Dick & Mawatari, 2007
- Stomachetosella distincta Osburn, 1952
- Stomachetosella limbata (Lorenz, 1886)
- Stomachetosella magniporata (Nordgaard, 1906)
- Stomachetosella normani Hayward, 1994
- Stomachetosella perforata (Canu & Bassler, 1929)
- Stomachetosella producta (Packard, 1863)
- Stomachetosella sienna Dick & Ross, 1988
