= Selenariidae =

Scientific classification
- Kingdom: Animalia
- Phylum: Bryozoa
- Class: Gymnolaemata
- Order: Cheilostomatida
- Suborder: Flustrina
- Superfamily: Lunulitoidea
- Family: Selenariidae; Busk, 1854

Family of bryozoans

Selenariidae is a family of bryozoans belonging to the order Cheilostomatida.

Genera:

- Pseudolunularia Cadée, Chimonides & Cook, 1989
- Selenaria Busk, 1854
