= Monoporellidae =

Scientific classification
- Kingdom: Animalia
- Phylum: Bryozoa
- Class: Gymnolaemata
- Order: Cheilostomatida
- Suborder: Flustrina
- Superfamily: Monoporelloidea
- Family: Monoporellidae; Hincks, 1882

Family of bryozoans

Monoporellidae is a family of bryozoans belonging to the order Cheilostomatida.

== Genera ==
The following genera are recognised in the family Monoporellidae:

- †Catalinella Martha, Sanner, Cheetham & Scholz, 2025
- Monoporella Hincks, 1881
- †Stichomicropora Voigt, 1949
