= Buffonellodidae =

Scientific classification
- Kingdom: Animalia
- Phylum: Bryozoa
- Class: Gymnolaemata
- Order: Cheilostomatida
- Family: Buffonellodidae

Family of bryozoans

Buffonellodidae is a family of bryozoans belonging to the order Cheilostomatida.

Genera:

- Aimulosia Jullien, 1888
- Buffonellodes Strand, 1928
- Chataimulosia Gordon & Taylor, 1999
- Hippadenella Canu & Bassler, 1917
- Ipsibuffonella Gordon & d'Hondt, 1997
- Julianca Gordon, 1989
- Kymella Canu & Bassler, 1917
- Maiabuffonella Gordon & d'Hondt, 1997
- Xenogma Gordon, 2014
