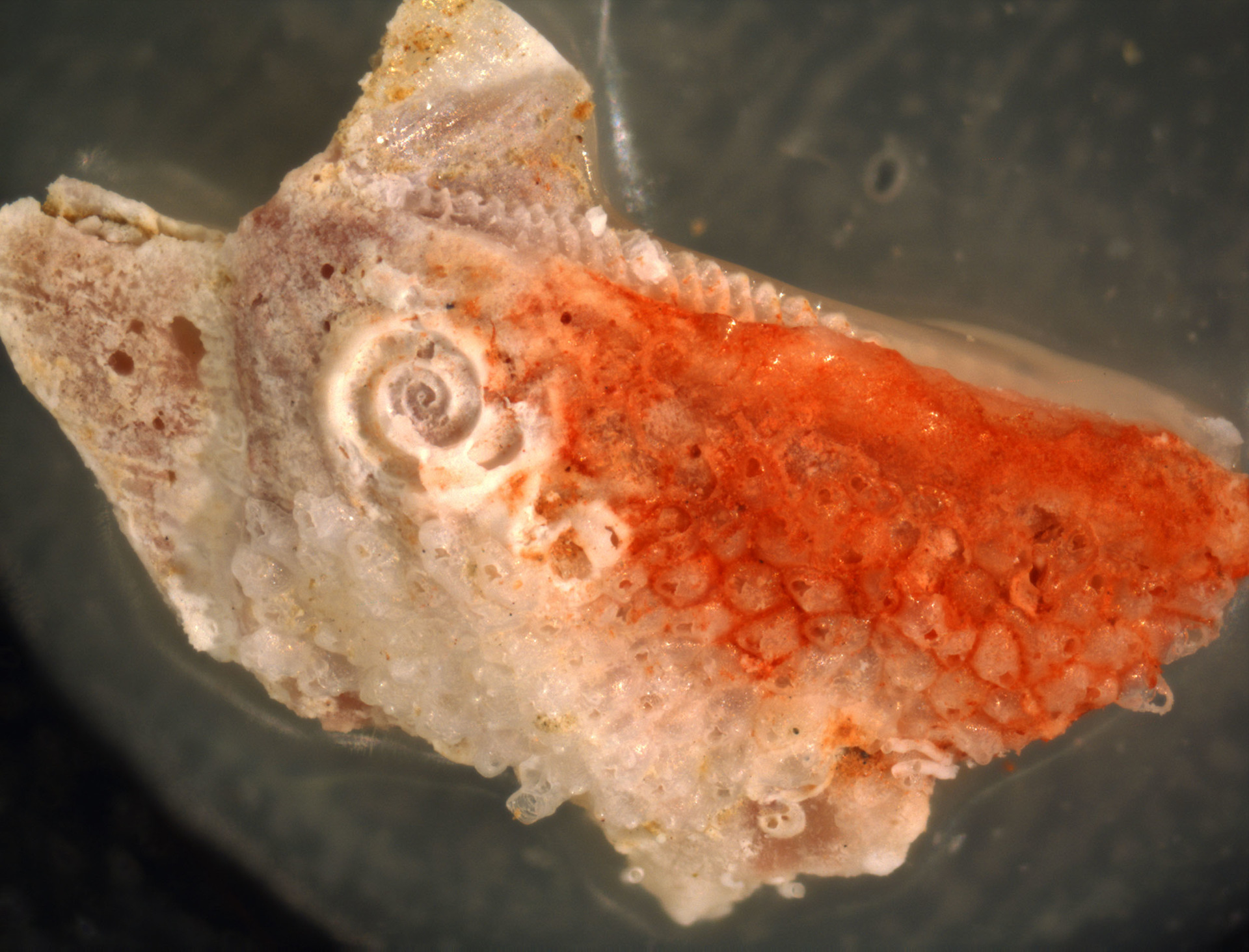
- Crepidacantha sp.

Scientific classification
- Kingdom: Animalia
- Phylum: Bryozoa
- Class: Gymnolaemata
- Order: Cheilostomatida
- Family: Crepidacanthidae
- Genus: Crepidacantha; Levinsen, 1909

= Crepidacantha =

Genus of bryozoans

Crepidacantha is a genus of bryozoans belonging to the family Crepidacanthidae.

The genus has cosmopolitan distribution.

Species:

- Crepidacantha anakenensis Moyano, 1973
- Crepidacantha bracebridgei Brown, 1954
- Crepidacantha carsioseta Winston & Heimberg, 1986
- Crepidacantha craticula Tilbrook, 2006
- Crepidacantha crinispina Levinsen, 1909
- Crepidacantha grandis Canu & Bassler, 1929
- Crepidacantha kirkpatricki Brown, 1954
- Crepidacantha longiseta Canu & Bassler, 1928
- Crepidacantha odontostoma (Reuss, 1874)
- Crepidacantha parvipora Canu & Bassler, 1930
- Crepidacantha poissonii (Audouin, 1826)
- Crepidacantha setigera (Smitt, 1873)
- Crepidacantha solea Canu & Bassler, 1929
- Crepidacantha teres (Hincks, 1880)
- Crepidacantha zelanica Canu & Bassler, 1929
