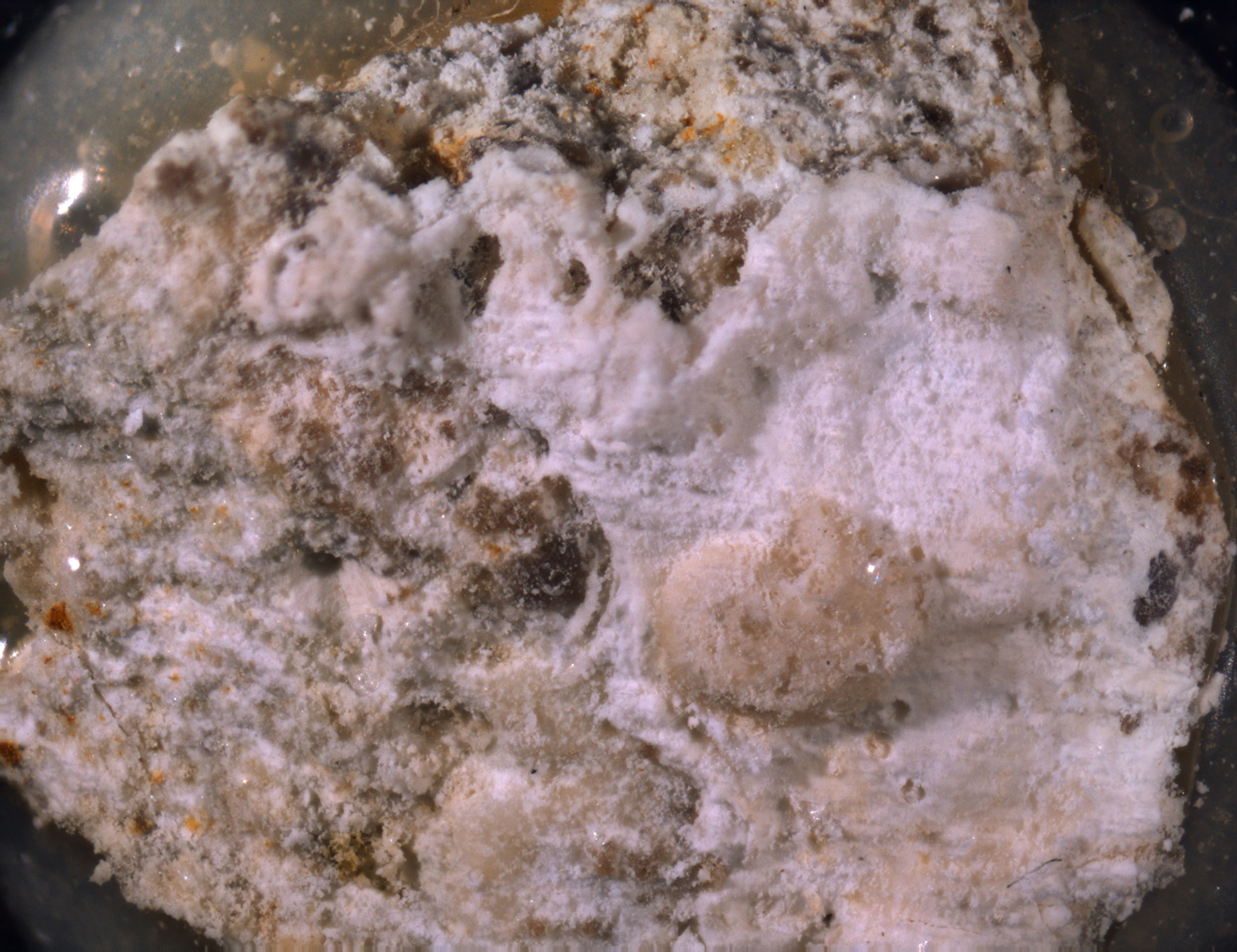

Scientific classification
- Kingdom: Animalia
- Phylum: Bryozoa
- Class: Gymnolaemata
- Order: Cheilostomatida
- Suborder: Flustrina
- Superfamily: Schizoporelloidea
- Family: Stomachetosellidae; Canu & Bassler, 1917

Genera
- See classification

= Stomachetosellidae =

Stomachetosellidae Temporal range: Eocene - Recent

Family of moss animals

The Stomachetosellidae is a family within the bryozoan order Cheilostomatida. Colonies are encrusting on shells and rocks or upright bilaminar branches or sheets. The zooids generally have at least one adventitious avicularia on their frontal wall near the orifice. The frontal wall is usually covered with small pores and numerous larger pores along the margin. The ovicell, which broods the larvae internally, is double-layered with numerous pores in the outer layer, and sits quite prominently on the frontal wall of the next zooid.

== Classification ==
- Family Stomachetosellidae
  - Genus Cycloperiella
  - Genus Junerossia
  - Genus Metradolium
  - Genus Metrocrypta
  - Genus Schizemiella
  - Genus Stephanotrema
  - Genus Stomachetosella
  - Genus Tremoschizodina
