= Rhabdozoum =

Scientific classification
- Kingdom: Animalia
- Phylum: Bryozoa
- Class: Gymnolaemata
- Order: Cheilostomatida
- Suborder: Flustrina
- Superfamily: Buguloidea
- Family: Rhabdozoidae; MacGillivray, 1887
- Genus: Rhabdozoum; Hincks, 1882

Genus of bryozoans

Rhabdozoum is a genus of bryozoans belonging to the monotypic family Rhabdozoidae.

The species of this genus are found in Australia and New Zealand.

== Species ==
There are two species recognised in the genus Rhabdozoum :

- Rhabdozoum stephensoni O'Donoghue & de Watteville, 1944
- Rhabdozoum wilsoni Hincks, 1882
