= Coleopora =

Scientific classification
- Kingdom: Animalia
- Phylum: Bryozoa
- Class: Gymnolaemata
- Order: Cheilostomatida
- Family: Teuchoporidae
- Genus: Coleopora; Canu & Bassler, 1927

Genus of bryozoans

Coleopora is a genus of bryozoans belonging to the family Teuchoporidae.

The species of this genus are found in Northern America and Australia.

Species:

- Coleopora americana Osburn, 1940
- Coleopora asanoi Kataoka, 1961
- Coleopora gigantea Osburn, 1952
- Coleopora granulosa Canu & Bassler, 1928
- Coleopora insignis (Reuss, 1874)
- Coleopora seriata (Canu & Bassler, 1929)
- Coleopora tsugaruensis Kataoka, 1957
