= Calescharidae =

Scientific classification
- Kingdom: Animalia
- Phylum: Bryozoa
- Class: Gymnolaemata
- Order: Cheilostomatida
- Suborder: Flustrina
- Superfamily: Microporoidea
- Family: Calescharidae; Cook & Bock, 2001

Family of bryozoans

Calescharidae is a family of bryozoans belonging to the order Cheilostomatida.

== Genera ==
The following genera are recognised in the family Calescharidae:

- Caleschara MacGillivray, 1880
- Hagenowinella Canu, 1900
- Tretosina Canu & Bassler, 1927
