= Chorizopora =

Scientific classification
- Kingdom: Animalia
- Phylum: Bryozoa
- Class: Gymnolaemata
- Order: Cheilostomatida
- Family: Chorizoporidae
- Genus: Chorizopora; Hincks, 1879

Genus of bryozoans

Chorizopora is a genus of bryozoans belonging to the family Chorizoporidae.

The genus has almost cosmopolitan distribution.

== Species ==
Species:

- Chorizopora annulata (Lamouroux, 1821)
- Chorizopora atrox d'Hondt, 1986
- Chorizopora brogniartii (Audouin, 1826)
- Chorizopora brongniartii (Audouin, 1826)
