= Mamilloporidae =

Scientific classification
- Domain: Eukaryota
- Kingdom: Animalia
- Phylum: Bryozoa
- Class: Gymnolaemata
- Order: Cheilostomatida
- Family: Mamilloporidae

Family of bryozoans

Mamilloporidae is a family of bryozoans belonging to the order Cheilostomatida.

Genera:

- Anoteropora Canu & Bassler, 1927
- Mamillopora Smitt, 1873
