= Malakosaria =

Scientific classification
- Kingdom: Animalia
- Phylum: Bryozoa
- Class: Gymnolaemata
- Order: Cheilostomatida
- Family: Calwelliidae
- Genus: Malakosaria; Goldstein, 1882

Genus of bryozoans

Malakosaria is a genus of bryozoans belonging to the family Calwelliidae.

The species of this genus are found in southern South Hemisphere.

Species:

- Malakosaria atlantica Vieira, Gordon, Souza & Haddad, 2010
- Malakosaria cecilioi Figuerola, Gordon & Cristobo, 2018
- Malakosaria dentata (MacGillivray, 1885)
- Malakosaria pholaramphos Goldstein, 1882
- Malakosaria sinclairii (Busk, 1857)
