= Macroporidae =

Scientific classification
- Kingdom: Animalia
- Phylum: Bryozoa
- Class: Gymnolaemata
- Order: Cheilostomatida
- Suborder: Flustrina
- Superfamily: Monoporelloidea
- Family: Macroporidae; Uttley, 1949

Family of bryozoans

Macroporidae is a family of bryozoans belonging to the order Cheilostomatida.

== Genera ==
There are two genera recognised in the family Macroporidae:

- †Eomacropora Håkansson, Gordon & Taylor, 2024
- Macropora MacGillivray, 1895
