= Fenestrulina rugula =

Scientific classification
- Kingdom: Animalia
- Phylum: Bryozoa
- Class: Gymnolaemata
- Order: Cheilostomatida
- Family: Fenestrulinidae
- Genus: Fenestrulina
- Species: F. rugula

Binomial name
- Fenestrulina rugula Hayward & Ryland, 1990

Species of moss animal

Fenestrulina rugula is a bryozoan species from the genus Fenestrulina. The scientific name of the species was first published in 1990 by Hayward & Ryland.
