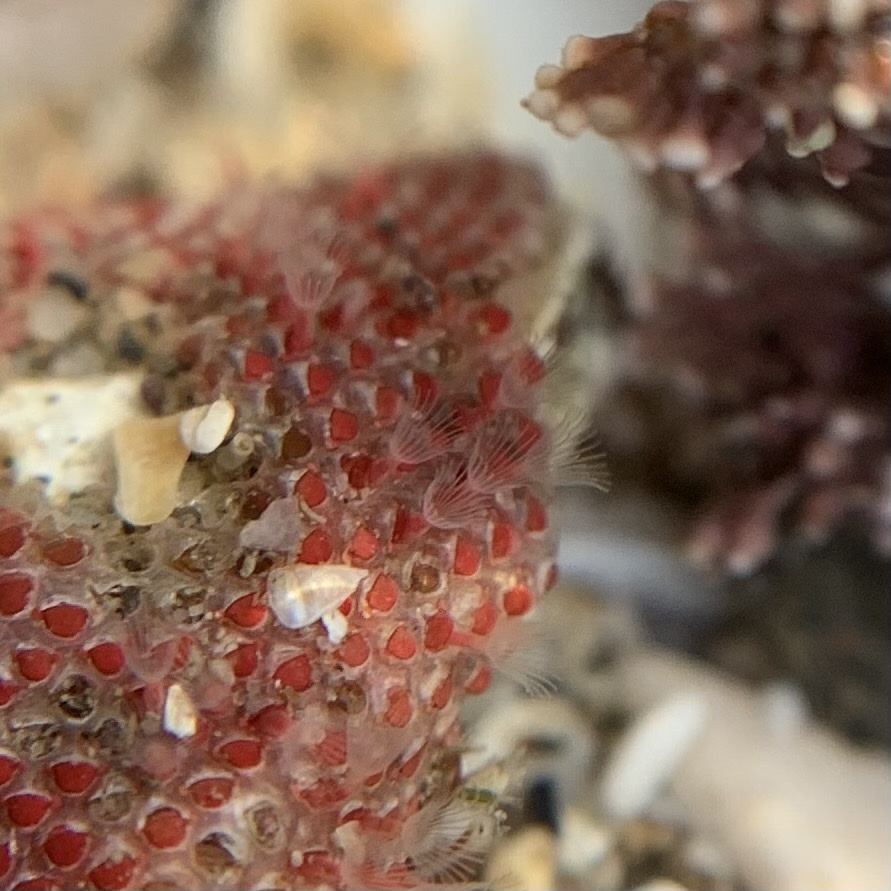
- Integripelta bilabiata

Scientific classification
- Kingdom: Animalia
- Phylum: Bryozoa
- Class: Gymnolaemata
- Order: Cheilostomatida
- Family: Eurystomellidae
- Genus: Integripelta; Gordon, Mawatari & Kajihara, 2002

= Integripelta =

Genus of bryozoans

Integripelta is a genus of bryozoans within the family Eurystomellidae. The genus currently contains 9 species, with the extant members inhabiting waters in the Pacific Ocean.

== Species ==
- Integripelta acanthus Gordon & Rudman, 2006
- Integripelta bilabiata (Hincks, 1884)
- Integripelta japonica Gordon, Mawatari & Kajihara, 2002
- Integripelta meta Seo & Min, 2009
- Integripelta novella Gordon, Mawatari & Kajihara, 2002
- Integripelta sakagamii Grischenko & Gordon, 2004
- Integripelta sextaria Gordon, Mawatari & Kajihara, 2002
- Integripelta shirayamai Gordon, Mawatari & Kajihara, 2002
- Integripelta umbonata Gordon, Mawatari & Kajihara, 2002
