= Epistomiidae =

Scientific classification
- Kingdom: Animalia
- Phylum: Bryozoa
- Class: Gymnolaemata
- Order: Cheilostomatida
- Suborder: Flustrina
- Superfamily: Buguloidea
- Family: Epistomiidae; Gregory, 1893

Family of bryozoans

Epistomiidae is a family of bryozoans belonging to the order Cheilostomatida.

== Genera ==
There are two genera recognised in the family Epistomiidae:

- Epistomia Fleming, 1828
- Synnotum Pieper, 1881
