= Stephanotheca (bryozoan) =

Scientific classification
- Kingdom: Animalia
- Phylum: Bryozoa
- Class: Gymnolaemata
- Order: Cheilostomatida
- Family: Lanceoporidae
- Genus: Stephanotheca; Reverter-Gil, Souto & Fernández-Pulpeiro, 2012

Genus of bryozoans

Stephanotheca is a genus of bryozoans belonging to the family Lanceoporidae.

The species of this genus are found in Europe and Australia.

Species:

- Stephanotheca ambita (Waters, 1889)
- Stephanotheca arrogata (Waters, 1879)
- Stephanotheca bahloo Cumming & Sebastian, 2018
- Stephanotheca barrosoi Reverter-Gil, Souto & Fernández-Pulpeiro, 2012
- Stephanotheca fayalensis (Calvet, 1903)
- Stephanotheca fenestricella Dick & Grischenko, 2016
- Stephanotheca ipsum Cumming, 2015
- Stephanotheca kutyeri Cumming & Sebastian, 2018
- Stephanotheca monoecensis (Calvet, 1927)
- Stephanotheca ochracea (Hincks, 1862)
- Stephanotheca perforata Reverter-Gil, Souto & Fernández-Pulpeiro, 2012
- Stephanotheca romajoyae Cumming, 2015
- Stephanotheca triangulata Reverter-Gil, Souto & Fernández-Pulpeiro, 2012
- Stephanotheca victoriensis Reverter-Gil, Souto & Fernández-Pulpeiro, 2012
- Stephanotheca watersi Reverter-Gil, Souto & Fernández-Pulpeiro, 2012
