= Lekythoporidae =

Scientific classification
- Kingdom: Animalia
- Phylum: Bryozoa
- Class: Gymnolaemata
- Order: Cheilostomatida
- Family: Lekythoporidae

Family of bryozoans

Lekythoporidae is a family of bryozoans belonging to the order Cheilostomatida.

Genera:

- Aulopocella Maplestone, 1903
- Catadysis Canu & Bassler, 1927
- Harpagozoon Gordon, 2009
- Jugescharellina Gordon, 1989
- Lekythopora MacGillivray, 1883
- Orthoporidra Canu & Bassler, 1927
- Poecilopora MacGillivray, 1886
- Terataulopocella Rosso, 2002
- Turritigera Busk, 1884
