= Alysidium =

Alysidium may refer to:

- Alysidium (bryozoan), a genus of bryozoans in the family Alysidiidae
- Alysidium (fungus), a genus of fungi in the family Botryobasidiaceae
