= Membranicellariidae =

Scientific classification
- Kingdom: Animalia
- Phylum: Bryozoa
- Class: Gymnolaemata
- Order: Cheilostomatida
- Family: Membranicellariidae; Levinsen, 1909

Family of bryozoans

Membranicellariidae is a family of bryozoans belonging to the order Cheilostomatida.

== Genera ==
There are two genera recognised in the family Membranicellariidae:

- Cookinella d'Hondt, 1981
- Membranicellaria Levinsen, 1909
