= Mixtopelta =

Scientific classification
- Kingdom: Animalia
- Phylum: Bryozoa
- Class: Gymnolaemata
- Order: Cheilostomatida
- Family: Mixtopeltidae; Gordon, 1994
- Genus: Mixtopelta; Gordon, 1994
- Species: M. indica

Binomial name
- Mixtopelta indica Gordon, 1994

Genus of bryozoans

Mixtopelta is a monotypic genus of bryozoans belonging to the monotypic family Mixtopeltidae. The only species is Mixtopelta indica.
