= Foveolaria =

Foveolaria may refer to:

- Foveolaria (bryozoan), a genus of bryozoans in the family Foveolariidae
- Foveolaria, a genus of plants in the family Styracaceae, synonym of Styrax
- Foveolaria, a genus of plants in the family Elaeocarpaceae, synonym of Sloanea
