= Colatooeciidae =

Scientific classification
- Kingdom: Animalia
- Phylum: Bryozoa
- Class: Gymnolaemata
- Order: Cheilostomatida
- Family: Colatooeciidae

Family of bryozoans

Colatooeciidae is a family of bryozoans belonging to the order Cheilostomatida.

Genera:

- Cigclisula Canu & Bassler, 1927
- Colatooecia Winston, 2005
- Trematooecia Osburn, 1940
