= Inversiulidae =

Scientific classification
- Kingdom: Animalia
- Phylum: Bryozoa
- Class: Gymnolaemata
- Order: Cheilostomatida
- Superfamily: Adeonoidea
- Family: Inversiulidae; Vigneaux, 1949

Genera
- Inversiula Jullien, 1888; Parainversiula López-Gappa, Ezcurra, Schwaha & Pérez, 2023

Family of bryozoans

Inversiulidae is a family of bryozoans in the order Cheilostomatida.

== Description ==
Colonies are often encrusting sheets on shells or rocks. The zooids are characterised by having an operculum that opens in the opposite way to other cheilostome genera; i.e. the hinge is located at the 'top' (towards the growing edge) of the zooid.

== Classification ==
This family includes the following genera:

- Inversiula Jullien, 1888
- Parainversiula López-Gappa, Ezcurra, Schwaha & Pérez, 2023
