= Batoporidae =

Scientific classification
- Kingdom: Animalia
- Phylum: Bryozoa
- Class: Gymnolaemata
- Order: Cheilostomatida
- Family: Batoporidae; Neviani, 1901

Family of bryozoans

Batoporidae is a family of bryozoans belonging to the order Cheilostomatida and was first described in 1901 by Neviani.

Genera:

- Batopora Reuss, 1867
- Lacrimula Cook, 1966
- Ptoboroa Gordon & d'Hondt, 1997
