= Conescharellinidae =

Scientific classification
- Kingdom: Animalia
- Phylum: Bryozoa
- Class: Gymnolaemata
- Order: Cheilostomatida
- Family: Conescharellinidae

Family of bryozoans

Conescharellinidae is a family of bryozoans belonging to the order Cheilostomatida.

Genera:

- Bipora Whitelegge, 1887
- Conescharellina d'Orbigny, 1852
- Crucescharellina Silén, 1947
- Flabellopora d'Orbigny, 1851
- Trochosodon Canu & Bassler, 1927
- Zeuglopora Maplestone, 1909
