= Setosella =

Scientific classification
- Kingdom: Animalia
- Phylum: Bryozoa
- Class: Gymnolaemata
- Order: Cheilostomatida
- Superfamily: Microporoidea
- Family: Setosellidae; Levinsen, 1909
- Genus: Setosella; Hincks, 1877

Family of bryozoans

Setosella is a genus of bryozoans in the order Cheilostomatida. It is the only genus in the monotypic family Setosellidae.

== Species ==
The following species are recognised in the genus Setosella:

- Setosella alfioi Rosso, Di Martino & Gerovasileiou, 2020
- Setosella cavernicola Harmelin, 1977
- Setosella cyclopensis Rosso, Di Martino & Gerovasileiou, 2020
- Setosella folini Jullien, 1882
- Setosella margaritae Reverter-Gil & Souto, 2021
- Setosella rossanae Rosso, Di Martino & Gerovasileiou, 2020
- Setosella spiralis Silén, 1942
- Setosella vulnerata (Busk, 1860)
