= Dhondtiscidae =

Scientific classification
- Kingdom: Animalia
- Phylum: Bryozoa
- Class: Gymnolaemata
- Order: Cheilostomatida
- Family: Dhondtiscidae

Family of bryozoans

Dhondtiscidae is a family of bryozoans belonging to the order Cheilostomatida.

Genera:

- Dhondtiscus Gordon, 1989
