= Mawatarius =

Scientific classification
- Kingdom: Animalia
- Phylum: Bryozoa
- Class: Gymnolaemata
- Order: Cheilostomatida
- Family: Mawatariidae; Gordon, 1990
- Genus: Mawatarius; Gordon, 1990

Genus of bryozoans

Mawatarius is a genus of bryozoans belonging to the monotypic family Mawatariidae.

The species of this genus are found in New Zealand.

Species:

- Mawatarius avilae Figuerola, Gordon & Cristobo, 2018
- Mawatarius inexpectabilis (Gordon, 1985)
- Mawatarius secundus Gordon & d'Hondt, 1997
