= Bifaxariidae =

Scientific classification
- Kingdom: Animalia
- Phylum: Bryozoa
- Class: Gymnolaemata
- Order: Cheilostomatida
- Family: Bifaxariidae

Family of bryozoans

Bifaxariidae is a family of bryozoans belonging to the order Cheilostomatida.

Genera:

- Aberrodomus Gordon, 1988
- Bifaxaria Busk, 1884
- Diplonotos Canu & Bassler, 1930
- Domosclerus Gordon, 1988
- Raxifabia Gordon, 1988
