= Didymosellidae =

Scientific classification
- Kingdom: Animalia
- Phylum: Bryozoa
- Class: Gymnolaemata
- Order: Cheilostomatida
- Family: Didymosellidae

Family of bryozoans

Didymosellidae is a family of bryozoans belonging to the order Cheilostomatida.

Genera:

- Bimicroporella Canu, 1904
- Didymosella Canu & Bassler, 1917
- Tubiporella Levinsen, 1909
