= Petalostegidae =

Scientific classification
- Kingdom: Animalia
- Phylum: Bryozoa
- Class: Gymnolaemata
- Order: Cheilostomatida
- Family: Petalostegidae

Family of bryozoans

Petalostegidae is a family of bryozoans belonging to the order Cheilostomatida.

Genera:

- Chelidozoum Stach, 1935
- Petalostegus Levinsen, 1909
