= Urceoliporidae =

Scientific classification
- Kingdom: Animalia
- Phylum: Bryozoa
- Class: Gymnolaemata
- Order: Cheilostomatida
- Family: Urceoliporidae; Bassler, 1936

Family of bryozoans

Urceoliporidae is a family of bryozoans belonging to the order Cheilostomatida.

Genera:

- Cureolipora Gordon, 2000
- Reciprocus Gordon, 1988
- Urceolipora MacGillivray, 1881
