= Cheiloporinidae =

Scientific classification
- Kingdom: Animalia
- Phylum: Bryozoa
- Class: Gymnolaemata
- Order: Cheilostomatida
- Family: Cheiloporinidae

Family of bryozoans

Cheiloporinidae is a family of bryozoans belonging to the order Cheilostomatida.

Genera:

- Cheilopora Levinsen, 1909
- Cheiloporina Canu & Bassler, 1923
- Crustoporina Guha & Nathan, 1996
- Cyttaridium Harmer, 1957
- Hagiosynodos Bishop & Hayward, 1989
- Pachystomaria MacGillivray, 1895
- Retelepralia Gordon & Arnold, 1998
