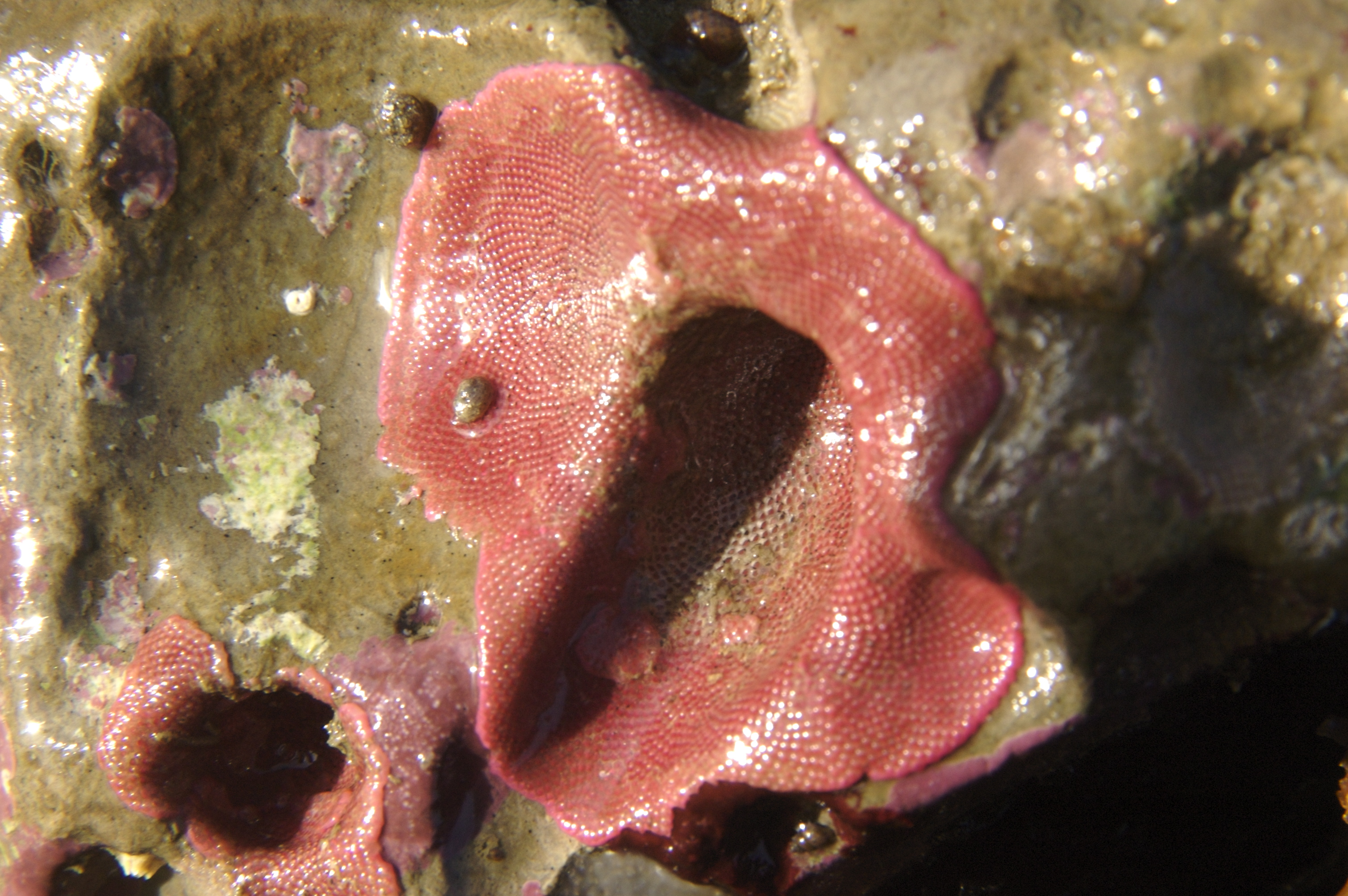
- Integripelta bilabiata

Scientific classification
- Kingdom: Animalia
- Phylum: Bryozoa
- Class: Gymnolaemata
- Order: Cheilostomatida
- Family: Eurystomellidae; Levinsen, 1909

= Eurystomellidae =

Family of bryozoans

Eurystomellidae is a family of bryozoans belonging to the order Cheilostomatida.

Genera:

- Eurystomella Levinsen, 1909
- Integripelta Gordon, Mawatari & Kajihara, 2002
- Selenariopsis Maplestone, 1913
- Zygopalme Gordon, Mawatari & Kajihara, 2002
