= Calwelliidae =

Scientific classification
- Kingdom: Animalia
- Phylum: Bryozoa
- Class: Gymnolaemata
- Order: Cheilostomatida
- Family: Calwelliidae

Family of bryozoans

Calwelliidae is a family of bryozoans belonging to the order Cheilostomatida.

Genera:

- Calwellia Wyville Thomson, 1858
- Ichthyaria Busk, 1884
- Ijimaiellia Gordon, 2009
- Malakosaria Goldstein, 1882
- Onchoporella Busk, 1884
- Onchoporoides Ortmann, 1890
- Wrigiana Gordon & d'Hondt, 1997
