= Alysidiidae =

Scientific classification
- Kingdom: Animalia
- Phylum: Bryozoa
- Class: Gymnolaemata
- Order: Cheilostomatida
- Suborder: Flustrina
- Superfamily: Microporoidea
- Family: Alysidiidae; Levinsen, 1909

Family of bryozoans

Alysidiidae is a family of bryozoans belonging to the order Cheilostomatida.

== Genera ==
There are two genera recognised in the family Alysidiidae:

- Alysidium Busk, 1852
- Catenicula O'Donoghue, 1924
