= Chlidonia =

Scientific classification
- Kingdom: Animalia
- Phylum: Bryozoa
- Class: Gymnolaemata
- Order: Cheilostomatida
- Superfamily: Microporoidea
- Family: Chlidoniidae; Busk, 1884
- Genus: Chlidonia; Lamouroux, 1824

Synonyms
- (Genus): Chlidonibrya Strand, 1928; Cothurnicella Wyville Thomson, 1858

Genus of bryozoans

Chlidonia is a genus of bryozoans belonging to the order Cheilostomatida. It is the only genus in the family Chlidoniidae.
