= Euthyroididae =

Scientific classification
- Kingdom: Animalia
- Phylum: Bryozoa
- Class: Gymnolaemata
- Order: Cheilostomatida
- Family: Euthyroididae

Family of bryozoans

Euthyroididae is a family of bryozoans belonging to the order Cheilostomatida.

Genera:

- Euthyroides Harmer, 1902
