= Chlidoniopsidae =

Scientific classification
- Kingdom: Animalia
- Phylum: Bryozoa
- Class: Gymnolaemata
- Order: Cheilostomatida
- Family: Chlidoniopsidae

Family of bryozoans

Chlidoniopsidae is a family of bryozoans belonging to the order Cheilostomatida.

Genera:

- Celiopsis Zágoršek, Gordon & Vávra, 2015
- Childoniopsis Harmer, 1957
