= Acoraniidae =

Scientific classification
- Kingdom: Animalia
- Phylum: Bryozoa
- Class: Gymnolaemata
- Order: Cheilostomatida
- Family: Acoraniidae

Family of bryozoans

Acoraniidae is a family of bryozoans belonging to the order Cheilostomatida. It was introduced in order to accommodate the new genus Acorania which did not fit, at the time, in any of the described cheilostomes. It was discovered during a deep-water expedition in September 1998 at the Enmedio volcano off the coast of the Canary Islands. Both the family Acoraniidae and the genus Acorania are derived from the name Acoran, a name of Achamán, the supreme god of the Guanches, the native inhabitants of the Canary Islands.

Genera:

- Acorania López-Fé, 2006
