= Phoceanidae =

Scientific classification
- Domain: Eukaryota
- Kingdom: Animalia
- Phylum: Bryozoa
- Class: Gymnolaemata
- Order: Cheilostomatida
- Family: Phoceanidae

Family of bryozoans

Phoceanidae is a family of bryozoans belonging to the order Cheilostomatida.

Genera:

- Phoceana Jullien, 1903
- Sertulipora Harmelin & d'Hondt, 1992
