= Tetraplariidae =

Scientific classification
- Domain: Eukaryota
- Kingdom: Animalia
- Phylum: Bryozoa
- Class: Gymnolaemata
- Order: Cheilostomatida
- Family: Tetraplariidae

Family of bryozoans

Tetraplariidae is a family of bryozoans belonging to the order Cheilostomatida.

Genera:

- Tetraplaria Tenison-Woods, 1879
- Tychinella Zágoršek, 2001
