= Pasytheidae =

Scientific classification
- Kingdom: Animalia
- Phylum: Bryozoa
- Class: Gymnolaemata
- Order: Cheilostomatida
- Family: Pasytheidae

Family of bryozoans

Pasytheidae is a family of bryozoans belonging to the order Cheilostomatida.

Genera:

- Baudina Gordon, 2009
- Dittosaria Busk, 1866
- Eutaleola Vieira & Gordon, 2010
- Gemellipora Smitt, 1873
- Pasythea Lamouroux, 1812
- Tecatia Morris, 1980
- Unifissurinella Poignant, 1991
