= Ascosiidae =

Scientific classification
- Kingdom: Animalia
- Phylum: Bryozoa
- Class: Gymnolaemata
- Order: Cheilostomatida
- Family: Ascosiidae

Family of bryozoans

Ascosiidae is a family of bryozoans belonging to the order Cheilostomatida.

Genera:

- Ascosia Jullien, 1882
- Bragella Di Martino, Taylor, Cotton & Pearson, 2017
- Fedora Jullien, 1882
- Kionidella Koschinsky, 1885
- Stenosipora Canu & Bassler, 1927
