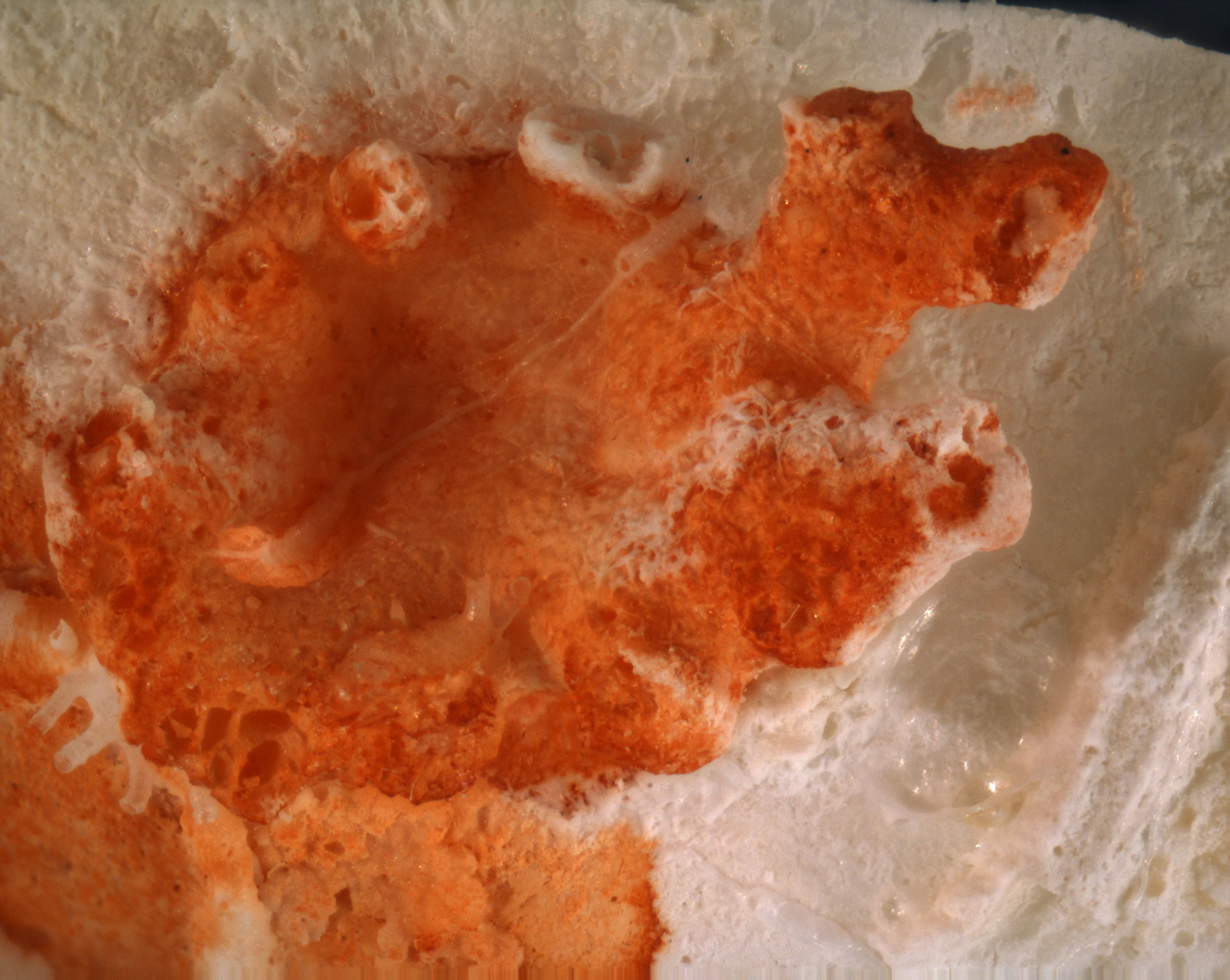
- Aetea sp.

Scientific classification
- Kingdom: Animalia
- Phylum: Bryozoa
- Class: Gymnolaemata
- Order: Cheilostomatida
- Family: Aeteidae
- Genus: Aetea; Lamouroux, 1812

= Aetea =

Genus of bryozoans

Aetea is a genus of bryozoans belonging to the family Aeteidae.

The genus has cosmopolitan distribution.

Species:

- Aetea americana d'Orbigny, 1851
- Aetea anguina (Linnaeus, 1758)
- Aetea arcuata Winston & Hayward, 2012
- Aetea australis Jullien, 1888
- Aetea boninensis Silén, 1941
- Aetea crosslandi Waters, 1910
- Aetea cultrata Vieira, Almeida & Winston, 2016
- Aetea curta Jullien, 1888
- Aetea dilatata (Busk, 1851)
- Aetea lepadiformis Waters, 1906
- Aetea ligulata Busk, 1852
- Aetea lineata Jullien, 1882
- Aetea lingulata Busk, 1852
- Aetea longicollis (Jullien, 1903)
- Aetea paraligulata Soule, Soule & Chaney, 1995
- Aetea pseudoanguina Soule, Soule & Chaney, 1995
- Aetea sica (Couch, 1844)
- Aetea truncata (Landsborough, 1852)
