= Pollicipora =

Scientific classification
- Kingdom: Animalia
- Phylum: Bryozoa
- Class: Gymnolaemata
- Order: Cheilostomatida
- Family: Polliciporidae; Moyano, 2000
- Genus: Pollicipora; Moyano, 2000
- Species: P. fucata

Binomial name
- Pollicipora fucata Moyano, 2000

Genus of bryozoans

Pollicipora is a monotypic genus of bryozoans belonging to the monotypic family Polliciporidae. The only species is Pollicipora fucata.
