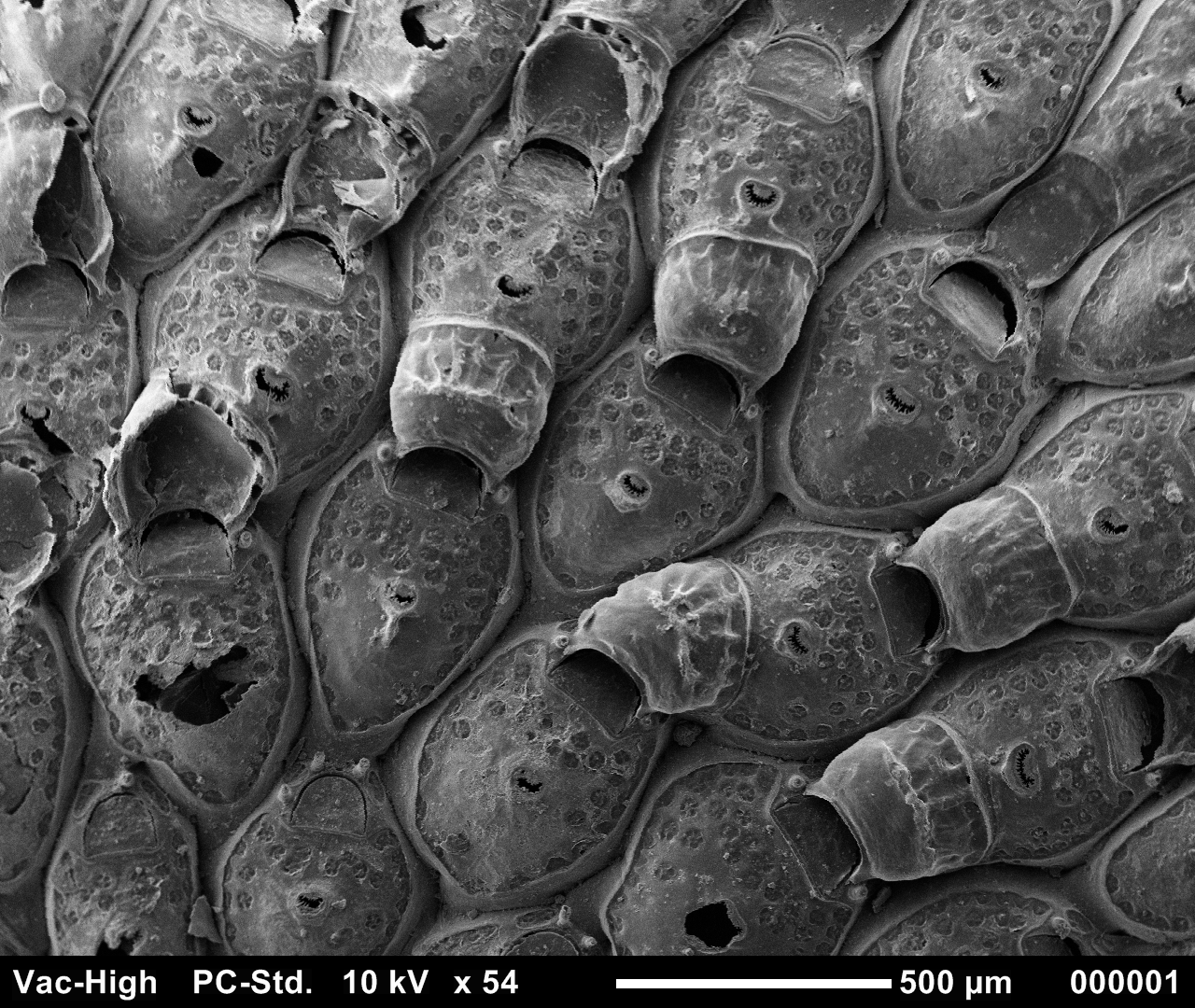
- Fenestrulina delicia

Scientific classification
- Kingdom: Animalia
- Phylum: Bryozoa
- Class: Gymnolaemata
- Order: Cheilostomatida
- Family: Fenestrulinidae; Jullien, 1888
- Genus: Fenestrulina; Jullien, 1888

= Fenestrulina =

Genus of moss animals

Fenestrulina is a genus within the bryozoan order Cheilostomatida. It is the only member of the family Fenestrulinidae. It has a world-wide distribution.

== Species ==
As accepted by GBIF;

- Fenestrulina ampla Canu & Bassler, 1928
- Fenestrulina amplissima Hayward, 1980
- Fenestrulina antarctica Hayward & Thorpe, 1989
- Fenestrulina asperula Hayward & Winston, 2011
- Fenestrulina asturiasensis Alvarez, 1992
- Fenestrulina barrosoi Alvarez, 1993
- Fenestrulina blaggae (Soule, Soule & Chaney, 1995)
- Fenestrulina bullata Harmer, 1957
- Fenestrulina candida (MacGillivray, 1860)
- Fenestrulina caseola Hayward, 1988
- Fenestrulina catastictos Gordon, 1984
- Fenestrulina cervicornis Hayward & Ryland, 1990
- Fenestrulina commensalis Vieira & Stampar, 2014
- Fenestrulina constellata Winston, Vieira & Woollacott, 2014
- Fenestrulina cornuta (d'Orbigny, 1841)
- Fenestrulina crystallina Hayward & Ryland, 1990
- Fenestrulina curviscutum Figuerola, Gordon & Cristobo, 2018
- Fenestrulina delicia Winston, Hayward & Craig, 2000
- Fenestrulina dictyota Hayward & Ryland, 1990
- Fenestrulina diplopunctata Hu, 1986
- Fenestrulina disjuncta (Hincks, 1885)
- Fenestrulina dupla Hayward & Ryland, 1990
- Fenestrulina elevora Florence, Hayward & Gibbons, 2007
- Fenestrulina eopacifica (Soule, Soule & Chaney, 1995)
- Fenestrulina epiphytica Hayward & Ryland, 1995
- Fenestrulina exigua (Waters, 1904)
- Fenestrulina fahimii Abbas & El-Senoussi, 1979
- Fenestrulina farnsworthi Soule, Soule & Chaney, 1995
- Fenestrulina fritilla Hayward & Ryland, 1990
- Fenestrulina gelasinoides Gordon, 1984
- Fenestrulina harmelini David, Mongereau & Pouyet, 1972
- Fenestrulina harmeri Winston & Heimberg, 1986
- Fenestrulina horrida Moyano, 1985
- Fenestrulina incompta Gordon, 1984
- Fenestrulina incusa Hayward & Ryland, 1990
- Fenestrulina indigena Hayward & Cook, 1983
- Fenestrulina inesae Souto, Reverter-Gil & Fernández-Pulpeiro, 2010
- Fenestrulina infundibulipora Canu & Bassler, 1929
- Fenestrulina irregularis (Maplestone, 1909)
- Fenestrulina jocunda Hayward & Ryland, 1990
- Fenestrulina juani Souto, Reverter-Gil & Fernández-Pulpeiro, 2010
- Fenestrulina littoralis Gordon, 2009
- Fenestrulina majuscula Hayward, 1980
- Fenestrulina malusii (Audouin, 1826)
- Fenestrulina marioni Hayward & Ryland, 1990
- Fenestrulina microstoma Moyano, 1983
- Fenestrulina miramara (Soule, Soule & Chaney, 1995)
- Fenestrulina morrisae (Soule, Soule & Chaney, 1995)
- Fenestrulina multicava Gordon, 1989
- Fenestrulina multiflorum Figuerola, Gordon & Cristobo, 2018
- Fenestrulina mutabilis (Hastings, 1932)
- Fenestrulina napierensis (Brown, 1952)
- Fenestrulina orientalis Liu & Liu, 2001
- Fenestrulina parvipora (Waters, 1904)
- Fenestrulina pauciporosa Winston & Jackson, 2021
- Fenestrulina personata (MacGillivray, 1883)
- Fenestrulina porosa Canu & Bassler, 1923
- Fenestrulina proxima (Waters, 1904)
- Fenestrulina pulchra Gordon, 1984
- Fenestrulina pumicosa Branch & Hayward, 2005
- Fenestrulina reticularis Liu & Hu, 1991
- Fenestrulina reticulata Powell, 1967
- Fenestrulina rugula Hayward & Ryland, 1990
- Fenestrulina sinica Liu & Liu, 2001
- Fenestrulina specca Gordon, 1989
- Fenestrulina thyreophora (Busk, 1857)
- Fenestrulina tongassorum (Dick, Grischenko & Mawatari, 2005)
- Fenestrulina umbonata O'Donoghue & O'Donoghue, 1926
- Fenestrulina vivianii Moyano, 1991
