= Lanceoporidae =

Scientific classification
- Domain: Eukaryota
- Kingdom: Animalia
- Phylum: Bryozoa
- Class: Gymnolaemata
- Order: Cheilostomatida
- Family: Lanceoporidae

Synonyms
- Parmulariidae

Family of bryozoans

Lanceoporidae is a family of bryozoans belonging to the order Cheilostomatida.

Genera:

- Calyptotheca Harmer, 1957
- Emballotheca Levinsen, 1909
- Lanceopora d'Orbigny, 1851
- Stephanotheca Reverter-Gil, Souto & Fernández-Pulpeiro, 2012
