= Hincksiporidae =

Scientific classification
- Kingdom: Animalia
- Phylum: Bryozoa
- Class: Gymnolaemata
- Order: Cheilostomatida
- Family: Hincksiporidae

Family of bryozoans

Hincksiporidae is a family of bryozoans belonging to the order Cheilostomatida.

Genera:

- Hincksipora Osburn, 1952
