= Orbituliporidae =

Scientific classification
- Kingdom: Animalia
- Phylum: Bryozoa
- Class: Gymnolaemata
- Order: Cheilostomatida
- Family: Orbituliporidae

Family of bryozoans

Orbituliporidae is a family of bryozoans belonging to the order Cheilostomatida.

== Genera ==
Genera:

- Atactoporidra Canu & Bassler, 1931
- Batoporella Héjjas, 1894
- Bicupularia Reuss, 1864
