= Trypostegidae =

Scientific classification
- Kingdom: Animalia
- Phylum: Bryozoa
- Class: Gymnolaemata
- Order: Cheilostomatida
- Family: Trypostegidae

Family of bryozoans

Trypostegidae is a family of bryozoans belonging to the order Cheilostomatida.

Trypostegidae fossil records are mainly found on the east coast of the United States, fossils have also been found all around the world, their first recorded appearance was between 55.8 - 48.6 Ma in the Eocene period. They were blind suspension feeders that bred oviparously.

== Genera ==
Genera:

- Boreas Morris, 1980
- Boreasina Voigt & Hillmer, 1983
- Diplotresis Canu & Bassler, 1933
