= Cyclicoporidae =

Scientific classification
- Kingdom: Animalia
- Phylum: Bryozoa
- Class: Gymnolaemata
- Order: Cheilostomatida
- Family: Cyclicoporidae

Family of bryozoans

Cyclicoporidae is a family of bryozoans belonging to the order Cheilostomatida.

Genera:

- Cyclicopora Hincks, 1884
