= Hiantoporidae =

Scientific classification
- Kingdom: Animalia
- Phylum: Bryozoa
- Class: Gymnolaemata
- Order: Cheilostomatida
- Family: Hiantoporidae; Gregory, 1893

Family of bryozoans

Hiantoporidae is a family of bryozoans belonging to the order Cheilostomatida.

== Genera ==
There are two genera recognised in the family Hiantoporidae:

- Hiantopora MacGillivray, 1887
- Tremopora Ortmann, 1890
