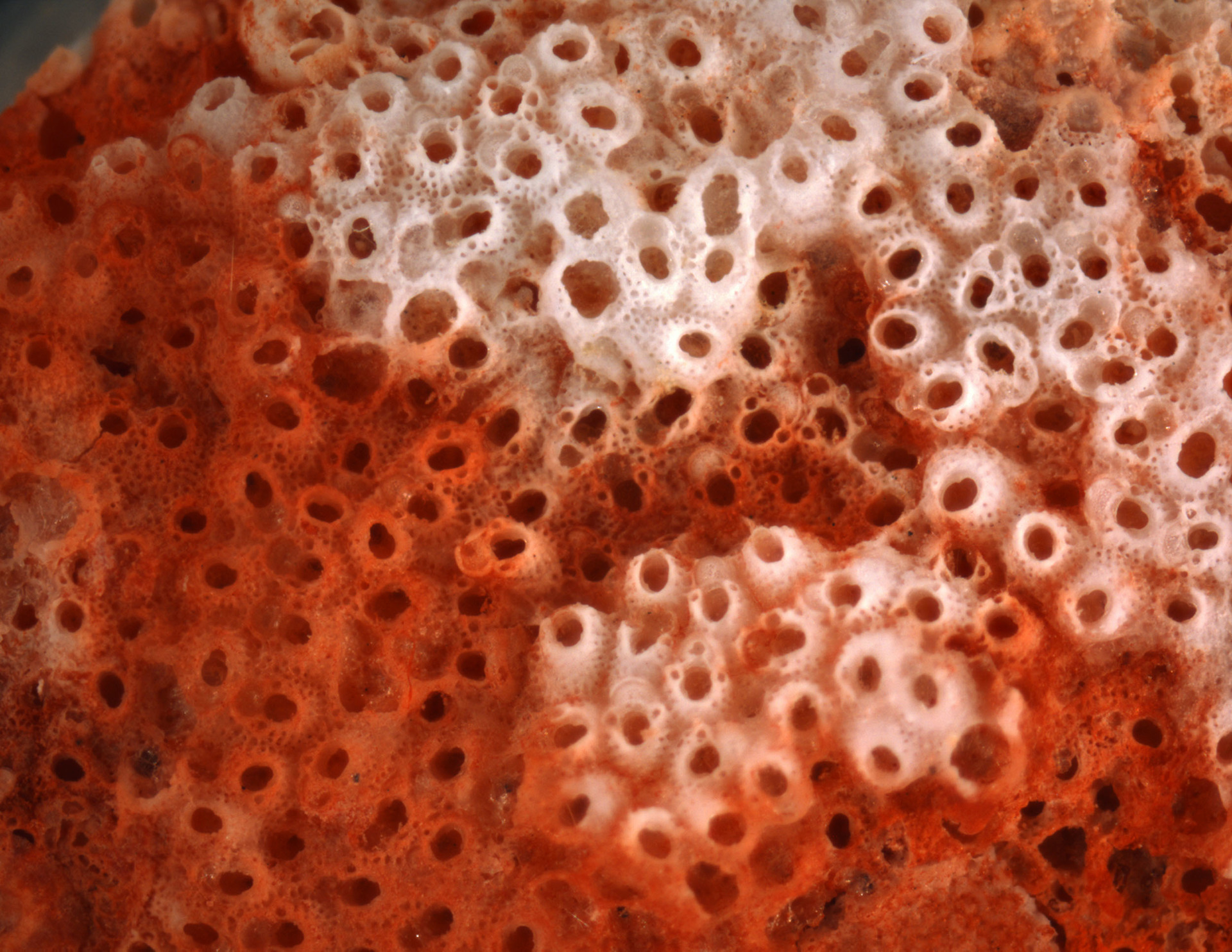

Scientific classification
- Kingdom: Animalia
- Phylum: Bryozoa
- Class: Gymnolaemata
- Order: Cheilostomatida
- Family: Teuchoporidae

= Teuchoporidae =

Family of bryozoans

Teuchoporidae is a family of bryozoans belonging to the order Cheilostomatida.

Genera:

- Coleopora Canu & Bassler, 1927
- Lagenicella Cheetham & Sandberg, 1964
- Laginipora
- Teuchopora Neviani, 1895
