= Phorioppniidae =

Scientific classification
- Domain: Eukaryota
- Kingdom: Animalia
- Phylum: Bryozoa
- Class: Gymnolaemata
- Order: Cheilostomatida
- Family: Phorioppniidae

Family of bryozoans

Phorioppniidae is a family of bryozoans belonging to the order Cheilostomatida.

Genera:

- Oppiphorina Gordon & d'Hondt, 1997
- Phorioppnia Gordon & d'Hondt, 1997
- Punctiscutella Gordon & d'Hondt, 1997
- Quadriscutella Bock & Cook, 1993
