= Haplopomidae =

Scientific classification
- Kingdom: Animalia
- Phylum: Bryozoa
- Class: Gymnolaemata
- Order: Cheilostomatida
- Family: Haplopomidae

Family of bryozoans

Haplopomidae is a family of bryozoans belonging to the order Cheilostomatida.

Genera:

- Haplopoma Levinsen, 1909
