= Actisecidae =

Scientific classification
- Kingdom: Animalia
- Phylum: Bryozoa
- Class: Gymnolaemata
- Order: Cheilostomatida
- Family: Actisecidae

Family of bryozoans

Actisecidae is a family of bryozoans belonging to the order Cheilostomatida.

Genera:

- Actisecos Canu & Bassler, 1927
