= Euthyrisellidae =

Scientific classification
- Kingdom: Animalia
- Phylum: Bryozoa
- Class: Gymnolaemata
- Order: Cheilostomatida
- Family: Euthyrisellidae

Family of bryozoans

Euthyrisellidae is a family of bryozoans belonging to the order Cheilostomatida.

Genera:

- Euthyrisell Bassler, 1936
- Neoeuthyris Bretnall, 1921
- Pleurotoichus Levinsen, 1909
- Pseudoplatyglena Gordon & d'Hondt, 1997
- Tropidozoum Harmer, 1957
