= Crepidacanthidae =

Scientific classification
- Kingdom: Animalia
- Phylum: Bryozoa
- Class: Gymnolaemata
- Order: Cheilostomatida
- Family: Crepidacanthidae

Family of bryozoans

Crepidacanthidae is a family of bryozoans belonging to the order Cheilostomatida.

Genera:

- Crepidacantha Levinsen, 1909
