= Pseudolepralia =

Scientific classification
- Kingdom: Animalia
- Phylum: Bryozoa
- Class: Gymnolaemata
- Order: Cheilostomatida
- Family: Pseudolepraliidae; Silén, 1942
- Genus: Pseudolepralia; Silén, 1941
- Species: P. ellisinae

Binomial name
- Pseudolepralia ellisinae Silén, 1941

Genus of bryozoans

Pseudolepralia is a monotypic genus of bryozoans belonging to the monotypic family Pseudolepraliidae. The only species is Pseudolepralia ellisinae.
