= Lunulariidae =

Lunularia

Scientific classification
- Kingdom: Animalia
- Phylum: Bryozoa
- Class: Gymnolaemata
- Order: Cheilostomatida
- Family: Lunulariidae; Levinsen, 1909
- Genus: Lunularia (bryozoan); Busk, 1884

Family of bryozoans

Lunulariidae is a family of bryozoans belonging to the order Cheilostomatida. It is monotypic, being represented by the single genus Lunularia.

== Species ==
The following species are recognised in the genus Lunularia:

- †Lunularia beisselii (Marsson, 1887)
- Lunularia capulus (Busk, 1852)
- †Lunularia cretacea (Defrance, 1823)
- †Lunularia declivis (Brydone, 1911)
- †Lunularia excavata (Hennig, 1892)
- †Lunularia marssoni (Brydone, 1911)
- †Lunularia parvicella (Tenison Woods, 1880)
- †Lunularia patelliformis (Marsson, 1887)
- †Lunularia punctata (Leymerie, 1845)
- Lunularia repanda (Maplestone, 1904)
- †Lunularia reversa (Ulrich, 1901)
- †Lunularia sella (Marsson, 1887)
- †Lunularia spiralis (Marsson, 1887)
- †Lunularia transiens (Gregory, 1893)
