= Savignyellidae =

Scientific classification
- Kingdom: Animalia
- Phylum: Bryozoa
- Class: Gymnolaemata
- Order: Cheilostomatida
- Family: Savignyellidae

Family of bryozoans

Savignyellidae is a family of bryozoans belonging to the order Cheilostomatida.

Genera:

- Enteleia
- Halysisis Norman, 1909
- Savignyella Levinsen, 1909
