= Hippaliosinidae =

Scientific classification
- Domain: Eukaryota
- Kingdom: Animalia
- Phylum: Bryozoa
- Class: Gymnolaemata
- Order: Cheilostomatida
- Family: Hippaliosinidae

Family of bryozoans

Hippaliosinidae is a family of bryozoans belonging to the order Cheilostomatida.

Genera:

- Gemelliporidra Canu & Bassler, 1927
- Hippaliosina Canu, 1919
