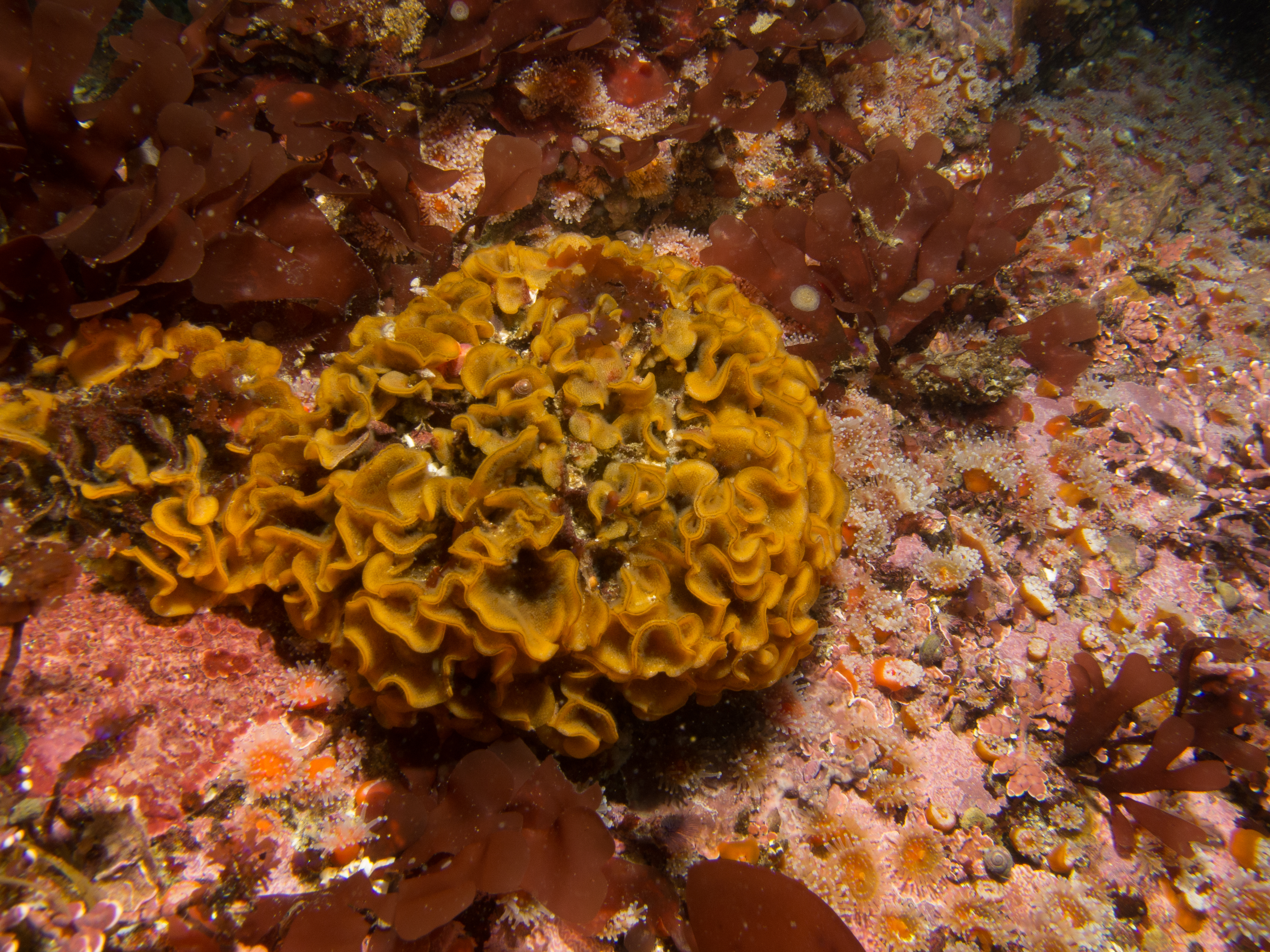
- Fluted Bryozoan (Hippodiplosia insculpta)

Scientific classification
- Kingdom: Animalia
- Phylum: Bryozoa
- Class: Gymnolaemata
- Order: Cheilostomatida
- Family: Pacificincolidae

= Pacificincolidae =

Family of bryozoans

Pacificincolidae is a family of bryozoans belonging to the order Cheilostomatida.

Genera:

- Burdwoodipora López Gappa, Liuzzi & Zelaya, 2017
- Pacificincola Liu & Liu, 1999
- Primavelans De Blauwe, 2006
