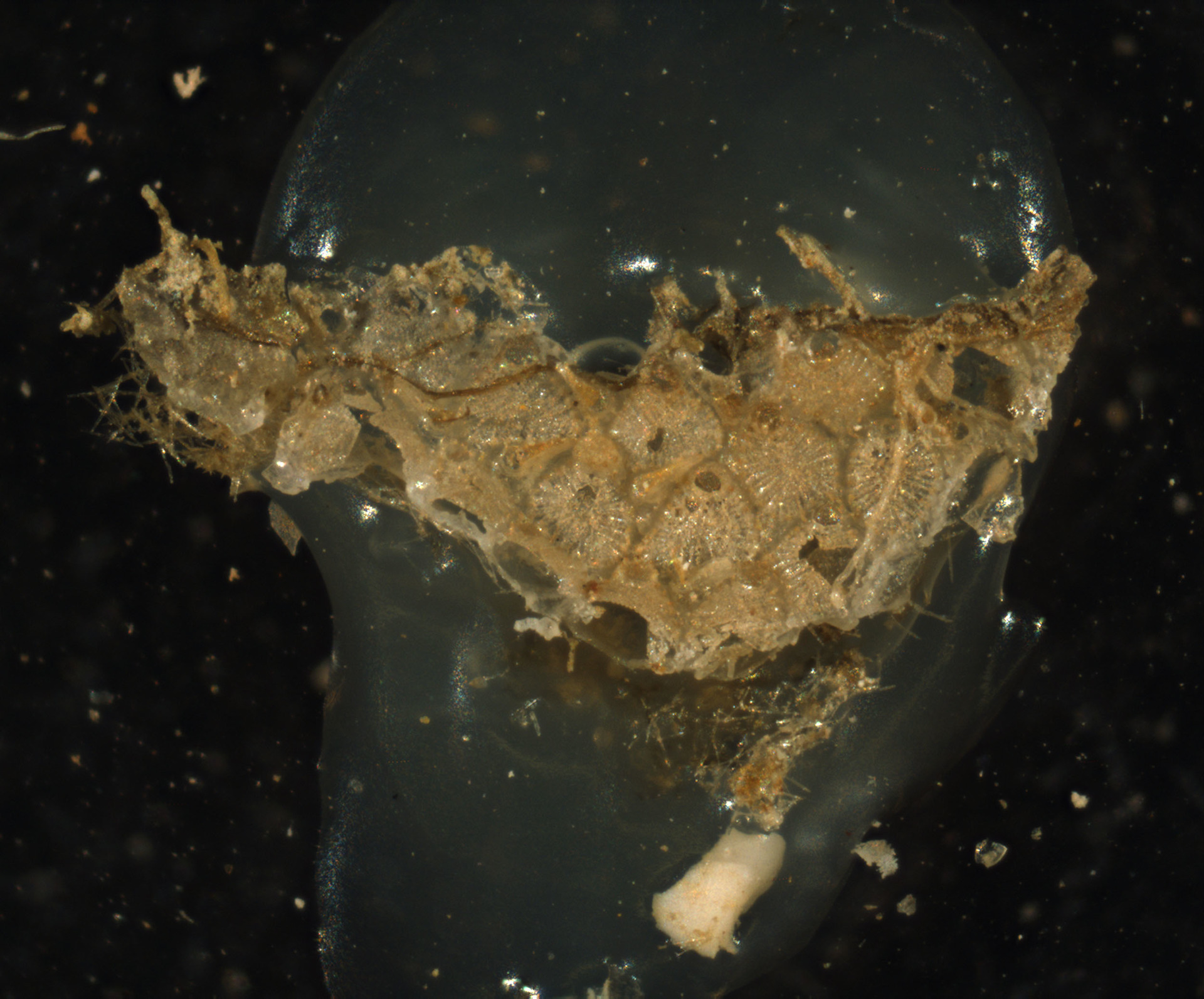
- An Umbonula

Scientific classification
- Kingdom: Animalia
- Phylum: Bryozoa
- Class: Gymnolaemata
- Order: Cheilostomatida
- Family: Umbonulidae

Synonyms
- Desmacystidae

= Umbonulidae =

Family of bryozoans

Umbonulidae is a family of bryozoans belonging to the order Cheilostomatida.

Genera:

- Aegyptopora Ziko, 1988
- Astochoporella Hayward & Thorpe, 1988
- Desmacystis Osburn, 1950
- Escharopsis Verrill, 1879
- Oshurkovia Grischenko & Mawatari, 2005
- Posterula Jullien, 1903
- Rhamphostomella Lorenz, 1886
- Scorpiodina Jullien, 1886
- Trigonopora Maplestone, 1902
- Umbonula Hincks, 1880
