= Euoplozoum =

Scientific classification
- Kingdom: Animalia
- Phylum: Bryozoa
- Class: Gymnolaemata
- Order: Cheilostomatida
- Superfamily: Buguloidea
- Family: Euoplozoidae; Harmer, 1926
- Genus: Euoplozoum; Harmer, 1923
- Species: E. cirratum

Binomial name
- Euoplozoum cirratum (Busk, 1884)

Family of bryozoans

Euoplozoum is a genus of bryozoans in the order Cheilostomatida. It is the only genus in the monotypic family Euoplozoidae. The genus Euoplozoum is also monotypic, being represented by the single species Euoplozoum cirratum.
