= Foveolariidae =

Scientific classification
- Kingdom: Animalia
- Phylum: Bryozoa
- Class: Gymnolaemata
- Order: Cheilostomatida
- Suborder: Flustrina
- Superfamily: Calloporoidea
- Family: Foveolariidae; Gordon & Winston, 2005

Family of bryozoans

Foveolariidae is a family of bryozoans belonging to the order Cheilostomatida.

== Genera ==
The following genera are recognised in the family Foveolariidae:

- Amplexicamera Winston, 2005
- Dactylostega Hayward & Cook, 1983
- Foveolaria Busk, 1884
- Mangana Gordon, 2014
- Odontionella Canu & Bassler, 1917
- †Protofoveolaria Håkansson, Gordon & Taylor, 2024
