= Eminooeciidae =

Scientific classification
- Kingdom: Animalia
- Phylum: Bryozoa
- Class: Gymnolaemata
- Order: Cheilostomatida
- Family: Eminooeciidae

Family of bryozoans

Eminooeciidae is a family of bryozoans belonging to the order Cheilostomatida.

Genera:

- Eminooecia Hayward & Thorpe, 1988
- Isoschizoporella Rogick, 1960
- Macrocamera Gordon & d'Hondt, 1997
