= Scrupariina =

Scrupariina Temporal range: Late Jurassic–Recent

Scientific classification
- Domain: Eukaryota
- Kingdom: Animalia
- Phylum: Bryozoa
- Class: Gymnolaemata
- Order: Cheilostomatida
- Suborder: Scrupariina; Silén, 1941

Suborder of moss animals

Scrupariina is a suborder under order Cheilostomatida. The structure of the individual zooids is generally simple, with an uncalcified, flexible frontal wall. The obsolete sub-order Anasca previously included the members of this sub-order before being deprecated.
