= Echinovadomidae =

Scientific classification
- Kingdom: Animalia
- Phylum: Bryozoa
- Class: Gymnolaemata
- Order: Cheilostomatida
- Family: Echinovadomidae

Family of bryozoans

Echinovadomidae is a family of bryozoans belonging to the order Cheilostomatida.

Genera:

- Echinovadoma Tilbrook, Hayward & Gordon, 2001
