= Jubella =

Scientific classification
- Kingdom: Animalia
- Phylum: Bryozoa
- Class: Gymnolaemata
- Order: Cheilostomatida
- Superfamily: Buguloidea
- Family: Jubellidae; Reverter-Gil & Fernández-Pulpeiro, 2001
- Genus: Jubella; Jullien, 1882
- Species: J. enucleata

Binomial name
- Jubella enucleata Jullien, 1882

Family of bryozoans

Jubella is a genus of bryozoans in the order Cheilostomatida. It is the only genus in the monotypic family Jubellidae. The genus is also itself monotypic, being represented by the single species Jubella enucleata.
