= Chorizoporidae =

Scientific classification
- Kingdom: Animalia
- Phylum: Bryozoa
- Class: Gymnolaemata
- Order: Cheilostomatida
- Suborder: Flustrina
- Family: Chorizoporidae

Family of bryozoans

Chorizoporidae is a family of bryozoans belonging to the order Cheilostomatida.

Genera:

- Chorizopora Hincks, 1879
- Costulostega Tilbrook, 2006
