= Vicidae =

Scientific classification
- Kingdom: Animalia
- Phylum: Bryozoa
- Class: Gymnolaemata
- Order: Cheilostomatida
- Family: Vicidae; Gordon, 1988

Family of bryozoans

Vicidae is a family of bryozoans belonging to the order Cheilostomatida.

Genera:

- Cyclostomella Ortmann, 1890
- Vix Gordon, 1988
