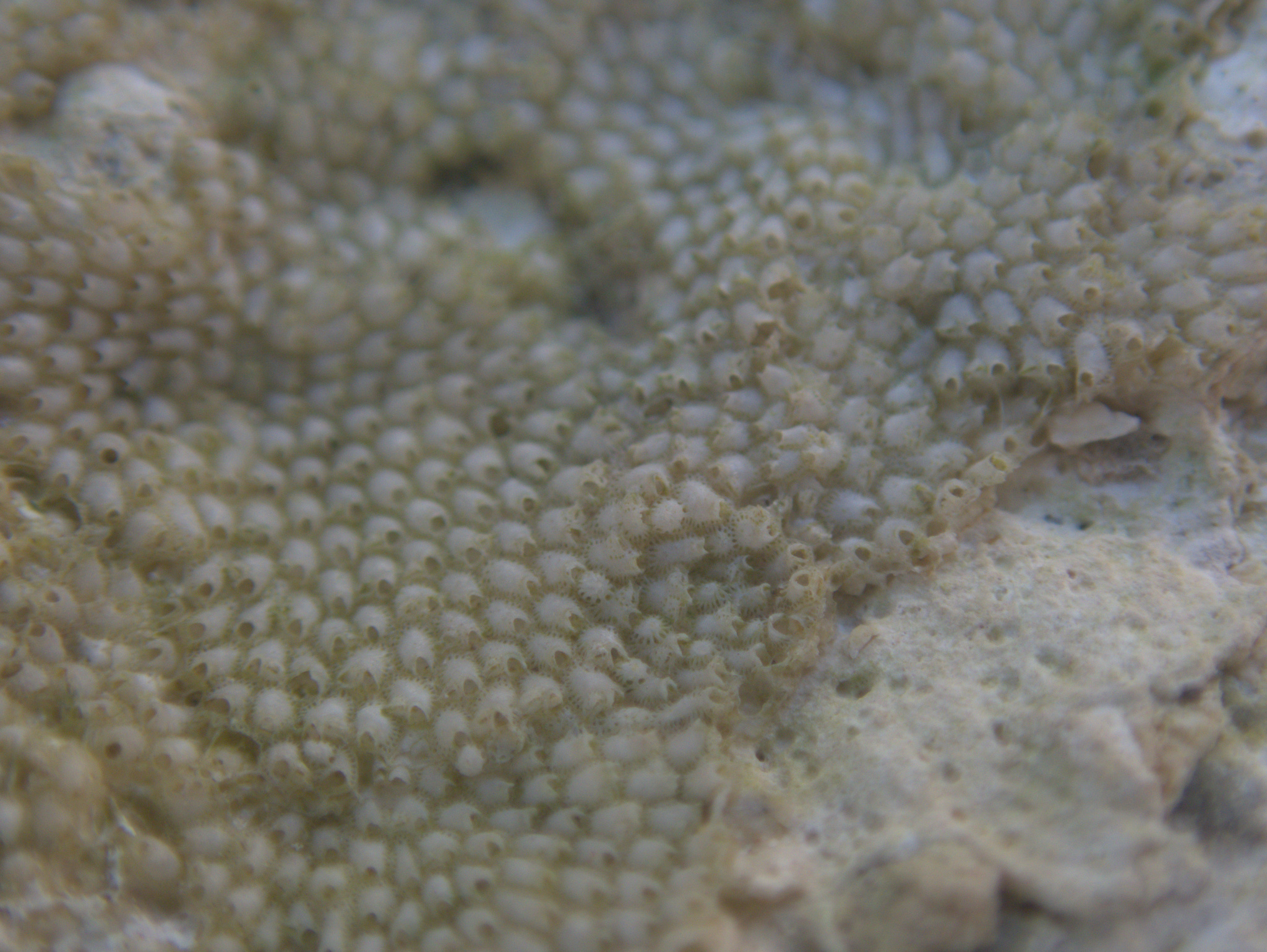
- Colony of Escharoides angela skeletons

Scientific classification
- Kingdom: Animalia
- Phylum: Bryozoa
- Class: Gymnolaemata
- Order: Cheilostomatida
- Family: Exochellidae; Bassler, 1935

= Exochellidae =

Family of bryozoans

Exochellidae is a family of bryozoans belonging to the order Cheilostomatida.

Genera:

- Escharoides Milne Edwards, 1836
- Exochella Jullien, 1888
