= Jaculinidae =

Scientific classification
- Kingdom: Animalia
- Phylum: Bryozoa
- Class: Gymnolaemata
- Order: Cheilostomatida
- Family: Jaculinidae

Family of bryozoans

Jaculinidae is a family of bryozoans belonging to the order Cheilostomatida.

Genera:

- Jaculina Jullien, 1903
- Pirabasoporella Zágoršek, Ramalho, Berning & Araújo Távora, 2014
