= Inovicellina =

Inovicellina Temporal range: Pliocene–recent

Scientific classification
- Domain: Eukaryota
- Kingdom: Animalia
- Phylum: Bryozoa
- Class: Gymnolaemata
- Order: Cheilostomatida; Jullien, 1888
- Suborder: Inovicellina; Smitt, 1868

Genera
- Aetea; Callaetea

Suborder of moss animals

Inovicellina is a suborder under order Cheilostomatida. It includes two genera, Aetea and Callaetea. The colony structure consists of tubular encrusting zooids, with an erect column at one end opening in the orifice.
