= Escharellidae =

Scientific classification
- Kingdom: Animalia
- Phylum: Bryozoa
- Class: Gymnolaemata
- Order: Cheilostomatida
- Family: Escharellidae

Family of bryozoans

Escharellidae is a family of bryozoans belonging to the order Cheilostomatida.

Genera:

- Bulbipora MacGillivray, 1895
- Lapralioides Kluge, 1962
