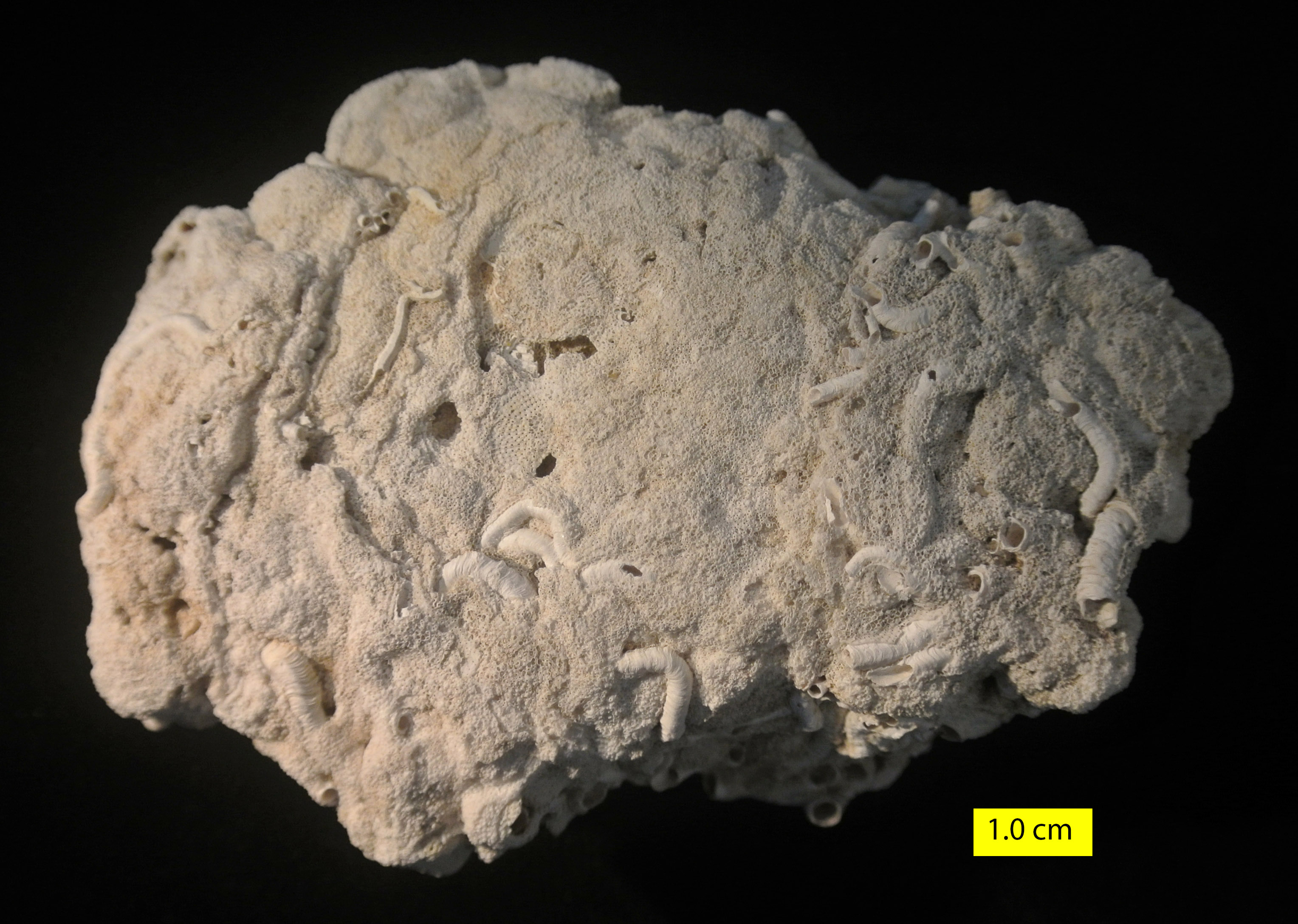
- Schizoporella with serpulid tubes; Cape Cod Bay, Duck Creek, near Wellfleet, Massachusetts.

Scientific classification
- Kingdom: Animalia
- Phylum: Bryozoa
- Class: Gymnolaemata
- Order: Cheilostomatida; Busk, 1852

Suborders
- Aeteina; Belluloporina; Cheilostomatida incertae sedis; Flustrina; Inovicellina; Malacostegina; Membraniporina; Scrupariina; Tendrina; Thalamoporellina

Synonyms
- Anasca: synonym of Flustrina; Acophora: synonym of Flustrina; Ascophorina: synonym of Flustrina; Neocheilostomatina: synonym of Flustrina

= Cheilostomatida =

Cheilostomatida Temporal range: Late Jurassic–Recent

Order of moss animals

Cheilostomatida, also called Cheilostomata, is an order of Bryozoa in the class Gymnolaemata.

They are exclusively marine, colonial invertebrate animals. Cheilostome colonies are composed of calcium carbonate and grow on a variety of surfaces, including rocks, shells, seagrass and kelps. The colony shapes range from simple encrusting sheets to erect branching and even unattached forms. As in other bryozoan groups, each colony is composed of a few to thousands of individual polypides. Each individual has a U-shaped gut, and no respiratory or circulatory system. Unique among bryozoans, cheilostome polypides are housed in a box-shaped zooids, which do not grow larger once the zooid is mature. The opening through which the polypide protrudes is protected by a calcareous or chitinous lidlike structure, an operculum. Cheilostomes possess avicularia, which have modified the operculum into a range of mandibles (possibly for defense) or hair-like setae (possibly for cleaning).

The cheilostomes are the most abundant and varied of modern bryozoans. The classification in suborders is based upon frontal calcification and the mechanism of lophophore protrusion.

== Evolution ==
Cheilostomes first appeared in the Late Jurassic (Pyriporopsis) but diversified very slowly during the Early Cretaceous, with only 1 family known up to the Albian. During the Late Cretaceous, cheilostomes diversified rapidly to reach a level of more than 20 families in the Maastrichtian, replacing cyclostomes as the dominant group of bryozoans. At the same time new forms evolved which partly or fully used aragonite instead of calcite in their exoskeleton. This diversification is thought to be a consequence of the evolution of a new larval type. Though the Cretaceous–Paleogene extinction event had some impact on genetic diversity, the rapid diversification continued into the Eocene, then apparently reaching a plateau of about 50 families up to the Holocene.

Most species incubate their offspring in brood chambers which has evolved independently at least 10 times in the order.
