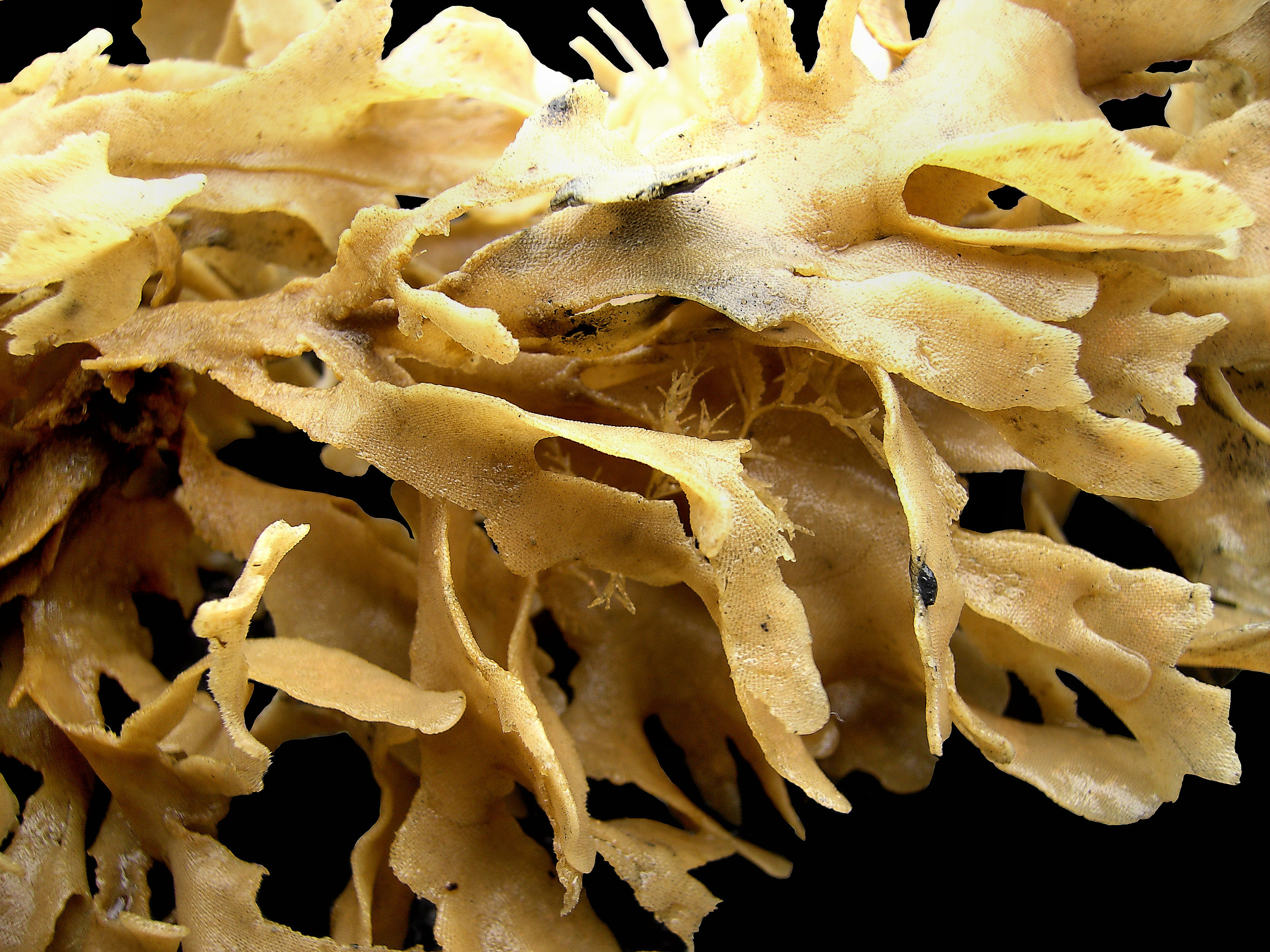
- Flustra foliacea

Scientific classification
- Kingdom: Animalia
- Phylum: Bryozoa
- Class: Gymnolaemata; Allman, 1856

Orders
- See text

= Gymnolaemata =

Class of moss animals

Gymnolaemata are a class of bryozoans. Gymnolaemata are sessile, mostly marine organisms and grow on the surfaces of rocks, kelp, and in some cases on animals, like fish. Zooids are cylindrical or flattened. The lophophore is protruded by action of muscles pulling on the frontal wall. This order includes the majority of living bryozoan species.

== Orders ==
- Cheilostomatida Busk, 1852
- Ctenostomatida Busk, 1852
