= 2015 in bryozoan paleontology =

Paleontology or palaeontology is the study of prehistoric life forms on Earth through the examination of plant and animal fossils. This includes the study of body fossils, tracks (ichnites), burrows, cast-off parts, fossilised feces (coprolites), palynomorphs and chemical residues. Because humans have encountered fossils for millennia, paleontology has a long history both before and after becoming formalized as a science. This article records significant discoveries and events related to paleontology that occurred or were published in the year 2015.

Name	Novelty	Status	Authors	Age	Unit	Location	Notes	Images
Acantholunaria	Gen. et sp. nov	Valid	Ernst, Munnecke & Oswald	Silurian (early Wenlock)		Sweden	A cystoporate bryozoan. The type species is Acantholunaria expansa.	
Adeonellopsis incompta	Sp. nov	Valid	Gordon & Taylor	Early Eocene	Tumaio Limestone	New Zealand	An adeonid cheilostome bryozoan, a species of Adeonellopsis.	
Amphiblestrum paleogenicum	Sp. nov	Valid	Gordon & Taylor	Early Eocene	Tumaio Limestone	New Zealand	A calloporid cheilostome bryozoan, a species of Amphiblestrum.	
Amplexopora crassiparietum	Sp. nov	Valid	Ernst & Nakrem	Silurian (Wenlock)	Steinsfjorden Formation	Norway	An amplexoporid trepostome bryozoan, a species of Amplexopora.	
Amplexopora evae	Sp. nov	Valid	Ernst & Nakrem	Silurian (Wenlock)	Steinsfjorden Formation	Norway	An amplexoporid trepostome bryozoan, a species of Amplexopora.	
Andreella dubia	Sp. nov	Valid	Gordon & Taylor	Early Eocene	Tumaio Limestone	New Zealand	A microporid cheilostome bryozoan, a species of Andreella.	
Anaphragma undulata	Sp. nov	Valid	Jiménez-Sánchez, Vennin & Villas	Ordovician (late Katian)		Morocco	A trepostomate bryozoan, a species of Anaphragma.	
Aostipora elongata	Sp. nov	Valid	Jiménez-Sánchez in Jiménez-Sánchez, Villas & Vennin	Ordovician (late Katian)	Khabt-el-Hajar Formation	Morocco	A trepostomate bryozoan, a species of Aostipora.	
Arachnopusia dimorpha	Sp. nov	Valid	Gordon & Taylor	Early Eocene	Tumaio Limestone	New Zealand	An arachnopusiid cheilostome bryozoan, a species of Arachnopusia.	
Arthropoma renipora	Sp. nov	Valid	Di Martino & Taylor	Miocene (late Burdigalian)		Indonesia	A lacernid schizoporelloid bryozoan, a species of Arthropoma.	
Aspidostoma clava	Sp. nov	Valid	Gordon & Taylor	Early Eocene	Tumaio Limestone	New Zealand	An aspidostomatid cheilostome bryozoan, a species of Aspidostoma.	
Aspidostoma gelasinus	Sp. nov	Valid	Gordon & Taylor	Early Eocene	Tumaio Limestone	New Zealand	An aspidostomatid cheilostome bryozoan, a species of Aspidostoma.	
Aspidostoma twinn	Sp. nov	Valid	Gordon & Taylor	Early Eocene	Tumaio Limestone	New Zealand	An aspidostomatid cheilostome bryozoan, a species of Aspidostoma.	
Atactoporella moroccoensis	Sp. nov	Valid	Jiménez-Sánchez, Vennin & Villas	Ordovician (late Katian)		Morocco	A trepostomate bryozoan, a species of Atactoporella.	
Baculopora redondensis	Sp. nov	Valid	Ernst, Wyse Jackson & Aretz	Carboniferous (Viséan)		France	A member of Fenestrata belonging to the family Acanthocladiidae; a species of Baculopora.	
Bryopesanser bragai	Sp. nov	Valid	Di Martino & Taylor	Miocene (late Burdigalian to Serravallian)		Indonesia	An escharinid schizoporelloid bryozoan, a species of Bryopesanser.	
Bryopesanser sanfilippoae	Sp. nov	Valid	Di Martino & Taylor	Miocene (Burdigalian-Langhian boundary to Serravallian)		Indonesia	An escharinid schizoporelloid bryozoan, a species of Bryopesanser.	
Buffonellaria sagittaria	Sp. nov	Valid	Di Martino & Taylor	Miocene (late Burdigalian)		Indonesia	A celleporid celleporoid bryozoan, a species of Buffonellaria.	
Caberoides gordoni	Sp. nov	Valid	Di Martino & Taylor	Miocene (late Burdigalian)		Indonesia	A catenicellid bryozoan, a species of Caberoides.	
Cavernella asturica	Sp. nov	Valid	Suárez Andrés & Ernst	Devonian	Moniello Formation	Spain	A member of the family Fenestellidae.	
Celiopsis	Gen. et sp. et comb. nov	Valid	Zágoršek, Gordon & Vávra	Eocene to Oligocene		Austria; Hungary; Italy; Poland; Slovakia; Spain	A chlidoniopsid cheilostome bryozoan. The type species is Celiopsis vici; genus also contains "Crisidia" vindobonensis Reuss (1847) and "Chlidoniopsis" vavrai Zágoršek (2003).	
Cellaria bicuspidata	Sp. nov	Valid	Gordon & Taylor	Early Eocene	Tumaio Limestone	New Zealand	A cellariid cheilostome bryozoan, a species of Cellaria.	
Cellaria gigas	Sp. nov	Valid	Gordon & Taylor	Early Eocene	Tumaio Limestone	New Zealand	A cellariid cheilostome bryozoan, a species of Cellaria.	
Cellaria inarticulata	Sp. nov	Valid	Gordon & Taylor	Early Eocene	Tumaio Limestone	New Zealand	A cellariid cheilostome bryozoan, a species of Cellaria.	
Cellaria palatum	Sp. nov	Valid	Gordon & Taylor	Early Eocene	Tumaio Limestone	New Zealand	A cellariid cheilostome bryozoan, a species of Cellaria.	
Chaperiopsis cookae	Sp. nov	Valid	Gordon & Taylor	Early Eocene	Tumaio Limestone	New Zealand	A chaperiid cheilostome bryozoan, a species of Chaperiopsis.	
Chataimulosia revelator	Sp. nov	Valid	Gordon & Taylor	Early Eocene	Tumaio Limestone	New Zealand	A lepraliellid cheilostome bryozoan, a species of Chataimulosia.	
Cladobryopastor	Gen. et sp. nov	Valid	Gordon & Taylor	Early Eocene	Tumaio Limestone	New Zealand	A bryopastorid cheilostome bryozoan. The type species is Cladobryopastor philipi.	
Conopeum stamenocelloides	Sp. nov	Valid	Gordon & Taylor	Early Eocene	Tumaio Limestone	New Zealand	A cheilostome bryozoan. Originally described as a species of Conopeum; Dick, Sakamoto & Komatsu (2018) transferred this species to the genus Kenocharixa.	
Curvipora	Gen. et sp. nov	Valid	Ernst, Munnecke & Oswald	Silurian (early Wenlock)		Sweden	A cystoporate bryozoan. The type species is Curvipora monostylata.	
Cyphotrypa regularis	Sp. nov	Valid	Jiménez-Sánchez in Jiménez-Sánchez, Villas & Vennin	Ordovician (late Katian)	Khabt-el-Hajar Formation	Morocco	A trepostomate bryozoan, a species of Cyphotrypa.	
Cystodictya gallensis	Sp. nov	Valid	Ernst, Wyse Jackson & Aretz	Carboniferous (Viséan)		France	A cystoporate bryozoan belonging to the family Cystodictyonidae; a species of Cystodictya.	
Dactylostega spiralis	Sp. nov	Valid	Gordon & Taylor	Early Eocene	Tumaio Limestone	New Zealand	A foveolariid cheilostome bryozoan, a species of Dactylostega.	
Diedropora	Gen. et sp. nov	Valid	Gordon & Taylor	Early Eocene	Tumaio Limestone	New Zealand	An adeonoid cheilostome bryozoan. The type species is Diedropora gravabilis.	
Dybowskiella piriforme	Sp. nov	Valid	Ernst, Wyse Jackson & Aretz	Carboniferous (Viséan)		France	A cystoporate bryozoan belonging to the family Fistuliporidae; a species of Dybowskiella.	
Dybowskiella rotunda	Sp. nov	Valid	Ernst, Wyse Jackson & Aretz	Carboniferous (Viséan)		France	A cystoporate bryozoan belonging to the family Fistuliporidae; a species of Dybowskiella.	
Dyscritella ornata	Sp. nov	Valid	Tolokonnikova, Ernst & Poty	Carboniferous (Tournaisian)	Namur-Dinant Basin	Belgium		
Dyscritella perforata	Sp. nov	Valid	Tolokonnikova et al.	Devonian (latest Famennian)	Comblain-au-Pont Formation	Belgium	A dyscritellid trepostome bryozoan, a species of Dyscritella.	
Eridopora suarezi	Sp. nov	Valid	Ernst, Wyse Jackson & Aretz	Carboniferous (Viséan)		France	A cystoporate bryozoan belonging to the family Fistuliporidae; a species of Eridopora.	
Exechonella chathamensis	Sp. nov	Valid	Gordon & Taylor	Early Eocene	Tumaio Limestone	New Zealand	An exechonellid cheilostome bryozoan, a species of Exechonella.	
Exochella abigailae	Sp. nov	Valid	Gordon & Taylor	Early Eocene	Tumaio Limestone	New Zealand	A romancheinid cheilostome bryozoan, a species of Exochella.	
Exochella linearis	Sp. nov	Valid	Gordon & Taylor	Early Eocene	Tumaio Limestone	New Zealand	A romancheinid cheilostome bryozoan, a species of Exochella.	
Exochella reidae	Sp. nov	Valid	Gordon & Taylor	Early Eocene	Tumaio Limestone	New Zealand	A romancheinid cheilostome bryozoan, a species of Exochella.	
Exochella woodae	Sp. nov	Valid	Gordon & Taylor	Early Eocene	Tumaio Limestone	New Zealand	A romancheinid cheilostome bryozoan, a species of Exochella.	
Fabifenestella macrofenestrata	Sp. nov	Valid	Ernst, Wyse Jackson & Aretz	Carboniferous (Viséan)		France	A member of Fenestrata belonging to the family Fenestellidae; a species of Fabifenestella.	
?Filaguria kalimantanensis	Sp. nov	Valid	Di Martino & Taylor	Miocene (Serravallian)		Indonesia	A cribrilinid bryozoan, possibly a species of Filaguria.	
Fistulipora tolokonnikovae	Sp. nov	Valid	Ernst, Wyse Jackson & Aretz	Carboniferous (Viséan)		France	A cystoporate bryozoan belonging to the family Fistuliporidae; a species of Fistulipora.	
Floridina elegans	Sp. nov	Valid	Gordon & Taylor	Early Eocene	Tumaio Limestone	New Zealand	An onychocellid cheilostome bryozoan, a species of Floridina.	
Gephyrotes moissettei	Sp. nov	Valid	Di Martino & Rosso	Miocene (Tortonian)		Italy	A member of Ascophora belonging to the family Cribrilinidae.	
Gigantopora milenae	Sp. nov	Valid	Di Martino & Taylor	Miocene (Serravallian)		Indonesia	A gigantoporid schizoporelloid bryozoan, a species of Gigantopora.	
Gigantopora grandis	Sp. nov	Valid	Gordon & Taylor	Early Eocene	Tumaio Limestone	New Zealand	A gigantoporid cheilostome bryozoan, a species of Gigantopora.	
Gigantopora modesta	Sp. nov	Valid	Gordon & Taylor	Early Eocene	Tumaio Limestone	New Zealand	A gigantoporid cheilostome bryozoan, a species of Gigantopora.	
Gorjunopora	Gen. et sp. et comb. nov	Valid	Ernst, Wyse Jackson & Aretz	Carboniferous (Viséan)		France; Russia	A member of Fenestrata belonging to the family Acanthocladiidae. The type species is Gorjunopora gallica; genus also includes Gorjunopora triangulata (Schulga-Nesterenko, 1955).	
Hemicyclopora dissidens	Sp. nov	Valid	Gordon & Taylor	Early Eocene	Tumaio Limestone	New Zealand	A romancheinid cheilostome bryozoan, a species of Hemicyclopora.	
Hemicyclopora ventricosa	Sp. nov	Valid	Gordon & Taylor	Early Eocene	Tumaio Limestone	New Zealand	A romancheinid cheilostome bryozoan, a species of Hemicyclopora.	
Heminematopora gaetula	Sp. nov	Valid	Ernst, Jiménez-Sánchez & Baidder	Ordovician (Katian)		Morocco	A species of Heminematopora.	
Hemitrypa adversa	Sp. nov	Valid	Suárez Andrés & Ernst	Devonian	Moniello Formation	Spain	A member of the family Fenestellidae.	
Hemitrypa terentei	Sp. nov	Valid	Suárez Andrés & Ernst	Devonian	Moniello Formation	Spain	A member of the family Fenestellidae.	
Heteropora scholzi	Sp. nov	Valid	Gordon & Taylor	Early Eocene	Tumaio Limestone	New Zealand	A cerioporid cyclostome bryozoan, a species of Heteropora.	
Heterotrypa ringerikense	Sp. nov	Valid	Ernst & Nakrem	Silurian (Wenlock)	Steinsfjorden Formation	Norway	A heterotrypid trepostome bryozoan, a species of Heterotrypa.	
?Hippomenella devatasae	Sp. nov	Valid	Di Martino & Taylor	Miocene (late Burdigalian)		Indonesia	A romancheinid lepralielloid bryozoan, possibly a species of Hippomenella.	
?Hippomenella uniserialis	Sp. nov	Valid	Di Martino & Taylor	Miocene (late Burdigalian)		Indonesia	A romancheinid lepralielloid bryozoan, possibly a species of Hippomenella.	
Hippopleurifera barbosae	Sp. nov	Valid	Ramalho et al.	Miocene	Pirabas Formation	Brazil	A cheilostome bryozoan belonging to the superfamily Lepralielloidea and the family Romancheneidae, a species of Hippopleurifera.	
Hippopleurifera confusa	Sp. nov	Valid	Ramalho et al.	Miocene	Pirabas Formation	Brazil	A cheilostome bryozoan belonging to the superfamily Lepralielloidea and the family Romancheneidae, a species of Hippopleurifera.	
Hippopodina indicata	Sp. nov	Valid	Di Martino & Taylor	Miocene (late Burdigalian to Langhian)		Indonesia	A hippopodinid schizoporelloid bryozoan, a species of Hippopodina.	
Hyporosopora nana	Sp. nov	Valid	Wilson, Bosch & Taylor	Middle Jurassic (Callovian)	Matmor Formation	Israel	A plagioeciid cyclostome bryozoan, a species of Hyporosopora.	
Hyporosopora negevensis	Sp. nov	Valid	Wilson, Bosch & Taylor	Middle Jurassic (Callovian)	Matmor Formation	Israel	A plagioeciid cyclostome bryozoan, a species of Hyporosopora.	
Idmonea snehi	Sp. nov	Valid	Wilson, Bosch & Taylor	Middle Jurassic (Callovian)	Matmor Formation	Israel	A multisparsid cyclostome bryozoan, a species of Idmonea.	
Illusiopora	Gen. et 2 sp. nov	Valid	Gordon & Taylor	Early Eocene	Tumaio Limestone	New Zealand	A schizoporelloid cheilostome bryozoan. The type species is Illusiopora bifax; genus also contains Illusiopora recta.	
Isostylus veserensis	Sp. nov	Valid	Ernst, Tolokonnikova & Denayer	Devonian (late Frasnian)		Belgium	A species of Isostylus.	
Lacerna ordinaria	Sp. nov	Valid	Gordon & Taylor	Early Eocene	Tumaio Limestone	New Zealand	A lacernid cheilostome bryozoan, a species of Lacerna.	
Lagenipora sciutoi	Sp. nov	Valid	Di Martino & Taylor	Miocene (late Burdigalian)		Indonesia	A celleporid celleporoid bryozoan, a species of Lagenipora.	
Lenapora gurievensis	Sp. nov	Valid	Mesentseva	Devonian		Russia	A rhabdomesid bryozoan, a species of Lenapora.	
Leptotrypa enodis	Sp. nov	Valid	Ernst, Munnecke & Oswald	Silurian (early Wenlock)		Sweden	A trepostome bryozoan, a species of Leptotrypa.	
Leptotrypa hexagona	Sp. nov	Valid	Tolokonnikova, Ernst & Poty	Carboniferous (Tournaisian)	Namur-Dinant Basin	Belgium		
Leptotrypa perforata	Sp. nov	Valid	Ernst, Munnecke & Oswald	Silurian (early Wenlock)		Sweden	A trepostome bryozoan, a species of Leptotrypa.	
Macrocamera obesa	Sp. nov	Valid	Gordon & Taylor	Early Eocene	Tumaio Limestone	New Zealand	An eminooeciid cheilostome bryozoan, a species of Macrocamera.	
Margaretta amitabhae	Sp. nov	Valid	Di Martino & Taylor	Miocene (Burdigalian-Langhian boundary to Serravallian)		Indonesia	A margarettid schizoporelloid bryozoan, a species of Margaretta.	
Marssonopora connexa	Sp. nov	Valid	Gordon & Taylor	Early Eocene	Tumaio Limestone	New Zealand	A calloporid cheilostome bryozoan, a species of Marssonopora.	
Mediaporina kiaeri	Sp. nov	Valid	Ernst & Nakrem	Silurian (Wenlock)	Steinsfjorden Formation	Norway	An arthrostylid cryptostome bryozoan, a species of Mediaporina.	
Megacanthopora enodata	Sp. nov	Valid	Ernst, Wyse Jackson & Aretz	Carboniferous (Viséan)		France	A member of Cryptostomata belonging to the family Rhomboporidae; a species of Megacanthopora.	
Melychocella bilamellata	Sp. nov	Valid	Gordon & Taylor	Early Eocene	Tumaio Limestone	New Zealand	An aspidostomatid cheilostome bryozoan, a species of Melychocella.	
Melychocella obliqua	Sp. nov	Valid	Gordon & Taylor	Early Eocene	Tumaio Limestone	New Zealand	An aspidostomatid cheilostome bryozoan, a species of Melychocella.	
Mesenteripora jamesi	Sp. nov	Valid	Gordon & Taylor	Early Eocene	Tumaio Limestone	New Zealand	A plagioeciid cyclostome bryozoan, a species of Mesenteripora.	
Microeciella yoavi	Sp. nov	Valid	Wilson, Bosch & Taylor	Middle Jurassic (Callovian)	Matmor Formation	Israel	An oncousoeciid cyclostome bryozoan, a species of Microeciella.	
Micropora chathamica	Sp. nov	Valid	Gordon & Taylor	Early Eocene	Tumaio Limestone	New Zealand	A microporid cheilostome bryozoan, a species of Micropora.	
Monticulipora globulata	Sp. nov	Valid	Jiménez-Sánchez, Vennin & Villas	Ordovician (late Katian)		Morocco	A trepostomate bryozoan, a species of Monticulipora.	
Monticulipora irregularis	Sp. nov	Valid	Jiménez-Sánchez, Vennin & Villas	Ordovician (late Katian)		Morocco	A trepostomate bryozoan, a species of Monticulipora.	
Moyanopora	Gen. et sp. nov	Valid	Gordon & Taylor	Early Eocene	Tumaio Limestone	New Zealand	An arachnopusiid cheilostome bryozoan. The type species is Moyanopora hugoi.	
Multescharellina pisiformis	Sp. nov	Valid	Gordon & Taylor	Early Eocene	Tumaio Limestone	New Zealand	A lepraliellid cheilostome bryozoan, a species of Multescharellina.	
Myriapora sciutoi	Sp. nov	Valid	Rosso & Di Martino	Miocene (Tortonian and Messinian) to Pleistocene (Gelasian)		Italy; Morocco	A member of Neocheilostomina belonging to the family Myriaporidae; a species of Myriapora.	
Nematopora rara	Sp. nov	Valid	Mesentseva	Devonian		Russia	A rhabdomesid bryozoan, a species of Nematopora.	
Nikiforovastylus	Gen. et sp. nov	Valid	Tolokonnikova et al.	Devonian (latest Famennian)	Comblain-au-Pont Formation	Belgium	A nikiforovellid cryptostome bryozoan. The type species is Nikiforovastylus ourthensis.	
Nikiforovella dinantia	Sp. nov	Valid	Tolokonnikova et al.	Devonian (latest Famennian)	Comblain-au-Pont Formation	Belgium	A nikiforovellid cryptostome bryozoan, a species of Nikiforovella.	
Nikiforovella tobolensis	Sp. nov	Valid	Tolokonnikova	Carboniferous (Tournaisian)		Russia		
Ogiva ellinorvoigtae	Sp. nov	Valid	Martha et al.	Cretaceous (middle Santonian)	Gehrden Formation	Germany	An onychocellid cheilostome bryozoan, a species of Ogiva.	
Onychocella exilis	Sp. nov	Valid	Koromyslova & Shcherbinina	Late Cretaceous (Maastrichtian)		Uzbekistan	An onychocellid cheilostome bryozoan, a species of Onychocella.	
Onychocella subtriangulata	Sp. nov	Valid	Gordon & Taylor	Early Eocene	Tumaio Limestone	New Zealand	An onychocellid cheilostome bryozoan, a species of Onychocella.	
Orthopora worsleyi	Sp. nov	Valid	Ernst & Nakrem	Silurian (Wenlock)	Steinsfjorden Formation	Norway	A rhabdomesid cryptostome bryozoan, a species of Orthopora.	
Osthimosia aurora	Sp. nov	Valid	Gordon & Taylor	Early Eocene	Tumaio Limestone	New Zealand	A celleporid cheilostome bryozoan, a species of Osthimosia.	
Osthimosia curiosa	Sp. nov	Valid	Gordon & Taylor	Early Eocene	Tumaio Limestone	New Zealand	A celleporid cheilostome bryozoan, a species of Osthimosia.	
Oviexechonella	Gen. et sp. nov	Valid	Di Martino & Taylor	Miocene (Serravallian)		Indonesia	An exechonellid arachnopusioid bryozoan. The type species is Oviexechonella digeronimoi.	
Paracuneatopora egregia	Sp. nov	Valid	Mesentseva	Devonian		Russia	A rhabdomesid bryozoan, a species of Paracuneatopora.	
Paracuneatopora kuvaschensis	Sp. nov	Valid	Mesentseva	Devonian		Russia	A rhabdomesid bryozoan, a species of Paracuneatopora.	
Paranicklesopora ornaisa	Sp. nov	Valid	Tolokonnikova, Ernst & Poty	Carboniferous (Tournaisian)	Namur-Dinant Basin	Belgium		
Parvohallopora cystata	Sp. nov	Valid	Jiménez-Sánchez in Jiménez-Sánchez, Villas & Vennin	Ordovician (late Katian)	Khabt-el-Hajar Formation	Morocco	A trepostomate bryozoan, a species of Parvohallopora.	
Perkhurovella	Gen. et sp. nov	Valid	Gorjunova	Carboniferous		Russia	A diploporariine acanthocladiid bryozoan. The type species is Perkhurovella clara.	
Phonicosia sinuosa	Sp. nov	Valid	Gordon & Taylor	Early Eocene	Tumaio Limestone	New Zealand	A lacernid cheilostome bryozoan, a species of Phonicosia.	
Plagioecia zatoni	Sp. nov	Valid	Gordon & Taylor	Early Eocene	Tumaio Limestone	New Zealand	A plagioeciid cyclostome bryozoan, a species of Plagioecia.	
Platonea dilatata	Sp. nov	Valid	Gordon & Taylor	Early Eocene	Tumaio Limestone	New Zealand	A tubuliporid cyclostome bryozoan, a species of Platonea.	
Porella tiorioriensis	Sp. nov	Valid	Gordon & Taylor	Early Eocene	Tumaio Limestone	New Zealand	A bryocryptellid cheilostome bryozoan, a species of Porella.	
Porina turrita	Sp. nov	Valid	Gordon & Taylor	Early Eocene	Tumaio Limestone	New Zealand	A porinid cheilostome bryozoan, a species of Porina.	
Primorella variata	Sp. nov	Valid	Tolokonnikova	Carboniferous (Tournaisian)		Russia		
Prophyllodictya simplex	Sp. nov	Valid	Ma et al.	Ordovician (early Tremadocian)	Nantzinkuan Formation	China	A cryptostome bryozoan, a species of Prophyllodictya.	
Pseudobatostomella parva	Sp. nov	Valid	Tolokonnikova et al.	Devonian (latest Famennian)	Comblain-au-Pont Formation	Belgium	A dyscritellid trepostome bryozoan, a species of Pseudobatostomella.	
Pseudothyracella campbelli	Sp. nov	Valid	Gordon & Taylor	Early Eocene	Tumaio Limestone	New Zealand	A bryopastorid cheilostome bryozoan, a species of Pseudothyracella.	
Puellina bontangensis	Sp. nov	Valid	Di Martino & Taylor	Miocene (late Burdigalian)		Indonesia	A cribrilinid bryozoan, a species of Puellina.	
Pyrisinella primazelandiae	Sp. nov	Valid	Gordon & Taylor	Early Eocene	Tumaio Limestone	New Zealand	A pyrisinellid cheilostome bryozoan, a species of Pyrisinella.	
Quasitrilaminopora	Gen. et sp. nov	Valid	Gordon & Taylor	Early Eocene	Tumaio Limestone	New Zealand	An arachnopusiid cheilostome bryozoan. The type species is Quasitrilaminopora curiosa.	
Radiotrypa alnifensis	Sp. nov	Valid	Ernst, Jiménez-Sánchez & Baidder	Ordovician (Katian)		Morocco	A species of Radiotrypa.	
Rectifenestella covae	Sp. nov	Valid	Suárez Andrés & Ernst	Devonian	Moniello Formation	Spain	A member of the family Fenestellidae.	
Reptadeonella curvabilis	Sp. nov	Valid	Di Martino & Taylor	Miocene (late Burdigalian)		Indonesia	An adeonid bryozoan, a species of Reptadeonella.	
Reptadeonella toddi	Sp. nov	Valid	Di Martino & Taylor	Miocene (late Burdigalian or early Langhian to Serravallian)		Indonesia	An adeonid bryozoan, a species of Reptadeonella.	
Reteporella mediocris	Sp. nov	Valid	Gordon & Taylor	Early Eocene	Tumaio Limestone	New Zealand	A phidoloporid cheilostome bryozoan, a species of Reteporella.	
Revalotrypa ramosa	Sp. nov	Valid	Ernst, Jiménez-Sánchez & Baidder	Ordovician (Katian)		Morocco	A species of Revalotrypa.	
Saevitella renemai	Sp. nov	Valid	Di Martino & Taylor	Miocene (late Burdigalian)		Indonesia	A hippopodinid schizoporelloid bryozoan, a species of Saevitella.	
Saffordotaxis spinigerus	Sp. nov	Valid	Tolokonnikova, Ernst & Poty	Carboniferous (Tournaisian)	Namur-Dinant Basin	Belgium		
Salairella	Gen. et 5 sp. nov	Junior homonym	Mesentseva	Devonian		Russia	A rhabdomesid bryozoan. Genus contains five species: S. petaloida, S. variabilis, S. maculata, S. baskuskanensis and S. recta. The generic name is a junior homonym of Salairella Khalfina (1961) and Salairella Severgina (1984). Hernández (2019) coined a replacement name Devonavictoria.	
Schizoretepora tamagawensis	Sp. nov	Valid	Zágoršek, Takashima & Hirose	Miocene	Tanosawa Formation	Japan	A member of Phidoloporidae, a species of Schizoretepora.	
Sendinopora	Gen. et sp. nov	Valid	Di Martino & Taylor	Miocene (Serravallian)		Indonesia	A tessaradomid lepralielloid bryozoan. The type species is Sendinopora prima.	
Siphonicytara litotes	Sp. nov	Valid	Gordon & Taylor	Early Eocene	Tumaio Limestone	New Zealand	A siphonicytarid cheilostome bryozoan, a species of Siphonicytara.	
Siphonicytara primitiva	Sp. nov	Valid	Gordon & Taylor	Early Eocene	Tumaio Limestone	New Zealand	A siphonicytarid cheilostome bryozoan, a species of Siphonicytara.	
Spinofenestella nodosa	Sp. nov	Valid	Tolokonnikova, Ernst & Poty	Carboniferous (Tournaisian)	Namur-Dinant Basin	Belgium		
Stellatotrypa	Gen. et sp. nov	Valid	Ernst, Munnecke & Oswald	Silurian (early Wenlock)		Sweden	A trepostome bryozoan. The type species is Stellatotrypa hirsuta.	
Sulcoretepora regularis	Sp. nov	Valid	Tolokonnikova	Carboniferous (Tournaisian)		Russia		
Terepennipora	Gen. et comb. nov	Valid	Gorjunova	Carboniferous		Russia	A diploporariine acanthocladiid bryozoan. A new genus for "Pinnatopora" longicellata Morozova (1955); genus also contains "Pinnatopora" volgensis Shishova (1959), "Pinnatopora" inconstans Shishova (1959), "Pinnatopora" subpunctata Shishova (1959) and "Pinnatopora" distincta Shishova (1950).	
Trematopora maculata	Sp. nov	Valid	Ernst & Nakrem	Silurian (Wenlock)	Steinsfjorden Formation	Norway	A trematoporid trepostome bryozoan, a species of Trematopora.	
Triznotrypa potii	Sp. nov	Valid	Ernst, Tolokonnikova & Denayer	Devonian (late Frasnian)		Belgium	A species of Triznotrypa.	
Trypostega hasibuani	Sp. nov	Valid	Di Martino & Taylor	Miocene (late Burdigalian)		Indonesia	A trypostegid hippothooid bryozoan, a species of Trypostega.	
Tubiporella magnipora	Sp. nov	Valid	Di Martino & Taylor	Miocene (late Burdigalian)		Indonesia	A didymosellid didymoselloid bryozoan, a species of Tubiporella.	
Tumaiella	Gen. et sp. nov	Valid	Gordon & Taylor	Early Eocene	Tumaio Limestone	New Zealand	A calloporid cheilostome bryozoan. The type species is Tumaiella dieffenbachi.	
Volgia deftera	Sp. nov	Valid	Ernst, Wyse Jackson & Aretz	Carboniferous (Viséan)		France	A cystoporate bryozoan belonging to the family Hexagonellidae; a species of Volgia.	
Zagorsekia	Gen. et comb. nov	Valid	Gordon & Taylor	Early Eocene	Tumaio Limestone	Australia; New Zealand	A tubuliporid cyclostome bryozoan; a new genus for "Heteropora" nodulosa MacGillivray (1895).	

== See also ==
- Dawn of Humanity (2015 PBS film)
