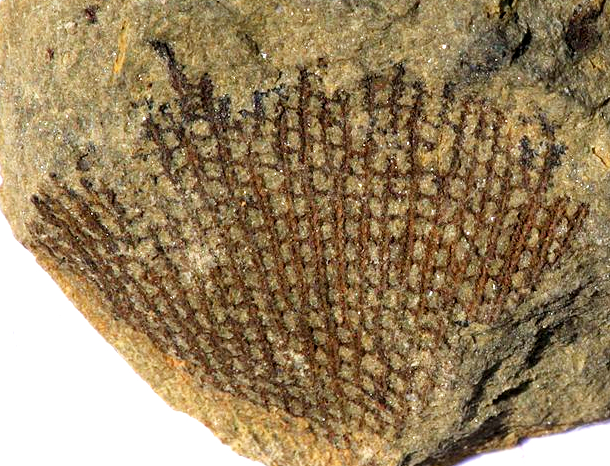
- Fenestella, 14 mm wide, Couvin

Scientific classification
- Kingdom: Animalia
- Phylum: Bryozoa
- Class: Stenolaemata
- Order: †Fenestrida
- Family: †Fenestellidae
- Genus: †Fenestella; Lonsdale, 1839; M'Coy, 1844 non Fenestella Röding, 1798

Type species
- Fenestella antiqua d'Orbigny, 1852

Synonyms
- Fenestrella

= Fenestella (bryozoan) =

Fenestella Temporal range: Middle Ordovician–Carnian

Extinct genus of bryozoans

Fenestella is a genus of bryozoans or moss animals, forming fan–shaped colonies with a netted appearance. It is known from the Middle Ordovician to the early Upper Triassic (Carnian), reaching its largest diversity during the Carboniferous. Many hundreds of species have been described from marine sediments all over the world.

== Etymology ==
Fenestella is Latin for 'little window', and comes from Latin fenestra 'window', named for the window-like openings in the mesh of the skeleton of its colonies.

== Description ==
The skeleton of Fenestella colonies consists of stiff branches that are interconnected by narrower crossbars (or dissepiments). Between two and eight individuals of the colony inhabit each of the opposing front sides of the approximately rectangular openings between the branches (or fenestrules) in one row, and the void they left when they died can be recognized as two rows of small rimmed pores (or apertures) on the front of each branch. In well-preserved specimens, these are closed by centrally perforated lids. In Fenestella, the front of the branches may carry small nodes in a row in the middle. Branches split (or bifurcate) from time to time giving the colonies a fan-shaped appearance. The internal structure of the branches is of decisive importance in the assignment of specimens to genera and species, which greatly hampers identification of intact fossils. Compared to other fenestellids with two rows of apertures, Fenestella is relatively fine, with large apertures and wide dissepiments. The distance between apertures in Fenestella remains the same as colonies grow and individuals (or zooids) will have had equal size lophophores.

== Taxonomy ==
In 1935, the name Fenestella M'Coy, 1844 was replaced by Fenestrellina, because it is a junior homonym of a bivalve, now considered synonymous with Anomia. In 1962, however, Fenestella was reinstated for the bryozoan genus. The misspelling, Fenestrella, became officially rejected. The name in the early third millennium in general was given as Fenestella Lonsdale, 1839.

=== Reassigned species ===
Because Fenestella was erected early on in paleontology, many species have since been reassigned to other Fenestellid genera.

- F. ampla = Protoretepora ampla
- F. cinctuta = Anastomopora cinctuta
- F. conica = Ptiloporina conica
- F. conjunctiva = Isotrypa conjunctiva
- F. crassa = Fenestrellina crassa
- F. jabensis = Fenestepora jabensis
- F. lata = Unitrypa lata
- F. laticrescens = Ptiloporella laticrescens
- F. perforata = Loculipora perforata
- F. quincuncialis = Lyoporella quincuncialis
- F. subquadrans = Lyopora subquadrans
- F. wortheni = Archimedes wortheni
