= A. compactus =

A. compactus may refer to:

- Abacetus compactus, a ground beetle
- Andropogon compactus, a synonym of Sorghum bicolor, commonly called sorghum
- Archimedes compactus, a prehistoric bryozoan
