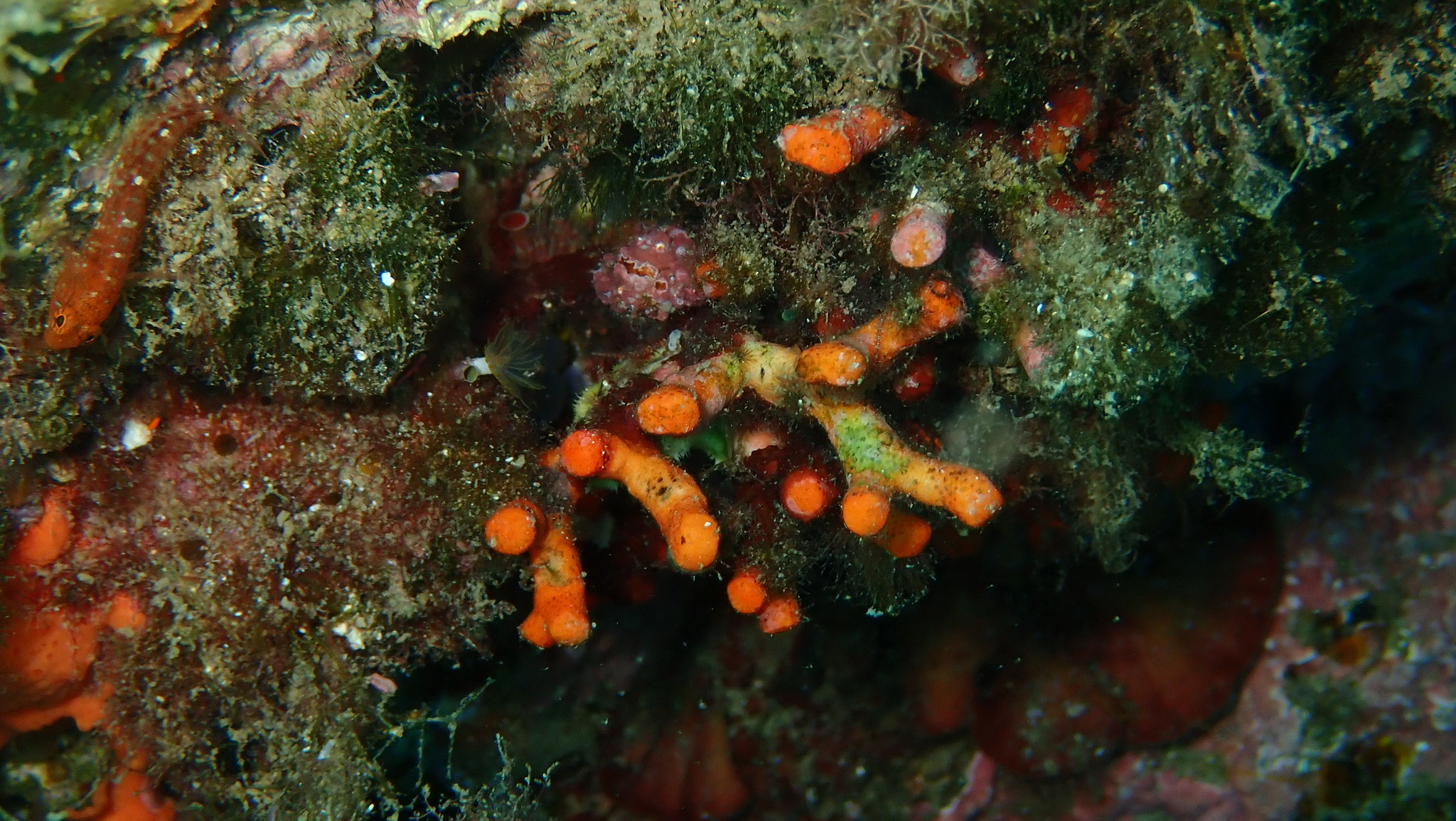

Scientific classification
- Kingdom: Animalia
- Phylum: Bryozoa
- Class: Gymnolaemata
- Order: Cheilostomatida
- Family: Myriaporidae
- Genus: Myriapora
- Species: M. truncata

Binomial name
- Myriapora truncata (Pallas, 1766)

Synonyms
- Millepora truncata Pallas, 1766; Vaginopora polystigma Reuss, 1848

= Myriapora truncata =

Species of bryozoan

Myriapora truncata, also known by its common name false coral is a species from the genus Myriapora. The species was originally described by Peter Simon Pallas in 1766.

== Description ==
Myriapora truncata is a common species on rocky environments from the water surface to a depth of 60 meter, where it forms calcareous colonies. It has a bright red colour which earned it its common name of "False coral".

== Ecology ==
Studies suggest that M. truncata seem well able to withstand the levels of ocean acidification predicted in the next 200 years.

== Natural products ==
Myriapora truncata is the source of 4 polyketide-derived metabolites: Myriaprones 1-4.
