= Hemitrypa =

Scientific classification
- Kingdom: Animalia
- Phylum: Bryozoa
- Class: Stenolaemata
- Order: †Fenestrida
- Family: †Fenestellidae
- Genus: †Hemitrypa; Phillips, 1841

Extinct genus of bryozoans

Hemitrypa is an extinct genus of bryozoans that lived from the Devonian to the Permian period, belonging to the family Fenestellidae. Like some other fenestrate bryozoans, it produced a skeletal superstructure to protect the colony.
