= Celleporaria capensis =

Scientific classification
- Domain: Eukaryota
- Kingdom: Animalia
- Phylum: Bryozoa
- Class: Gymnolaemata
- Order: Cheilostomatida
- Family: Lepraliellidae
- Genus: Celleporaria
- Species: C. capensis

Binomial name
- Celleporaria capensis (O’Donoghue & de Watteville, 1935)

Species of bryozoan

Celleporaria capensis is a species of bryozoan. It is found on the coast of South Africa at depths from 4–100 m (13–328 ft).
