= Lepraliellidae =

Scientific classification
- Kingdom: Animalia
- Phylum: Bryozoa
- Class: Gymnolaemata
- Order: Cheilostomatida
- Family: Lepraliellidae

Family of bryozoans

Lepraliellidae is a family of bryozoans belonging to the order Cheilostomatida.

== Genera ==
Genera:

- Acanthophragma Hayward, 1993
- Balantiostoma (Now in Romancheinidae) Marsson, 1887
- Buchneria (Now in Bryocryptellidae) Harmer, 1957
- Celleporaria Lamouroux, 1821
- Ceratopora
- Cryptostomella
- Dennisia
- Drepanophora
- Frurionella
- Kladapheles
- Kleidionella
- Leiosellina
- Lepraliella Levinsen, 1917
- Multescharellina d'Orbigny, 1852
- Ochetosella (Now in Romancheinidae) Canu & Bassler, 1917
- Pachythecella (Now in Tessaradomidae) Bassler, 1934
- Pseudobeisselina Wiesemann, 1963
- Reptescharellina (family placement in doubt) d'Orbigny, 1852
- Schizemiellopsis Voigt, 1987
- Schizocoryne Hayward & Winston, 2011
- Sinuporaria Pouyet, 1973
- Sphaeropora Haswell, 1880
