= Reussia =

Reussia may refer to:

- Reussia (bryozoan), a genus of bryozoans in the family Bryocryptellidae
- Reussia, a genus of plants in the family Rubiaceae, synonym of Paederia
- Reussia, a genus of protists (foraminifers) in the family Reussellidae, synonym of Reussella
