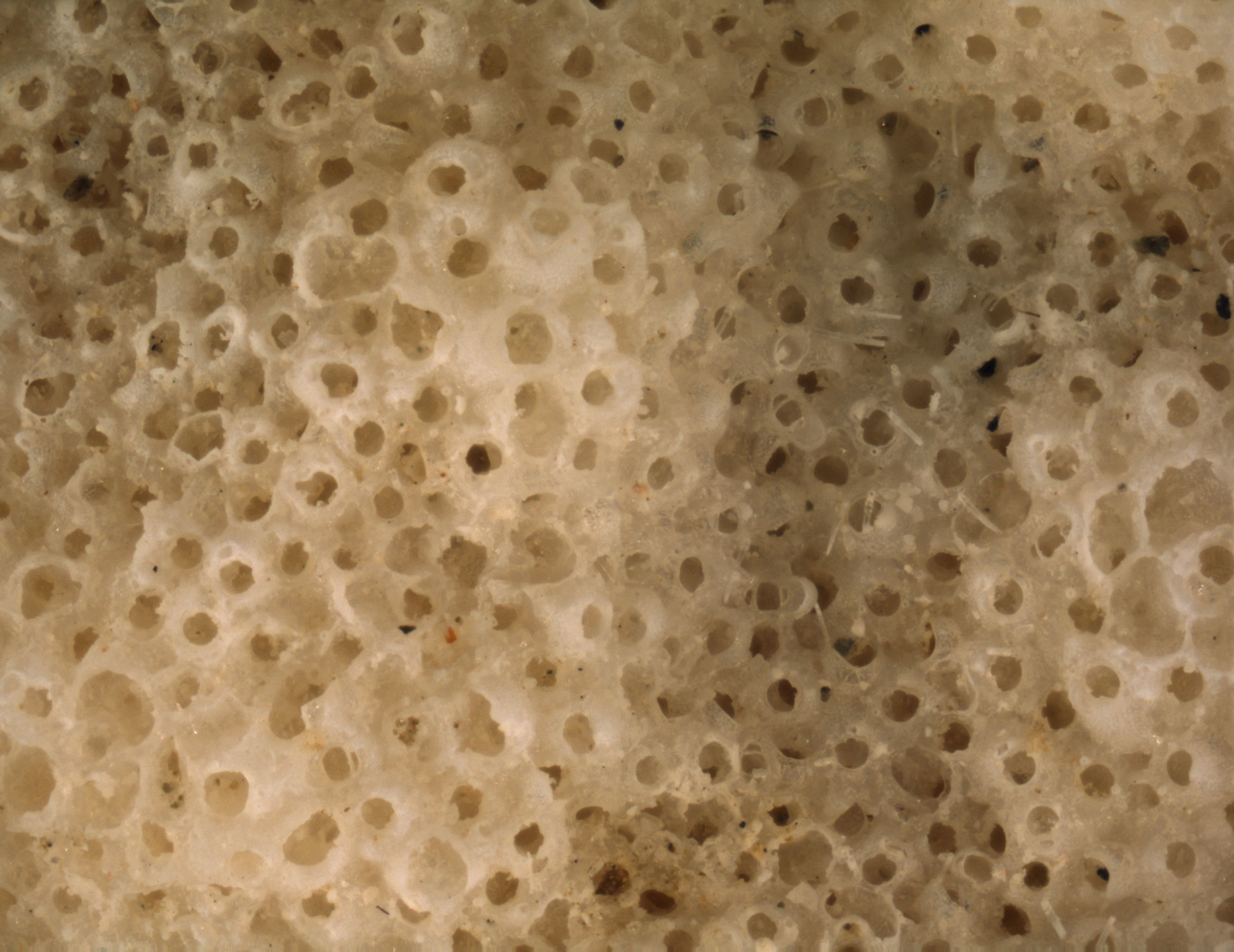

Scientific classification
- Kingdom: Animalia
- Phylum: Bryozoa
- Class: Gymnolaemata
- Order: Cheilostomatida
- Family: Lepraliellidae
- Genus: Celleporaria; Lamouroux, 1821

= Celleporaria =

Genus of bryozoans

Celleporaria is a genus of bryozoans belonging to the family Lepraliellidae.

The genus has cosmopolitan distribution.

Species:

- Celleporaria advena (Smitt, 1873)
- Celleporaria agglutinans (Hutton, 1873)
- Celleporaria albirostris (Smitt, 1873)
- Celleporaria altirostris (Canu & Bassler, 1920)
- Celleporaria ampliata (Hutton, 1873)
- Celleporaria aperta (Hincks, 1882)
- Celleporaria apiculata (Busk, 1881)
- Celleporaria atlantica (Busk, 1884)
- Celleporaria australis Hara, 2001
- Celleporaria bicirrhata (Ortmann, 1890)
- Celleporaria bicornis (Canu & Bassler, 1923)
- Celleporaria bipora (Vigneaux, 1949)
- Celleporaria bispinata (Busk, 1854)
- Celleporaria brunnea (Hincks, 1884)
- Celleporaria calva Tilbrook, 2006
- Celleporaria capensis (O'Donoghue & de Watteville, 1935)
- Celleporaria carvalhoi Marcus, 1939
- Celleporaria celleporina (Angelis d'Ossat & Neviani, 1896)
- Celleporaria columnaris (Busk, 1881)
- Celleporaria compressa (Canu & Bassler, 1928)
- Celleporaria contabulata Reuss, 1865
- Celleporaria convexa (Canu & Bassler, 1929)
- Celleporaria cornigera (Reuss, 1874)
- Celleporaria cornuta (Esper, 1796)
- Celleporaria corrugata (Maplestone, 1909)
- Celleporaria crassa Manzoni, 1877
- Celleporaria crassicollis (Canu & Bassler, 1920)
- Celleporaria cristata (Lamarck, 1816)
- Celleporaria cucullata (Maplestone, 1905)
- Celleporaria cylindrocystis Tilbrook, 2006
- Celleporaria decostilsii (Audouin, 1826)
- Celleporaria desioi (Cipolla, 1928)
- Celleporaria desperabilis Ryland & Hayward, 1992
- Celleporaria discoidea (Busk, 1881)
- Celleporaria discus (Canu & Bassler, 1920)
- Celleporaria distoma Reuss, 1865
- Celleporaria echinata (Canu & Bassler, 1923)
- Celleporaria elatior (Duvergier, 1923)
- Celleporaria emancipata Gordon, 1989
- Celleporaria endivia (Lamarck, 1816)
- Celleporaria erectorostris (Canu & Bassler, 1929)
- Celleporaria erugo Tilbrook, 2006
- Celleporaria fabiani (Cipolla, 1928)
- Celleporaria firmispinosa (Silén, 1954)
- Celleporaria fissurata (Canu & Bassler, 1920)
- Celleporaria fistulosa (Canu, 1904)
- Celleporaria foliacea (Michelin, 1847)
- Celleporaria foliata (MacGillivray, 1888)
- Celleporaria foraminosa (Reuss, 1848)
- Celleporaria fusca (Busk, 1854)
- Celleporaria gambierensis (Tenison Woods, 1880)
- Celleporaria globularis (Bronn, 1837)
- Celleporaria gondwanae Hara, 2001
- Celleporaria gracilis (d'Orbigny, 1852)
- Celleporaria granulosa (Canu & Bassler, 1920)
- Celleporaria granulosa (Haswell, 1881)
- Celleporaria hancocki (Osburn, 1952)
- Celleporaria hastigera (Busk, 1881)
- Celleporaria hemispherica (Canu & Bassler, 1923)
- Celleporaria hesperopacifica Hayward & Ryland, 1995
- Celleporaria honolulensis (Busk, 1881)
- Celleporaria imbellis (Busk, 1881)
- Celleporaria imberbis Tilbrook, 2006
- Celleporaria inaudita Tilbrook, Hayward & Gordon, 2001
- Celleporaria indiscreta Harmer, 1957
- Celleporaria inflata (Canu & Bassler, 1929)
- Celleporaria intermedia (MacGillivray, 1869)
- Celleporaria jacksoniensis (Busk, 1881)
- Celleporaria kataokai Hayami, 1975
- Celleporaria labelligera Harmer, 1957
- Celleporaria lagaaiji Pouyet, 1991
- Celleporaria macrodon Gordon, 1993
- Celleporaria magnifica (Osburn, 1914)
- Celleporaria magnirostris (MacGillivray, 1888)
- Celleporaria mamillata (Busk, 1854)
- Celleporaria massalis (Ulrich & Bassler, 1904)
- Celleporaria mauritiana Hayward, 1988
- Celleporaria melanodermorpha Liu, 2001
- Celleporaria mesetaensis Hara, 2001
- Celleporaria micropora (Canu & Bassler, 1920)
- Celleporaria minuta (Soule, 1961)
- Celleporaria montgomeryensis McGuirt, 1941
- Celleporaria mordax (Marcus, 1937)
- Celleporaria mucronata (Canu & Bassler, 1923)
- Celleporaria multiformatata Liu, 2001
- Celleporaria musensis Pouyet, 1973
- Celleporaria nodulosa (Busk, 1881)
- Celleporaria notulaperta Winston & Jackson, 2021
- Celleporaria nummularia (Tenison-Woods, 1861)
- Celleporaria oculata (Lamarck, 1816)
- Celleporaria oliva (Lamarck, 1816)
- Celleporaria orbifera (Canu & Bassler, 1923)
- Celleporaria ovata Hara, 2001
- Celleporaria palmata (Michelin, 1847)
- Celleporaria papillosa Tenison Woods, 1880
- Celleporaria paratridenticulata Liu, 2001
- Celleporaria peristomaria (Canu & Bassler, 1920)
- Celleporaria peristomata (Osburn, 1952)
- Celleporaria pigmentaria (Waters, 1909)
- Celleporaria pilaefera (Canu & Bassler, 1929)
- Celleporaria pirabasensis Muricy, Domingos, Távora, Ramalho, Pisera & Taylor, 2016
- Celleporaria pisiformis (Canu & Bassler, 1920)
- Celleporaria polymorpha (Busk, 1881)
- Celleporaria polyphyma (Reuss, 1847)
- Celleporaria polythele (Reuss, 1847)
- Celleporaria projecta (Okada & Mawatari, 1937)
- Celleporaria prolifera (MacGillivray, 1888)
- Celleporaria protea Hayward, 1988
- Celleporaria pugioniforme Tilbrook, 2006
- Celleporaria pygmaea (Canu & Bassler, 1929)
- Celleporaria redriverensis McGuirt, 1941
- Celleporaria repens (Canu & Bassler, 1929)
- Celleporaria reussi Pouyet, 1973
- Celleporaria rosefieldensis McGuirt, 1941
- Celleporaria rostrifera (Canu & Bassler, 1923)
- Celleporaria schubarti Marcus, 1939
- Celleporaria separata (Canu & Bassler, 1920)
- Celleporaria serratirostris (MacGillivray, 1885)
- Celleporaria sherryae Winston, 2005
- Celleporaria sibogae Winston & Heimberg, 1986
- Celleporaria sicaria Hayward & Ryland, 1995
- Celleporaria simplex (MacGillivray, 1888)
- Celleporaria speciosa (MacGillivray, 1886)
- Celleporaria spicata (MacGillivray, 1888)
- Celleporaria subalba (Canu & Bassler, 1928)
- Celleporaria subdecostilsii (Sakakura, 1935)
- Celleporaria subflava (Canu & Bassler, 1929)
- Celleporaria transversa (Ortmann, 1890)
- Celleporaria triacantha (Ortmann, 1890)
- Celleporaria triangula Seo, 1994
- Celleporaria triangulavicularis Muricy, Domingos, Távora, Ramalho, Pisera & Taylor, 2016
- Celleporaria tridenticulata (Busk, 1881)
- Celleporaria trifurcata Scholz, 1993
- Celleporaria trispiculata d'Hondt, 1988
- Celleporaria trispinosa (Maplestone, 1909)
- Celleporaria trituberculata (Ortmann, 1890)
- Celleporaria tuberculata (Busk, 1881)
- Celleporaria tubulosa (Canu, 1916)
- Celleporaria umbonata (Canu & Bassler, 1923)
- Celleporaria umbonata (Maplestone, 1909)
- Celleporaria umbonatoidea (Liu & Li, 1987)
- Celleporaria vagans (Busk, 1881)
- Celleporaria valligera Harmer, 1957
- Celleporaria vermiformis (Waters, 1909)
- Celleporaria verrucosa (MacGillivray, 1888)
- Celleporaria volsella Tilbrook, 2006
- Celleporaria wakayamensis (Okada & Mawatari, 1938)
