= Poricella =

Scientific classification
- Kingdom: Animalia
- Phylum: Bryozoa
- Class: Gymnolaemata
- Order: Cheilostomatida
- Family: Arachnopusiidae
- Genus: Poricella; Canu, 1904

Genus of bryozoans

Poricella is a genus of bryozoans belonging to the family Arachnopusiidae.

The genus has almost cosmopolitan distribution.

Species:

- Poricella areolata (Reuss, 1874)
- Poricella bifurcata Ramalho & Moraes, 2021
- Poricella brancoensis (Calvet, 1906)
- Poricella bugei
- Poricella caribbensis Winston & Jackson, 2021
- Poricella catenularia (Moissette, 1983)
- Poricella cayensis Winston & Jackson, 2021
- Poricella celleporoides (Busk, 1884)
- Poricella cookae (Pouyet & Moissette, 1986)
- Poricella davidi Balavoine, 1960
- Poricella fourtaui (Canu, 1904)
- Poricella frigorosa Winston, Vieira & Woollacott, 2014
- Poricella garbovensis Zágoršek, Filipescu & Holcová, 2010
- Poricella horrida (Canu & Bassler, 1923)
- Poricella lanceolata (Canu & Bassler, 1928)
- Poricella lidgardi (Taylor & Foster, 1994)
- Poricella maconnica Canu, 1904
- Poricella malleolus Winston & Jackson, 2021
- Poricella mucronata (Smitt, 1873)
- Poricella musaica (Cook, 1977)
- Poricella oranensis (Waters, 1918)
- Poricella perplexa (Cook, 1967)
- Poricella pouyetae (Cook, 1977)
- Poricella robusta (Hincks, 1884)
- Poricella spathulata (Canu & Bassler, 1929)
- Poricella subspatulata (Osburn, 1950)
- Poricella tripora (Canu, 1911)
