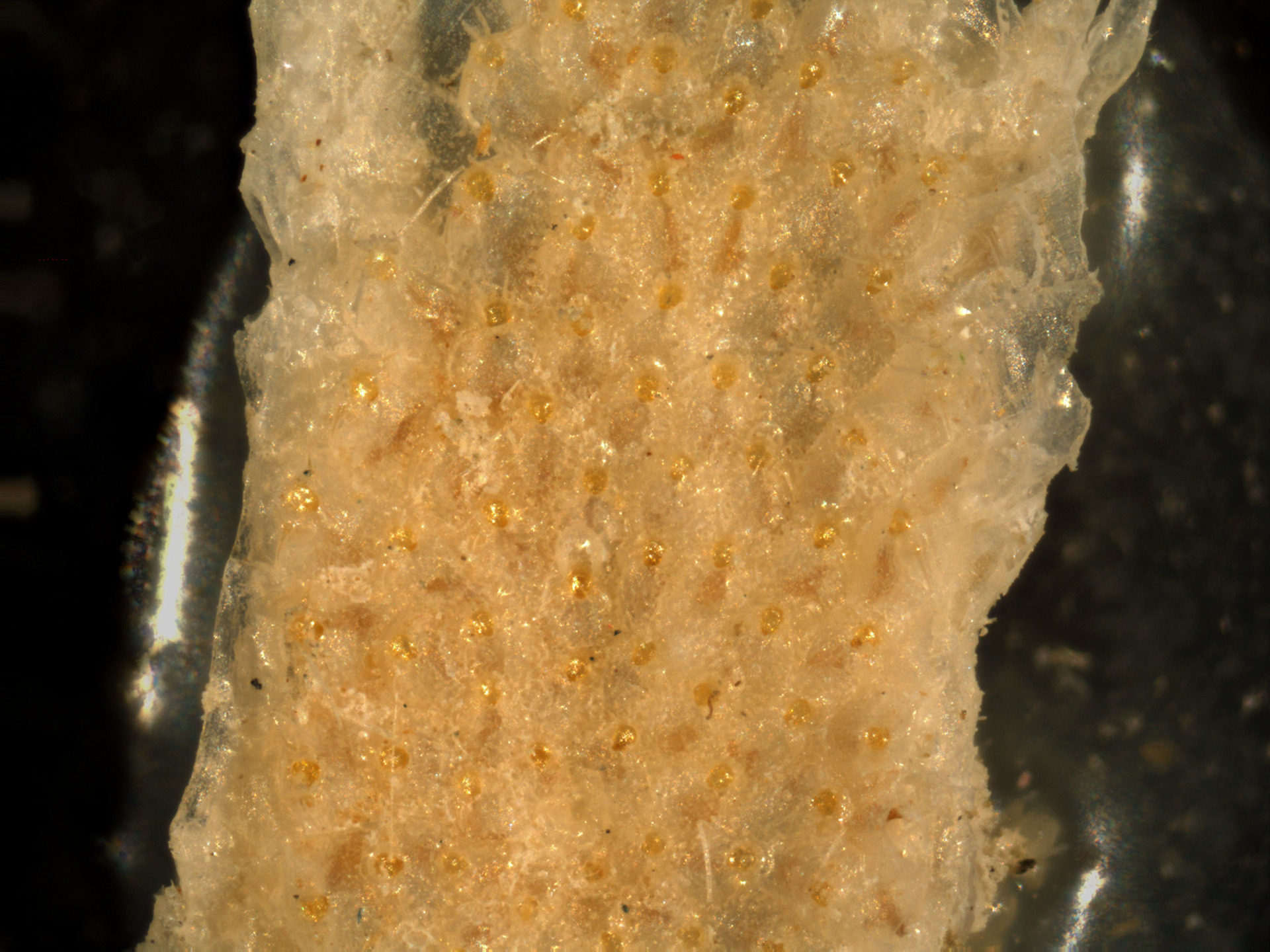
- Hippomenella sp.

Scientific classification
- Kingdom: Animalia
- Phylum: Bryozoa
- Class: Gymnolaemata
- Order: Cheilostomatida
- Family: Romancheinidae
- Genus: Hippomenella; Canu & Bassler, 1917

= Hippomenella =

Genus of bryozoans

Hippomenella is a genus of bryozoans belonging to the family Romancheinidae.

The genus has almost cosmopolitan distribution.

Species:

- Hippomenella alifera Canu & Bassler, 1920
- Hippomenella amaralae Vieira, Gordon, Souza & Haddad, 2010
- Hippomenella angustaedes Canu & Bassler, 1920
- Hippomenella avicularis (Livingstone, 1926)
- Hippomenella axiculata Canu & Bassler, 1920
- Hippomenella bituberosa Brown, 1952
- Hippomenella bragai Zágoršek, 1994
- Hippomenella burdigalensis Li, 1990
- Hippomenella chepigae Gontar, 1993
- Hippomenella convexa (Canu, 1914)
- Hippomenella coronula (Ortmann, 1890)
- Hippomenella devatasae Di Martino & Taylor, 2015
- Hippomenella fiski McGuirt, 1941
- Hippomenella fissurata (Canu & Bassler, 1928)
- Hippomenella flava Osburn, 1952
- Hippomenella gigantica Powell, 1967
- Hippomenella grandirostris Canu & Lecointre, 1930
- Hippomenella infratelum Canu & Bassler, 1919
- Hippomenella konnoi Kataoka, 1961
- Hippomenella ligulata Canu & Bassler, 1920
- Hippomenella magna Canu & Bassler, 1935
- Hippomenella magnifica Furon & Balavoine, 1960
- Hippomenella mitzopoulosi Kühn, 1936
- Hippomenella moodysbranchensis McGuirt, 1941
- Hippomenella mortenseni Marcus, 1938
- Hippomenella mucronata (Canu, 1914)
- Hippomenella mucronelliformis (Waters, 1899)
- Hippomenella parviporosa Canu & Bassler, 1935
- Hippomenella punctata Canu & Bassler, 1920
- Hippomenella pungens Canu & Bassler, 1920
- Hippomenella ramula Hayward & Winston, 2011
- Hippomenella rarirostrata Canu & Bassler, 1935
- Hippomenella rudicula Tilbrook, 2006
- Hippomenella semilaevis (Reuss, 1869)
- Hippomenella transversata Canu & Bassler, 1920
- Hippomenella transversora Canu & Bassler, 1920
- Hippomenella tuberosa Canu & Bassler, 1920
- Hippomenella uniserialis Di Martino & Taylor, 2015
- Hippomenella vellicata (Hutton, 1873)
- Hippomenella vermicularis Canu & Bassler, 1935
