= Lacernidae =

Scientific classification
- Kingdom: Animalia
- Phylum: Bryozoa
- Class: Gymnolaemata
- Order: Cheilostomatida
- Family: Lacernidae

Family of bryozoans

Lacernidae is a family of bryozoans belonging to the order Cheilostomatida.

== Genera ==
Genera:

- Arthropoma Levinsen, 1909
- Cheilonellopsis Gordon, 2014
- Clithriellum Brown, 1948
- Cribellopora Gautier, 1957
- Cylindroporella Hincks, 1877
- Lacerna Jullien, 1888
- Ministiaphila De Blauwe & Gordon, 2014
- Nimba Jullien & Calvet, 1903
- Nimbella Jullien & Calvet, 1903
- Phonicosia Jullien, 1888
- Ralepria Hayward, 1991
- Rogicka Uttley & Bullivant, 1972
- †Schizaropsis Canu & Bassler, 1917
- Schizocoryne Hayward & Winston, 2011
- Vitrius Parker & Gordon, 1992
- Woosukia Min, Seo, Grischenko, Lee & Gordon, 2017
