= Baculopora =

Scientific classification
- Kingdom: Animalia
- Phylum: Bryozoa
- Class: Stenolaemata
- Order: †Fenestrida
- Family: †Acanthocladiidae
- Genus: †Baculopora; Wyse Jackson, 1988

Extinct genus of bryozoan

Baculopora is an extinct genus of bryozoans of the family Acanthocladiidae. Its colonies are irregularly branching, with autozooecia in large oval apertures arranged in four to seven rows on each branch.
