= Phaeostachys =

Scientific classification
- Kingdom: Animalia
- Phylum: Bryozoa
- Class: Gymnolaemata
- Order: Cheilostomatida
- Family: Escharinidae
- Genus: Phaeostachys; Hayward, 1979

Genus of bryozoans

Phaeostachys is a genus of bryozoans belonging to the family Escharinidae.

The species of this genus are found in North Europe.

Species:

- Phaeostachys schmitzi (Norman, 1909)
- Phaeostachys spinifera (Johnston, 1847)
