= Quasitrilaminopora =

Scientific classification
- Kingdom: Animalia
- Phylum: Bryozoa
- Class: Gymnolaemata
- Order: Cheilostomatida
- Family: Arachnopusiidae
- Genus: †Quasitrilaminopora; Gordon & Taylor, 2015

Extinct genus of bryozoans

Quasitrilaminopora is a genus of early Eocene bryozoans of the family Arachnopusiidae, discovered in Chatham Island, New Zealand.
