= Gephyrophora =

Scientific classification
- Kingdom: Animalia
- Phylum: Bryozoa
- Class: Gymnolaemata
- Order: Cheilostomatida
- Family: Gigantoporidae
- Genus: Gephyrophora; Busk, 1884

Genus of bryozoans

Gephyrophora is a genus of bryozoans belonging to the family Gigantoporidae.

The species of this genus are found in the South African Republic, Australia, and New Zealand.

Species:

- Gephyrophora bilamellaria Canu & Bassler, 1935
- Gephyrophora polymorpha Busk, 1884
- Gephyrophora rubra Osburn, 1940
