= Siphonicytaridae =

Scientific classification
- Domain: Eukaryota
- Kingdom: Animalia
- Phylum: Bryozoa
- Class: Gymnolaemata
- Order: Cheilostomatida
- Family: Siphonicytaridae

Family of bryozoans

Siphonicytaridae is a family of bryozoans belonging to the order Cheilostomatida.

Genera:

- Siphonicytara Busk, 1884
