= Aspidostomatidae =

Scientific classification
- Kingdom: Animalia
- Phylum: Bryozoa
- Class: Gymnolaemata
- Order: Cheilostomatida
- Suborder: Flustrina
- Superfamily: Microporoidea
- Family: Aspidostomatidae; Jullien, 1888

Family of bryozoans

Aspidostomatidae is a family of bryozoans belonging to the order Cheilostomatida.

== Genera ==
The following genera are recognised in the family Aspidostomatidae:

- Aspidostoma Hincks, 1881
- Crateropora Levinsen, 1909
- †Entomaria Duvergier, 1921
- Lagarozoum Harmer, 1926
- Larvapora Moyano, 1970
- †Macroporina Balavoine, 1960
- †Matyashegyella Zágoršek, 2001
- †Melychocella Gordon & Taylor, 1999
- †Reptescharinella d'Orbigny, 1852
- †Semiescharinella d'Orbigny, 1852
- †Taphrostoma Canu, 1908
