= Phonicosia =

Scientific classification
- Kingdom: Animalia
- Phylum: Bryozoa
- Class: Gymnolaemata
- Order: Cheilostomatida
- Family: Lacernidae
- Genus: Phonicosia; Jullien, 1888

Genus of bryozoans

Phonicosia preserved specimen

Phonicosia is a genus of bryozoans belonging to the family Lacernidae.

The species of this genus are found in Australia, New Zealand, Malesia, southernmost South America.

Species:

- Phonicosia circinata (MacGillivray, 1869)
- Phonicosia crena Min, Seo, Grischenko, Lee & Gordon, 2017
- Phonicosia jousseaumi Jullien, 1888
- Phonicosia oviseparata (Brown, 1952)
- Phonicosia reingensis (Powell, 1967)
- Phonicosia sinuosa Gordon & Taylor, 2015
- Phonicosia vandiemenensis (Powell, 1967)
