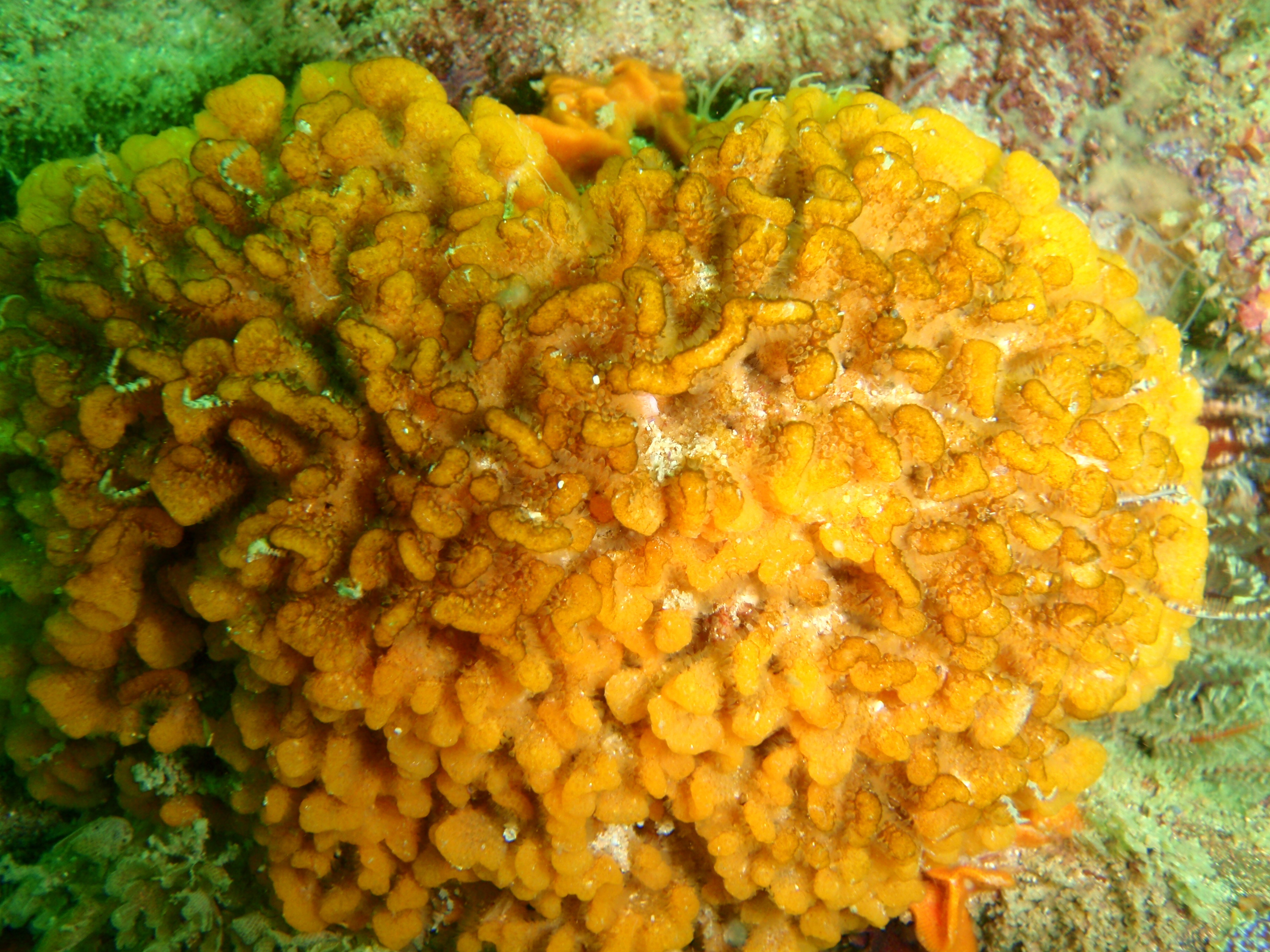
- False corals at Lorry Bay PB012030

Scientific classification
- Kingdom: Animalia
- Phylum: Bryozoa
- Class: Gymnolaemata
- Order: Cheilostomatida
- Family: Gigantoporidae
- Genus: Gigantopora; Ridley, 1881

= Gigantopora =

Genus of bryozoans

Gigantopora is a genus of bryozoans belonging to the family Gigantoporidae.

The species of this genus are found in the central Atlantic Ocean, Pacific Ocean, and coasts of the South African Republic.

== Species ==
Species:

- Gigantopora birostris Tilbrook, 2006
- Gigantopora cribraria (MacGillivray, 1895)
- Gigantopora duplicata (Reuss, 1848)
- Gigantopora elongata Canu & Bassler, 1935
- Gigantopora filiformis Canu & Bassler, 1920
- Gigantopora foraminosa Hayward & Cook, 1983
- Gigantopora grandis Gordon & Taylor, 2015
- Gigantopora grandviewensis McGuirt, 1941
- Gigantopora hexagonalis Canu & Bassler, 1935
- Gigantopora kirkpatricki Hayward, 1988
- Gigantopora lyncoides Ridley, 1881
- Gigantopora lyratostoma (Reuss, 1865)
- Gigantopora milenae Di Martino & Taylor, 2015
- Gigantopora minutiporosa Canu & Bassler, 1935
- Gigantopora modesta Gordon & Taylor, 2015
- Gigantopora oropiscis Gordon & d'Hondt, 1997
- Gigantopora perforata Canu & Bassler, 1935
- Gigantopora profunda Harmer, 1957
- Gigantopora proximalis Gordon, 1984
- Gigantopora pupa (Jullien, 1903)
- Gigantopora spathula Hayward & Winston, 2011
- Gigantopora spiculifera Canu & Bassler, 1927
- Gigantopora tuberculosa (Maplestone, 1902)
- Gigantopora unirostris Canu & Bassler, 1929
- Gigantopora vartonensis Pedramara, Zágoršek, Bitner, Yazdi, Bahrami & Maleki, 2019
- Gigantopora verrucosissima Moyano, 2002
