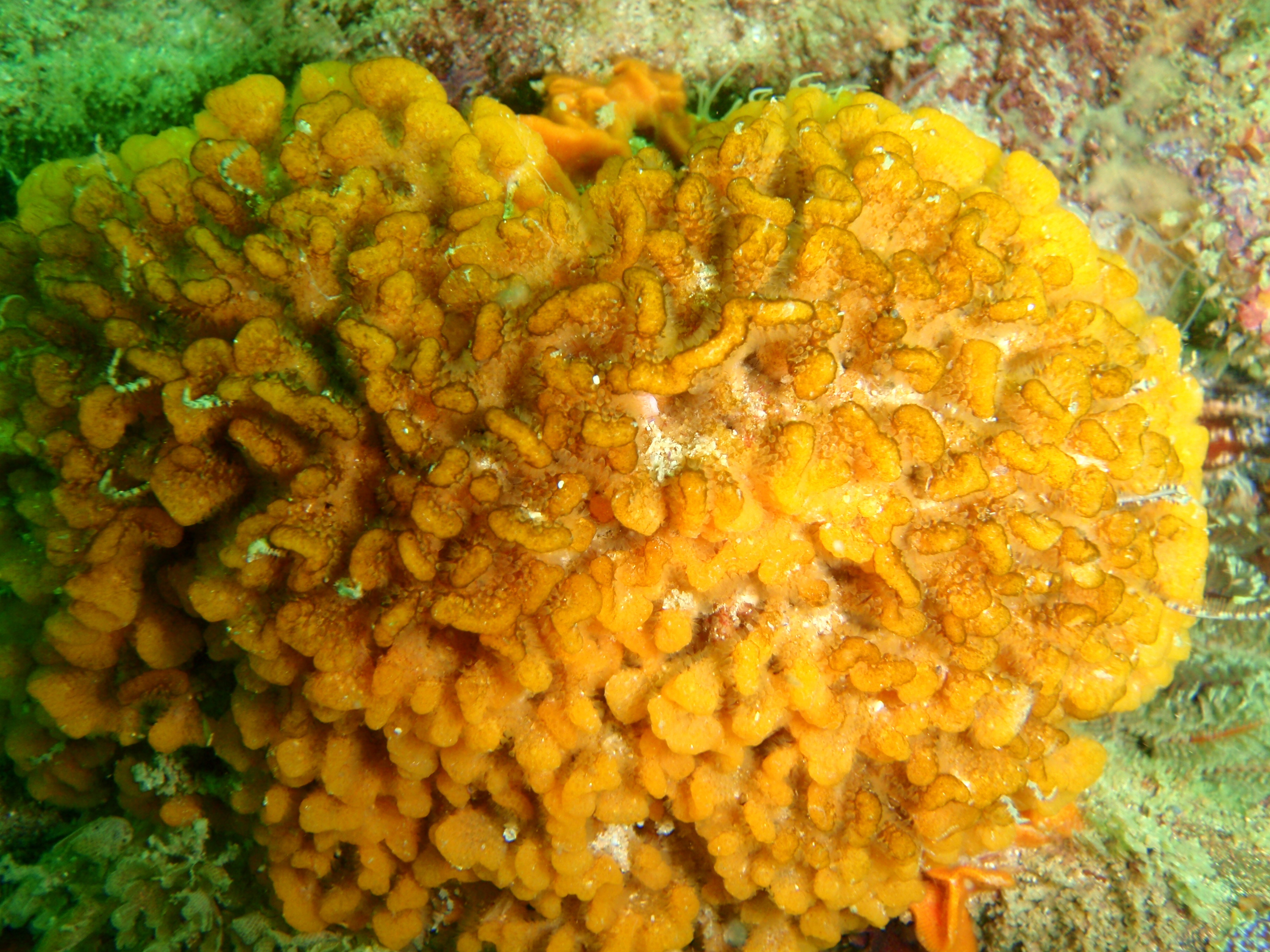
- False corals

Scientific classification
- Kingdom: Animalia
- Phylum: Bryozoa
- Class: Gymnolaemata
- Order: Cheilostomatida
- Family: Gigantoporidae

= Gigantoporidae =

Family of bryozoans

Gigantoporidae is a family of bryozoans belonging to the order Cheilostomatida.

Genera:

- Barbadiopsis Winston & Woollacott, 2009
- Cosciniopsis Canu & Bassler, 1927
- Gephyrophora Busk, 1884
- Gigantopora Ridley, 1881
- Hemicosciniopsis Vigneaux, 1949
- Stenopsella Bassler, 1952
