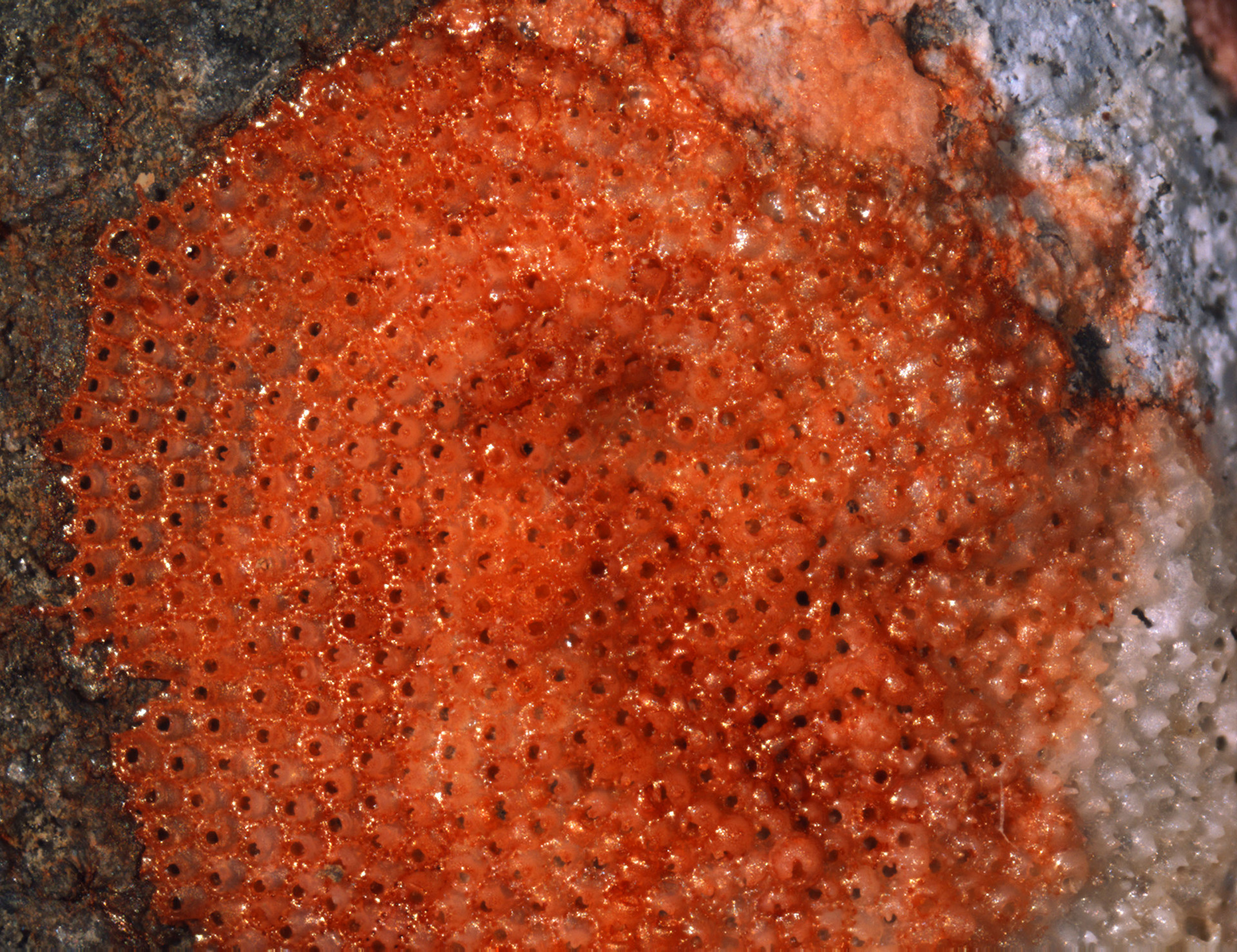

Scientific classification
- Domain: Eukaryota
- Kingdom: Animalia
- Phylum: Bryozoa
- Class: Gymnolaemata
- Order: Cheilostomatida
- Family: Hippopodinidae

= Hippopodinidae =

Family of bryozoans

Hippopodinidae is a family of bryozoans belonging to the order Cheilostomatida.

Genera:

- Archoporella Guha & Gopikrishna, 2005
- Hippopodina Levinsen, 1909
- Saevitella Bobies, 1956
- Thornelya Harmer, 1957
- Trilochites Hayward, 1991
