= Fenestrata =

Fenestrata Temporal range: Ordovician–Permian

Scientific classification
- Kingdom: Animalia
- Phylum: Bryozoa
- Class: Stenolaemata
- Order: †Fenestrata

Extinct order of moss animals

Fenestrata is an extinct order of bryozoan, dating from the Upper Arenig. Most fenestrate bryozoans formed net-like colonies, often in funnel- or fan-shaped forms, with a single layer of zooids facing one direction. The colony shape served as a filter-feeding apparatus that water currents flowed through, with autozooecial apertures only on the side of the colony facing into the current. This colony structure was vulnerable to predators, so some fenestrate bryozoans produced skeletal superstructures, likely to strengthen or protect the colony, and others had protective spines surrounding their autozooecial apertures.

Some sources consider Fenestrata to be a synonym of Fenestrida, while others treat them as separate orders.
