= Porina (bryozoan) =

Scientific classification
- Kingdom: Animalia
- Phylum: Bryozoa
- Class: Gymnolaemata
- Order: Cheilostomatida
- Family: Porinidae
- Genus: Porina d'Orbigny, 1852

Genus of bryozoans

Porina is a genus of bryozoans belonging to the family Porinidae.

The species of this genus are found in Europe, Northern America, Malesia, Australia.

== Species ==
Species:

- Porina abduazimovae Favorskaya, 1992
- Porina acutimargo Brydone, 1930
- Porina africana d'Orbigny, 1852
- Porina australiensis Haswell, 1881
- Porina gracilis Lamarck, 1816
- Porina longicollis Canu & Bassler, 1929
- Porina rugosa d'Orbigny, 1852
