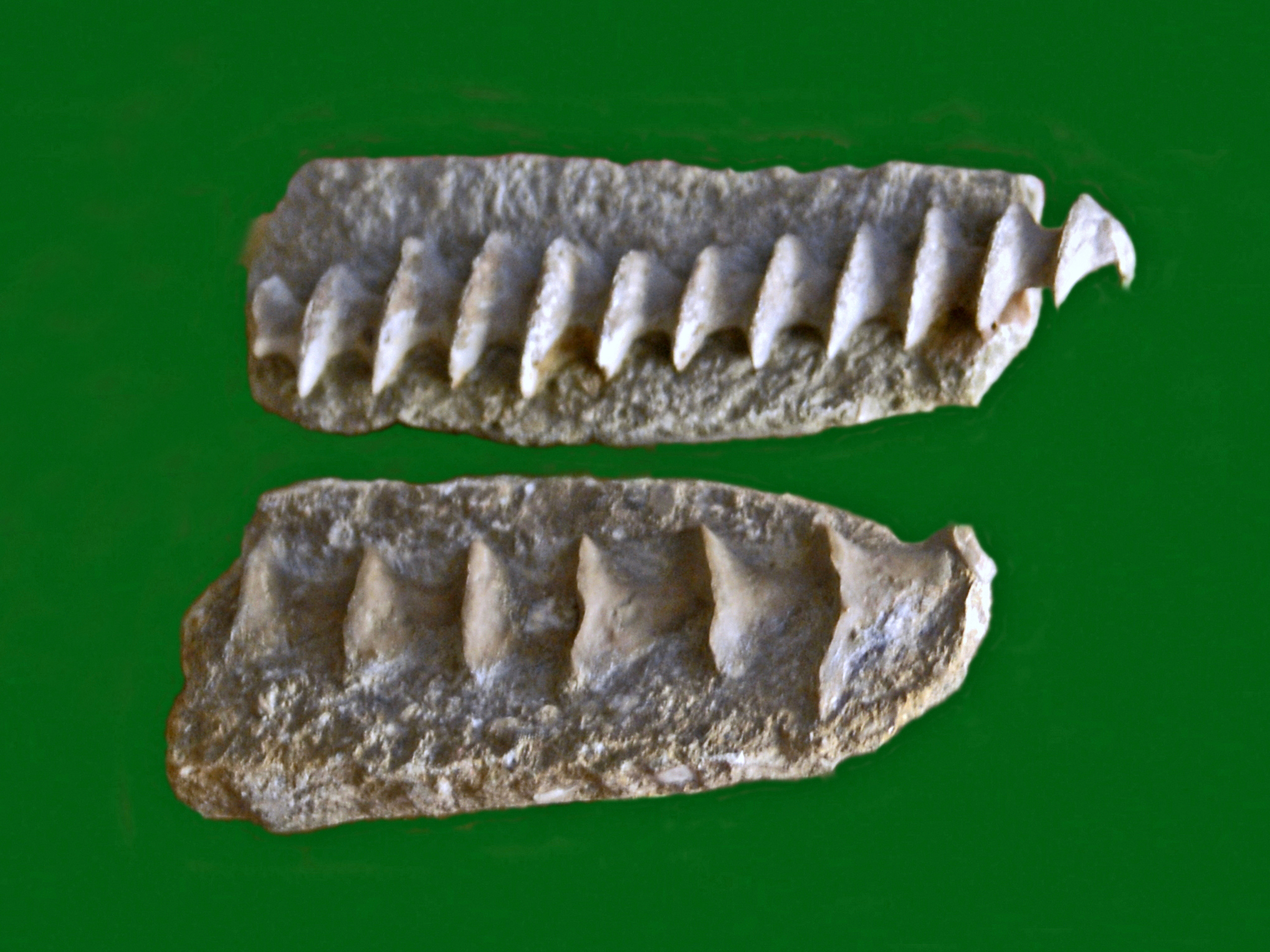
- Fossil stalks of Archimedes from Illinois, on display at Galerie de paléontologie et d'anatomie comparée in Paris

Scientific classification
- Kingdom: Animalia
- Phylum: Bryozoa
- Class: Stenolaemata
- Order: †Fenestrida
- Family: †Fenestellidae
- Genus: †Archimedes; Owen, 1838

Species
- A. wortheni (Hall, 1856) type = Fenestella wortheni

Synonyms
- Archimedipora d'Orbigny, 1849

= Archimedes (bryozoan) =

Archimedes Temporal range: Carboniferous - Permian

Extinct genus of moss animals

Archimedes is a genus of bryozoans belonging to the family Fenestellidae. The first use of the term "Archimedes" in relation to this genus was in 1838.

== Etymology ==
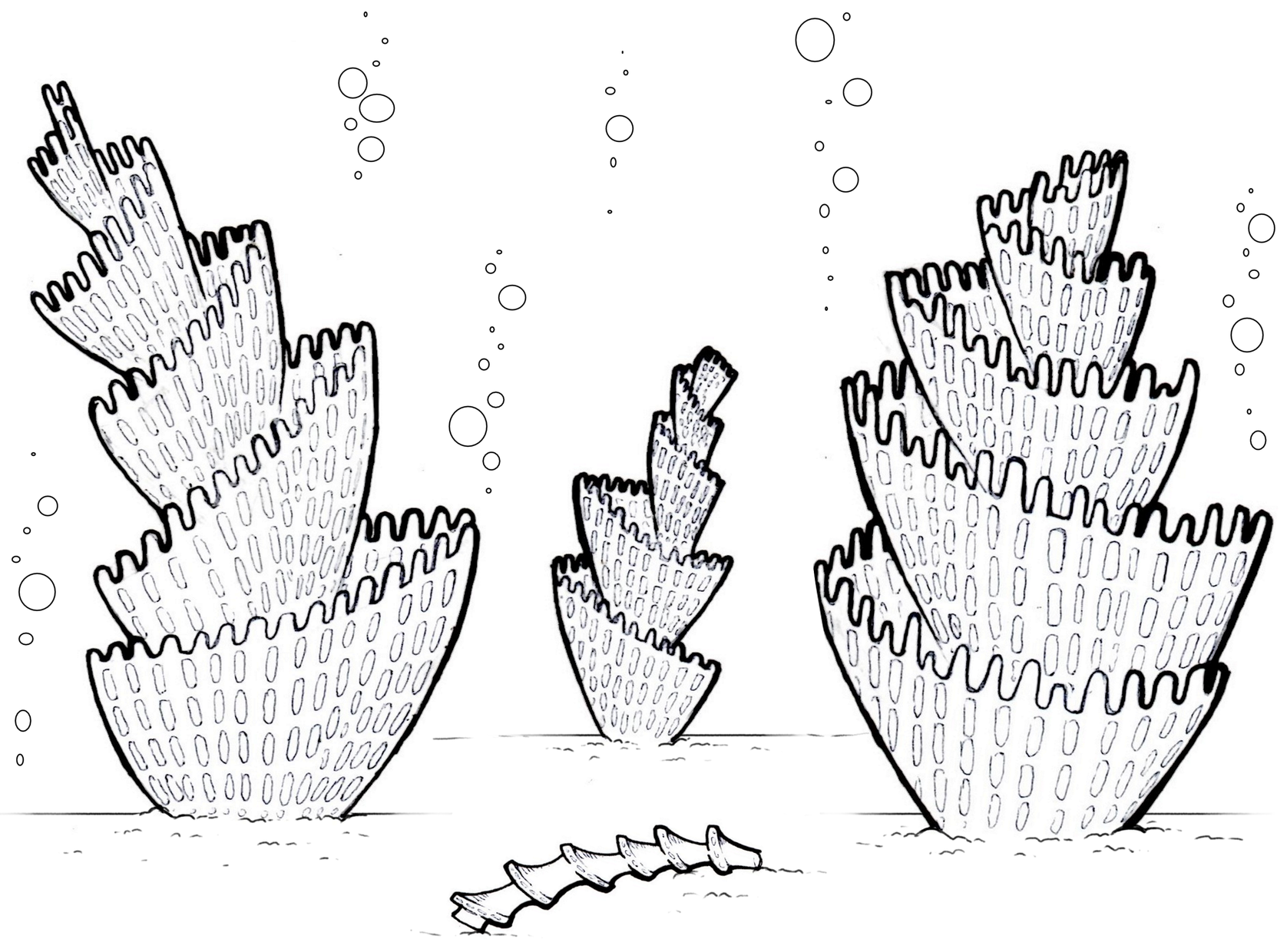
Life restoration

This genus of bryozoans is named Archimedes because of its corkscrew shape, in analogy to the Archimedes' screw, a type of water pump which inspired modern ship propellers in turn named after the ancient greek polymath. These forms are common as fossils but they have been extinct since the Permian.

== Species ==
- Archimedes orientalis Schulga-Nesterenko 1936
- Archimedes regina Crockford 1947
- Archimedes stuckenbergi Nikiforova 1938

== Fossil range ==
These bryozoans lived from the Carboniferous period (Tournaisian age) to the Permian period (Leonard age) (345.3 to 268.0 Ma), when this genus became extinct.

== Description ==
Stereo image
Left frame
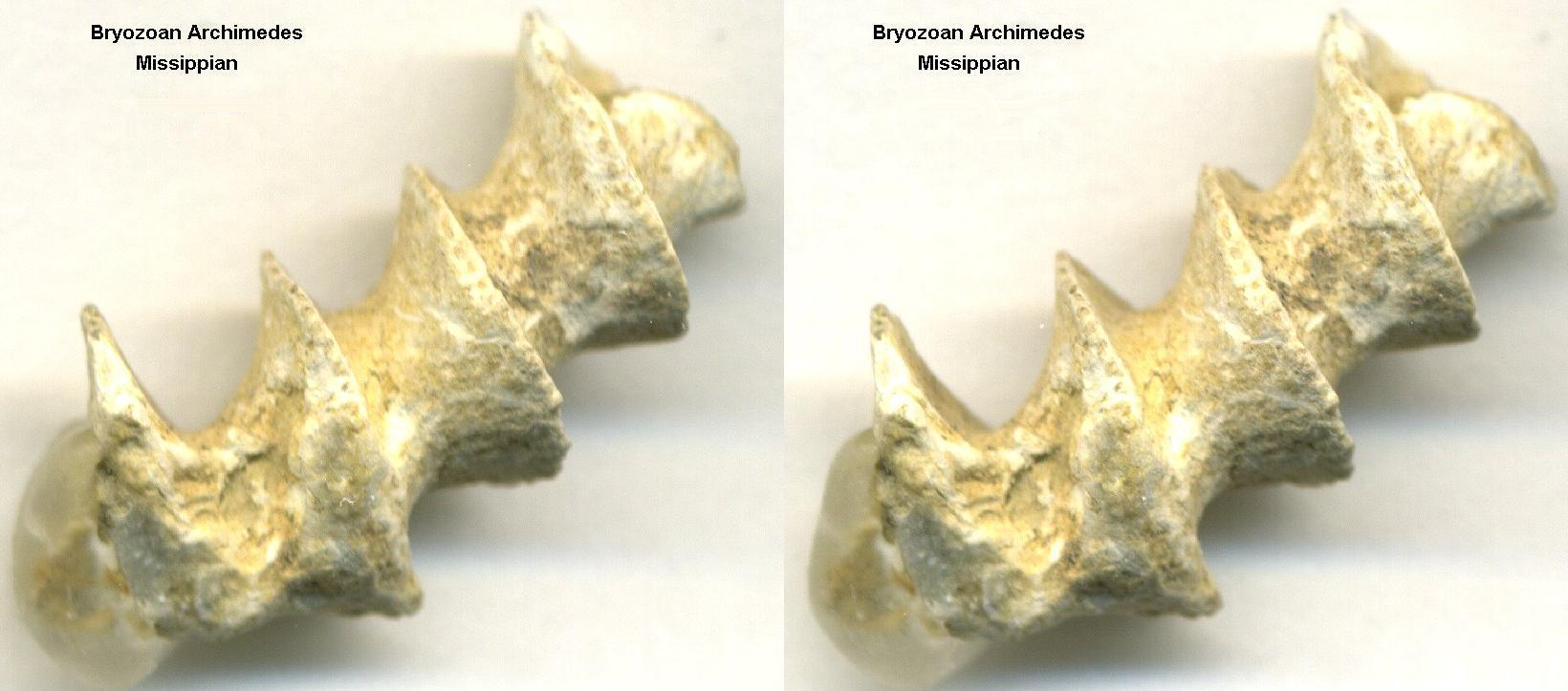
Right frame
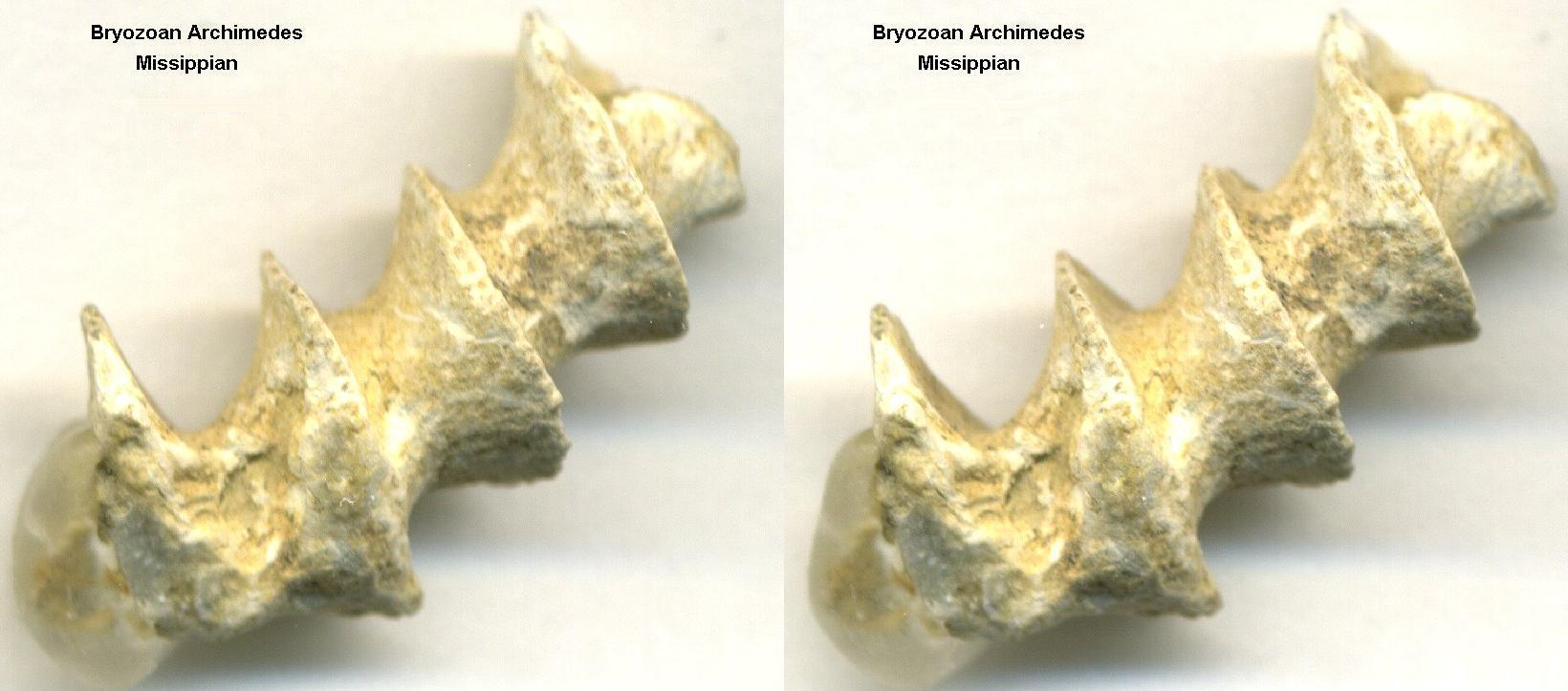
Parallel view
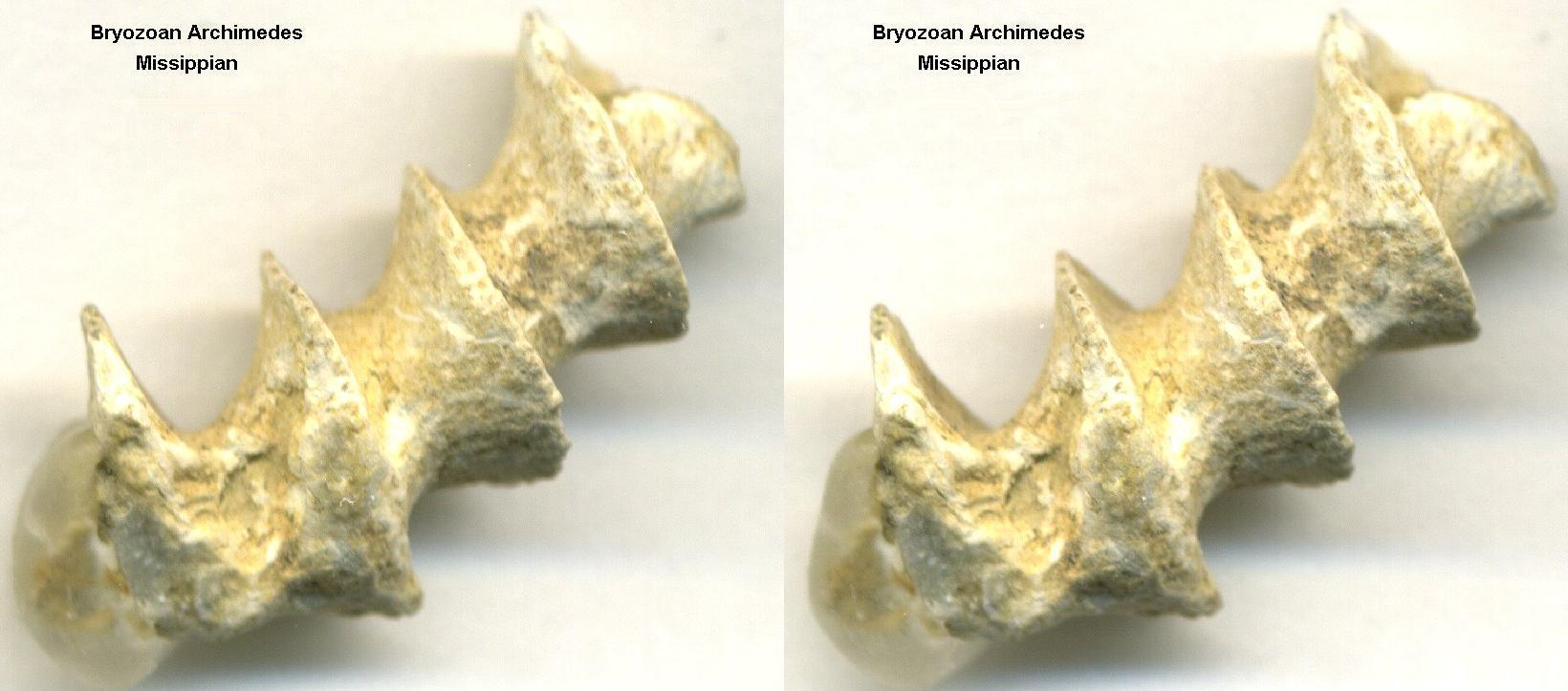
Cross-eye view
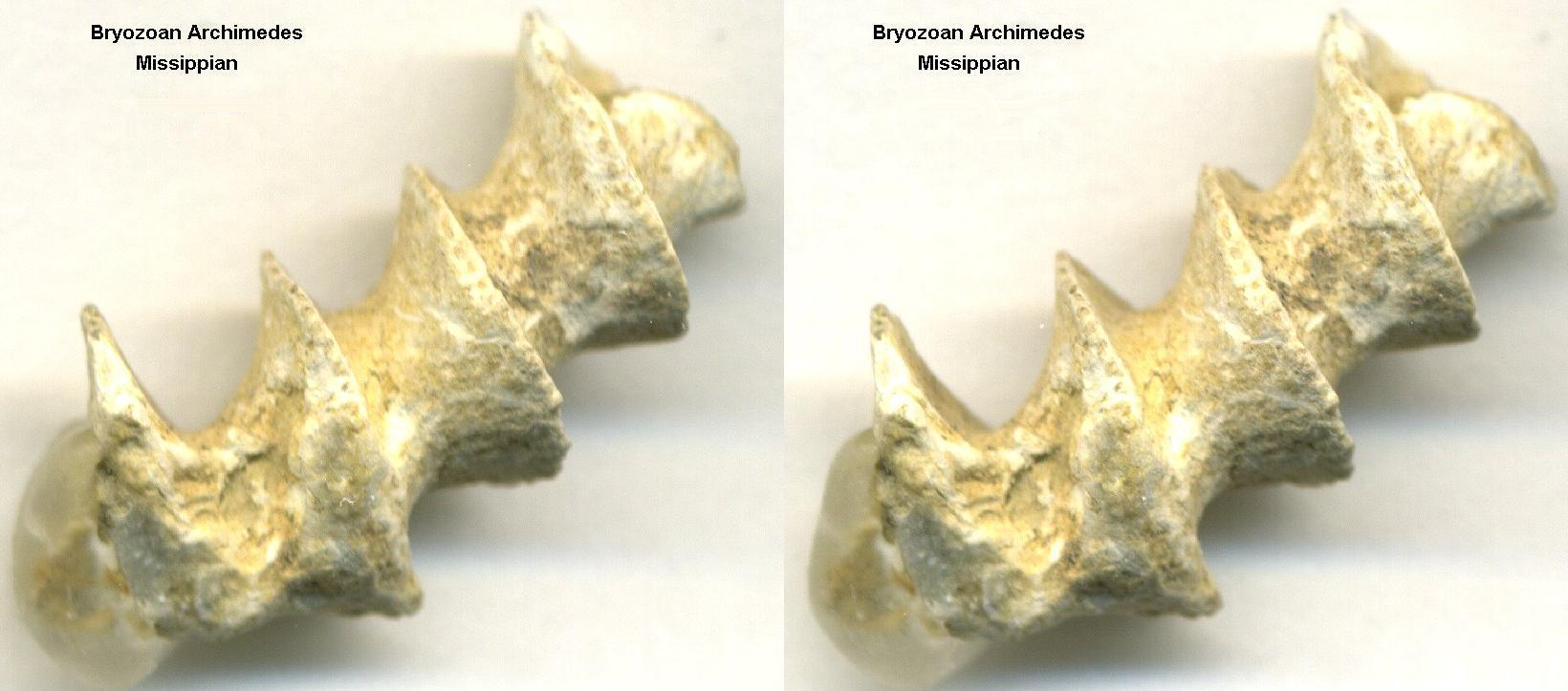

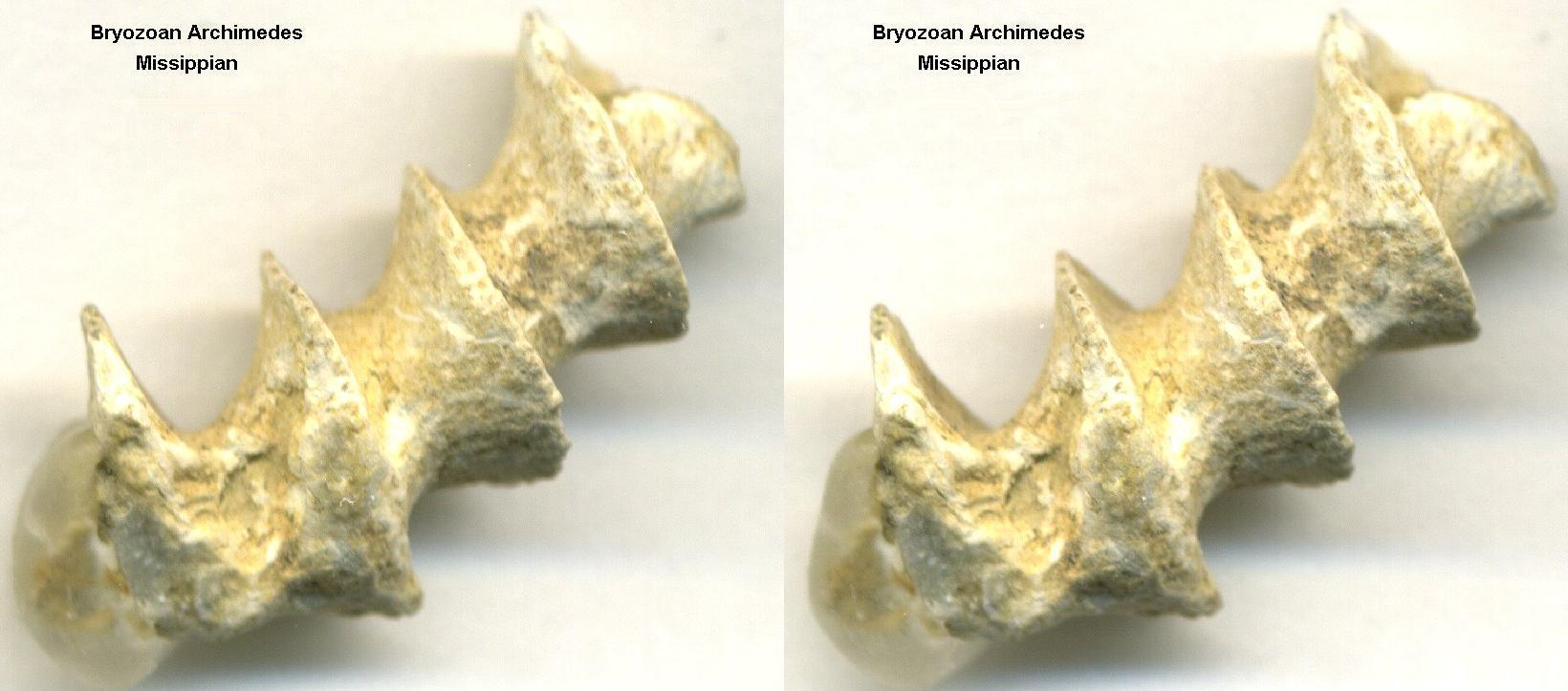
- Fossilized skeleton of Archimedes Bryozoan.

Archimedes is a genus of fenestrate bryozoans with a calcified skeleton of a delicate spiral-shaped mesh that was thickened near the axis into a massive corkscrew-shaped central structure. The most common remains are fragments of the mesh that are detached from the central structure, and these may not be identified other than by association with the "corkscrews", that are fairly common. Specimens in which the mesh remains attached to the central structure are rare. Like other bryozoans, Archimedes forms colonies, and like other fenestrates, the individuals (or zooids) lived on one side of the mesh, and can be recognized for the two rows of equally distanced rimmed pores. Inside the branches, neighbouring individuals were in contact through small canals. Bryozoans are stationary epifaunal suspension feeders.

== Distribution ==
The majority of fossils of this genus are distributed throughout Europe and North America, but they have also been found in sediments of Afghanistan, Canada, Russia, and Australia.
