= Leptotrypa =

Scientific classification
- Kingdom: Animalia
- Phylum: Bryozoa
- Class: Stenolaemata
- Order: †Trepostomida
- Family: †Atactotoechidae
- Genus: †Leptotrypa; Ulrich, 1883

Extinct genus of Bryozoans

Leptotrypa is an extinct genus of bryozoans of the family Atactotoechidae that formed unifoliate encrusting colonies, growing on surfaces like the shells of brachiopods.
