= Escharinidae =

Scientific classification
- Kingdom: Animalia
- Phylum: Bryozoa
- Class: Gymnolaemata
- Order: Cheilostomatida
- Family: Escharinidae

Family of bryozoans

Escharinidae is a family of bryozoans belonging to the order Cheilostomatida.

== Genera ==
Genera:

- Allotherenia Winston & Vieira, 2013
- Bactridium Reuss, 1848
- Bryopesanser Tilbrook, 2006
- Chiastosella Canu & Bassler, 1934
- Dightonia Brown, 1948
- Escharina Milne Edwards, 1836
- Herentia Gray, 1848
- Phaeostachys Hayward, 1979
- Schizobathysella Canu & Bassler, 1917
- Taylorus Pérez, López Gappa, Vieira & Gordon, 2020
- Therenia David & Pouyet, 1978
- Toretocheilum Rogick, 1960
