= Porinidae =

Scientific classification
- Domain: Eukaryota
- Kingdom: Animalia
- Phylum: Bryozoa
- Class: Gymnolaemata
- Order: Cheilostomatida
- Family: Porinidae

Family of bryozoans

Porinidae is a family of bryozoans belonging to the order Cheilostomatida.

Genera:

- Cyphonella Koschinsky, 1885
- Gastropella Canu & Bassler, 1917
- Haswelliporina Gordon & d'Hondt, 1997
- Mosaicoporina Gordon & d'Hondt, 1997
- Porina d'Orbigny, 1852
- Semihaswellia Canu & Bassler, 1917
- Tremotoichos Canu & Bassler, 1917
