= Nimba =

Nimba may refer to:

- Mount Nimba, mountain on the border of Ivory Coast and Guinea
- Nimba Range, mountain range in Guinea
- Nimba County, Liberia
- Nimba, alternative name for the neem tree
