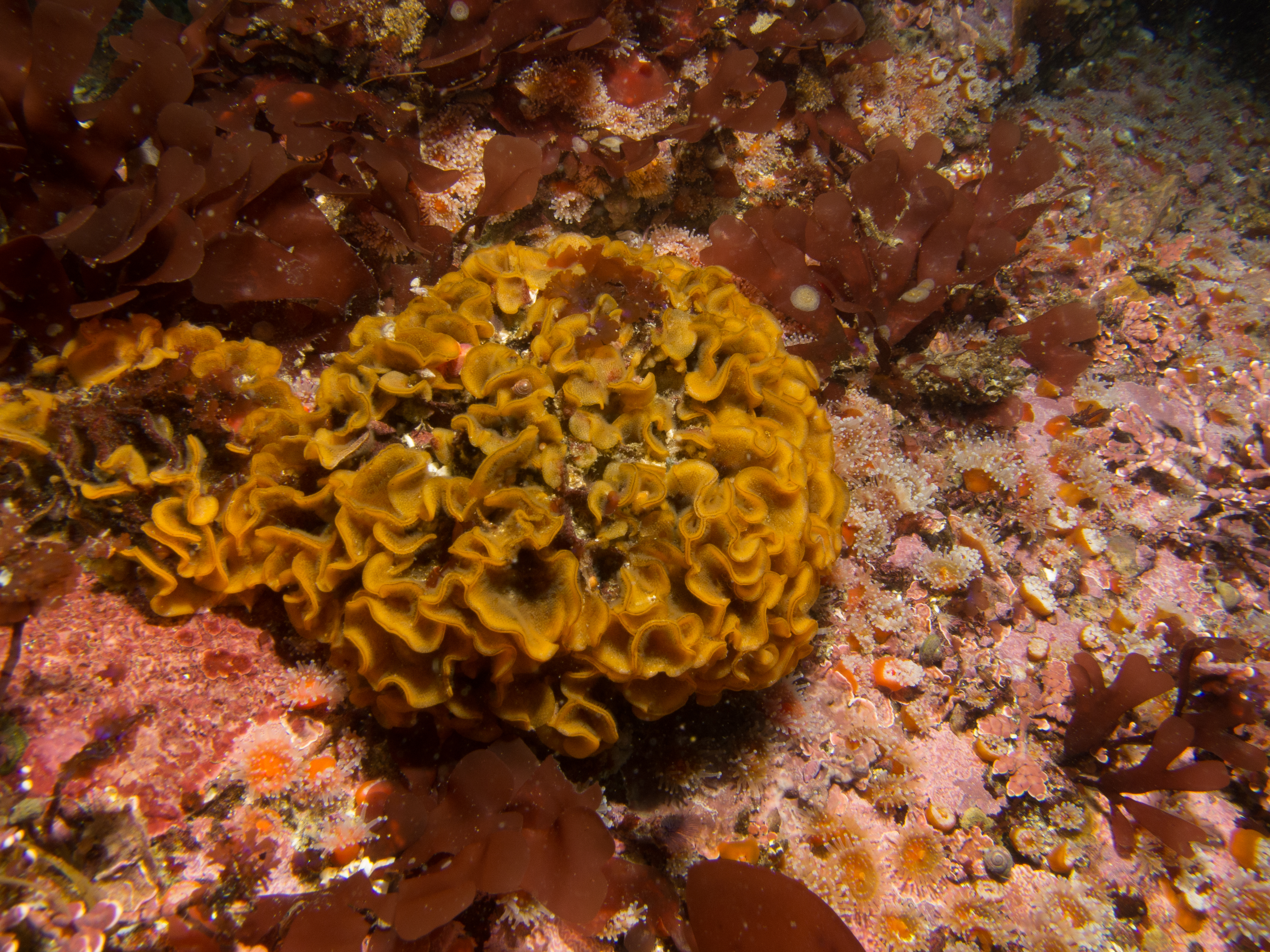
- Fluted Bryozoan

Scientific classification
- Kingdom: Animalia
- Phylum: Bryozoa
- Class: Gymnolaemata
- Order: Cheilostomatida
- Family: Bryocryptellidae
- Genus: Reussia; Neviani, 1895

Synonyms
- Hippodiplosia Canu, 1916

= Reussia (bryozoan) =

Genus of bryozoans

Reussia is a genus of bryozoans belonging to the family Bryocryptellidae.

The species of this genus are found in Europe, North America.

Species:

- Reussia baculina (Canu & Bassler, 1929)
- Reussia granulosa (Canu & Bassler, 1925)
- Reussia lata (Androsova, 1958)
- Reussia minor (Androsova, 1958)
- Reussia patagonica Canu, 1904
- Reussia regularis (Reuss, 1865)
- Reussia strangulata (Canu & Bassler, 1920)
