= Lacerna =

Scientific classification
- Kingdom: Animalia
- Phylum: Bryozoa
- Class: Gymnolaemata
- Order: Cheilostomatida
- Family: Lacernidae
- Genus: Lacerna; Jullien, 1888

Genus of bryozoans

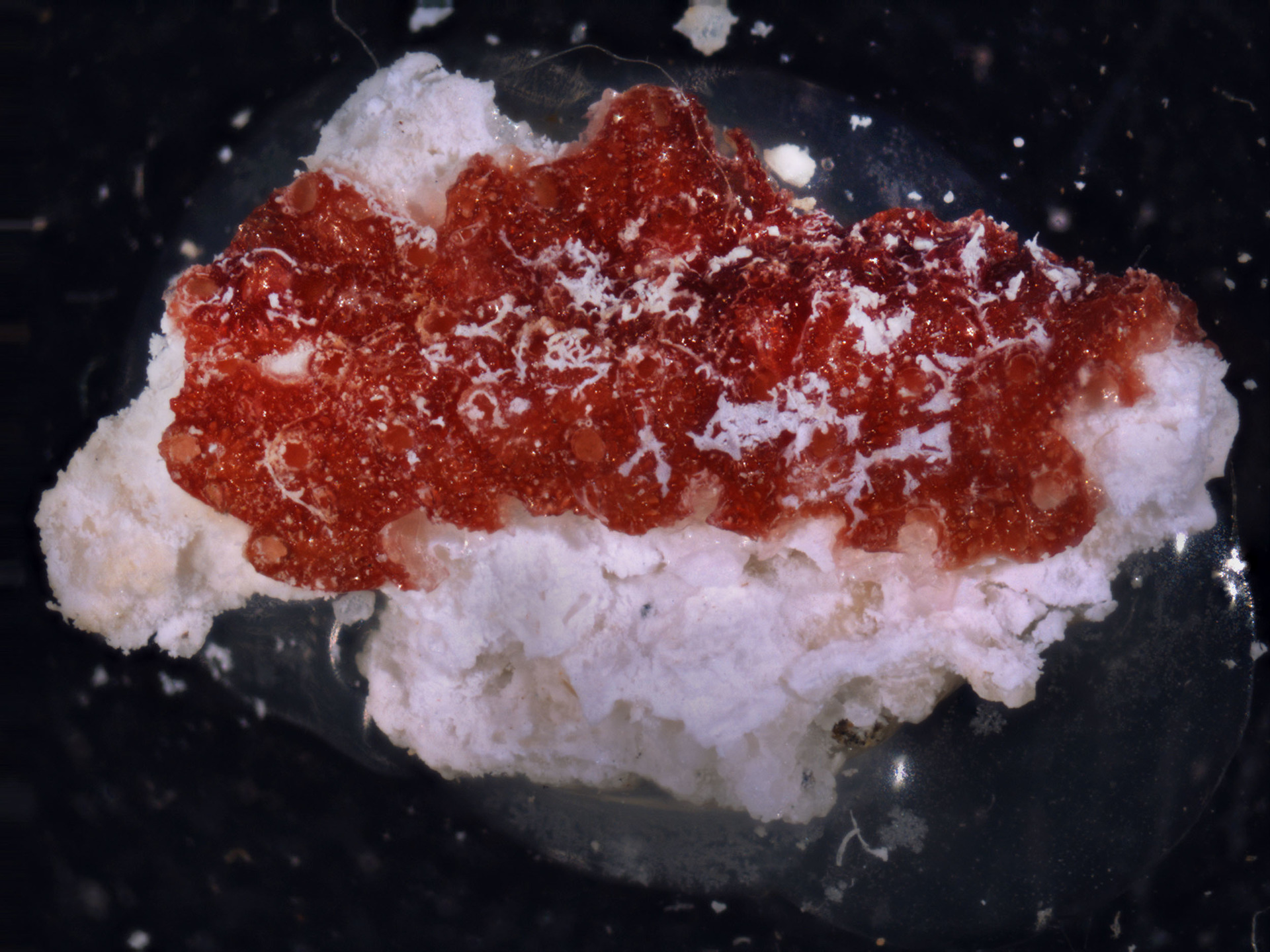
Specimen of Lacerna gabriellae

Lacerna is a genus of bryozoans belonging to the family Lacernidae.

The species of this genus are found in the Americas, southernmost Southern Hemisphere.

Species:

- Lacerna arachnoides (MacGillivray, 1883)
- Lacerna aviculifera Canu & Lecointre, 1928
- Lacerna baculifera (Canu & Bassler, 1929)
- Lacerna cavolini (Neviani, 1895)
- Lacerna convexa (MacGillivray, 1895)
- Lacerna eatoni (Busk, 1876)
- Lacerna fissa (Koschinsky, 1885)
- Lacerna fuchsii (Reuss, 1874)
- Lacerna furcensis Vigneaux, 1949
- Lacerna gabriellae Marcus, 1955
- Lacerna gibbosa Canu & Lecointre, 1928
- Lacerna hexagonalis Canu & Bassler, 1920
- Lacerna hosteensis Jullien, 1888
- Lacerna jacksonensis Canu & Bassler, 1920
- Lacerna nitens (MacGillivray, 1895)
- Lacerna nitidissima (Maplestone, 1902)
- Lacerna ordinaria Gordon & Taylor, 2015
- Lacerna ovalis (Maplestone, 1902)
- Lacerna planata (Manzoni, 1875)
- Lacerna problematica Gordon, 1984
- Lacerna styphelia (Gordon, 1989)
- Lacerna watersi Hayward & Thorpe, 1989
