= Bryopastoridae =

Scientific classification
- Kingdom: Animalia
- Phylum: Bryozoa
- Class: Gymnolaemata
- Order: Cheilostomatida
- Suborder: Flustrina
- Superfamily: Calloporoidea
- Family: Bryopastoridae d'Hondt & Gordon, 1999

Family of bryozoans

Bryopastoridae is a family of bryozoans belonging to the order Cheilostomatida.

== Genera ==
The following genera are recognised in the family Bryopastoridae:

- Bryopastor Gordon, 1982
- †Cladobryopastor Gordon & Taylor, 2015
- †Dioptropora Marsson, 1887
- †Monticellaria Voigt, 1987
- Pseudothyracella Labracherie, 1975
- †Thyracella Voigt, 1930
- †Vincentownia Martha, Sanner, Cheetham & Scholz, 2025
- †Virgocella Voigt, 1957
