= Exechonellidae =

Scientific classification
- Kingdom: Animalia
- Phylum: Bryozoa
- Class: Gymnolaemata
- Order: Cheilostomatida
- Family: Exechonellidae

Family of bryozoans

Exechonellidae is a family of bryozoans belonging to the order Cheilostomatida.

== Genera ==
Genera:

- Anarthropora Smitt, 1868
- Anexechona Osburn, 1950
- Enantiosula
