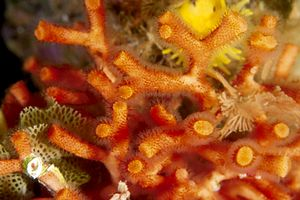
- Myriapora truncata (a species within the genus)

Scientific classification
- Kingdom: Animalia
- Phylum: Bryozoa
- Class: Gymnolaemata
- Order: Cheilostomatida
- Family: Myriaporidae
- Genus: Myriapora de Blainville, 1830

= Myriapora =

Genus of bryozoans

Myriapora is a genus of bryozoans belonging to the family Myriaporidae.

The genus has almost cosmopolitan distribution.

Species:

- Myriapora beyrichi (Stoliczka, 1862)
- Myriapora bugei d'Hondt, 1975
- Myriapora fungiformis Vavra, 1983
- Myriapora kuhni Vávra, 2011
- Myriapora operculata (Canu & Bassler, 1935)
- Myriapora orientalis (Kluge, 1929)
- Myriapora sciutoi Rosso & di Martino, 2015
- Myriapora simplex (Busk, 1884)
- Myriapora truncata (Pallas, 1766)
