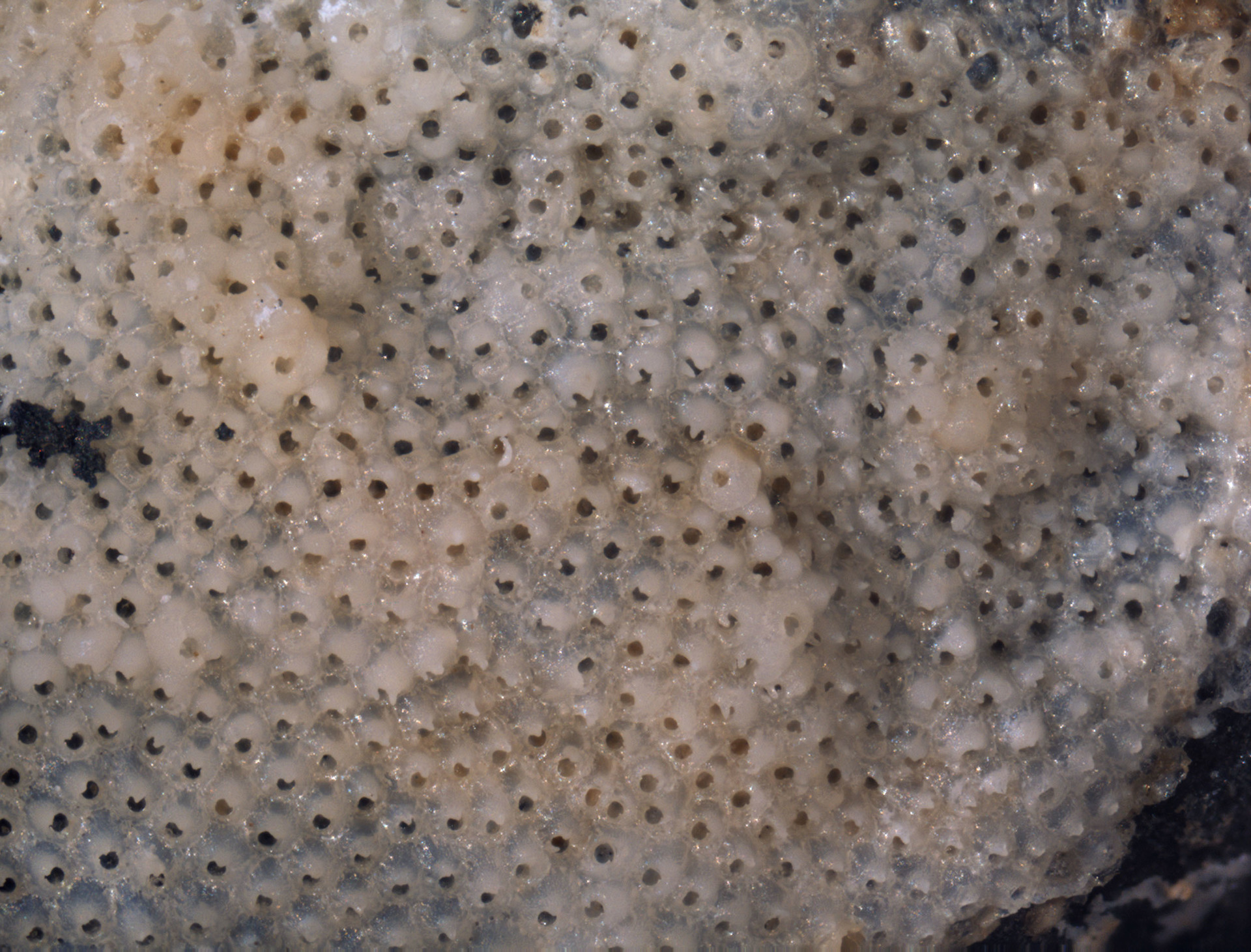
- Hippopodina sp.

Scientific classification
- Kingdom: Animalia
- Phylum: Bryozoa
- Class: Gymnolaemata
- Order: Cheilostomatida
- Family: Hippopodinidae
- Genus: Hippopodina; Levinsen, 1909

= Hippopodina =

Genus of bryozoans

Hippopodina is a genus of bryozoans belonging to the family Hippopodinidae.

The genus has almost cosmopolitan distribution.

Species:

- Hippopodina adunca Tilbrook, 2006
- Hippopodina ambita (Hayward, 1974)
- Hippopodina bernardi Lagaaij, 1963
- Hippopodina bilamellata Gontar, 1993
- Hippopodina californica Osburn, 1952
- Hippopodina emerensis Abbas & El-Senoussi, 1979
- Hippopodina feegeensis (Busk, 1884)
- Hippopodina iberica Pouyet, 1976
- Hippopodina inaequalis Brown, 1952
- Hippopodina indicata Di Martino & Taylor, 2015
- Hippopodina inversa Winston & Jackson, 2021
- Hippopodina iririkiensis Tilbrook, 1999
- Hippopodina irregularis Osburn, 1940
- Hippopodina lappi David, 1965
- Hippopodina pectoralis Harmer, 1957
- Hippopodina pulcherrima (Canu & Bassler, 1928)
- Hippopodina stephensi Cheetham, 1962
- Hippopodina tahitiensis (Leca & d'Hondt, 1993)
- Hippopodina vibraculifera Canu & Bassler, 1917
