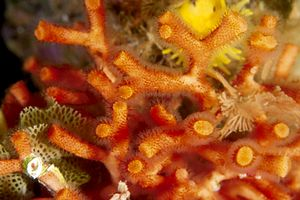
- Myriapora truncata

Scientific classification
- Domain: Eukaryota
- Kingdom: Animalia
- Phylum: Bryozoa
- Class: Gymnolaemata
- Order: Cheilostomatida
- Family: Myriaporidae

= Myriaporidae =

Family of bryozoans

Myriaporidae is a family of bryozoans belonging to the order Cheilostomatida.

Genera:

- Leieschara M.Sars, 1863
- Myriapora de Blainville, 1830
- Myriozoella Levinsen, 1909
