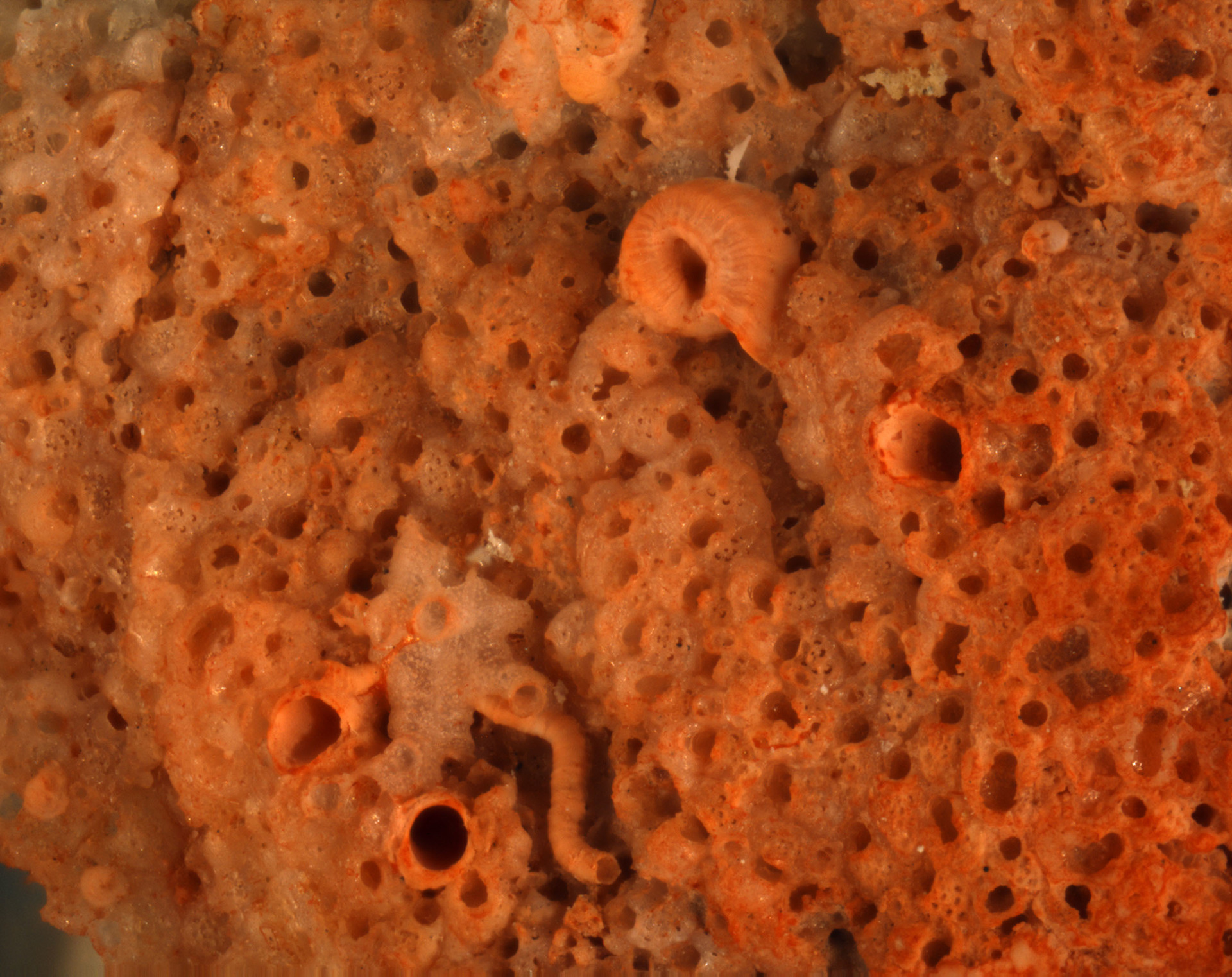
- A Poricella bryozoan, a member of Arachnopusiidae

Scientific classification
- Kingdom: Animalia
- Phylum: Bryozoa
- Class: Gymnolaemata
- Order: Cheilostomatida
- Suborder: Flustrina
- Family: Arachnopusiidae; Busk, 1884

Genera
- Arachnopusia; Brendella; Briarachnia; Poricella; Ramicosticella; Staurosteginopora; Trichinopolia; Trilaminopora

= Arachnopusiidae =

Arachnopusiidae Temporal range: Eocene - Recent

Family of moss animals

The Arachnopusiidae is a family within the bryozoan order Cheilostomatida.
