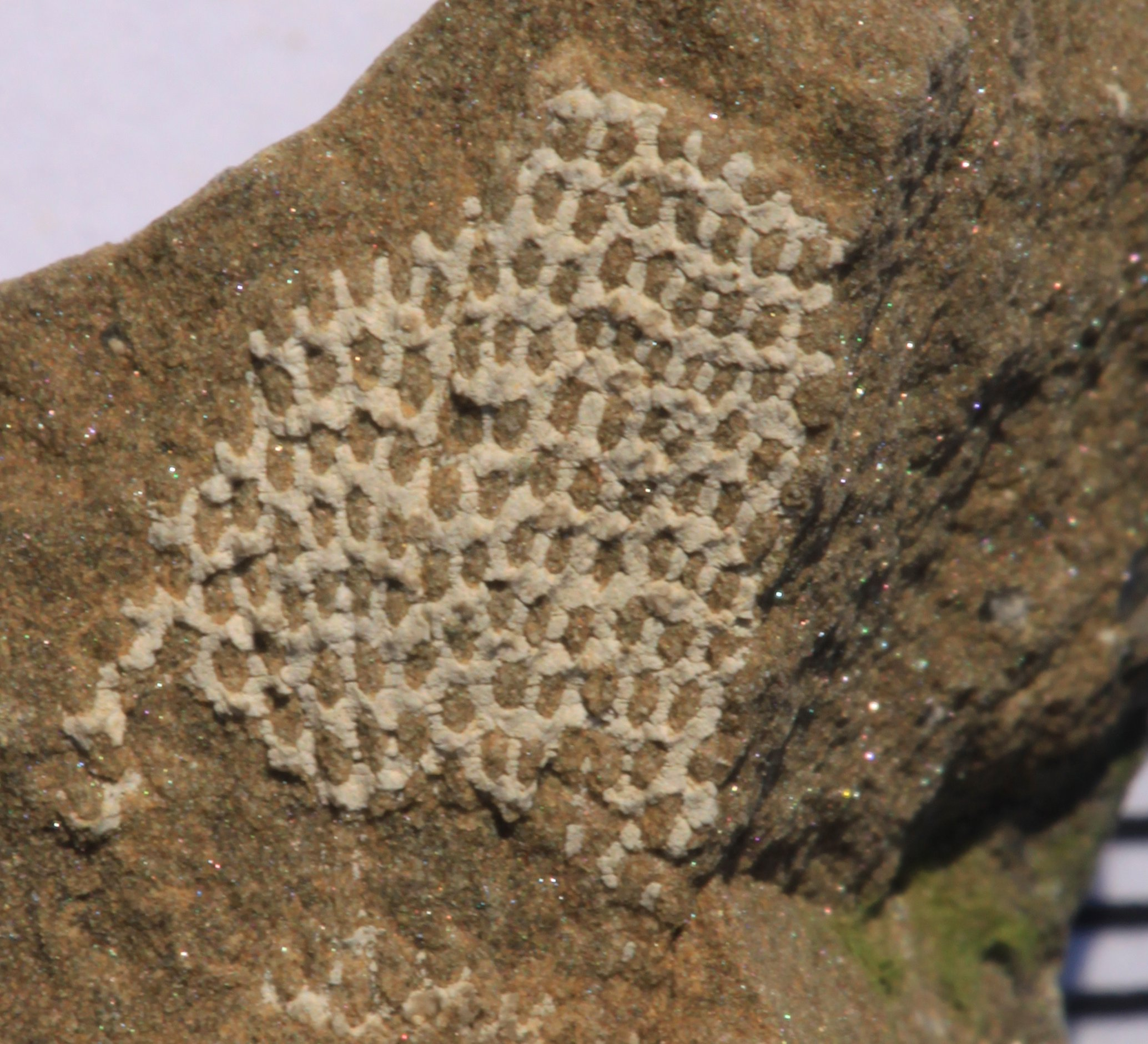
- characteristic mesh of an unidentified Fenestrellid, backside

Scientific classification
- Kingdom: Animalia
- Phylum: Bryozoa
- Class: Stenolaemata
- Order: †Fenestrida
- Family: †Fenestellidae; King, 1850

Synonyms
- Enalloporidae, Sphragioporidae, Thamniscidae Miller, 1889, Fenestrellinidae Bassler, 1935

= Fenestellidae =

Fenestellidae Temporal range: Ordovician–Permian

Extinct family of moss animals

Fenestellidae is a family of bryozoans belonging to the order Fenestrida. The skeleton of its colonies consists of stiff branches that are interconnected by narrower crossbars (or dissepiments). The individuals of the colony (or zooids) inhabit one side of the branches in two parallel rows or two at the branch base and three or more rows further up. Zooids can be recognized as small rimmed pores (or apertures), and in well-preserved specimens the apertures are closed by centrally perforated lids. The front of the branches carries small nodes in a row or zigzag line between the apertures. Branches split (or bifurcate) from time to time giving the colonies a fan-shape or, in the genus Archimedes, create an mesh in the shape of an Archimedes screw.

Like all bryozoans, Fenestellids were epifaunal suspension feeders, that occurred between the early Ordovician and the Triassic. Fossils of this family have been found in marine sediments all over the world.

== Genera ==
- Archaefenestella
- Archimedes
- Bigeyina
- Cavernella
- Exfenestella
- Fabifenestella
- Fenestella
- Filites
- Flexifenestella
- Hemitrypella
- Hinganotrypa
- Isotrypa
- Levifenestella
- Lyrocladia
- Lyropora
- Narynella
- Ogbinofenestella
- Paraptylopora
- Paraseptopora
- Permofenestella
- Polycladiopora
- Pseudounitrypa
- Ptiloporella
- Rectifenestella
- Ryhopora
