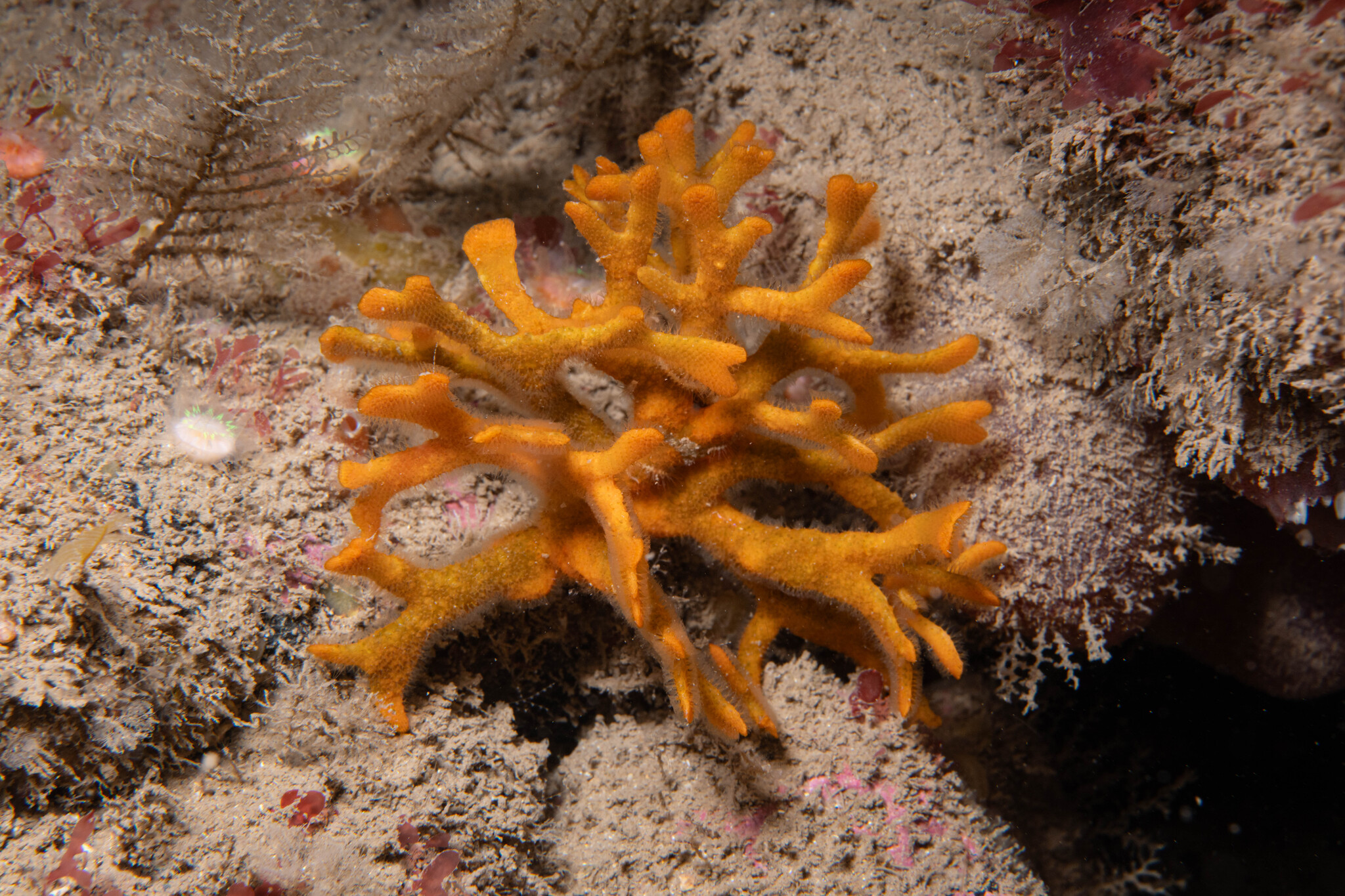
- Porella compressa

Scientific classification
- Kingdom: Animalia
- Phylum: Bryozoa
- Class: Gymnolaemata
- Order: Cheilostomatida
- Family: Bryocryptellidae; Vigneaux, 1949

= Bryocryptellidae =

Family of bryozoans

Bryocryptellidae is a family of bryozoans belonging to the order Cheilostomatida.

Genera:

- Bryocryptella Cossman, 1906
- Buchneria Harmer, 1957
- Cyclocolposa Canu & Bassler, 1923
- Cystisella Canu & Bassler, 1917
- Marguetta Jullien, 1903
- Palmiskenea Bishop & Hayward, 1989
- Porella Gray, 1848
- Reussia Neviani, 1895
- Rhamphosmittina Hayward & Thorpe, 1988
- Simibryocryptella Alvarez, 1991
- Stoliczkella Zágoršek & Gordon, 2014
