= Tessaradomidae =

Scientific classification
- Kingdom: Animalia
- Phylum: Bryozoa
- Class: Gymnolaemata
- Order: Cheilostomatida
- Family: Tessaradomidae

Family of bryozoans

Tessaradomidae is a family of bryozoans belonging to the order Cheilostomatida.

== Genera ==
Genera:

- Beisselina Canu, 1913
- Pachydermopora Gordon, 2002
- Pachythecella Bassler, 1934
