= Romancheinidae =

Scientific classification
- Kingdom: Animalia
- Phylum: Bryozoa
- Class: Gymnolaemata
- Order: Cheilostomatida
- Family: Romancheinidae

Family of bryozoans

Romancheinidae is a family of bryozoans belonging to the order Cheilostomatida.

== Genera ==
Genera:

- Allerescha Gordon, 1989
- Antarcticaetos Hayward & Thorpe, 1988
- Arctonula Gordon & Grischenko, 1994
