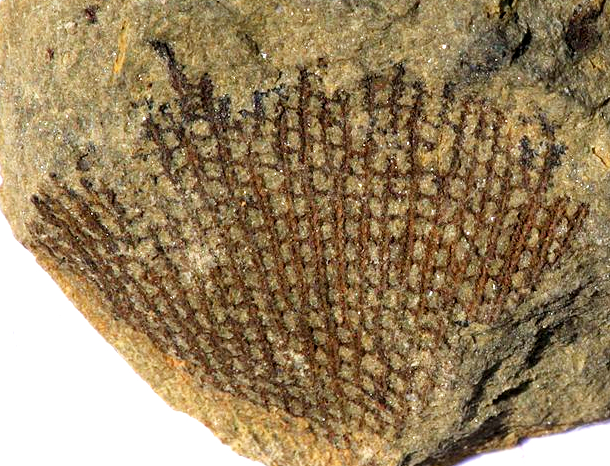
- Fossil Bryozoan of the genus Fenestella

Scientific classification
- Kingdom: Animalia
- Phylum: Bryozoa
- Class: Stenolaemata
- Order: †Fenestrida; Elias & Condra, 1957

= Fenestrida =

Extinct order of bryozoans

Fenestrida is an extinct order of bryozoans in the class Stenolaemata.

As of March 2022, Fossilworks included the following families:

- †Admiratellidae
- †Fenestellidae
- †Fenestraliidae
- †Polyporidae
- †Septoporidae

Other sources consider Fenestrata to be a synonym of Fenestrida, and so include more families.
