= List of the Paleozoic life of Georgia (U.S. state) =

This list of the Paleozoic life of Georgia contains the various prehistoric life-forms whose fossilized remains have been reported from within the US state of Georgia and are between 541 and 252.17 million years of age.

== A ==
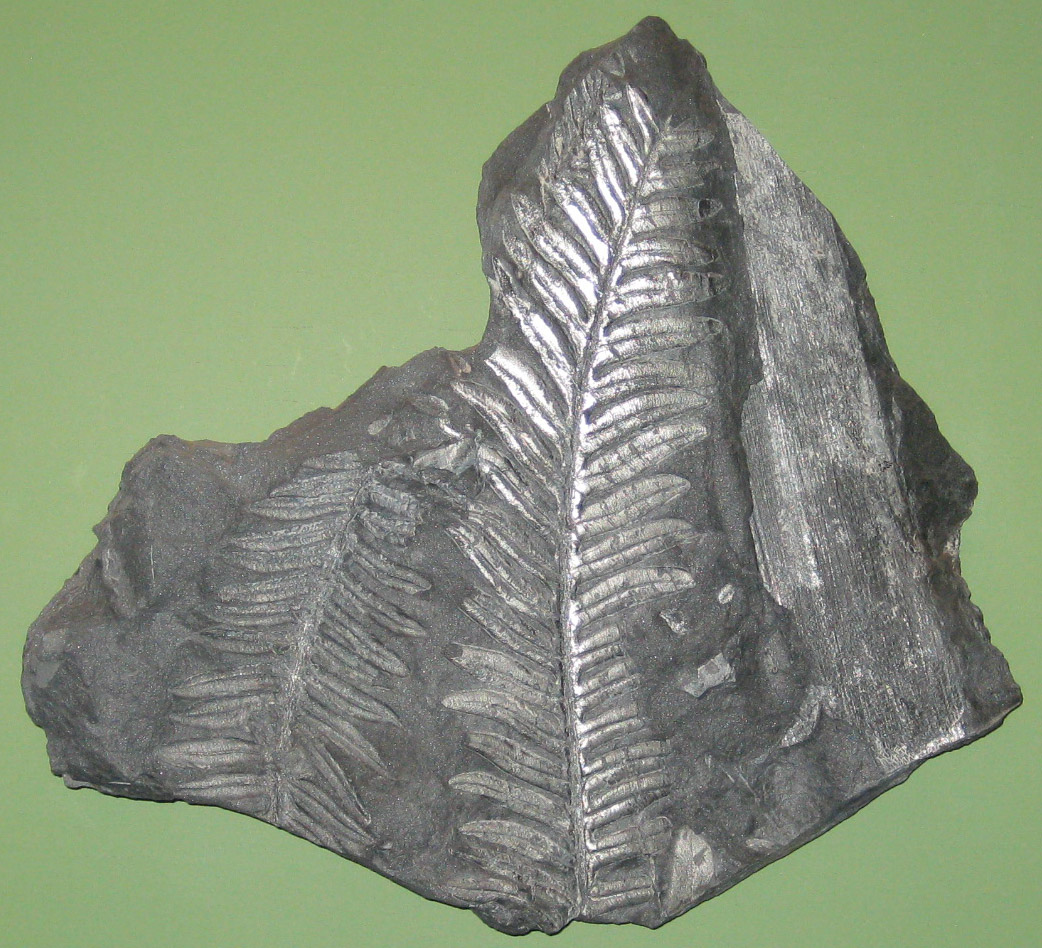
- Fossilized fronds of the Carboniferous-Early Cretaceous seed fern Alethopteris
  †Alethopteris
  - †Alethopteris decurrens
  - †Alethopteris lonchitica
  - †Alethopteris valida
- †Allocatillocrinus
  - †Allocatillocrinus rotundus
- †Alloiopteris
  - †Alloiopteris georgiana – or unidentified comparable form
- †Alokistocare
  - †Alokistocare americanum
- †Ambonychia
  - †Ambonychia intermedia
- †Amplexipora
  - †Amplexipora colombiana
  - †Amplexipora columbiana
- †Amplexus
  - †Amplexus hamiltoniae
- †Anazyga
  - †Anazyga recurvirostra
- †Ancisrorhyncha
  - †Ancisrorhyncha costata
- †Ancistrorhynca
  - †Ancistrorhynca costata
- †Ancistrorhyncha
  - †Ancistrorhyncha costata
- †Aneimites
  - †Aneimites pottsvillensis
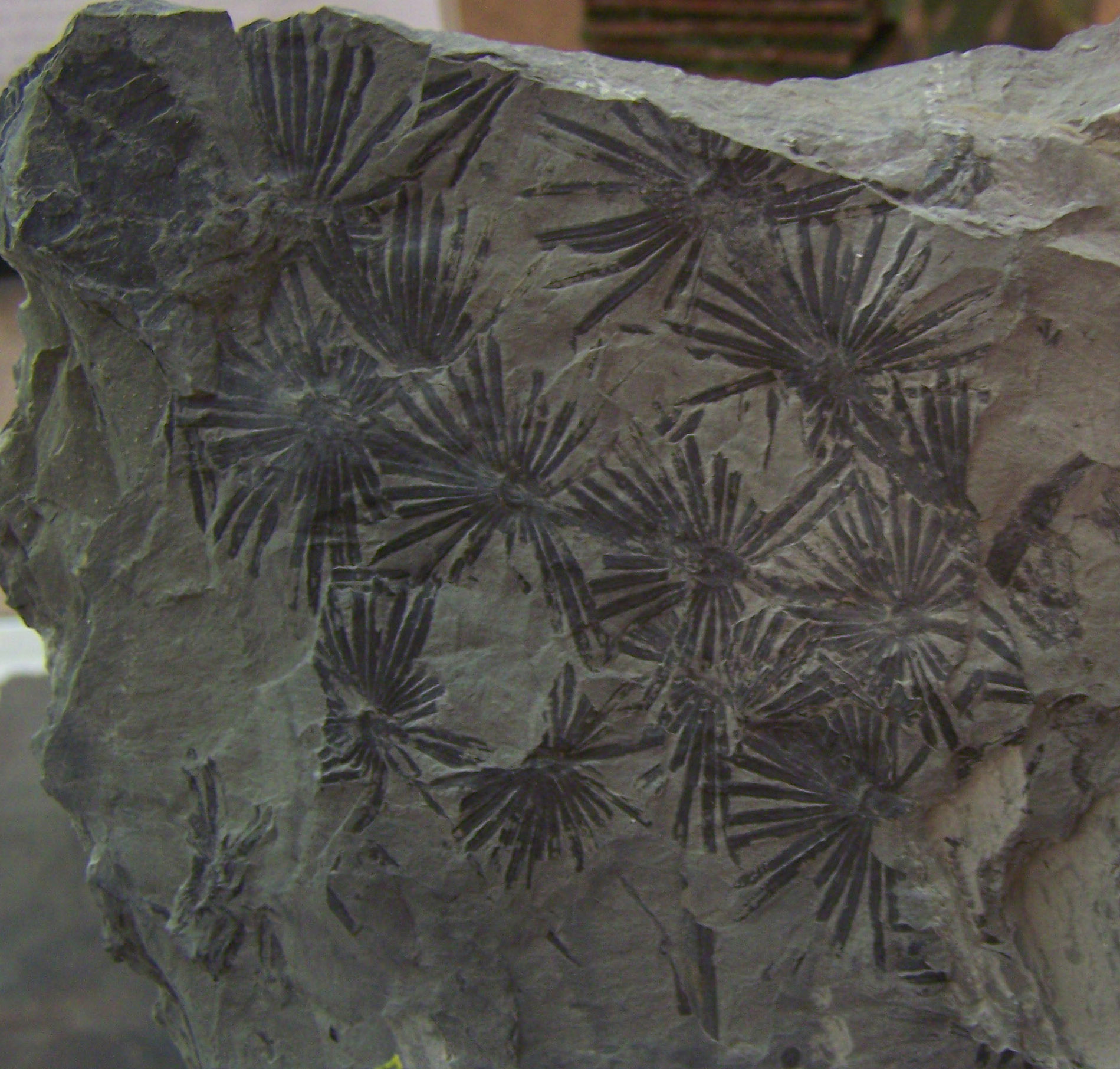
- Fossil of the Carboniferous horsetail relative Annularia
  †Annularia
  - †Annularia asteris
  - †Annularia radiata
- †Anoplotheca
  - †Anoplotheca hemispherica
- †Anthracospirifer
  - †Anthracospirifer leidyi
- †Archaeopteridium
  - †Archaeopteridium tschermacki
- †Archaeorthis – tentative report
- †Archeopteris
- †Archimedes
  - †Archimedes confertus
  - †Archimedes invaginatus
  - †Archimedes magnus
  - †Archimedes swallovanus
- †Armonia
  - †Armonia elongata
- †Arthroclema
  - †Arthroclema armatum
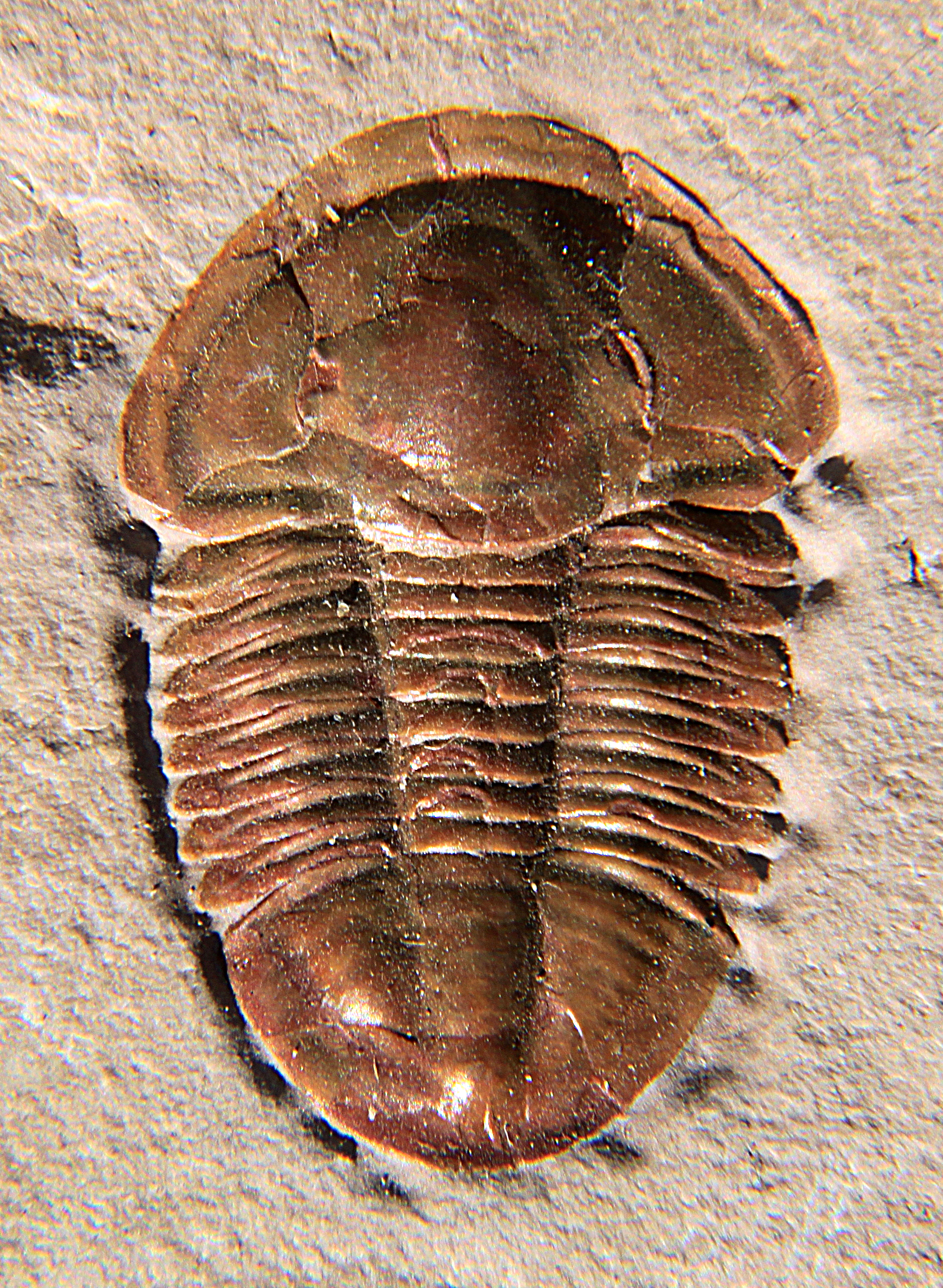
- Fossil of the Cambrian trilobite Asaphiscus
  †Asaphiscus
  - †Asaphiscus gregarius
- †Asphelaspis
  - †Asphelaspis hamblensis
- †Asterophyllites
  - †Asterophyllites charaeformis
  - †Asterophyllites equisetiformis
  - †Asterophyllites grandis
- †Atactoporella
- †Athyrisina
- †Atrypa
  - †Atrypa reticularis
- †Augustoceras

== B ==
- †Baltagnostus
  - †Baltagnostus centerensis
- †Bathocypris
  - †Bathocypris cylindrica
- †Bathyurus
- †Batostoma
  - †Batostoma implicatum
  - †Batostoma magnapora
  - †Batostoma minnesotense
  - †Batostoma varum
  - †Batostoma winchelli
- †Blainia
  - †Blainia gregaria
- †Bonneterrina – tentative report
- †Brooksella
  - †Brooksella alternata

== C ==
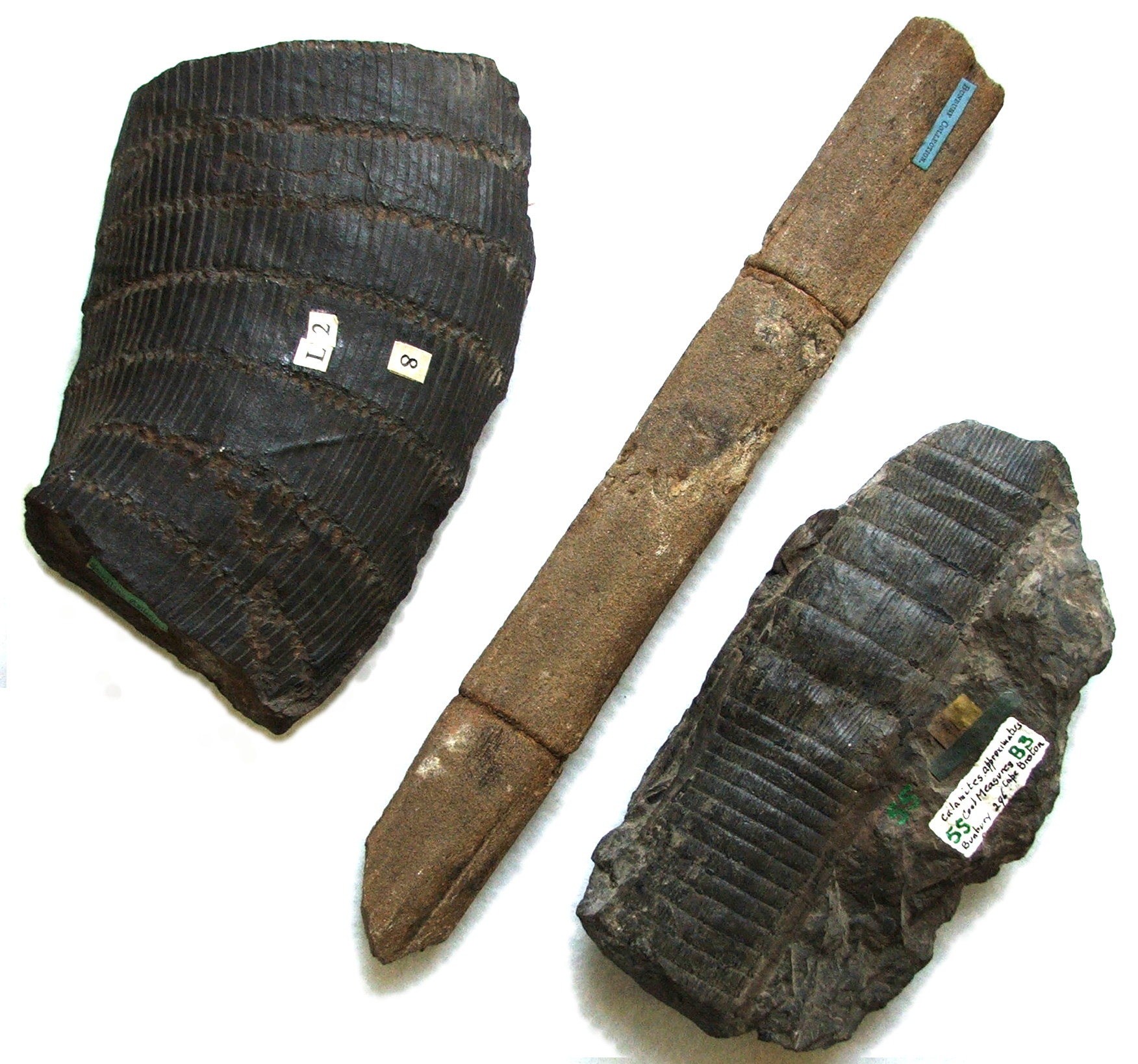
- Fossilized stems from the Carboniferous-Permian horsetail relative Calamites
  †Calamites
  - †Calamites cistiiformis
  - †Calamites suckowi
- †Callipteridium
  - †Callipteridium membranaceum – or unidentified comparable form
- †Callopora
  - †Callopora andrewsi
  - †Callopora dalei
  - †Callopora dumalis
  - †Callopora goodhuensis
  - †Callopora multitabulata
  - †Callopora pulchella – tentative report
  - †Callopora ramosa
  - †Callopora sigillaroides
  - †Callopora subnodosa
- †Calymene
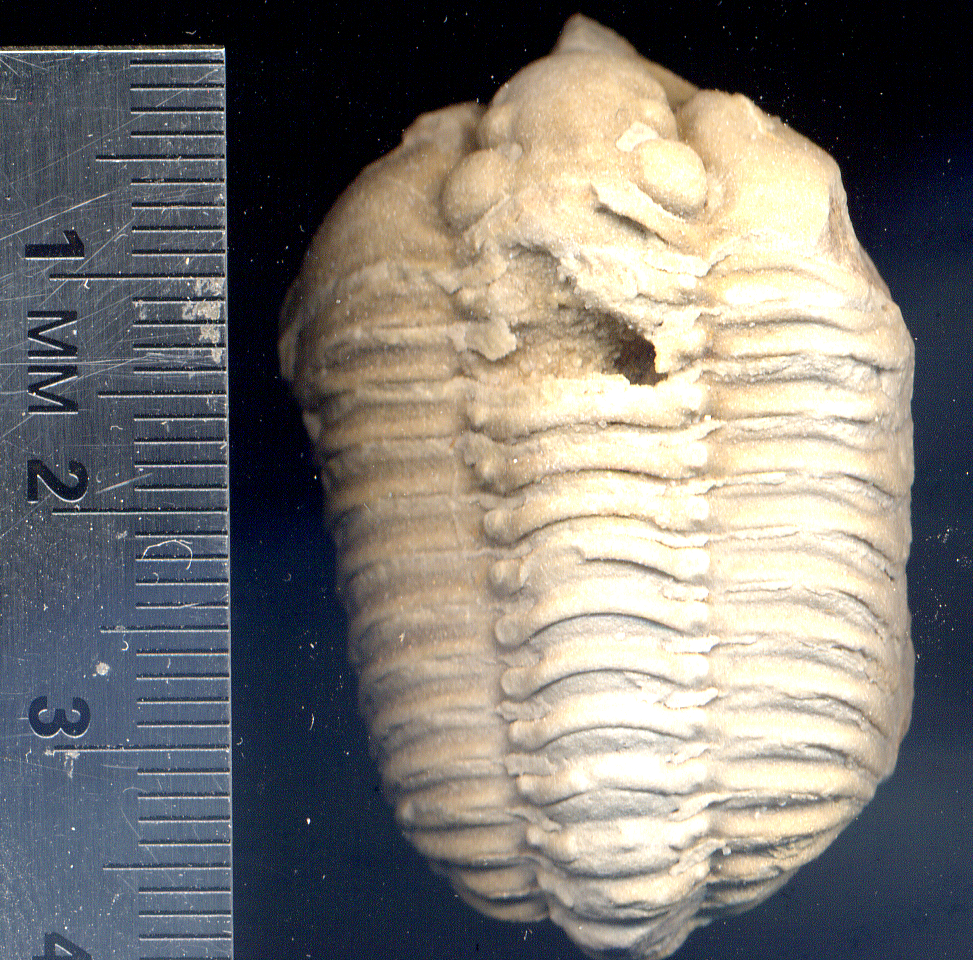
  - Fossil of the Silurian trilobite Calymene celebra
    †Calymene celebra
  - †Calymene platys
  - †Calymene ragdesi
- †Calyptaulax
  - †Calyptaulax callicephala
- †Camarotoechia
- †Campophyllum
- †Campophylum
  - †Campophylum gasperense
- †Carpentertypus
  - †Carpentertypus durhami – type locality for species
- †Ceratopea
  - †Ceratopea calceoliformis
  - †Ceratopea grandis – or unidentified comparable form
  - †Ceratopea sulcata
- †Chaetetes
- †Choctawites
  - †Choctawites kentuckiensis
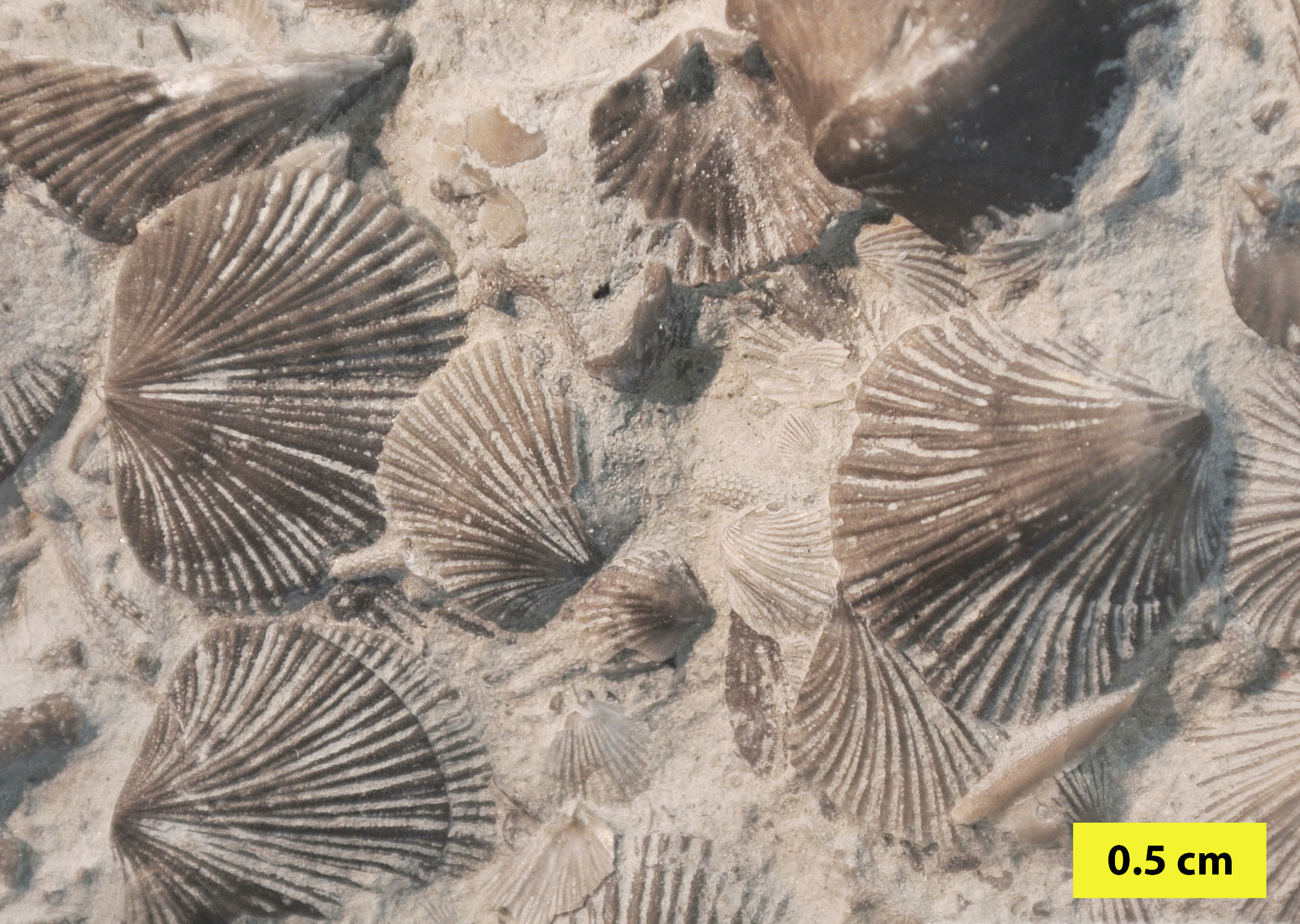
- Assemblage of fossilized shells of the Ordovician brachiopod Cincinnetina
  †Cincinnetina
  - †Cincinnetina meeki
  - †Cincinnetina multisecta
- †Cincosaurus
  - †Cincosaurus cobbi
- †Cleistopora
- †Clyclostomiceras
  - †Clyclostomiceras cassinense
- †Columnaria
  - †Columnaria halli
- †Constellaria
  - †Constellaria prominens
- †Coosella
  - †Coosella curticei
- †Coosia
  - †Coosia superba
- †Cordaites
  - †Cordaites communis
  - †Cordaites serpens
- †Cryptophagmus
  - †Cryptophagmus antiquatus
- †Cryptophragmus
  - †Cryptophragmus antiquatus
- †Cyclospira
- †Cyclostomiceras
  - †Cyclostomiceras cassinense
- †Cyperites
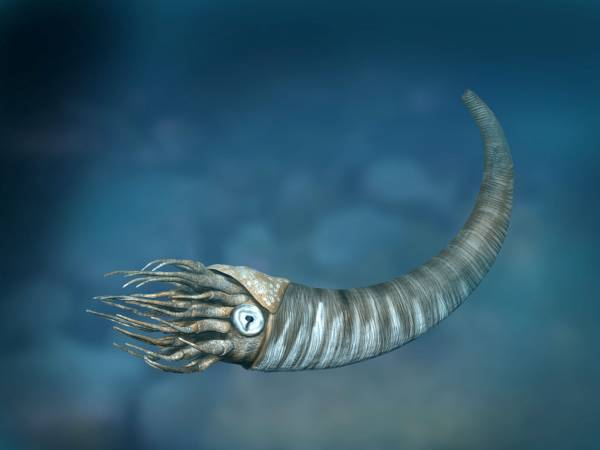
- Restoration of the Cambrian-Middle Devonian nautiloid cephalopod Cyrtoceras
  †Cyrtoceras
  - †Cyrtoceras vallandinghami

== D ==
- †Dalmanella
  - †Dalmanella edgewoodensis
  - †Dalmanella elegantula
- †Dalmanitina
  - †Dalmanitina arkansana
- †Dekayella
  - †Dekayella praenuntia
  - †Dekayella ulrichi
- †Dekayia
  - †Dekayia aspera
- †Desmorthis
  - †Desmorthis nevadensis
- †Dielasma
  - †Dielasma arkansanum
  - †Dielasma illinoisensis
- †Dinorthis
  - †Dinorthis atavoides – or unidentified comparable form
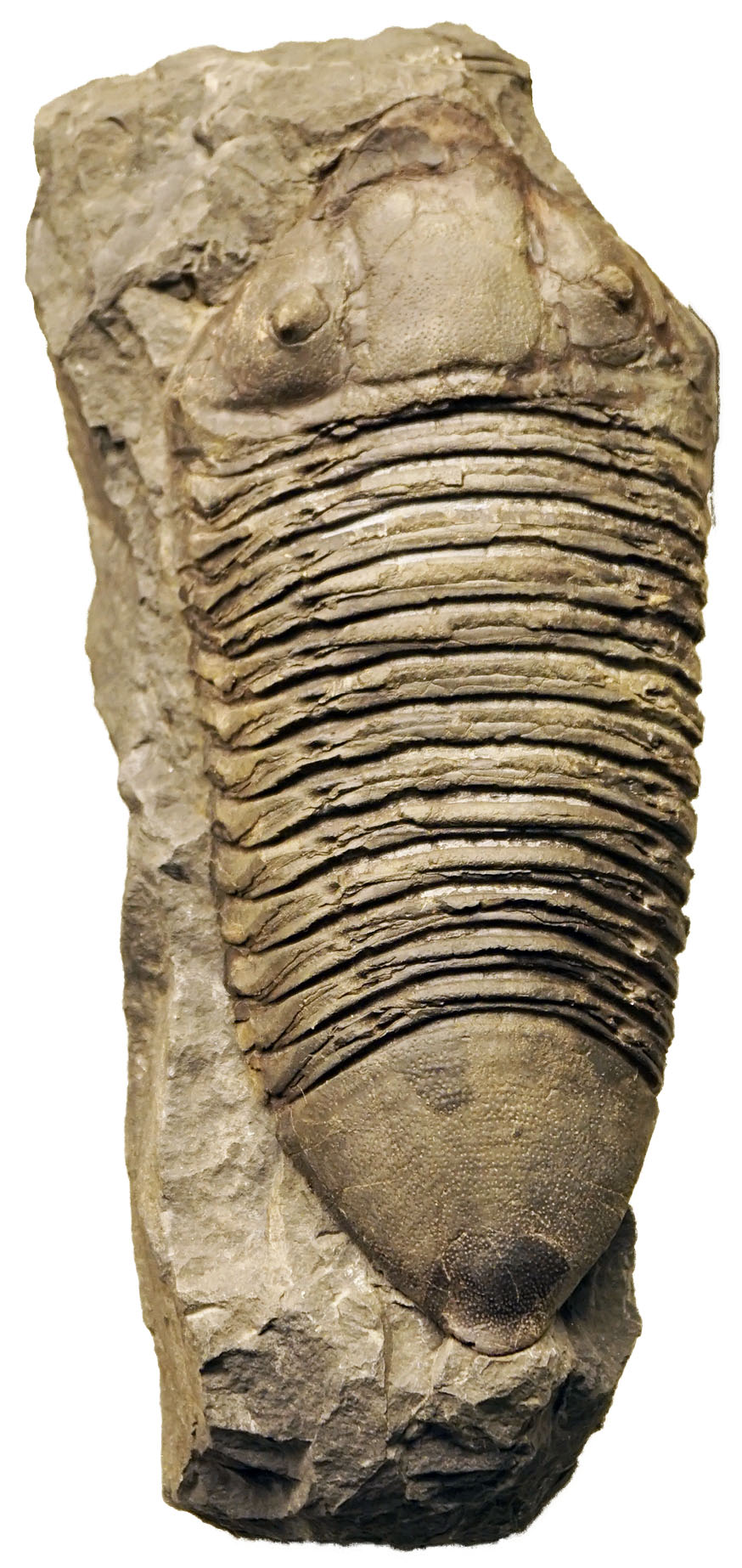
- Fossil of the Late Ordovician-Middle Devonian trilobite Dipleura
  †Dipleura
  - †Dipleura dekayi
- †Diplothmena
  - †Diplothmena cheathami
- †Doleroides
  - †Doleroides gibbosus

== E ==
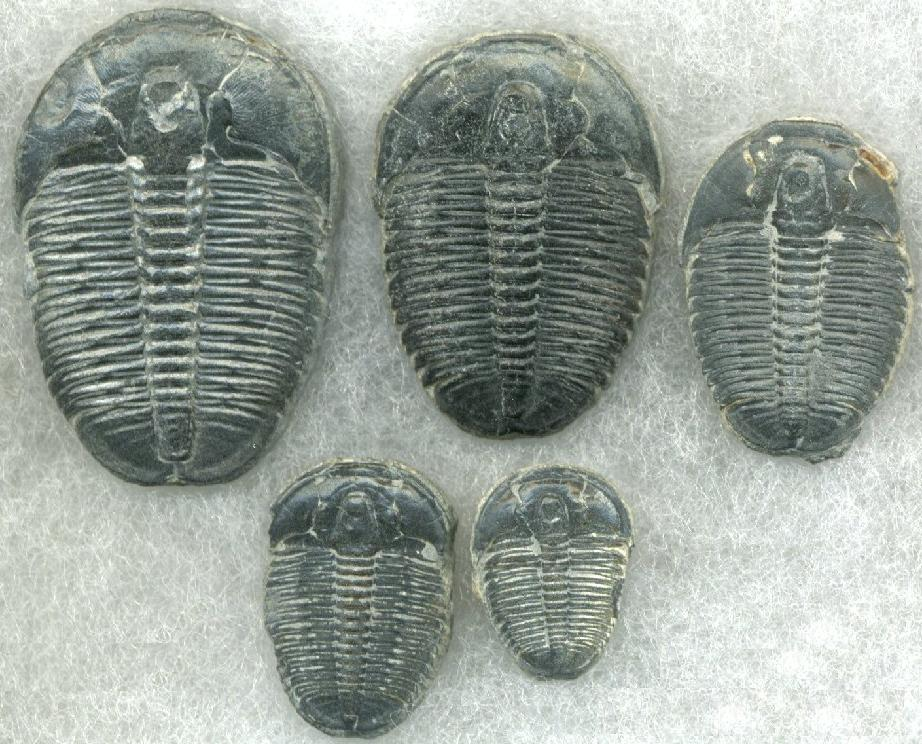
- Fossils at different stages of development of the Cambrian trilobite Elrathia
  †Elrathia
  - †Elrathia antiquata
- †Elrathiella
  - †Elrathiella buttsi
- †Elrathina – tentative report
- †Eodictyonella (formerly Dictyonella)
  - †Eodictyonella reticulata
- †Eospirifer
  - †Eospirifer radiatus
- †Eremopteris
  - †Eremopteris microphylla – or unidentified comparable form
- †Eridotrypa
  - †Eridotrypa mutabilis
- †Eroicaspira
  - †Eroicaspira bellicincta
- †Escharopora
  - †Escharopora falciformis
  - †Escharopora subrecta
- †Eteraspis
  - †Eteraspis glabra
- †Eumetria
  - †Eumetria verneuiliana
- †Eurydictya
  - †Eurydictya multipora
- †Eusphenopteris
  - †Eusphenopteris aldrichii

== F ==
- †Fascifera
  - †Fascifera subcarinata
- †Favistella
  - †Favistella halli
- †Favosites
  - †Favosites turbinatus
- †Fenestrellina
  - †Fenestrellina santiludowici
  - †Fenestrellina tenax
- †Finkelnburgia
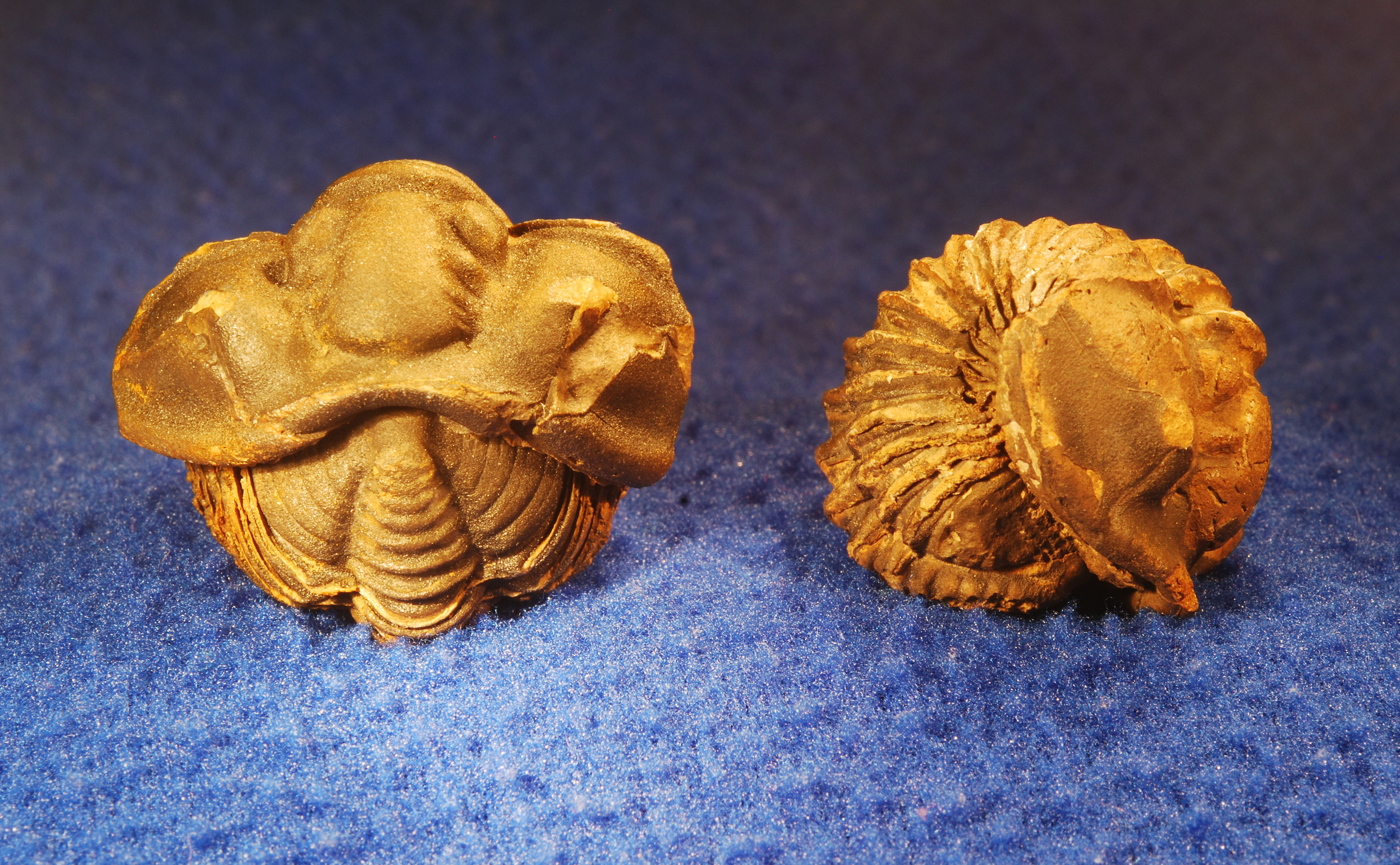
- Front (left) and right side (right) views of an enrolled fossil of the Middle Ordovician-Silurian trilobite Flexicalymene
  †Flexicalymene

== G ==
- †Glyphaspis
  - †Glyphaspis capella – or unidentified comparable form
- †Glyprorthis
  - †Glyprorthis bellarugosa
- †Glyptorthis
  - †Glyptorthis bellarugosa
  - †Glyptorthis insculpta
  - †Glyptorthis multicostellata – type locality for species
- †Gonioceras
  - †Gonioceras anceps

== H ==
- †Hadrophyllum
  - †Hadrophyllum ovale
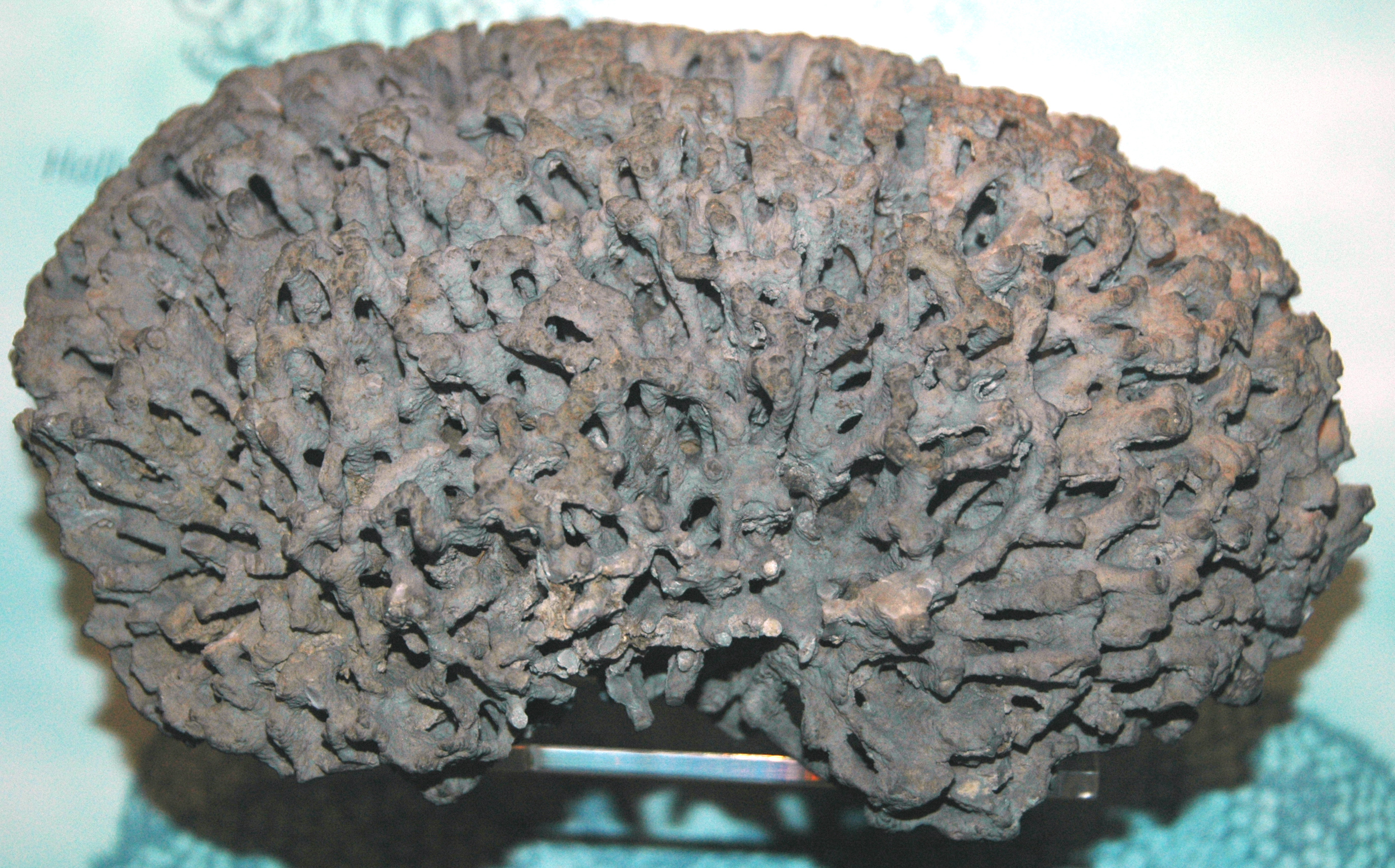
- Fossil of the Ordovician bryozoan ("moss animal") Hallopora
  †Hallopora
  - †Hallopora dalei
- †Hebertella
  - †Hebertella frankfortenis
  - †Hebertella frankfortensis
  - †Hebertella occidentalis
  - †Hebertella sinuata
- †Helicotoma
  - †Helicotoma tennesseensis
- †Helopora
  - †Helopora spiniformis
- †Hemiphragmus
  - †Hemiphragmus imperfectus
- †Hesperorthis
  - †Hesperorthis tricenaria
- †Heterotrypa
  - †Heterotrypa frondosa
  - †Heterotrypa parvulipora
- †Hiscobeccus
  - †Hiscobeccus capax
- †Hocospermum
- †Holcacephalus – tentative report
- †Holcospermum
- †Homotrypa
  - †Homotrypa cincinnatiensis
  - †Homotrypa curvata
  - †Homotrypa cylindrica
  - †Homotrypa flabellaris
  - †Homotrypa grandis
  - †Homotrypa minnesotensis
  - †Homotrypa obliqua
  - †Homotrypa rubramosa
  - †Homotrypa subramosa
- †Hormotoma
  - †Hormotoma gracilis
- †Horomotoma
  - †Horomotoma bellicincta

== I ==
- †Idiostrophis
- †Isochilina
  - †Isochilina nelsoni
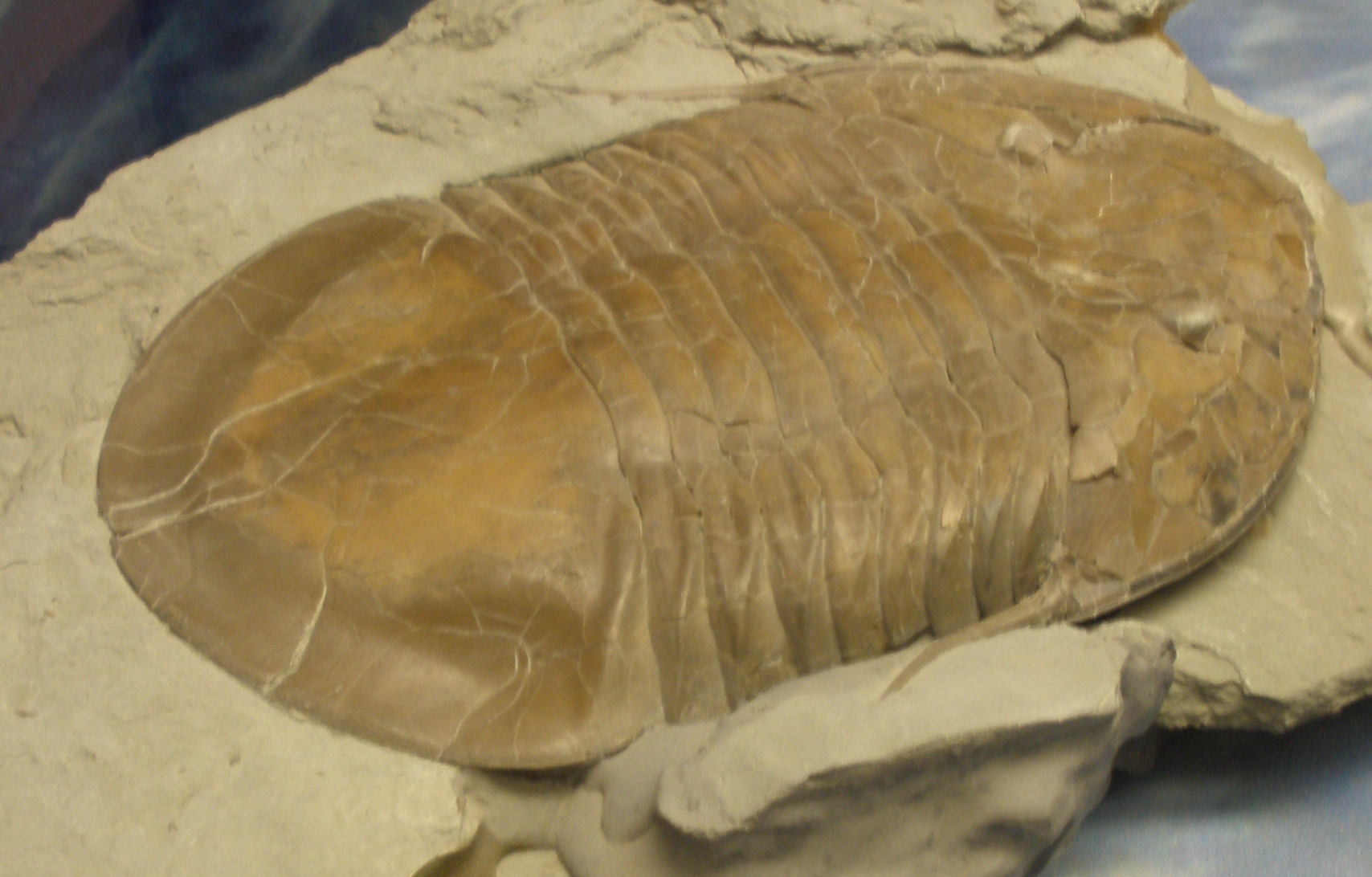
- Fossil of the Middle-Late Ordovician giant trilobite Isotelus.
  †Isotelus
  - †Isotelus brachycephalus

== K ==
- †Kenenglundii
  - †Kenenglundii penningtonensis
- †Kingopora

== L ==
- †Lambeophyllum
  - †Lambeophyllum profundum
- †Lambeophylum
  - †Lambeophylum profundum
- †Leanospira
- †Lecanospira
  - †Lecanospira compacta
  - †Lecanospira knoxvillensis – type locality for species
  - †Lecanospira salteri – or unidentified comparable form
  - †Lecanospira sigmoidea
- †Leperditia
  - †Leperditia fabulites
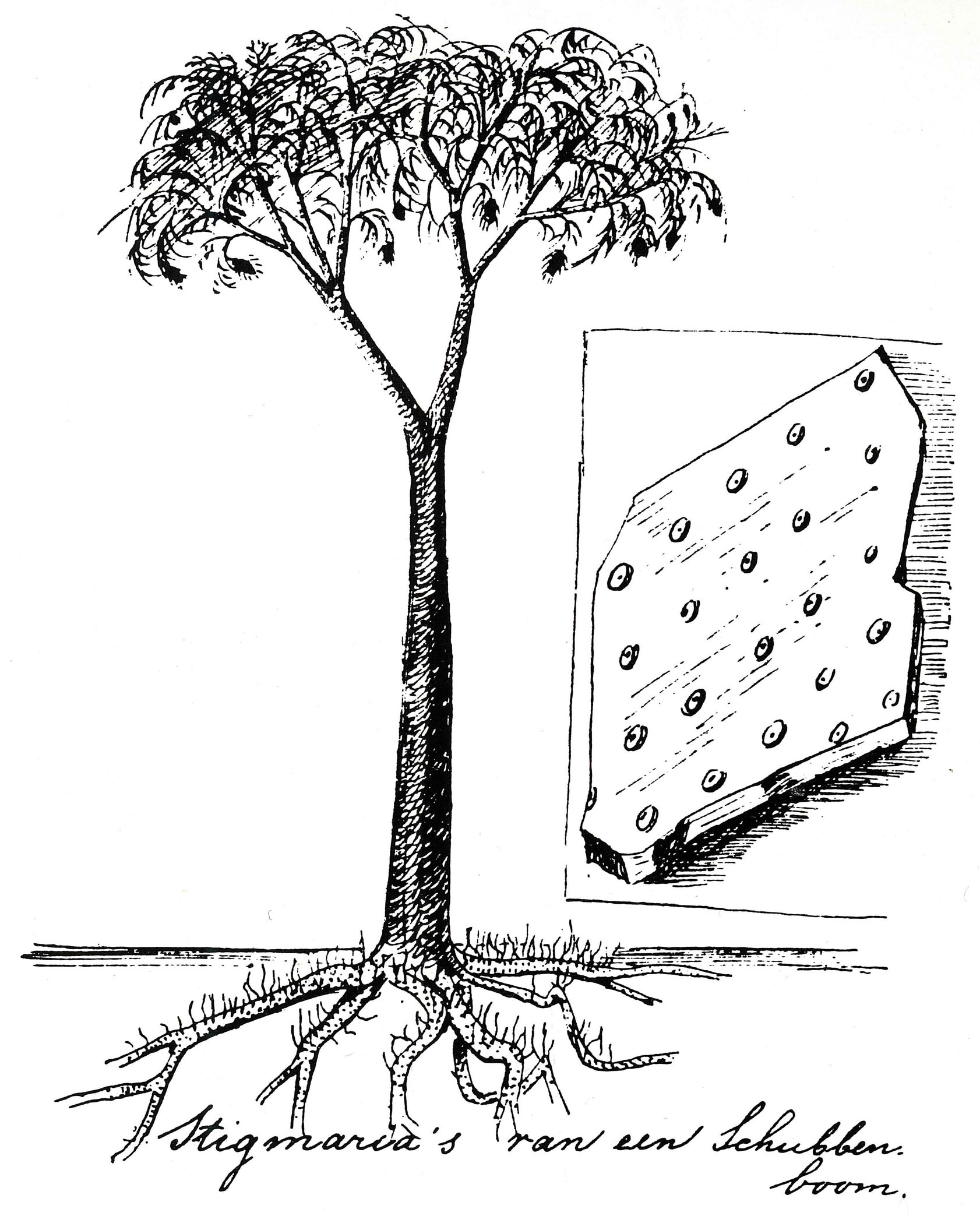
- Restoration of the Carboniferous-Late Triassic club moss relative Lepidodendron. Eli Heimans (1911).
  †Lepidodendron
  - †Lepidodendron aculeatum
  - †Lepidodendron obovatum
  - †Lepidodendron rimosum
- †Lepidophloios
  - †Lepidophloios laricinus
- †Lepidostrobophyllum
- †Leptaena
- †Leptotrypa
  - †Leptotrypa clavis
- †Lichenaria
- †Lingula
- †Liospira
  - †Liospira progne
  - †Liospira vitruvia
- †Liospita
- †Lithostrotion
  - †Lithostrotion proliferum
- †Lithostrotionella
  - †Lithostrotionella castelnaui
- †Lophospira
  - †Lophospira burginensis
  - †Lophospira serrulata
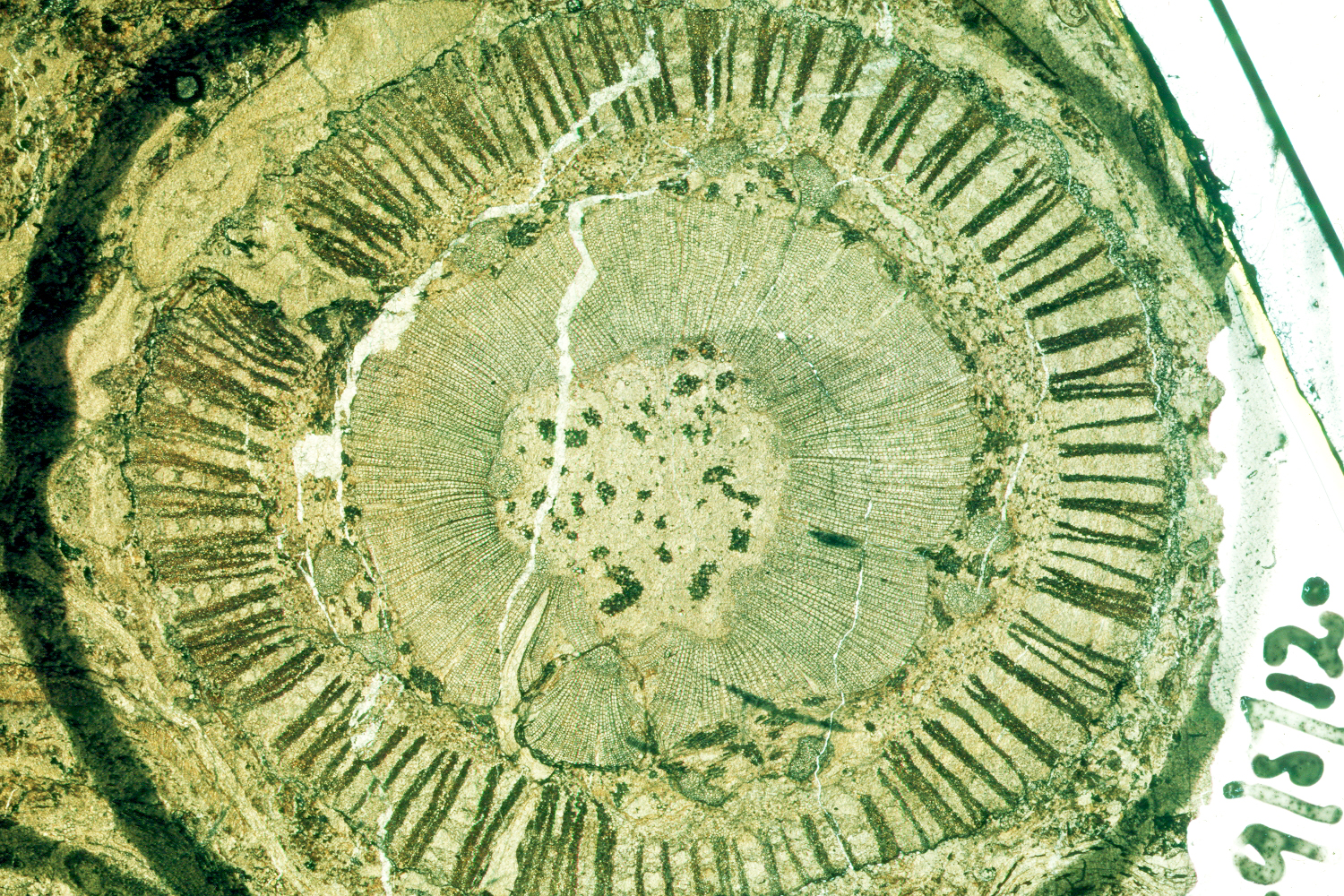
- Fossil in cross section of the Carboniferous seed fern stem Lyginopteris
  †Lyginopteris
- †Lyropora
  - †Lyropora ranosculum

== M ==
- †Maclurites
- †Macrostachya
- †Meekopora
  - †Meekopora clausa
- †Michelinoceras
  - †Michelinoceras multicameratum
  - †Michelinoceras sociale
- †Mimella
  - †Mimella borealis
  - †Mimella melonica
- †Monotrypa
  - †Monotrypa intabulata
- †Monticulipora
- †Monticulopora
- †Multicostata
- †Multicostella
- †Murchisonia
  - †Murchisonia subulata

== N ==
- †Neuralethopteris
  - †Neuralethopteris biformis
  - †Neuralethopteris larishii
  - †Neuralethopteris pocahontas
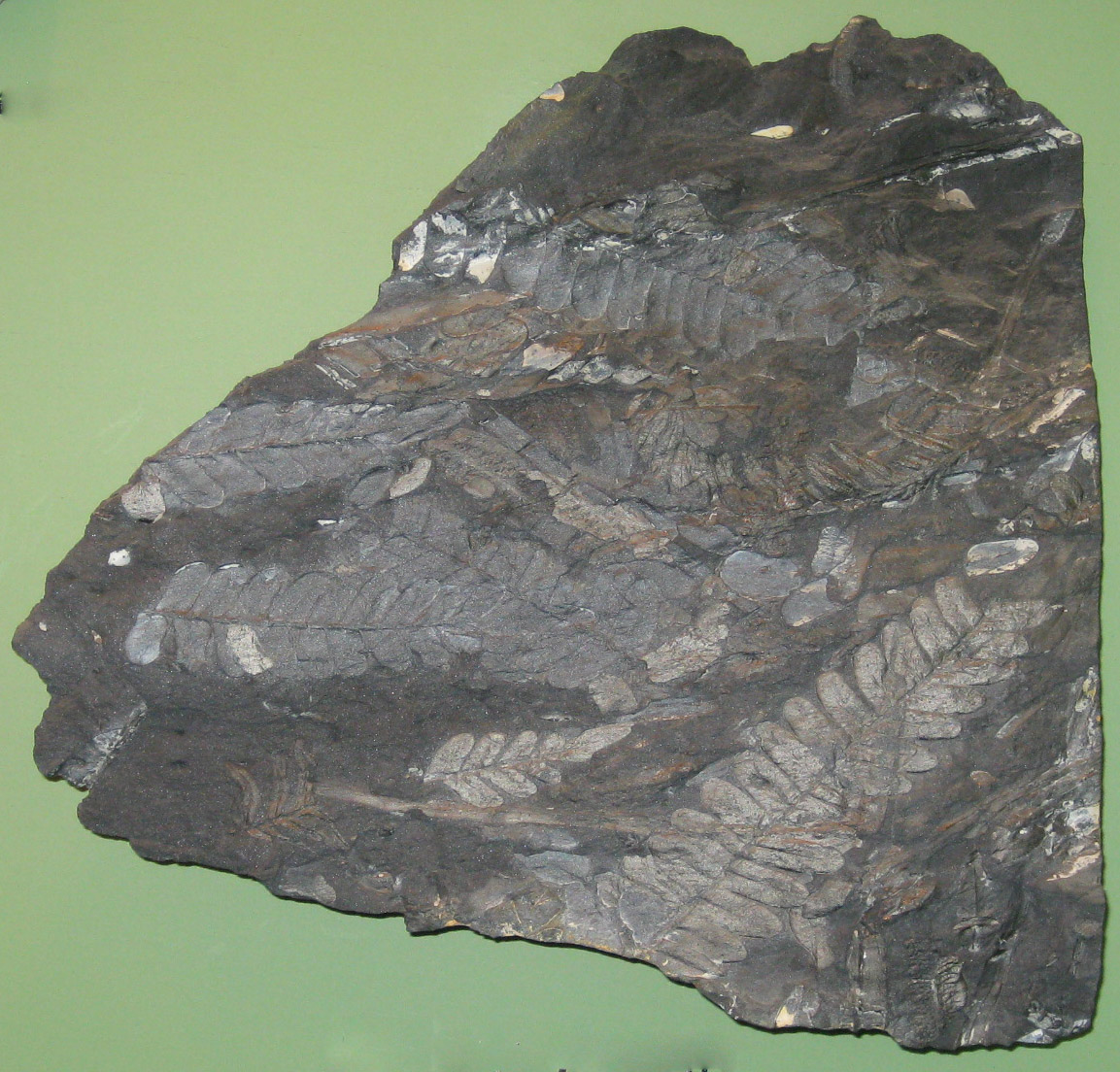
- Fronds of the Carboniferous seed fern Neuropteris
  †Neuropteris
  - †Neuropteris flexuosa
  - †Neuropteris heterophylla – or unidentified comparable form
  - †Neuropteris hollandica
  - †Neuropteris plicata
  - †Neuropteris schlehani
  - †Neuropteris smithi
  - †Neuropteris smithii
- †Nicholsonella

== O ==
- †Oepikina
  - †Oepikina minnesotensis
- †Ophileta
  - †Ophileta complanata
  - †Ophileta laevata
- †Orospira
- †Orthoceras
- †Orthorhynchula
  - †Orthorhynchula linneyi
- †Oxoplecia
  - †Oxoplecia holstonensis

== P ==
- †Pachidictya
- †Pachydictya
  - †Pachydictya foliata
- †Palmatopteris
  - †Palmatopteris furcata
- †Paupospira
  - †Paupospira bowdeni
  - †Paupospira burginensis
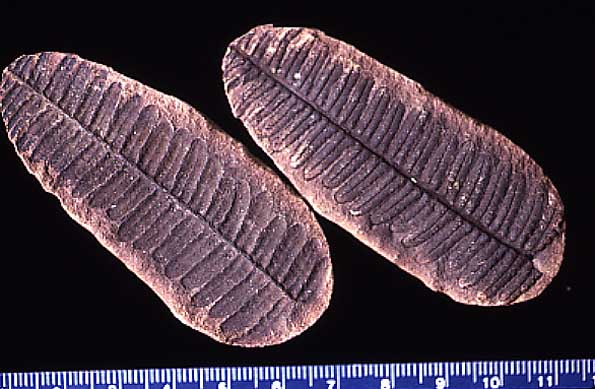
- Fossils of the Late Devonian-Permian fern-like fronds Pecopteris
  †Pecopteris
  - †Pecopteris elliptica – tentative report
- †Pelagiella
- †Penniretopora
- †Pentamerus
  - †Pentamerus oblongus
- †Pentremites
  - †Pentremites cava
- †Peronopsis
  - †Peronopsis cuneifera – or unidentified comparable form
- †Petigophora
- †Petogophora
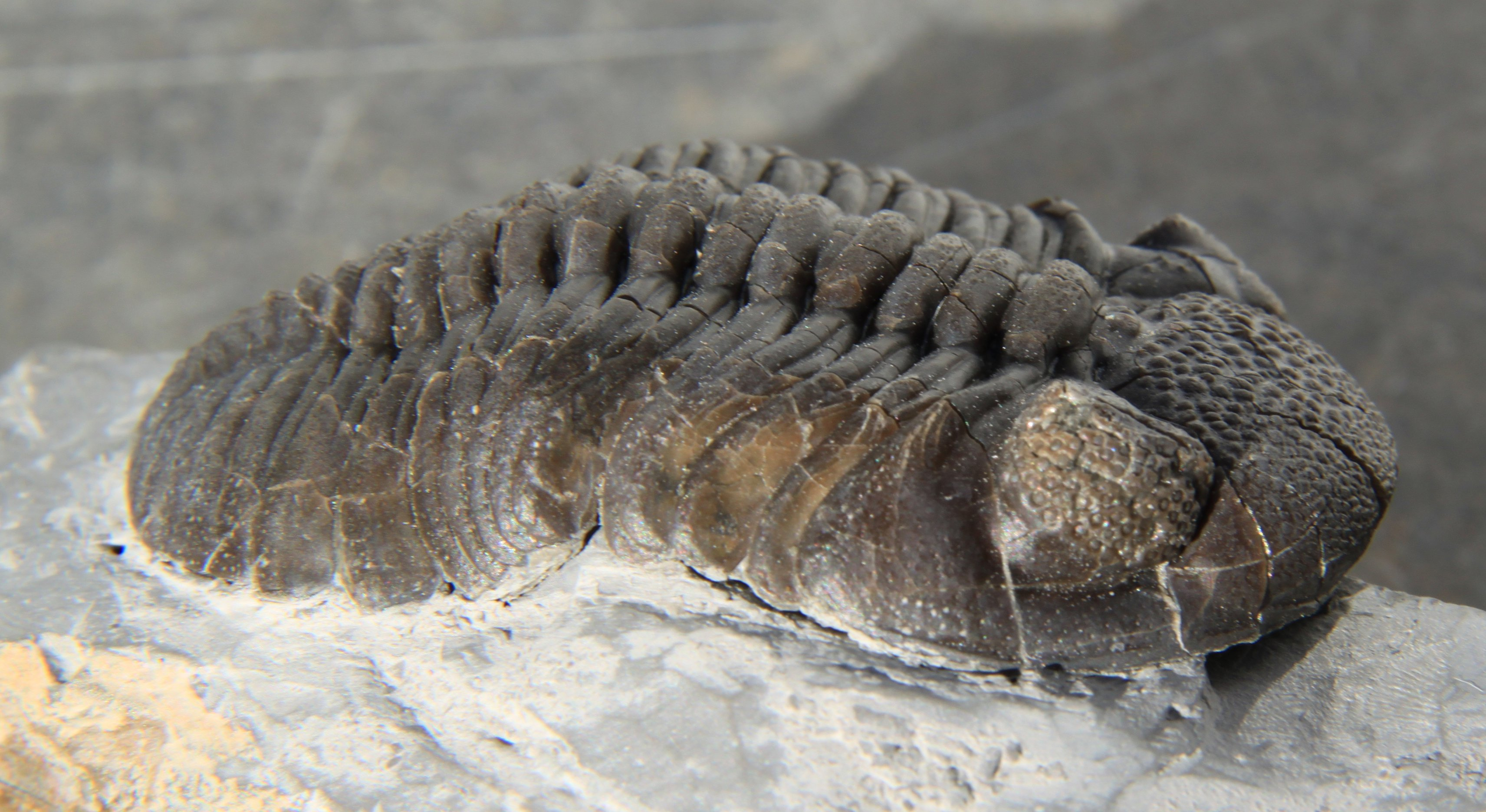
- Fossil of the Late Ordovician-Late Devonian trilobite Phacops
  †Phacops
  - †Phacops pulchellus
- †Phragmolites
  - †Phragmolites fimbriata
- †Phragmolutes
  - †Phragmolutes fimbriatus
- †Pionodema
  - †Pionodema miniscula
  - †Pionodema minuscula
  - †Pionodema subaequata
- †Platycrinites
  - †Platycrinites hemisphericus
- †Platystophia
  - †Platystophia trentonensis
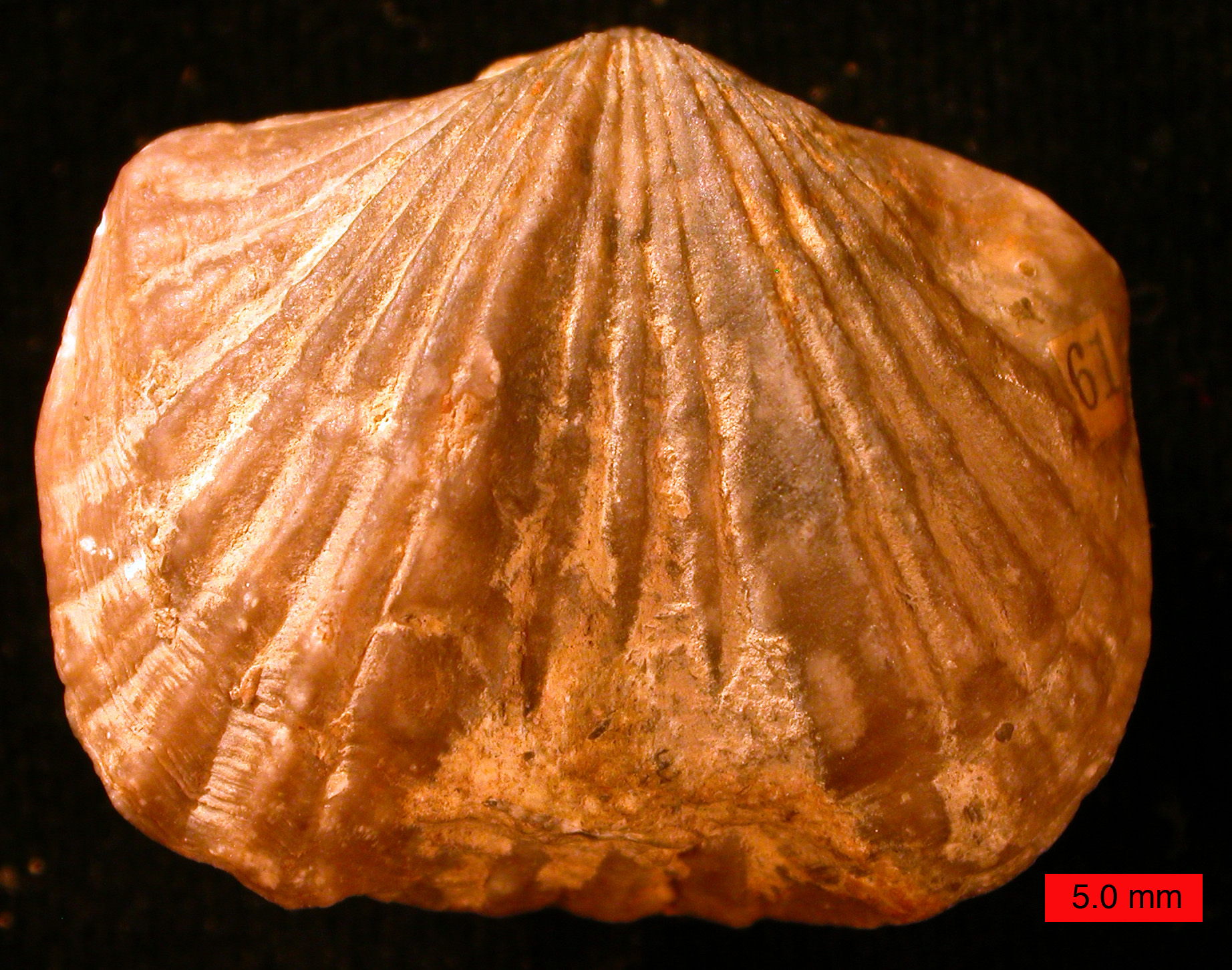
- Fossilized shell of the Middle Ordovician-Silurian brachiopod Platystrophia
  †Platystrophia
  - †Platystrophia acutilirata
  - †Platystrophia colbiensis
  - †Platystrophia crassa
  - †Platystrophia elegantula
  - †Platystrophia juvensis
  - †Platystrophia laticosta
  - †Platystrophia ponderosa
  - †Platystrophia precursor
  - †Platystrophia strigosa
  - †Platystrophia sublaticosa
  - †Platystrophia trentonensis
- †Plectorthis
  - †Plectorthis fissicosta
  - †Plectorthis plicatella
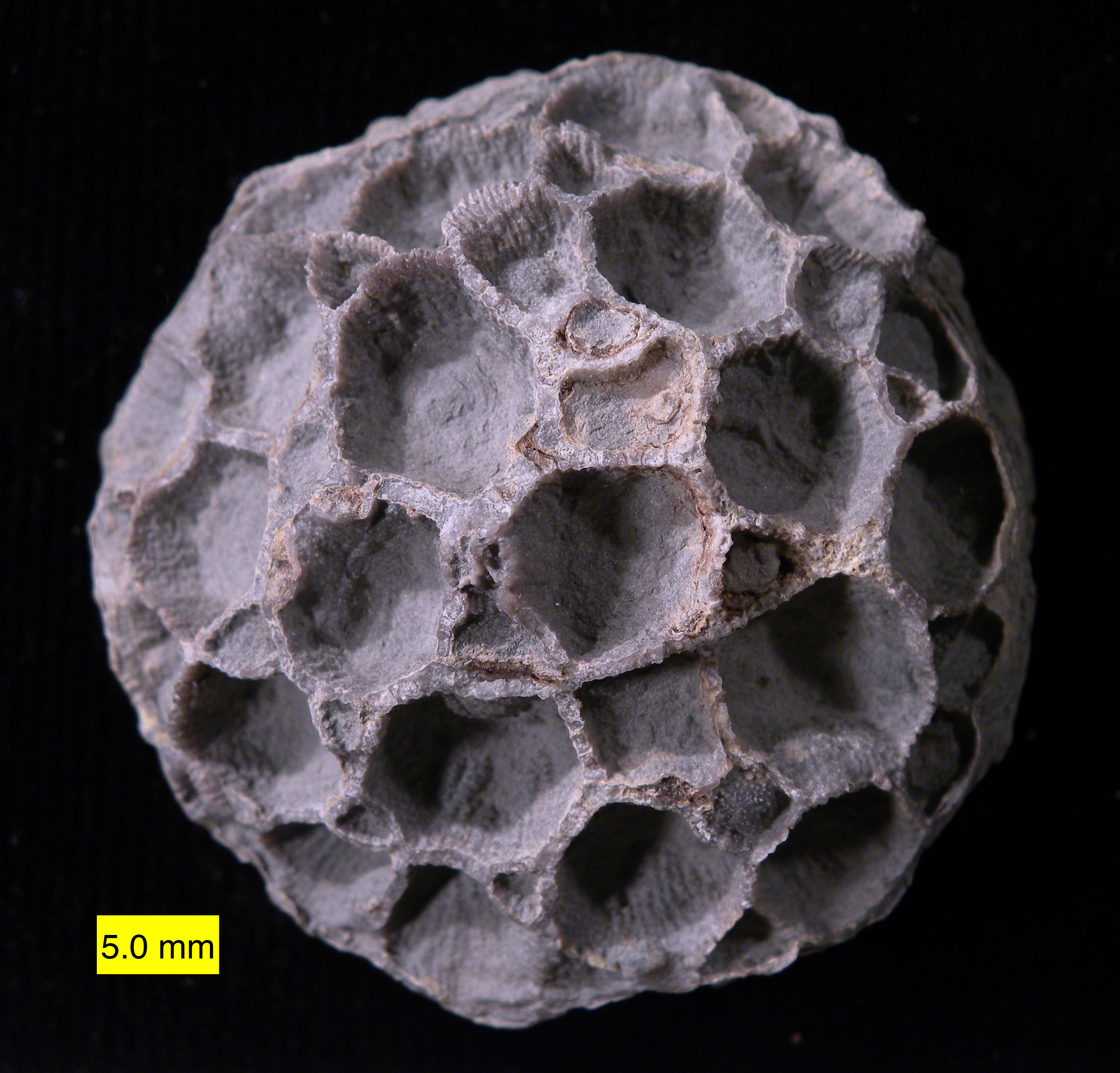
- Fossil of the Silurian-Carboniferous tabulate coral Pleurodictyum
  †Pleurodictyum
- †Prasopora
  - †Prasopora hospitalis
- †Prismostylus
  - †Prismostylus fibratum
- †Productina
- †Protozyga

== R ==
- †Rafinesquina
  - †Rafinesquina alternata
  - †Rafinesquina deltoidea – or unidentified comparable form
  - †Rafinesquina trentonensis
- †Raphistoma
- †Reserella
  - †Reserella rogata
- †Resserella
  - †Resserella rogata
- †Rhinidictya
  - †Rhinidictya mutabilis
- †Rhipidomella
- †Rhipidomena
  - †Rhipidomena tennesseensis
- †Rhombotrypa
- †Rhynchotrema
  - †Rhynchotrema argenturbiem
  - †Rhynchotrema increbescens
  - †Rhynchotrema minnesotensis
- †Rhynidictya
  - †Rhynidictya mutabilis
- †Rostricella
  - †Rostricella plena
- Rostricellula
  - †Rostricellula rostrata

== S ==
- †Scalites
  - †Scalites peracutum
- †Septopora
  - †Septopora subquadrans
- †Sibulites
  - †Sibulites subelongatus – or unidentified related form
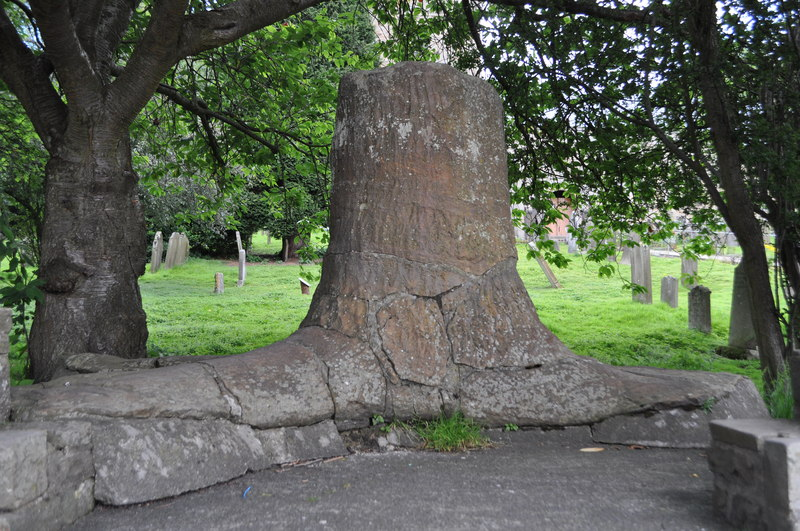
- Fossilized stump of the Carboniferous-Permian club moss relative Sigillaria
  †Sigillaria
  - †Sigillaria elegans
  - †Sigillaria mammillaris – tentative report
- †Solenopleurella
  - †Solenopleurella buttsi
- †Solenopora
  - †Solenopora compacta
- †Sowerbyella
  - †Sowerbyella curdsvillensis
- †Sphenophyllum
  - †Sphenophyllum cuneifolium
  - †Sphenophyllum tenue
- †Sphenopteris
  - †Sphenopteris deltiformis
  - †Sphenopteris elegans – or unidentified comparable form
  - †Sphenopteris hoeninghausi
  - †Sphenopteris hoeninghausii
  - †Sphenopteris pottsvillea
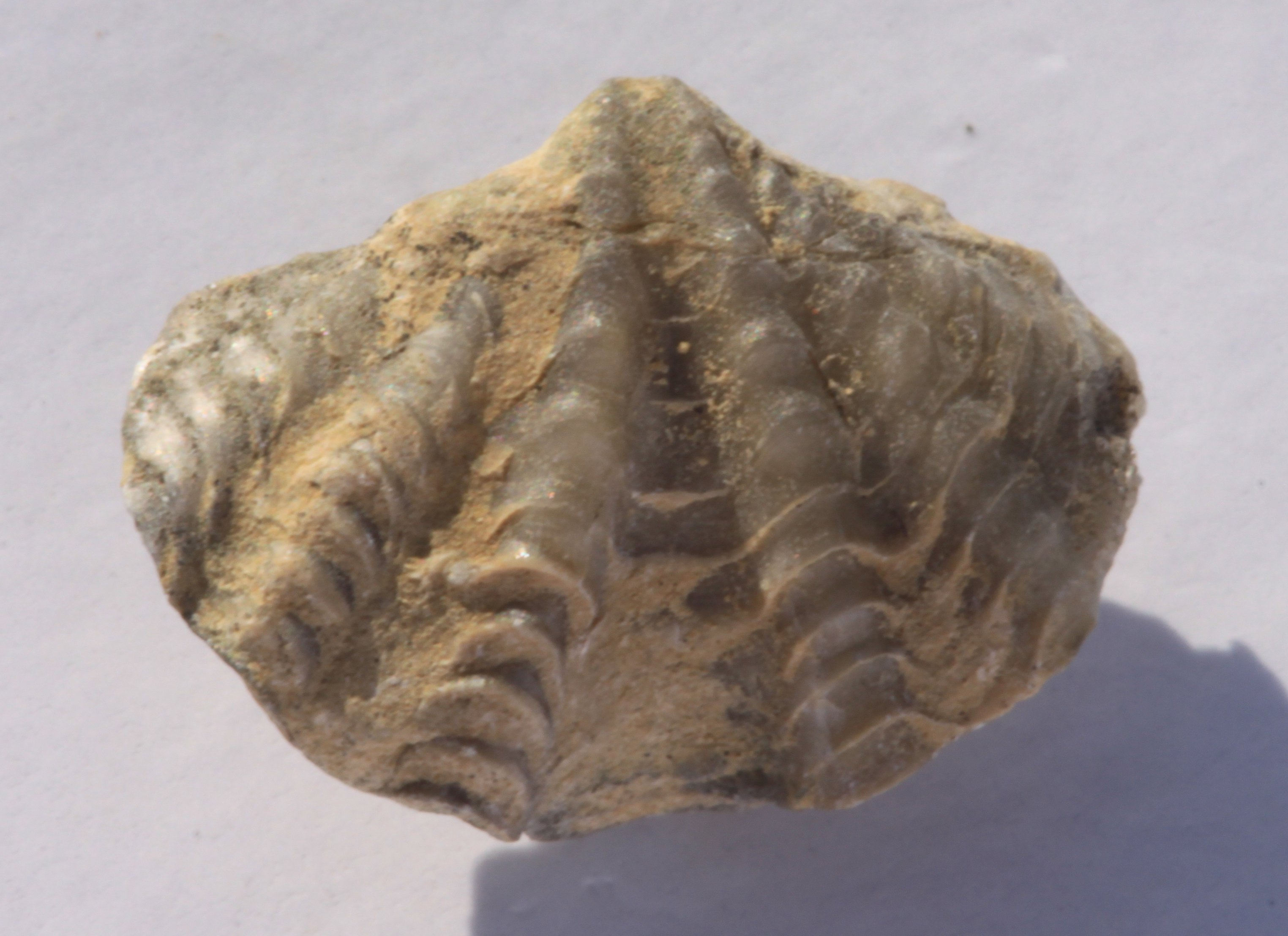
- Fossilized shell of the Late Ordovician-Late Triassic brachiopod Spirifer
  †Spirifer
  - †Spirifer grimesi
- †Stictoporella
- †Stigmaria
  - †Stigmaria ficoides
- †Streblopteria
  - †Streblopteria cooperensi
- †Streptelasm
- †Streptelasma
  - †Streptelasma produndum
- †Strictoporella
- †Stromatocerium
  - †Stromatocerium pustolosum
  - †Stromatocerium pustulosum
  - †Stromatocerium rugosum
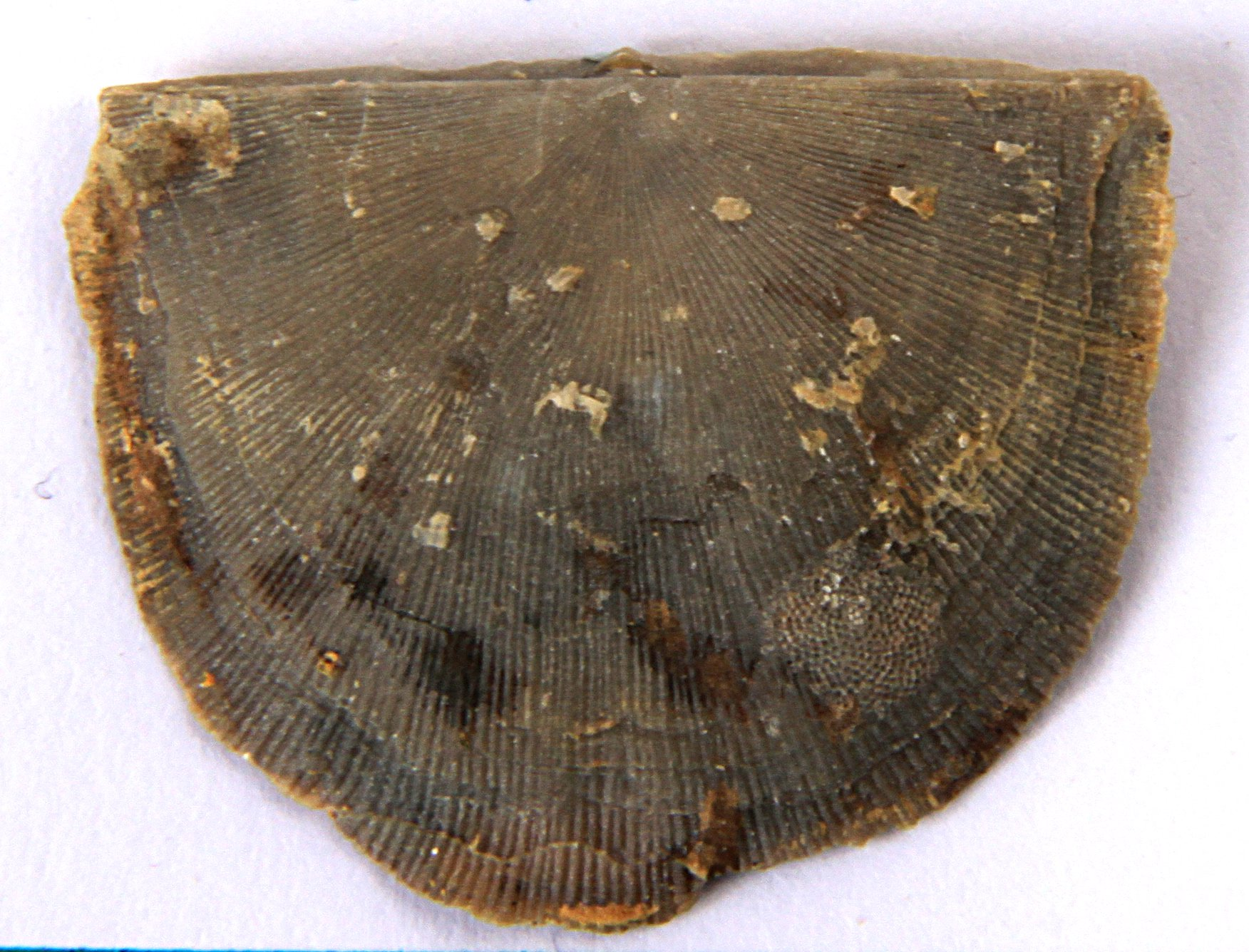
- Fossilized shell of the Ordovician-Silurian brachiopod Strophomena
  †Strophomena
  - †Strophomena incurvata
  - †Strophomena planumbona
- †Subulites
  - †Subulites subelongatus – or unidentified related form

== T ==
- †Tetradium
  - †Tetradium cellulosum
  - †Tetradium columnare
  - †Tetradium syringoporoides
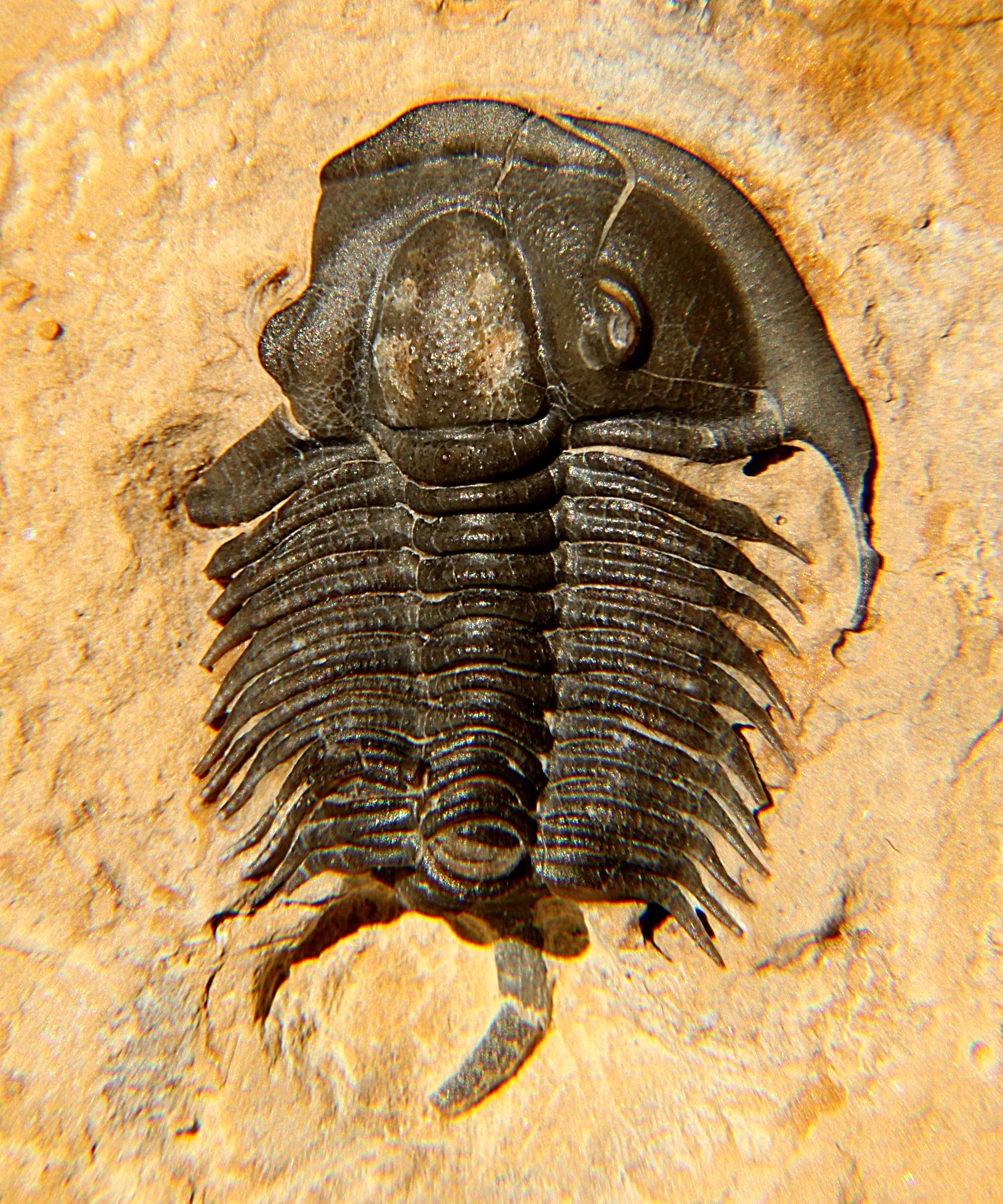
- Fossil of the Cambrian trilobite Tricrepicephalus
  †Tricrepicephalus
  - †Tricrepicephalus cedarensis
- †Triplophylum
  - †Triplophylum compressus
  - †Triplophylum dalei

== V ==
- †Valcourea
- †Valcouroceras

== Z ==
- †Zaphrenthis
  - †Zaphrenthis radicosa
- †Zeilleria
  - †Zeilleria delicatula
- †Zygospira
  - †Zygospira modesta
  - †Zygospira recurivirostris
