= Cauloramphus disjunctus =

Scientific classification
- Kingdom: Animalia
- Phylum: Bryozoa
- Class: Gymnolaemata
- Order: Cheilostomatida
- Family: Calloporidae
- Genus: Cauloramphus
- Species: C. disjunctus

Binomial name
- Cauloramphus disjunctus Canu & Bassler, 1929

Species of moss animal

Cauloramphus disjunctus is a species of small colonial bryozoan found encrusting rocks in shallow parts of the sea near Japan. Fossils of this species have been found that date back a million years.

== Description ==
Colonies of Cauloramphus disjunctus encrust rocks and grow to a diameter of about 1 cm (0.4 in). Each colony consists of a number of interlinked polyps with each individual reaching a length of about 0.5 mm (0.02 in). The epidermis secretes a hard exoskeleton which protects and supports the trunks of the polyps and the whole colony resembles an encrusting lichen. Each polyp has a lophophore, a feeding organ with tentacles, which is extended to feed but can be everted and drawn back inside the trunk. Each polyp is surrounded by a ring of protective spines which resemble eyelashes. The specific name "disjunctus" refers to the fact that the polyps are widely spaced but joined to neighbouring polyps through tubular channels, an unusual feature for this group of bryozoans.

== Distribution and habitat ==
Cauloramphus disjunctus is found in the seas off the north east coast of Honshu, Japan, from Kushiro southwards to Sendai. It also occurs off the west coast of Honshu and Hokkaido in the Sea of Japan. It is a little-studied species and grows as dwarf mats on the underside of pebbles. There is a quarry at Kuromatsunai on Hokkaido which is a rich source of well-preserved bryozoan fossils, including this species, dating back to the Pleistocene.

== Biology ==
Cauloramphus disjunctus is a filter feeder, extending its lophophore to catch phytoplankton. These are drawn into the mouth by the creation of a current of water and trapped by the tentacles.

Most bryozoans are hermaphrodites and produce large, yolky eggs. The embryos of Cauloramphus disjunctus are brooded in individual chambers surrounding the polyps and are liberated into the sea when mature. These larvae settle on the seabed within a few hours to found new colonies.

== Evolution ==
Bryozoans similar to Cauloramphus disjunctus have been found dating back 100 million years. At that time short, widely spaced spines had already evolved to protect the feeding polyps from predators. Since then, the spines have gradually become more numerous and angled inwards and now present an effective grid through which most predators cannot penetrate but which still allow the polyps to feed. Another defensive mechanism that has developed over the years is avicularia, non-feeding polyps with jaws that can fight back against predators. Both the avicularia and the spines are believed to be modified polyps. As this is a colonial species, the avicularia receive their nourishment from neighbouring feeding polyps. Fossils of this species one million years old are virtually identical to those animals that live today. Some of these million year old fossils have been found with intact spines and avicularia.
