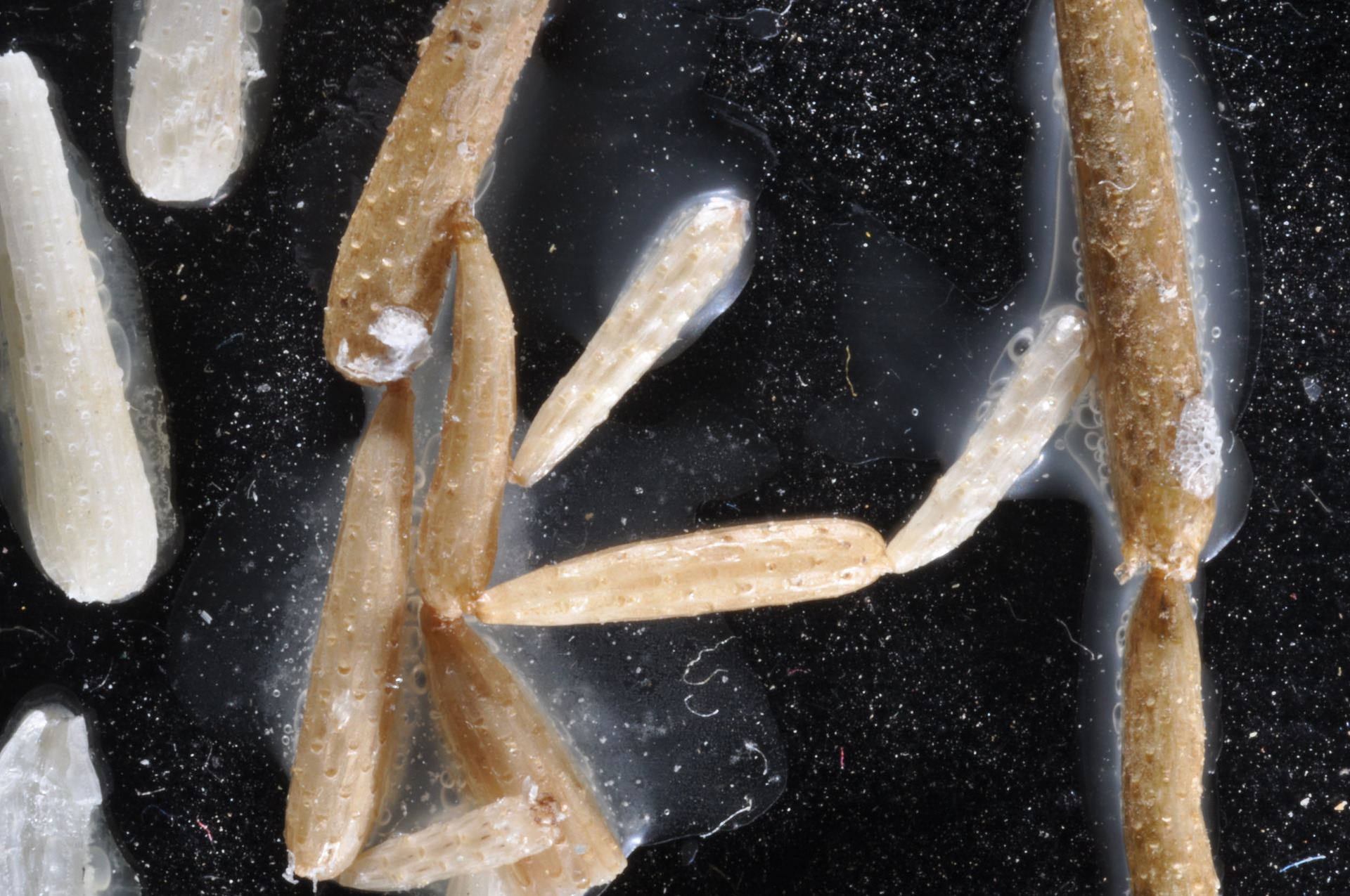

Scientific classification
- Kingdom: Animalia
- Phylum: Bryozoa
- Class: Gymnolaemata
- Order: Cheilostomatida
- Family: Microporidae
- Genus: Microporina; Levinsen, 1909

= Microporina =

Genus of bryozoans

Microporina is a genus of bryozoans belonging to the family Microporidae.

The genus has an almost cosmopolitan distribution.

== Species ==
The following species are recognised in the genus Microporina:

- Microporina articulata (Fabricius, 1821)
- †Microporina biswasi Guha & Gopikrishna, 2005
- Microporina elongata (Hincks, 1880)
- Microporina ivanovi Gontar, 1993
- Microporina japonica Canu & Bassler, 1929
- †Microporina magnipora (Canu, 1914)
- †Microporina minuta Arakawa, 2023
- Microporina okadai Silén, 1941
- †Microporina quadristoma Arakawa, 2023
- †Microporina sakakurai Arakawa, 2023
- †Microporina soebetsuensis Arakawa, 2023
