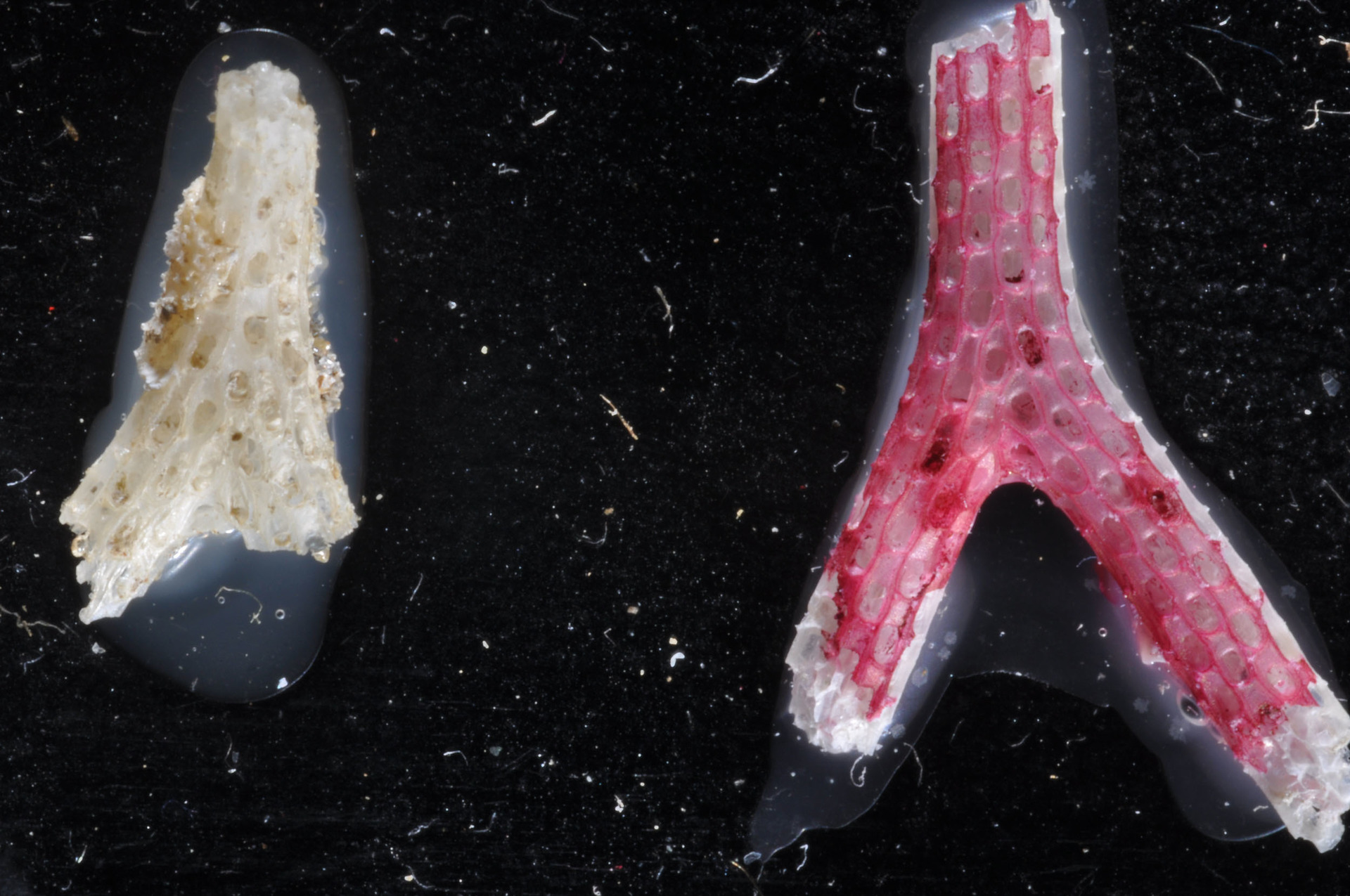
- Hemiseptella sp.

Scientific classification
- Kingdom: Animalia
- Phylum: Bryozoa
- Class: Gymnolaemata
- Order: Cheilostomatida
- Family: Calloporidae
- Genus: Hemiseptella; Levinsen, 1909

= Hemiseptella =

Genus of bryozoans

Hemiseptella is a genus of bryozoans belonging to the family Calloporidae.

The species of this genus are found in South America.

== Species ==
The following species are recognised in the genus Hemiseptella:

- Hemiseptella africana Canu & Bassler, 1930
- †Hemiseptella filimargo Canu & Bassler, 1923
- †Hemiseptella fistula (Ulrich & Bassler, 1904)
- †Hemiseptella fragilis Duvergier, 1921
- †Hemiseptella granulosa Canu & Bassler, 1923
- Hemiseptella labiata (Busk, 1884)
- †Hemiseptella lacinia (Tuomey & Holmes, 1857)
- †Hemiseptella lata Canu & Bassler, 1922
- †Hemiseptella ogivaliformis Vigneaux, 1949
- †Hemiseptella planulata Canu & Bassler, 1923
- †Hemiseptella rectangulata Canu & Bassler, 1923
- †Hemiseptella saucatsensis Vigneaux, 1949
- †Hemiseptella tuberosa Canu & Bassler, 1923
