= Cauloramphus =

Scientific classification
- Kingdom: Animalia
- Phylum: Bryozoa
- Class: Gymnolaemata
- Order: Cheilostomatida
- Family: Calloporidae
- Genus: Cauloramphus; Norman, 1903

Genus of bryozoans

Cauloramphus is a genus of bryozoans belonging to the family Calloporidae.

The species of this genus are found in Northern Hemisphere.

== Species ==
The following species are recognised in the genus Cauloramphus:

- Cauloramphus amphidisjunctus Dick, Mawatari, Sanner & Grischenko, 2011
- Cauloramphus ascofer Dick, Mawatari, Sanner & Grischenko, 2011
- Cauloramphus brunea Canu & Bassler, 1930
- Cauloramphus californiensis Soule, Soule & Chaney, 1995
- Cauloramphus cheliferoides Dick, Mawatari, Sanner & Grischenko, 2011
- Cauloramphus costatus Silén, 1941
- Cauloramphus cryptoarmatus Grischenko, Dick & Mawatari, 2007
- Cauloramphus cymbaeformis (Hincks, 1877)
- Cauloramphus dicki Min, Seo, Grischenko & Gordon, 2017
- Cauloramphus disjunctus Canu & Bassler, 1929
- Cauloramphus echinus (Hincks, 1882)
- Cauloramphus gracilis Dick, Mawatari, Sanner & Grischenko, 2011
- Cauloramphus infensus Dick, Mawatari, Sanner & Grischenko, 2011
- Cauloramphus intermedius Kluge, 1962
- Cauloramphus japonicus Silén, 1941
- Cauloramphus korensis Seo, 2001
- Cauloramphus magnus Dick & Ross, 1988
- Cauloramphus multiavicularia Dick, Grischenko & Mawatari, 2005
- Cauloramphus multispinosus Grischenko, Dick & Mawatari, 2007
- Cauloramphus neospiniferum Winston & Hayward, 2012
- Cauloramphus niger Grischenko, Dick & Mawatari, 2007
- Cauloramphus opertus Canu & Bassler, 1928
- Cauloramphus ordinarius Dick, Mawatari, Sanner & Grischenko, 2011
- Cauloramphus oshurkovi Dick, Mawatari, Sanner & Grischenko, 2011
- Cauloramphus parvus Dick, Mawatari, Sanner & Grischenko, 2011
- Cauloramphus peltatus Dick, Mawatari, Sanner & Grischenko, 2011
- †Cauloramphus porosus Canu & Bassler, 1923
- Cauloramphus pseudospinifer Androsova, 1958
- †Cauloramphus salomacensis Duvergier, 1924
- Cauloramphus spectabilis Dick & Ross, 1988
- Cauloramphus spencerjonesae Min, Seo, Grischenko & Gordon, 2017
- Cauloramphus spinifer (Johnston, 1832)
- Cauloramphus symetrica Yang & Lu, 1981
- Cauloramphus tortilis Dick, Grischenko & Mawatari, 2005
- Cauloramphus variegatus (Hincks, 1881)
