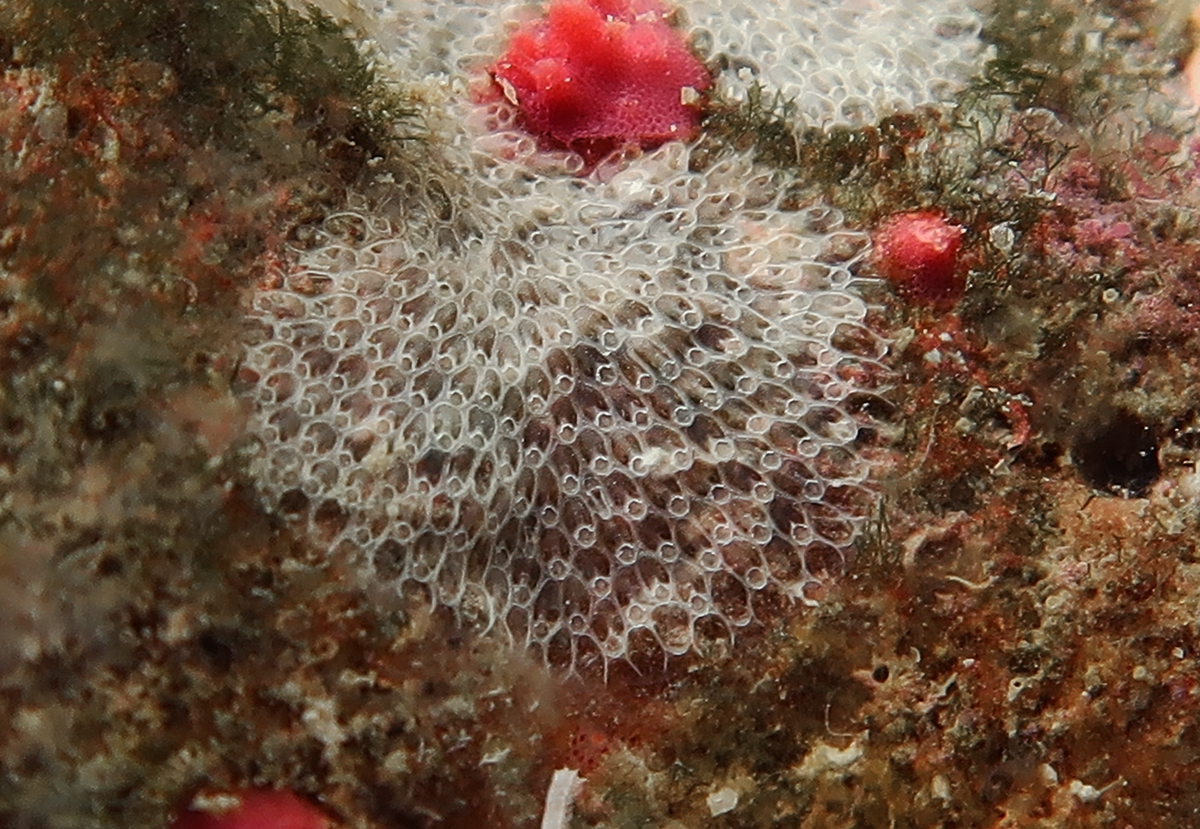

Scientific classification
- Kingdom: Animalia
- Phylum: Bryozoa
- Class: Gymnolaemata
- Order: Cheilostomatida
- Suborder: Flustrina
- Superfamily: Microporoidea
- Family: Microporidae; Gray, 1848

Synonyms
- Calpensiidae Canu & Bassler, 1923

= Microporidae =

Family of bryozoans

Microporidae is a family of bryozoans belonging to the order Cheilostomatida.

== Genera ==
The following genera are recognised:

- Andreella Jullien, 1888
- †Aviculiera Zágoršek, 2001
- Bryobifallax Rosso, Gerovasileiou & Di Martino, 2020
- Calpensia Jullien, 1888
- †Cianotremella Canu, 1911
- Coronellina Prenant & Bobin, 1966
- †Dimorphomicropora Ducasse & Vigneaux, 1960
- †Dimorphostylus Voigt, 1925
- Escharipora d'Orbigny, 1852
- Flustrapora Moyano, 1970
- †Gargantua Jullien, 1888
- †Manzonella Jullien, 1888
- Metamicropora Arakawa, 2016
- Micropora Gray, 1848
- Microporina Levinsen, 1909
- Mollia Lamouroux, 1816
- †Monsella Canu, 1900
- †Nematoporella Canu & Bassler, 1927
- Opaeophora Brown, 1948
- Otomicropora Gordon, 2014
- †Platelinella Taylor & Villier, 2022
- †Poropeltarion Cheetham, 1963
- Promicroa d'Hondt & Gordon, 1999
- †Puncturiella Levinsen, 1925
- †Puncturiellina Voigt, 1987
- Rectimicropora Hayward & Winston, 2011
- †Rimosocella Cheetham, 1960
- Rosemariella Gordon, 2014
- Scriblitopora Hayward & Winston, 2011
- Steraechmella Lagaaij, 1952
- †Verminaria Jullien, 1888
