= Calloporidae =

Scientific classification
- Kingdom: Animalia
- Phylum: Bryozoa
- Class: Gymnolaemata
- Order: Cheilostomatida
- Suborder: Flustrina
- Superfamily: Calloporoidea
- Family: Calloporidae; Norman, 1903

Family of bryozoans

Calloporidae is a family of bryozoans belonging to the order Cheilostomatida. Like other Bryozoans, most members live in marine and brackish water environments and tend to encrust on hard abiotic and biotic surfaces. This family include over 100 different genera, including renown taxa Callapora lineata.

== Description ==
Members of family share a lot of the distinct characters shown in other members of Bryozoa, including the presence of internal cavities that resemble a coelomic cavity Like other members in the phylum, Calloporidae all live in colonies of individuals referred to as zoids. Pores connecting individuals in colonies are important for zoid communication and reproduction. They possess extensive calcification under epithelial cell layers within the frontal wall of individual zoid organisms within colonies with the addition of spines in many species like the distal set of spines seen in the species Callopora horrida. Spines and calcareous tissue may serve the purpose of protecting the organism. Differentiation is seen between different zooid types; with feeding zooids, autozooids, seen to be present in most taxa.

== Phylogeny ==
Genomic sequencing indicates many phylogenetic relationships of Calloporidae with other members of the Cheilostomata family. The closest relationships on the family level were seen with Bugula, Micropora, Exochella, etc. However, there was a lower degree of molecular evidence for a monophyletic relationship between these families, given a variable level of understanding of morphology between different species.

== Reproduction ==
Like many others within Cheilostomata, the members of Calloporidae engage in internal brooding. This occurs within an internal brooding sac that originates from autozooid tissues. This tissue specifically being derived from autozooid tissue that the maternal zooid engulfs. Calloporidae, like other Bryozoans, engage in hermaphroditic reproduction in which fertilisation happens within the brooding cavity rather than broadcast spawning in the vast majority of species. Although these similarities with other Bryozoans exist, Calloporidae reproduction is unique in the development of the ovicell which typically houses zooid embryo and consists of the hyperstomial, or reproductive zooid.

Additionally, ovicells have gone through many reduction stages in development. Ovicells are a globular chamber that serves to incubate embryos in a durable skeletal like calcified structure. This has been shown in many genera in which the ovicells themselves dip below the colony surface and increased amounts of calcification on the outer distal walls of the oocelium. This was seen to be correlated with the further production of brooding sac tissue in favor of reducing oocelium development. Ovicell calcification allows for cavity pore passage communication between mother and daughter zooids. Calloporidae also show an increased propensity for internal brooding and increased investment in formation of a brooding chamber along the cavity floor.

== Fossil record/evolution ==
Calloporidae have a pretty extensive fossil record which is highlighted to the greatest degree in the western Kachchh, Gujurat, India Cenozoic assemblage. The finds form this basin show Bryozoan, and Calloporidae diversification of the early eocene epoch/ Autozooids showed similar methods of encrusting on rock formations and bivalve shells in the case of R. chhasraensis. However, major differences were identified in a variety of characters including the lack of cryptocysts, different avicularium placement, and ovicell pores missing from body cavities. Monophyly was seen in all Calloporid individuals within this formation.

Later Cenozoic evolutionary developments were seen in the Pleistocene deposit of Vaga Island off the Antarctic peninsula. These deposits along the volcanic rock coasts of Cape Lamb were dated to the later Neogene period and include some low biodiversity but high levels of evidence of colony interaction within the Bryozoa fossil record. Specimens were found within several different water column levels and shows rates of increased colonization among different medium water depths. The reason for higher degrees of fossilization for Calloporidae can be attributed to the higher degree of colonization among modern Bryozoan distribution in inlet brackish waters. These estuaries and lakes are often times connected to the ocean and allow for higher sedimentation levels. Most members of the Calloporidae family possess calcareous frontal walls and calcification of ovicell tissue. These calcified chambers and encrusting behavior allow for better sediment impressions and a higher yield of fossilization.

== Genera ==
The following genera are recognised in the family Calloporidae:

- †Acanthoporella Davis, 1934
- †Acanthoporidra Davis, 1934
- Adenifera Canu & Bassler, 1917
- Alderina Norman, 1903
- Allantocallopora d'Hondt & Schopf, 1985
- Allantopora Lang, 1914
- Ammatophora Norman, 1903
- †Ammatophoroides Di Martino, Rosso & Taylor, 2025
- Amphiblestrum Gray, 1848
- Apiophragma Hayward & Ryland, 1993
- Aplousina Canu & Bassler, 1927
- Barrosia Souto, Reverter-Gil & Fernández-Pulpeiro, 2010
- Bathyanasca López Gappa & Liuzzi, 2024
- †Berthelsenia Voigt, 1989
- †Biaviculigera Voigt, 1989
- Bidenkapia Osburn, 1950
- †Bonellina Schmidt, 2007
- †Bryobrownius Gordon & Taylor, 2017
- Bryocalyx Cook & Bock, 2000
- Callopora Gray, 1848
- Cauloramphus Norman, 1903
- Cavalliella Gordon, 2014
- Clavodesia Harmelin & d'Hondt, 1992
- Concertina Gordon, 1986
- Copidozoum Harmer, 1926
- Corbulella Gordon, 1984
- Cranosina Canu & Bassler, 1933
- †Crassicellepora Berthelsen, 1962
- Crassimarginatella Canu, 1900
- †Dermatopora von Hagenow, 1851
- †Dionella Medd, 1965
- †Distelopora Lang, 1915
- †Filiflustrina d'Orbigny, 1853
- Flustrellaria d'Orbigny, 1853
- †Foratella Canu, 1900
- †Gabbhornia Martha, Sanner, Cheetham & Scholz, 2025
- †Gilbertopora Ostrovsky & Taylor, 2004
- †Glenelgia Brown, 1958
- †Hapsidopora Lang, 1917
- Hemiseptella Levinsen, 1909
- †Hillmeropora Martha, Niebuhr & Scholz, 2016
- Judyella Gordon, 2021
- †Kristerina Taylor & McKinney, 2006
- †Kunradocella Voigt & Hillmer, 1996
- Leptinatella Cook & Bock, 2000
- †Marginaria Römer, 1841
- Marssonopora Lang, 1914
- Megapora Hincks, 1877
- Membraniporidra Canu & Bassler, 1917
- †Mystriopora Lang, 1915
- Niwapora Gordon, 2021
- †Obsitacella Martha, Sanner, Cheetham & Scholz, 2025
- †Ogivalina Canu & Bassler, 1917
- Olisthella Gordon & Taylor, 2017
- Onychoblestrum Gordon, 1984
- †Ornatella Canu, 1900
- †Pachybaktropora Voigt, 1999
- †Paraflustrella Håkansson, Gordon & Taylor, 2024
- †Paramphiblestrum Håkansson, Gordon & Taylor, 2024
- Parellisina Osburn, 1940
- †Periporosella Canu & Bassler, 1917
- †Pithodella Marsson, 1887
- †Planicellaria d'Orbigny, 1851
- Platypyxis De Blauwe & Gordon, 2014
- †Pseudoallantopora Taylor & McKinney, 2006
- Punctocellaria Guha & Nathan, 1996
- †Pyriflustrina d'Orbigny, 1853
- †Pyriporella Canu, 1911
- Pyriporoides Hayward & Thorpe, 1989
- Quasicallopora Gordon, 2021
- Quitocallopora Gordon, 2021
- Ramphonotus Norman, 1894
- Recapitulator Gordon, 2014
- †Reptoflustrella d'Orbigny, 1853
- †Reptoporina d'Orbigny, 1852
- †Semiflustrella d'Orbigny, 1853
- †Semiflustrina d'Orbigny, 1853
- Septentriopora Kukliński & Taylor, 2006
- †Solenophragma Marsson, 1887
- †Stamenocella Canu & Bassler, 1917
- Tegella Levinsen, 1909
- †Tremogasterina Canu, 1911
- †Treptopora Voigt, 1967
- †Tumaiella Gordon & Taylor, 2015
- †Tylopora Lang, 1917
- †Unidistelopora Ostrovsky & Taylor, 2004
- Valdemunitella Canu, 1900
- †Wilbertopora Cheetham, 1954
- Xylochotridens Hayward & Thorpe, 1989
