= Callopora lineata =

Scientific classification
- Kingdom: Animalia
- Phylum: Bryozoa
- Class: Gymnolaemata
- Order: Cheilostomatida
- Family: Calloporidae
- Genus: Callopora
- Species: C. lineata

Binomial name
- Callopora lineata (Linnaeus, 1767)

Synonyms
- Eschara sedecimdentata Moll, 1803; Flustra lineata Linnaeus, 1758

Species of bryozoan

Callopora lineata is a species of colonial bryozoan in the family Calloporidae. It is found on rocky shores in the Atlantic Ocean and the Mediterranean Sea.

== Taxonomy ==
This species was first described in 1758 by the Swedish naturalist Carl Linnaeus. He gave it the name Flustra lineata, but it was later transferred to the genus Callopora, becoming Callopora lineata. It is the type species of the genus.

== Description ==
Colonies of Callopora lineata form small white patches on fronds of Laminaria, often in association with several species of Ascophora. The frontal ends of the feeding zooids are partially calcified, and the front margin is surrounded by finger-like spiny processes. The developing embryos are brooded in ovicells (specialised chambers), which may appear pinkish.

== Ecology ==
Bryozoans feed on phytoplankton, including diatoms and other unicellular algae, which they trap with the crown of tentacles forming the lophophore. This can be retracted into the zooid and the opening closed with an operculum. The nutrients obtained by the feeding zooids are shared with the specialised, non-feeding zooids involved in reproduction.

In the Isle of Man, Callopora lineata was found to be a short-lived species, with colonies recruiting at any time of year and only surviving for a few months. In the Mediterranean Sea, C. lineata is the dominant species of bryozoan growing on Neptune grass in the deeper parts of the seagrass meadows, at depths below about 15 m (50 ft). In the shallower parts, Electra posidoniae is dominant. C. lineata is rare in November, and recruitment seems to take place mostly in February and March. By July, colonies are well established, often consisting of more than 100 zooids.
