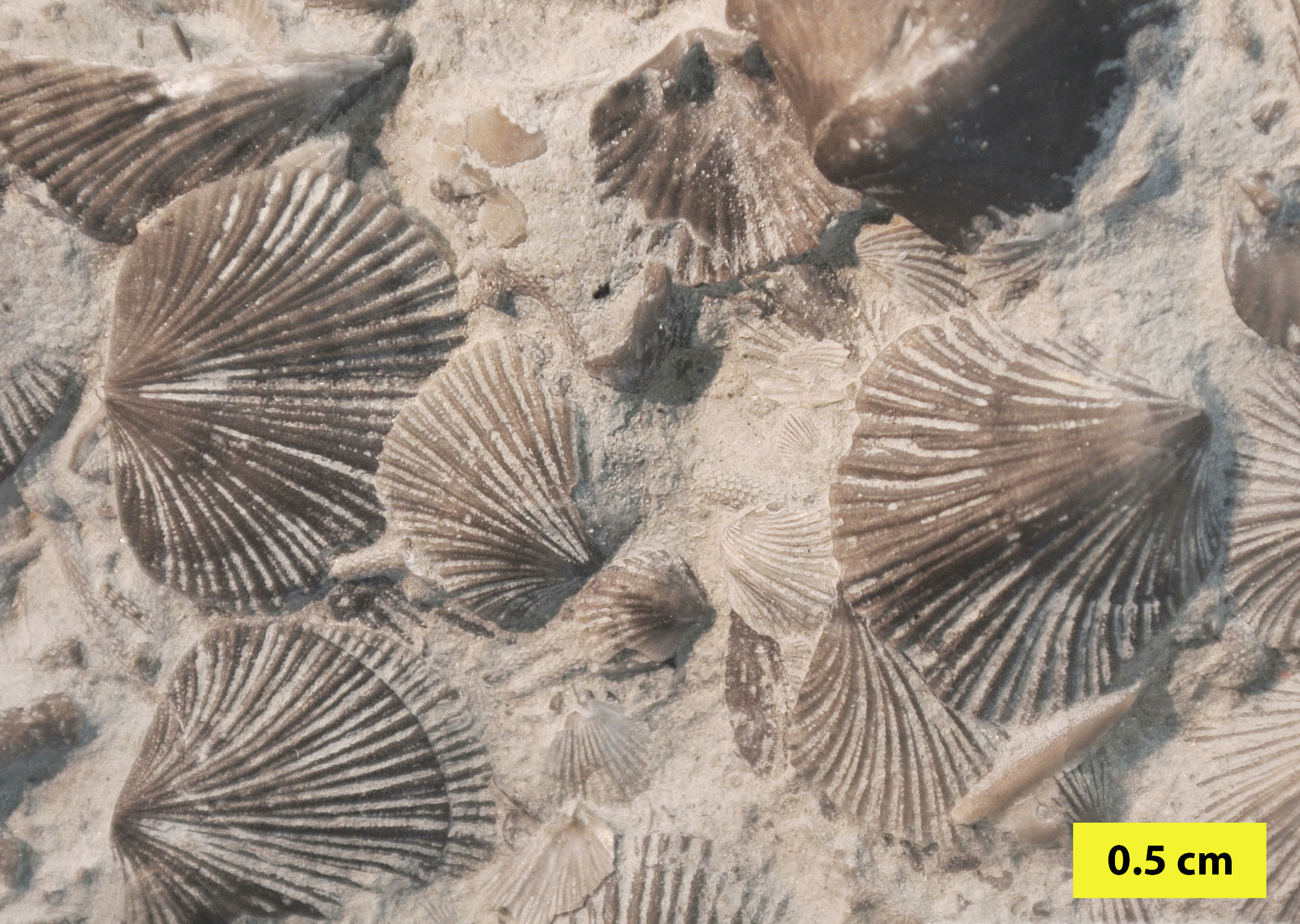
- Cincinnetina meeki (Miller, 1875) (Upper Ordovician of Ohio).

Scientific classification
- Kingdom: Animalia
- Phylum: Brachiopoda
- Class: Rhynchonellata
- Order: †Orthida
- Family: †Dalmanellidae
- Genus: †Cincinnetina; Jin, 2012

= Cincinnetina =

Cincinnetina Temporal range: Late Ordovician

Genus of fossil brachiopods

Cincinnetina is an extinct genus of brachiopods which existed in what is now the United States during the Late Ordovician. It was described by Jisuo Jin in 2012, as a new genus for the Orthis species O. multisecta (Meek, 1873) and O. meeki (Miller, 1875), each of which have been replaced a number of times under other genera, e.g. Dalmanella, Resserella, and Onniella by other authors. A third species, C. minnesotensis, was described from Minnesota, from which its species epithet was derived.

== Species ==
- Cincinnetina multisecta (Meek, 1873)
- Cincinnetina meeki (Miller, 1875)
- Cincinnetina minnesotensis Jin, 2012
