= Micropora =

Scientific classification
- Kingdom: Animalia
- Phylum: Bryozoa
- Class: Gymnolaemata
- Order: Cheilostomatida
- Family: Microporidae
- Genus: Micropora; Gray, 1848

Synonyms
- Peneclausa Jullien, 1888

Genus of moss animals

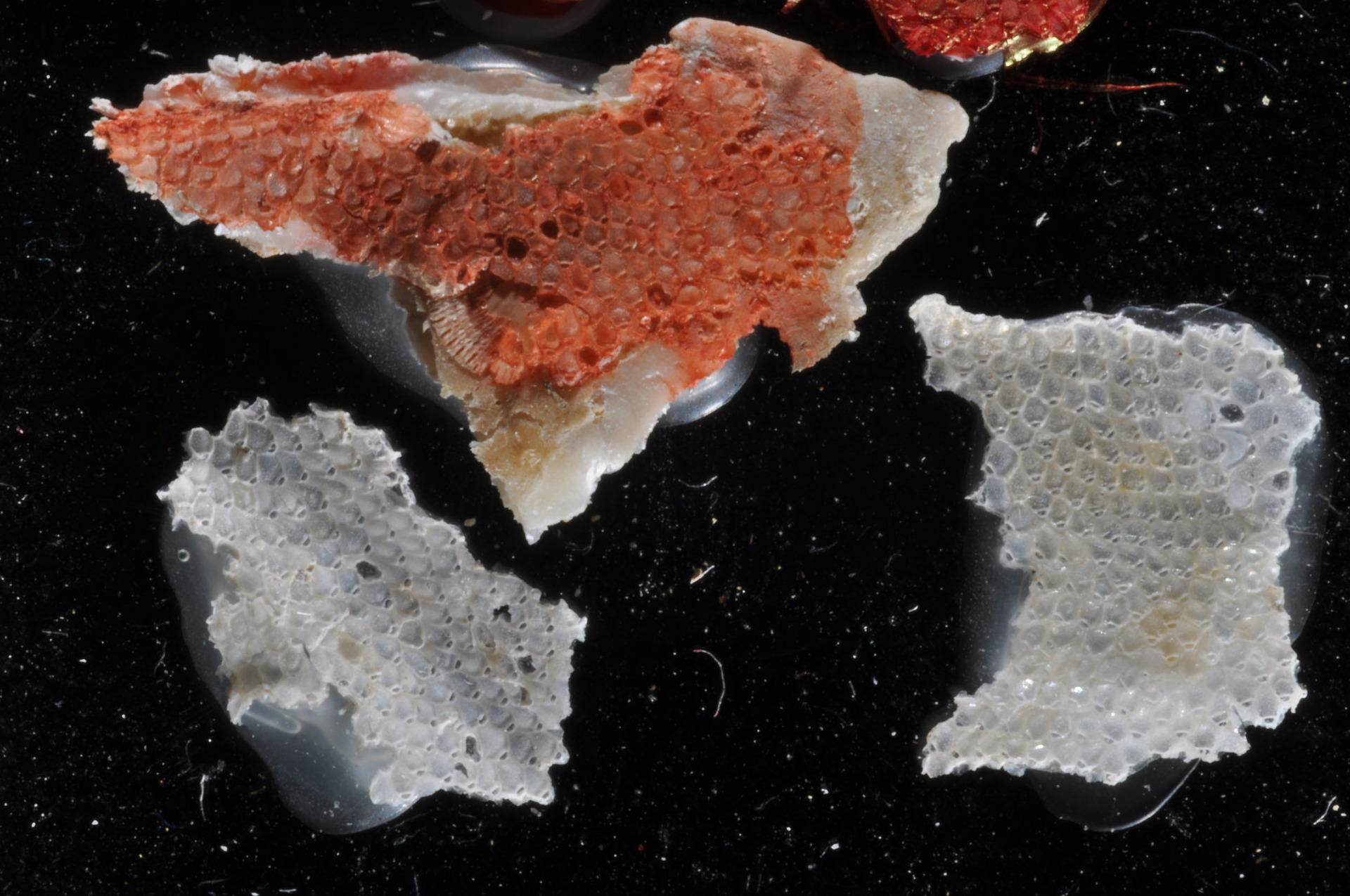
Micropora coriacea, found in Bamfield, British Columbia

Micropora is a genus of bryozoans in the family Microporidae. Colonies are always encrusting.

== Species ==
The following species are recognised in the genus Micropora:

- Micropora acorecia Berning & Wisshak, 2024
- Micropora acuminata Winston, 2005
- Micropora africana d'Orbigny, 1852
- Micropora amapaensis Ramalho & Moraes, 2021
- †Micropora amphora (von Hagenow, 1839)
- †Micropora angulata Levinsen, 1925
- Micropora angusta MacGillivray, 1887
- Micropora angustiscapulis Winston, Vieira & Woollacott, 2014
- †Micropora ansata (von Hagenow, 1839)
- Micropora aspinosa De Blauwe & Gordon, 2014
- †Micropora bengalensis Guha & Nathan, 1996
- †Micropora biforis (Marsson, 1887)
- Micropora biopesiula Pica & Berning, 2022
- Micropora brevissima Waters, 1904
- Micropora cervicornis d'Hondt & Mascarell, 2010
- †Micropora chathamica Gordon & Taylor, 2015
- Micropora coriacea (Esper, 1791)
- Micropora coriacea (Johnston, 1847)
- †Micropora cribriformis Gregory, 1893
- Micropora elegans Maplestone, 1901
- Micropora equilateralis d'Hondt & Gordon, 1999
- †Micropora erecta Canu, 1910
- Micropora erecta Boonzaaier-Davids, Florence & Gibbons, 2020
- †Micropora erratica (Voigt, 1924)
- Micropora finisterrae Moyano, 1994
- Micropora fissurata Waters, 1927
- †Micropora gouetensis Balavoine, 1960
- Micropora gracilis (Uttley, 1949)
- †Micropora hennigiana Berthelsen, 1962
- †Micropora hexagona (Zagorsek, 1994)
- Micropora inexpectata Moyano, 2002
- Micropora karukinkaensis Moyano, 1994
- Micropora latiavicula Florence, Hayward & Gibbons, 2007
- †Micropora lozengia Ziko, Hamza & EI Safori, 1994
- †Micropora lunipuncta Maplestone, 1901
- Micropora mawatarii Arakawa, 2016
- †Micropora mikesmithi Taylor & Villier, 2022
- †Micropora minuticella Canu & Bassler, 1920
- Micropora mortenseni Livingstone, 1929
- †Micropora multicrescens Brydone, 1936
- Micropora nodimagna Ramalho & Calliari, 2015
- †Micropora nordenskjoeldi Hara, Mörs, Hagström & Reguero, 2018
- Micropora normani Levinsen, 1909
- Micropora notialis Hayward & Ryland, 1993
- †Micropora ogivalina Canu & Bassler, 1933
- †Micropora papyracea (Reuss, 1848)
- †Micropora parvicella Canu & Lecointre, 1927
- †Micropora perforata David, Mongereau & Pouyet, 1972
- Micropora plana Arakawa, 2016
- †Micropora pseudobiforis Voigt, 1962
- †Micropora quadriporosa Gordon & Taylor, 1999
- Micropora rimulata Canu & Bassler, 1929
- Micropora robusta Cook, 1985
- Micropora santacruzana Soule, Soule & Chaney, 1995
- Micropora selknami Moyano, 1994
- Micropora similis Hayward & Cook, 1983
- †Micropora speculum (Marsson, 1887)
- †Micropora stellata Di Martino, Taylor & Portell, 2019
- Micropora stenostoma (Busk, 1854)
- †Micropora stevensis Levinsen, 1925
- †Micropora transversa (d'Orbigny, 1851)
- †Micropora urceolus (Eichwald, 1865)
- †Micropora urhidensis Zagorsek, 2001
- Micropora variperforata Waters, 1887
- †Micropora vredenburgi Guha & Gopikrishna, 2005
