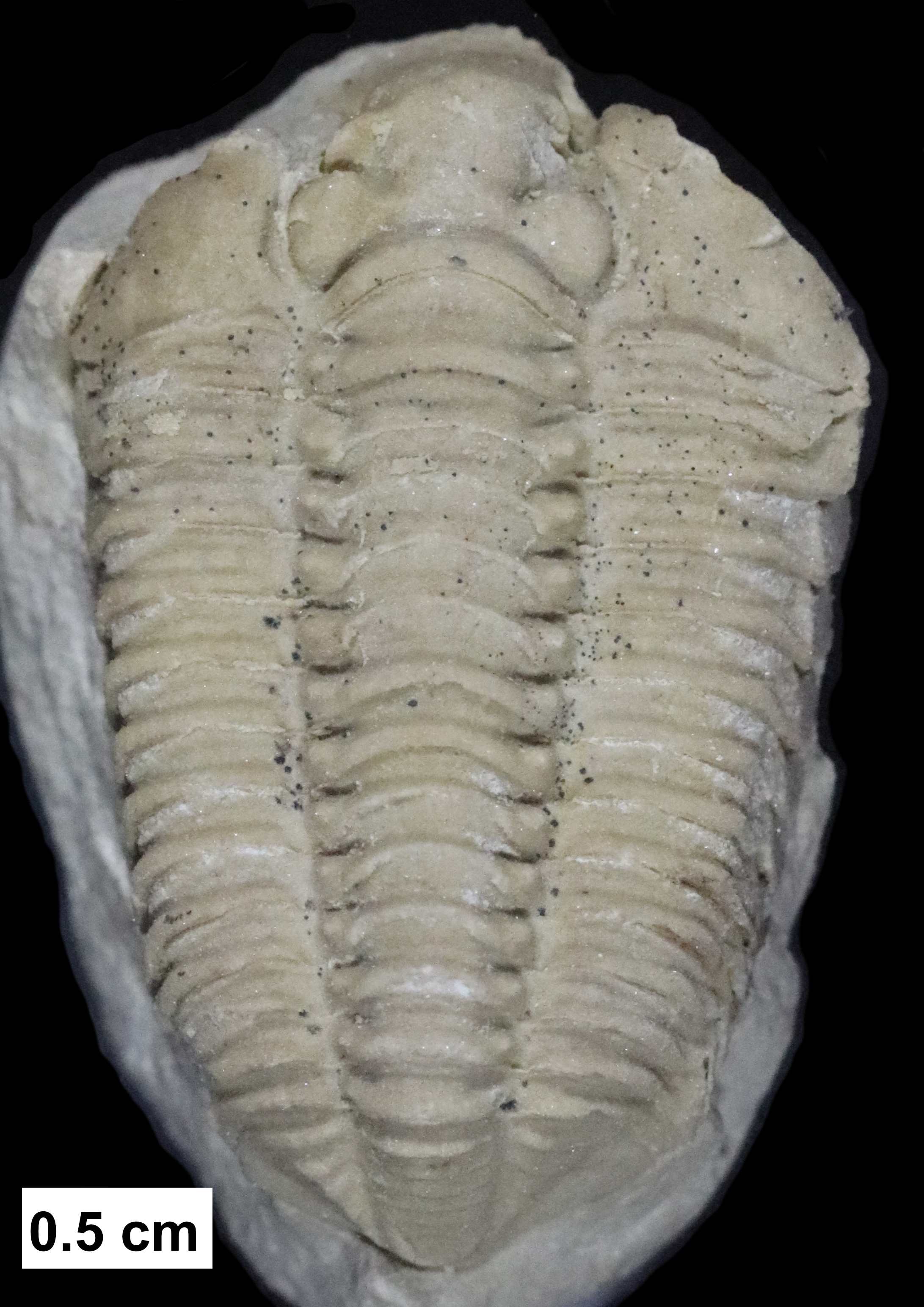

Scientific classification
- Domain: Eukaryota
- Kingdom: Animalia
- Phylum: Arthropoda
- Class: †Trilobita
- Order: †Phacopida
- Family: †Calymenidae
- Genus: †Calymene
- Species: †C. celebra

Binomial name
- †Calymene celebra Raymond, 1916

= Calymene celebra =

Calymene celebra Temporal range: Silurian

Silurian species of trilobites

Calymene celebra is a Silurian species of trilobites of the order Phacopida and also the state fossil of Wisconsin. It is found in Illinois, Indiana, and Wisconsin.
