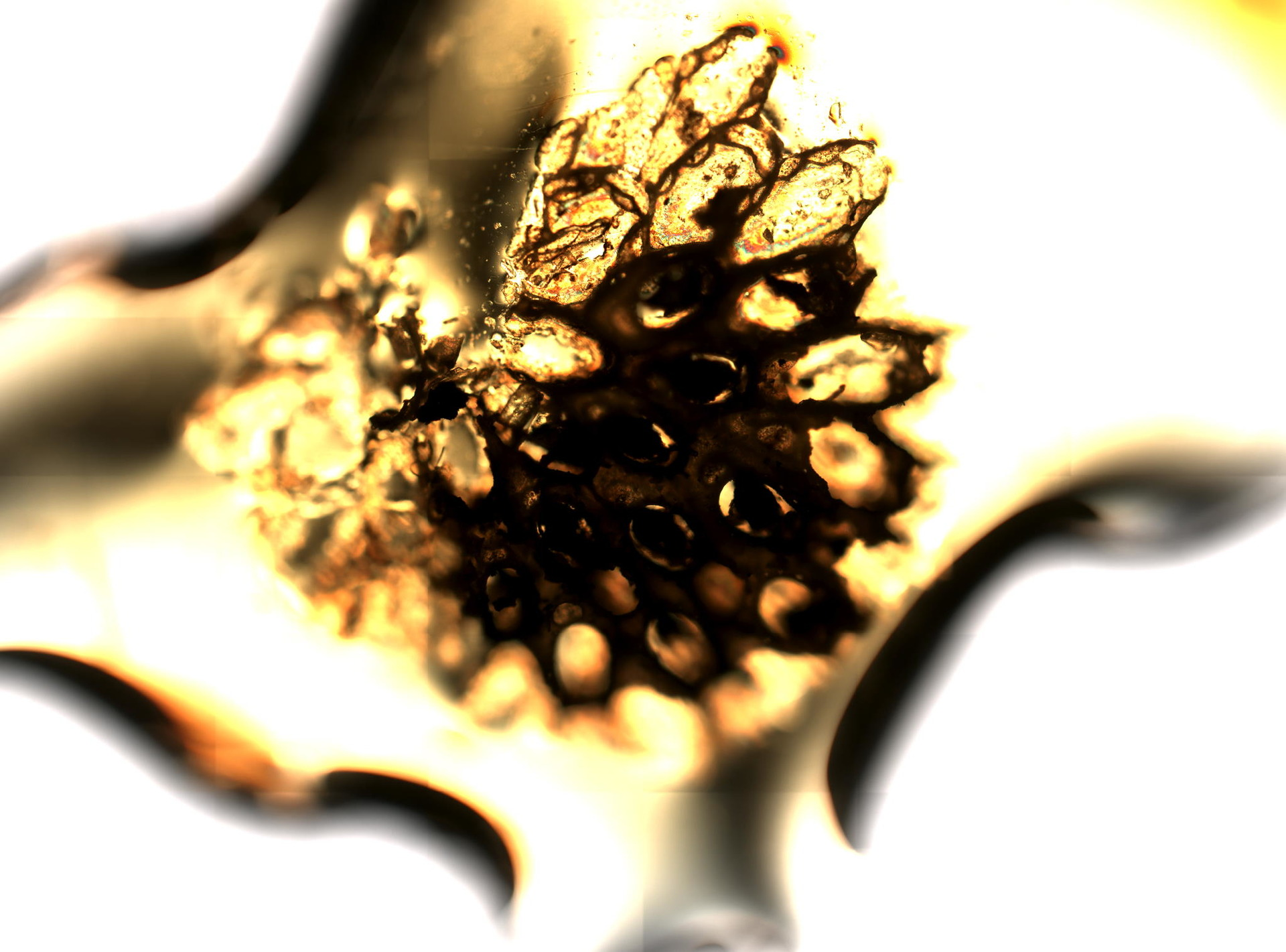
- Callopora craticula

Scientific classification
- Kingdom: Animalia
- Phylum: Bryozoa
- Class: Gymnolaemata
- Order: Cheilostomatida
- Family: Calloporidae
- Genus: Callopora; Gray, 1848

= Callopora =

Genus of bryozoans

Callopora is a genus of bryozoans belonging to the family Calloporidae.

The genus has a cosmopolitan distribution.

== Species ==
The following species are recognised in the genus Callopora.

- Callopora abyssalis Grischenko, Gordon & Melnik, 2024
- †Callopora acuminella Berthelsen, 1962
- Callopora armata O'Donoghue & O'Donoghue, 1926
- †Callopora asanoi Kataoka, 1961
- †Callopora aviculosa Voigt, 1930
- Callopora bathyalis Harmelin, 1975
- †Callopora biauriculata (Römer, 1863)
- †Callopora binkhorsti (Ubaghs, 1879)
- †Callopora bugei Labracherie, 1975
- †Callopora calceolus (Levinsen, 1925)
- Callopora canui Silén, 1941
- Callopora caudata Canu & Bassler, 1928
- †Callopora ciplyensis Voigt, 1957
- †Callopora circularis (d'Orbigny, 1852)
- Callopora confluens Cook, 1968
- †Callopora convexa Canu & Bassler, 1920
- †Callopora coralliformis (Brydone, 1910)
- Callopora corniculifera (Hincks, 1882)
- †Callopora crassospina Canu & Bassler, 1920
- Callopora craticula (Alder, 1856)
- †Callopora cucullata Canu & Bassler, 1920
- Callopora decidua Dick & Ross, 1988
- Callopora depressa Cook, 1968
- Callopora derjugini Kluge, 1955
- Callopora deseadensis Lopez Gappa, 1981
- †Callopora diluvii (Voigt, 1924)
- Callopora discreta (Hincks, 1862)
- Callopora dumerilii (Audouin, 1826)
- †Callopora exilis Vigneaux, 1949
- †Callopora filoparietis Canu & Bassler, 1920
- †Callopora flora (Brydone, 1916)
- Callopora floridana Winston, 2016
- †Callopora fortuna (Brydone, 1929)
- †Callopora hexapora (Reuss, 1854)
- †Callopora horniana Bassler, 1936
- Callopora horridoidea Androsova, 1958
- †Callopora ifoeensis Voigt, 1930
- Callopora inaviculata Seo & Min, 2009
- Callopora inconspicua (O'Donoghue & O'Donoghue, 1923)
- Callopora inermis Liu & Wass, 2000?
- †Callopora ingens Canu & Bassler, 1920
- †Callopora inornata (d'Orbigny, 1853)
- †Callopora invigilata (Brydone, 1910)
- Callopora jamesi O'Donoghue & de Watteville, 1944
- †Callopora jboehmi Voigt, 1924
- Callopora klugei Androsova, 1958
- Callopora lamellata Androsova, 1958
- †Callopora lanceolata Canu & Bassler, 1923
- †Callopora langi (Brydone, 1910)
- Callopora lata (Kluge, 1907)
- Callopora lineata (Linnaeus, 1767)
- Callopora longispinosa Androsova, 1958
- †Callopora lyra (von Hagenow, 1839)
- †Callopora lyraeformis Voigt, 1930
- †Callopora lyratopunctata Voigt, 1930
- Callopora macilenta (Jullien, 1882)
- †Callopora marginata (d'Orbigny, 1852)
- Callopora minuscula (Hincks, 1882)
- †Callopora missilis (Brydone, 1916)
- †Callopora monilifera (Maplestone, 1901)
- †Callopora monocera (Marsson, 1887)
- †Callopora montgomeryensis McGuirt, 1941
- †Callopora multipora (Gabb & Horn, 1862)
- †Callopora mundula Canu & Bassler, 1920
- Callopora nazcae Moyano, 1991
- Callopora nuda Kühn, 1930
- Callopora nuda Dick & Ross, 1988
- Callopora obesa Kluge, 1952
- †Callopora oculata (d'Orbigny, 1852)
- †Callopora pachyteichos Voigt, 1930
- Callopora panhoplites (Ortmann, 1890)
- †Callopora patelliformis Voigt, 1930
- †Callopora perisparsa (Novak, 1877)
- †Callopora polytaxis Voigt, 1930
- †Callopora pseudofortuna Voigt, 1962
- Callopora pumicosa Canu & Bassler, 1928
- †Callopora pyrigera (Brydone, 1912)
- †Callopora rosenkrantzi Berthelsen, 1962
- Callopora rylandi Bobin & Prenant, 1965
- Callopora sarae Grischenko, Dick & Mawatari, 2007
- Callopora sedovi Kluge, 1962
- Callopora septentrionalis Denisenko, 2016
- †Callopora seroniae Voigt, 1985
- Callopora sigillata (Pourtalès, 1867)
- †Callopora speciosa (Gabb & Horn, 1862)
- †Callopora stefniensis Berthelsen, 1962
- †Callopora stipata Canu & Bassler, 1920
- †Callopora subaurita El Hajjaji, 1992
- Callopora thaxterae Winston & Hayward, 2012
- †Callopora tuberosa Canu & Bassler, 1920
- †Callopora tuberosa (Novak, 1877)
- Callopora verrucosa Canu & Bassler, 1930
- †Callopora vesicularis (Beissel, 1865)
- †Callopora vicina Canu & Bassler, 1920
- Callopora weslawski Kuklinski & Taylor, 2006
