= Anna Birchall Hastings =

English bryozoologist (1902–1977)

- Born: 8 August 1902; Mile End Old Town, London, England
- Died: 15 May 1977 (aged 74); London, England
- Education: PhD
- Alma mater: Department of Zoology, University of Cambridge
- Spouse: Henry Dighton Thomas
- Scientific career
- Fields: Bryozoology
- Workplaces: British Museum
- Thesis: Cheilostomatous Polyzoa from the vicinity of the Panama Canal, collected by Dr C. Crossland on the cruise of the S.Y., 'St.George' / Anna Birchall Hastings (1929)

Anna Birchall Hastings (1902-1977) was an English bryozoologist who described and classified numerous species of bryozoans, including both freshwater and marine forms. Her work significantly contributed to the understanding of bryozoan taxonomy and evolution.

== Early life ==
Hastings was born on 8 August 1902 in Mile End Old Town, London, the daughter of Edwin Birchall Hastings (1860–1929) and his wife Therese (née Mundella) (1863–1943).

She studied at the University of Cambridge and in 1929 she was awarded a PhD in zoology for her thesis on "Cheilostomatous Polyzoa from the vicinity of the Panama Canal, collected by Dr C. Crossland on the cruise of the S.Y., 'St.George'".

== The British Museum ==
In 1927 she was appointed to a post in the Department of Zoology at the British Museum in London as the assistant to Sidney Frederic Harmer (1862–1950) who retired that year from the position of Director of the Museum. Bryozoans formed one of Harmer's specialities and in 1935 Hastings became an assistant keeper in the museum with full responsibility for the Recent bryozoans.

On 1 June 1941 she married Henry Dighton Thomas, a palaeontologist who was also employed at the British Museum. Because of the Civil Service marriage bar that was then in place for women in the UK she had to resign her position when she married, even though her new husband could remain in post. After her marriage she didn't change her work practices, continuing to work in an unpaid research capacity, as an Honorary Associate until 1961, and using her maiden name in professional circles after marrying.

During the War important parts of the bryozoa collection were evacuated to her house in Kew. One of the microscopes she used for her work at the British Museum is still kept in the institution.

== Research ==
One of her first major publications was on material collected from Panama area by Cyril Crossland during the cruise of 1924–1925. Hastings also worked on bryozoans from the 1928 Great Barrier Reef expedition and shortly before her marriage she completed a major monograph on the bryozoans from the Antarctic, collected during the Discovery expedition which involved the examination of over 2300 slides. She later worked on the bryozoa of the English Lake District. The British Museum records provide a more complete list of her publications.

She worked closely with Sir Sidney Frederic Harmer until his death in 1950, (she wrote his obituary for the Linnean Society) and it was "Harmer’s express desire" that Hastings should carry out the final editing of the fourth part of the report on bryozoa from the Dutch Siboga oceanographic expedition around the islands of Indonesia.

Through her research she engaged and corresponded with a number of eminent zoologists including D'Arcy Wentworth Thompson, Amy Elizabeth “Betty” Blagg, and Ray S. Bassler, with whom she developed a close friendship, which lasted over 30 years, exchanging family news and personal photographs, until Basler's death in 1961.

== Personal life ==
On 1 June 1941 she married Henry Dighton Thomas, a palaeontologist who was also employed at the British Museum. A son, James Dighton Thomas was born on 3 September 1942.

Hastings died on 15 May 1977.

== Taxa named by Hastings ==
Taxa named by A.B. Hastings include:

- Amastigia harmeri Hastings, 1943
- Amastigia vibraculifera Hastings, 1943
- Beania challengeri Hastings, 1943
- Beania inermis unicornis Hastings, 1943
- Beania livingstonei Hastings, 1943
- Beania scotti Hastings, 1943
- Brettiopsis triplex Hastings, 1943
- Bugula crosslandi Hastings, 1939
- Bugula cuspidata Hastings, 1943: synonym of Crisularia cuspidata (Hastings, 1943)
- Bugula expansa Hastings, 1939
- Bugula neritinoides Hastings, 1939
- Caberea angusta Hastings, 1943
- Caberea darwinii guntheri Hastings, 1943
- Caberea darwinii occlusa Hastings, 1943
- Caberea helicina Hastings, 1943
- Camptoplites asymmetricus Hastings, 1943
- Camptoplites atlanticus Hastings, 1943
- Camptoplites bicornis quadravicularis Hastings, 1943
- Camptoplites latus asperus Hastings, 1943
- Camptoplites latus striatus Hastings, 1943
- Camptoplites rectilinearis Hastings, 1943
- Camptoplites tenuispinus Hastings, 1943
- Caulibugula tuberosa Hastings, 1939
- Cellaria bassleri Hastings, 1947
- Cellaria scoresbyi Hastings, 1947
- Cellaria squamosa Hastings, 1947
- Cigclisula cautium Hastings, 1932
- Cornucopina ovalis Hastings, 1943
- Cornucopina ovalis versa Hastings, 1943
- Cornucopina zelandica Hastings, 1943
- Didemnum magnetae Hastings, 1931
- Ellisina antarctica Hastings, 1945
- Emma rotunda Hastings, 1939
- Emma triangula Hastings, 1939
- Emma watersi Hastings, 1939
- Erymophora Hastings, 1943: synonym of Bugulella Verrill, 1879
- Farciminellum antarcticum Hastings, 1943: synonym of Klugeflustra antarctica (Hastings, 1943)
- Himantozoum (Himantozoum) obtusum Hastings, 1943
- Himantozoum obtusum Hastings, 1943: synonym of Himantozoum (Himantozoum) obtusum Hastings, 1943
- Hippoporella gorgonensis Hastings, 1930: synonym of Lifuella gorgonensis (Hastings, 1930): synonym of Pleuromucrum gorgonense (Hastings, 1930)
- Hyalinella vaihiriae Hastings, 1929: synonym of Plumatella vaihiriae (Hastings, 1929)
- Klugella Hastings, 1943
- Klugella buski Hastings, 1943
- Leptoclinides lissus Hastings, 1931
- Menipea kempi Hastings, 1943
- Menipea zelandica Hastings, 1943
- Notoplites crassiscutus Hastings, 1943
- Notoplites uniserialis Hastings, 1943
- Onychocella alula Hastings, 1930
- Petralia litoralis Hastings, 1932: synonym of Sinupetraliella litoralis (Hastings, 1932)
- Polysyncraton magnetae Hastings, 1931
- Tubulipora lobifera Hastings, 1963
- Umbonula littoralis Hastings, 1944: synonym of Oshurkovia littoralis (Hastings, 1944)
- Umbonula ovicellata Hastings, 1944
- Valdemunitella tubulata Hastings, 1930: synonym of Retevirgula tubulata (Hastings, 1930)
- Zanclea protecta Hastings, 1930: synonym of Halocoryne protecta (Hastings, 1930)
