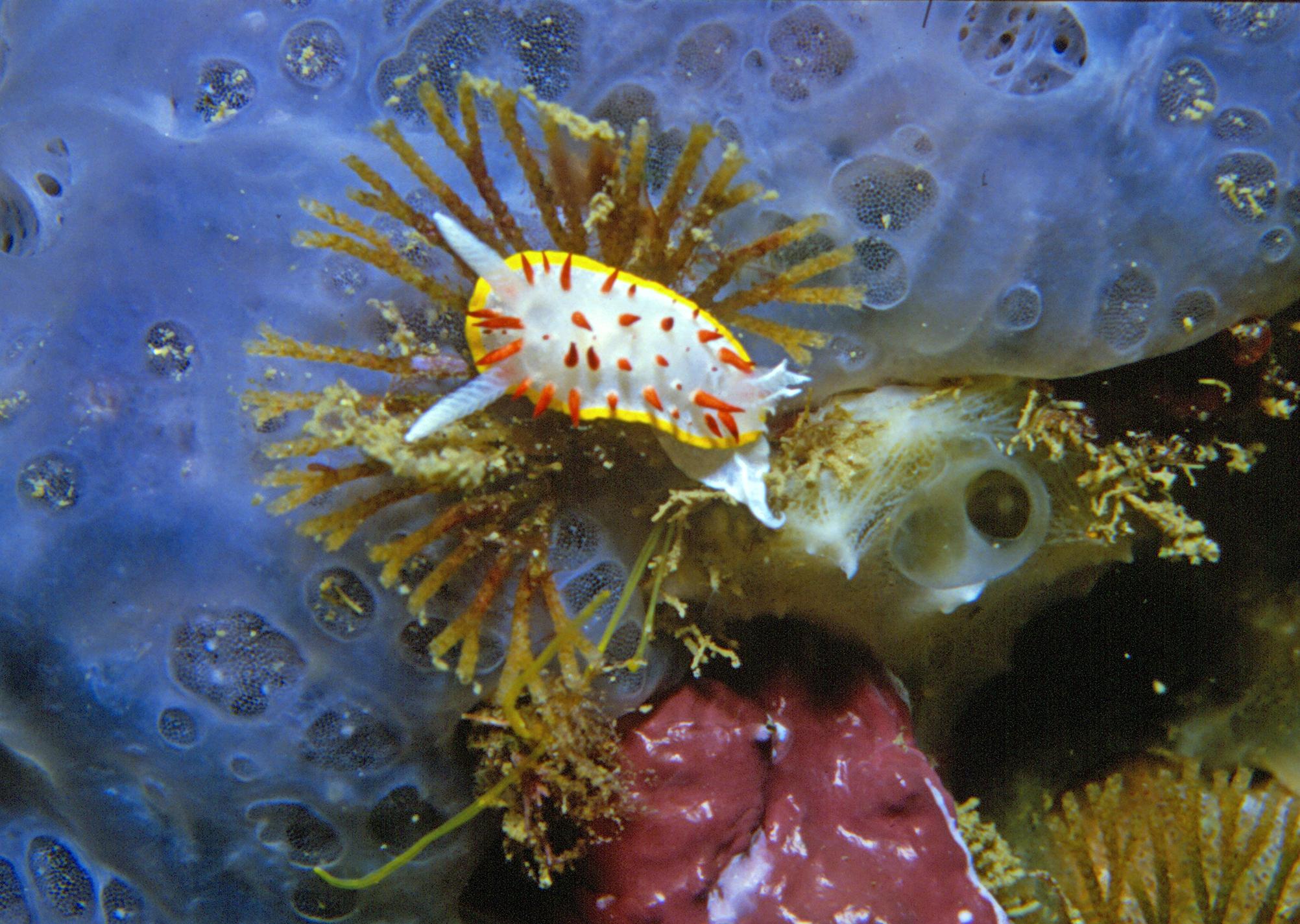
- The nudibranch Diaphorodoris papillata Portmann & Sandmeier, 1960 feeding on Bugula neritina (Linnaeus, 1758)

Scientific classification
- Kingdom: Animalia
- Phylum: Bryozoa
- Class: Gymnolaemata
- Order: Cheilostomatida
- Family: Bugulidae
- Genus: Bugula; Oken, 1815

= Bugula =

Genus of moss animals

Bugula is a genus of common colonial arborescent bryozoa, often mistaken for seaweed. It commonly grows upright in bushy colonies of up to 15 cm in height.

== Distribution ==
The native distribution of Bugula neritina is presumed to be tropical and subtropical waters; however, it has become widespread globally due to attachment to the hulls of vessels. It is considered an invasive species in some countries.

== Bugula neritina ==
Bugula neritina attracted interest as a source of cytotoxic chemicals, bryostatins, under clinical investigation as anti-cancer agents. It was first collected and provided to JL Hartwell's anticancer drug discovery group at the National Cancer Institute (NCI) by Jack Rudloe. In 2001 pharmaceutical company GPC Biotech licensed Bryostatin 1 from Arizona State University for commercial development as a treatment for cancer. GPC Biotech canceled development in 2003, saying that Bryostatin 1 showed little effectiveness and some toxic side-effects. More recent work shows it has positive effects on cognition in sufferers of Alzheimers with few side effects.

== Other uses ==
Dried Bugula are commonly used as decorations:

"Air fern", the so-called everlasting plant that supposedly absorbs from air all the moisture it needs to live, is commonly dried colonies of the bryozoan Bugula that have been artificially coloured.

However, Sertularia argentea are also sold as "air ferns."

== Species ==
- Bugula alba Vieira, Winston & Fehlauer-Ale, 2012
- Bugula apsteini Hasenbank, 1932
- Bugula aspinosa Liu, 1984
- Bugula biota Vieira, Winston & Fehlauer-Ale, 2012
- Bugula capensis Waters, 1887
- Bugula ceylonensis Winston & Woollacott, 2008
- Bugula crosslandi Hastings, 1939
- Bugula decipiens Hayward, 1981
- Bugula expansa Hastings, 1939
- Bugula fastigiata Dalyell, 1847
- Bugula fastigiata Kluge, 1929
- Bugula gautieri Ryland, 1962
- Bugula gnoma Vieira, Winston & Fehlauer-Ale, 2012
- Bugula hessei Hasenbank, 1932
- Bugula ingens Vieira, Winston & Fehlauer-Ale, 2012
- Bugula intermedia Liu, 1984
- Bugula longissima Busk, 1884
- Bugula lophodendron Ortmann, 1890
- Bugula migottoi Vieira, Winston & Fehlauer-Ale, 2012
- Bugula miniatella Winston & Woollacott, 2008
- Bugula minima Waters, 1909
- Bugula neritina (Linnaeus, 1758)
- Bugula neritinoides Hastings, 1939
- Bugula orientalis Liu, 1984
- Bugula paternostrae Winston & Woollacott, 2008
- Bugula philippsae Harmer, 1926
- Bugula prismatica (Gray, 1843)
- Bugula protensa Hayward, 1981
- Bugula providensis Winston & Woollacott, 2008
- Bugula robusta MacGillivray, 1869
- Bugula robustoides Winston & Woollacott, 2008
- Bugula rochae Vieira, Winston & Fehlauer-Ale, 2012
- Bugula scaphoides Kirkpatrick, 1890
- Bugula scaphula Tilbrook, Hayward & Gordon, 2001
- Bugula simpliciformis Osburn, 1932
- Bugula solorensis Winston & Woollacott, 2008
- Bugula subglobosa Harmer, 1926
- Bugula tschukotkensis Kluge, 1952
- Bugula tsunamiensis McCuller, Carlton & Geller, 2018
- Bugula umbelliformis Yanagi & Okada, 1918
- Bugula vectifera Harmer, 1926

Former species

- Bugula angustiloba (Lamarck, 1816) now classified as Bugulina angustiloba (Lamarck, 1816)
- Bugula aperta (Hincks, 1886) now classified as Crisularia aperta (Hincks, 1886)
- Bugula aquilirostris Ryland, 1960 now classified as Bugulina aquilirostris (Ryland, 1960)
- Bugula avicularia (Linnaeus, 1758) now classified as Bugulina avicularia (Linnaeus, 1758)
- Bugula bengalensis Rao & Ganapati, 1974 now classified as Crisularia bengalensis (Rao & Ganapati, 1974)
- Bugula bicornis Busk, 1884 now classified as Camptoplites bicornis (Busk, 1884)
- Bugula borealis (Packard, 1863) now classified as Bugulina borealis (Packard, 1863)
- Bugula bowiei Vieira, Winston & Fehlauer-Ale, 2012 now classified as Crisularia bowiei (Vieira, Winston & Fehlauer-Ale, 2012)
- Bugula calathus Norman, 1868 now classified as Bugulina calathus (Norman, 1868)
- Bugula californica Robertson, 1905 now classified as Bugulina californica (Robertson, 1905)
- Bugula carvalhoi Marcus, 1949 now classified as Bugulina carvalhoi (Marcus, 1949)
- Bugula cucullata Busk, 1867 now classified as Crisularia cucullata (Busk, 1867)
- Bugula cucullifera Osburn, 1912 now classified as Crisularia cucullifera (Osburn, 1912)
- Bugula cuspidata Hastings, 1943 now classified as Crisularia cuspidata (Hastings, 1943)
- Bugula dentata (Lamouroux, 1816) now classified as Virididentula dentata (Lamouroux, 1816)
- Bugula dispar Harmer, 1926 now classified as Crisularia dispar (Harmer, 1926)
- Bugula ditrupae Busk, 1858 now classified as Bugulina ditrupae (Busk, 1858)
- Bugula eburnea Calvet, 1906 now classified as Bugulina eburnea (Calvet, 1906)
- Bugula elongata Nordgaard, 1906 now classified as Dendrobeania decorata (Verrill, 1879)
- Bugula flabellata (Thompson, in Gray, 1848) now classified as Bugulina flabellata (Thompson, in Gray, 1848)
- Bugula foliolata Vieira, Winston & Fehlauer-Ale, 2012 now classified as Bugulina foliolata (Vieira, Winston & Fehlauer-Ale, 2012)
- Bugula fulva Ryland, 1960 now classified as Bugulina fulva (Ryland, 1960)
- Bugula germanae (Calvet, 1902) now classified as Crisularia serrata (Lamarck, 1816)
- Bugula gracilis Busk, 1858 now classified as Crisularia gracilis (Busk, 1858)
- Bugula grayi Maturo, 1966 now classified as Crisularia grayi (Maturo, 1966)
- Bugula guara Vieira, Winston & Fehlauer-Ale, 2012 now classified as Crisularia guara (Vieira, Winston & Fehlauer-Ale, 2012)
- Bugula harmsworthi Waters, 1900 now classified as Crisularia harmsworthi (Waters, 1900)
- Bugula hyadesi Jullien, 1888 now classified as Crisularia hyadesi (Jullien, 1888)
- Bugula japonica now classified as Dendrobeania japonica (Ortmann, 1890)
- Bugula johnstonae (Gray, 1843) now classified as Halophila johnstonae Gray, 1843
- Bugula leontodon Busk, 1884 now classified as Himantozoum leontodon (Busk, 1884)
- Bugula longicauda Harmer, 1926 now classified as Halophila longicauda (Busk, 1884)
- Bugula longirostrata Robertson, 1905 now classified as Bugulina longirostrata (Robertson, 1905)
- Bugula marcusi Maturo, 1966 now classified as Crisularia marcusi (Maturo, 1966)
- Bugula margaritifera Busk, 1884 now classified as Himantozoum margaritiferum (Busk, 1884)
- Bugula microoecia Osburn, 1914 now classified as Crisularia microoecia (Osburn, 1914)
- Bugula mirabilis Busk, 1884 now classified as Himantozoum mirabilis (Busk, 1884)
- Bugula mollis Harmer, 1926 now classified as Crisularia mollis (Harmer, 1926)
- Bugula multiserialis (d'Orbigny, 1841) now classified as Bugulina multiserialis (d'Orbigny, 1841)
- Bugula nana Androsova, 1977 now classified as Crisularia nana (Androsova, 1977)
- Bugula pacifica Robertson, 1905 now classified as Crisularia pacifica (Robertson, 1905)
- Bugula pedata Harmer, 1926 now classified as Bugulina pedata (Harmer, 1926)
- Bugula plumosa (Pallas, 1766) now classified as Crisularia plumosa (Pallas, 1766)
- Bugula prenanti Castric-Fey, 1971 now classified as Crisularia prenanti (Castric-Fey, 1971)
- Bugula pugeti Robertson, 1905 now classified as Bugulina pugeti (Robertson, 1905)
- Bugula purpurotincta Norman, 1868 now classified as Crisularia purpurotincta (Norman, 1868)
- Bugula reticulata Busk, 1884 now classified as Camptoplites reticulatus (Busk, 1884)
- Bugula rylandi Maturo, 1966 now classified as Crisularia rylandi (Maturo, 1966)
- Bugula serrata (Lamarck, 1816) now classified as Crisularia serrata (Lamarck, 1816)
- Bugula simplex Hincks, 1886 now classified as Bugulina simplex (Hincks, 1886)
- Bugula sinuosa Busk, 1884 now classified as Himantozoum sinuosum (Busk, 1884)
- Bugula spicata (Hincks, 1886) now classified as Bugulina spicata (Hincks, 1886)
- Bugula stolonifera Ryland, 1960 now classified as Bugulina stolonifera (Ryland, 1960)
- Bugula tricuspis Kluge, 1955 now classified as Bugulina tricuspis (Kluge, 1955)
- Bugula turbinata Alder, 1857 now classified as Bugulina turbinata (Alder, 1857)
- Bugula turrita (Desor, 1848) now classified as Crisularia turrita (Desor, 1848)
- Bugula versicolor Busk, 1884 now classified as Semidendrobeania versicolor (Busk, 1884)
