= Bicellariella ciliata =

Scientific classification
- Kingdom: Animalia
- Phylum: Bryozoa
- Class: Gymnolaemata
- Order: Cheilostomatida
- Family: Bugulidae
- Genus: Bicellariella
- Species: B. ciliata

Binomial name
- Bicellariella ciliata (Linnaeus, 1758)

Synonyms
- Brettia tubaeformis Hincks, 1880; Crisia ciliata (Linnaeus, 1758); Sertularia ciliata Linnaeus, 1758

Species of bryozoan

Bicellariella ciliata is a species of bryozoan belonging to the family Bugulidae. It is found in shallow water on both sides of the Atlantic Ocean, the Mediterranean Sea and the Indo-Pacific region.

== Description ==
Bicellariella ciliata is a colonial bryozoan and has an upright, branched habit, and forms small white, feathery clumps up to 2.5 cm (1 in) in height. The colony is fixed to the substrate by a narrow flexible base. The zooids grow on branches, facing alternately to left and right, and appearing as regular black spots to the naked eye. Each feeding zooid has a cone-shaped tube leading to a bean-shaped chamber; the lophophore has four to six long curved tentacles. Some zooids have a toothed "beak" which is used for defensive purposes. Bugulina flabellata, Crisularia plumosa and Bugulina turbinata are other bryozoans of very similar morphology with which Bicellariella ciliata may be confused. Bicellariella ciliata can form a bryozoan "turf" with these three.

== Distribution and habitat ==
Bicellariella ciliata has a widespread distribution. It occurs in the Mediterranean Sea, in the eastern Atlantic Ocean, from Norway to South Africa, in the western Atlantic Ocean from Cape Cod to the Gulf of St. Lawrence and in the Indo-Pacific region. It grows in rocky locations such as vertical walls exposed to moderate currents, at depths between 10 and 30 m (30 and 100 ft). It often grows as an epibiont on shells, on hydrozoans and on other bryozoans.

== Ecology ==
Like other bryozoans, Bicellariella ciliata is a filter feeder, consuming diatoms and other small organic particles which it catches with the ever-active tentacles of its lophophore. Colonies have both male and female zooids; reproduction mainly takes place in late March and April, giving rise to planktonic larvae in May and June. These settle on the seabed in August and undergo metamorphosis into single zooids which will found new colonies which will overwinter. This species is more noticeable in winter and spring than it is in mid-summer. Bicellariella ciliata is one of the bryozoans on which the nudibranch Antiopella cristata, and the nudibranch Polycera faeroensis feeds.
