= Halocharis =

Halocharis may refer to:

- Halocharis (plant), a genus of plants in the family Amaranthaceae
- Halocharis, a genus of wasps in the family Eulophidae, synonym of Closterocerus
- Halocharis, a genus of cnidarians in the family Zancleidae, synonym of Zanclea
