= Bryozoology =

Branch of zoology specializing in Bryozoa

Bryozoology is a branch of zoology specializing in Bryozoa, commonly known as moss animals, a phylum of aquatic invertebrates that live in clonal colonies.

== Organizations ==
The International Bryozoology Association was founded in August 1968 by 16 zoologists and paleozoologists in Stockholm.

== Journals ==
- Annals of Bryozoology

== Bryozoologists ==
- Anna Birchall Hastings
- Samantha L.L. Hill
- Eliza Jelly
- Randolph Kirkpatrick
- Raymond C. Osburn
- Mary Dora Rogick
- Ehrhard Voigt
- Timothy S. Wood
