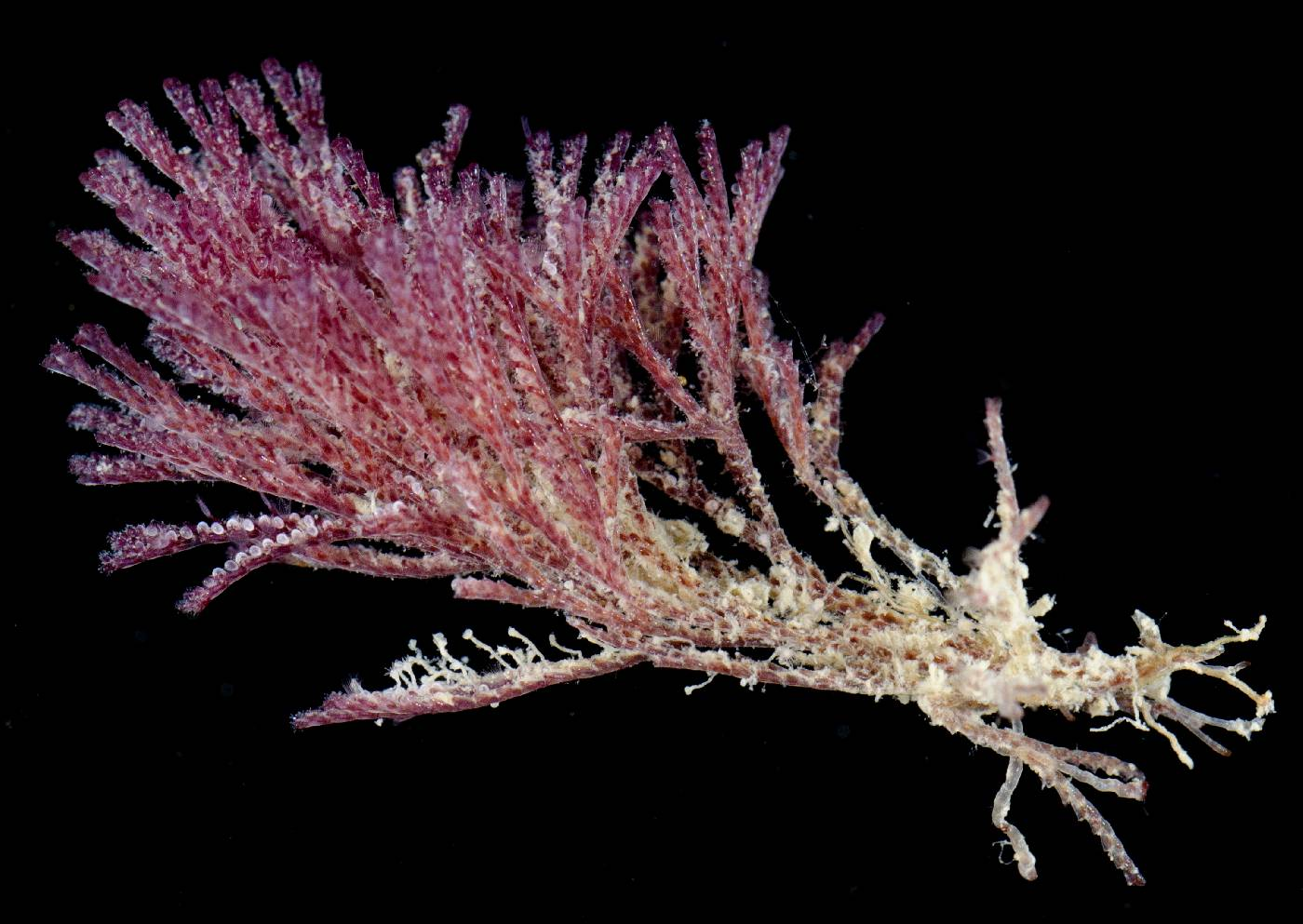

Scientific classification
- Kingdom: Animalia
- Phylum: Bryozoa
- Class: Gymnolaemata
- Order: Cheilostomatida
- Family: Bugulidae
- Genus: Bugula
- Species: B. neritina

Binomial name
- Bugula neritina (Linnaeus, 1758)

Synonyms
- Sertularia neritina Linnaeus, 1758 (basionym)

= Bugula neritina =

Species complex of marine animal

Bugula neritina (commonly known as brown bryozoan or common bugula) is a cryptic species complex of sessile marine animal in the genus Bugula. It has a practically cosmopolitan distribution, being found in temperate and tropical waters around the world, and it has become an invasive species in numerous locations. It is often found in hard substrates, such as rocks, shells, pillars and ship hulls, where it can form dense mats, contributing to biofouling. B. neritina is of biomedical interest because it harbors a bacterial symbiont that produces a group of bioactive compounds with potential applications in the treatment of numerous diseases.

== Biology ==
=== Description ===
B. neritina forms fouling colonies of brown-purplish color, it feeds itself with particles in suspension for being a sessile animal. Besides that, its zooids (individuals that compose the colony) are white, with a pointed exterior corner and differentiates itself of the other species of the genus by not presenting the following zooids: avicularium and spine zooids.

The colonies tend to live more than one year, and their zooids are hermaphrodites, with the dispersion of gametes in different times of life, avoiding self fecundation.

In their life cycle, a zooid is originated by sexual reproduction and develops the colony by budding, the fixation is done the whole year, with exception of the period of mid-winter, by the lecithotrophic larva. It is valid to point out that B. neritina is hermaphrodite.

=== Phylogeny ===
The Bugula neritina species is inserted in the clade Lophophorata due to the presence of a lophophore, a feeding structure that is the synapomorphy characteristic of the group. Phylum Bryozoa, class Gymnolaemata and order Cheilostomatida, as the external wall is calcified. They belong to the Bugulidae family and the genus Bugula.

=== Distribution ===
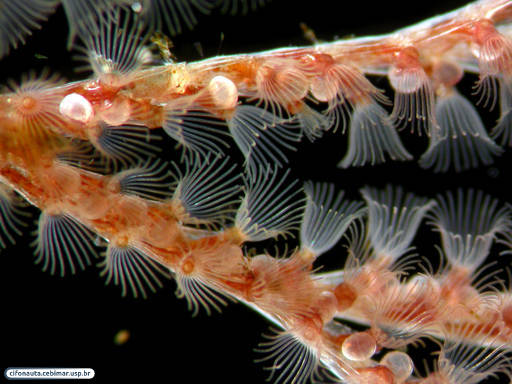
Lophophores of Bugula neritina

The Bugula neritina species, one of the first bryozoans to be discovered and considered as the type species of the Bugula genus, are colonial and marine animals, with a wide geographical distribution. They are actually considered a complex of three cryptic species, morphologically equal, but with a few genetic differences, and the haplotype S1 is the most distributed.

They are virtually cosmopolitans and, in many regions, invasives, once they can be found in almost the whole globe, with exception of the north and south poles, subarctic and subantarctic, being commonly present in the coastal regions of the North Pacific and North Atlantic; in Australia, New Zealand, United States and Hawaii, Mediterranean Sea and even in Brazil. These animals have preference for shallow and warm waters, between 10 and 30 °C, being found in port areas and in ship hulls, which facilitated their dispersion and introduction in new regions. B. neritina forms biofouling colonies of approximately 10 centimeters of height, preferring organic and rigid substrates.

== Larvae ==
Larvae of Bugula neritina is a lecithotrophic larvae, commonly used in research as model species, as they become competent for settling shortly after release. Bugula larvae shows characteristics behavior, which make them useful for larvae behavior research.

== Interactions with humans ==
=== Drug discovery ===
Chemical structure of Bryostatin 1ACS

Bugula neritina is of interest from a drug discovery perspective because its bacterial symbiont, Candidatus Endobugula sertula, produces the bryostatins, a group of around twenty bioactive natural products. The bryostatins are under investigation for their therapeutic potential directed at cancer, treatment of Alzheimer's disease, and HIV/AIDS, due to their low toxicity and antineoplastic activity.

Despite that, there is a challenge in the utilization of bryostatins in medical treatments, given that it is only found in small quantities in the organisms, making it unfeasible for the replication of the process. In addition, the symbiotic relationship of B. neritina and the bacteria Candidatus Endobugula sertula has not yet been searched enough, bringing difficulties for the biosynthetics in the study about the cultivation of this bacteria.

=== Invasive species ===
The invasive aspect of this species occurs from, besides the dispersion of colonies in ship hulls, for the fact that they have high tolerance to toxic environments, including copper pollution, which confers a competitive advantage for the B. neritina in polluted environments.
