= Cellularia =

Cellularia may refer to two different taxonomic genera:

- Cellularia Pallas, 1766, a taxonomic synonym for Cellaria, a genus of bryozoans
- Cellularia Bull. (1788), a taxonomic synonym for Trametes, a genus of fungi
