= Petralia =

Petralia may refer to:

- Petralia Soprana, municipality in Sicily
- Petralia Sottana, municipality in Sicily
- Petralia (bryozoan), a genus of bryozoans in the family Petraliidae
- Petralia (surname)
