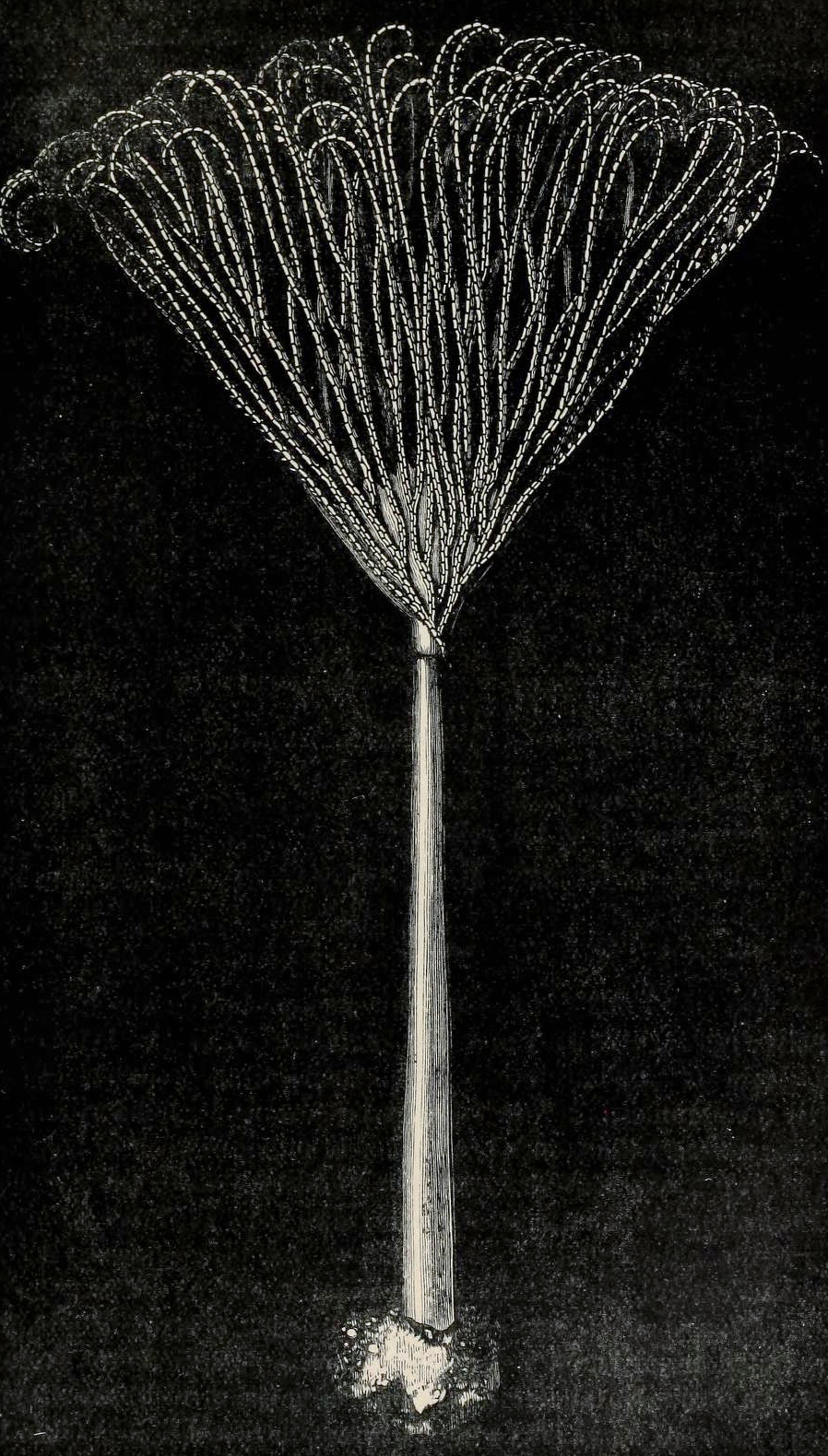
- Kinetoskias cyathus

Scientific classification
- Kingdom: Animalia
- Phylum: Bryozoa
- Class: Gymnolaemata
- Order: Cheilostomatida
- Family: Bugulidae
- Genus: Kinetoskias; Danielssen, 1868

Synonyms
- Naresia Wyville Thompson, 1873

= Kinetoskias =

Genus of bryozoans

Kinetoskias is a genus of bryozoans belonging to the family Bugulidae.

The genus has a cosmopolitan distribution.

== Species ==
The following species are recognised in the genus Kinetoskias:

- Kinetoskias arborescens Danielssen, 1868
- Kinetoskias beringi Kluge, 1953
- Kinetoskias cyathus (Wyville Thomson, 1873)
- Kinetoskias elegans Menzies, 1963
- Kinetoskias elongata Harmer, 1926
- Kinetoskias mitsukurii Yanagi & Okada, 1918
- Kinetoskias oblongata Liu, 1982
- Kinetoskias pocillum Busk, 1881
- Kinetoskias sileni d'Hondt, 1975
- Kinetoskias smitti Danielssen, 1868
- Kinetoskias vegae Menzies, 1963
