= Bugulella =

Scientific classification
- Kingdom: Animalia
- Phylum: Bryozoa
- Class: Gymnolaemata
- Order: Cheilostomatida
- Family: Bugulidae
- Genus: Bugulella; Verrill, 1879

Synonyms
- Erymophora Hastings, 1943

Genus of bryozoans

Bugulella is a genus of bryozoans belonging to the family Bugulidae.

The species of this genus are found in Southern Hemisphere.

== Species ==
The following species are recognised in the genus Bugulella:

- Bugulella elegans Hayward, 1978
- Bugulella fragilis Verrill, 1879
- Bugulella gracilis (Nichols, 1911)
- Bugulella klugei (Hastings, 1943)
- Bugulella problematica Hayward & Cook, 1983
- Bugulella sinica Liu, 1984
