= Dendrobeania =

Scientific classification
- Kingdom: Animalia
- Phylum: Bryozoa
- Class: Gymnolaemata
- Order: Cheilostomatida
- Family: Bugulidae
- Genus: Dendrobeania; Levinsen, 1909

Genus of bryozoans

Dendrobeania is a genus of bryozoans belonging to the family Bugulidae.

The genus has an almost cosmopolitan distribution.

== Species ==
The following species are recognised in the genus :

- Dendrobeania birostrata (Yanagi & Okada, 1918)
- Dendrobeania curvirostrata (Robertson, 1905)
- Dendrobeania decorata (Verrill, 1879)
- Dendrobeania elongata (Nordgaard, 1903)
- Dendrobeania exilis (Hincks, 1882)
- Dendrobeania fessa Kluge, 1955
- Dendrobeania flustroides (Levinsen, 1887)
- Dendrobeania formosissima d'Hondt, 1983
- Dendrobeania frigida (Waters, 1900)
- Dendrobeania fruticosa (Packard, 1863)
- Dendrobeania japonica (Ortmann, 1890)
- Dendrobeania klugei Androsova, 1958
- Dendrobeania kurilensis (Okada, 1933)
- Dendrobeania lamellosa Canu & Bassler, 1928
- Dendrobeania laxa (Robertson, 1905)
- Dendrobeania levinseni (Kluge, 1929)
- Dendrobeania lichenoides (Robertson, 1900)
- Dendrobeania longispinosa (Robertson, 1905)
- Dendrobeania multiseriata (O'Donoghue, 1925)
- Dendrobeania murmanica Kluge, 1955
- Dendrobeania murrayana (Bean, 1847)
- Dendrobeania myrrayana
- Dendrobeania orientalis Kluge, 1952
- Dendrobeania ortmanni Androsova, 1958
- Dendrobeania pseudexilis d'Hondt & Gordon, 1996
- Dendrobeania pseudolevinseni Kluge, 1952
- Dendrobeania pseudomurrayana Kluge, 1955
- Dendrobeania quadridentata (Lovén, 1834)
- Dendrobeania sessilis (d'Hondt, 1974)
- Dendrobeania simplex (O'Donoghue & O'Donoghue, 1923)
- Dendrobeania sinica Liu, 1984
- Dendrobeania tenuis Kluge, 1955
