= Henry Dighton Thomas =

Henry Dighton Thomas (1900-1966) was a geologist and academic at the University of Cambridge and Natural History Museum.

Henry Dighton Thomas was born in London on 31 October 1900. He attended Westminster City School in his youth and with the encouragement of one of his Masters, pursued geology as a favourite subject. He won an Open Scholarship to Emmanuel College, Cambridge where he took his degree in 1923, with a Second Class Pass in Part II of the Natural Sciences Tripos.

== Career ==
Thomas worked as a Supervisor in Geology for many colleges at Cambridge, as well as vacation lecturer, while working toward his M.A. and PhD, which he received in 1928. His study was that of the Upper Carboniferous faunas of Peru, using specimens from the Sedgwick Museum. Thomas was appointed lecturer at Bedford College in 1927–1928.

Thomas was appointed to the Department of Geology of the British Museum (Natural History) in 1928. The specimens in his care included Coelenterata, Polyzoan and Porifera. He worked closely with W.D. Lang, the Keeper of the Museum, and they published the Index of Palaeozoic coral genera in 1940, with Bristol academic Stanley Smith. In all, Thomas would publish 40 papers or reports, most of them related to fossil corals, Polyzoan and sponges. He would act as a mentor to many students of palaeontology, including Dorothy Hill.

Thomas married Anna Birchall Hastings (1902-1977) a bryozoologist at the British Museum in 1941. Although she had to resign work upon her marriage, she continued to work unpaid as a volunteer until 1961. They had one son, James.

During World War II, the collections he helped to manage were moved to Lincolnshire to protect them from the bombing of London which was anticipated.

Thomas became a Fellow of the Geological Society of London in 1949. He received a Murchison Fund award from the Geological Society in 1950.

Thomas became Deputy Keeper of Palaeontology in 1963, and retired in 1965. He continued to volunteer at the Museum until his death in London in 1966.

Henry Dighton Thomas died on 31 August 1966 and was survived by his wife and son.
