= Petralia (surname) =

Petralia is a surname of Italian origin. People with that name include:

- Kathryn Petralia, American entrepreneur, co-founder and COO of Kabbage
- Mickey Petralia, American record producer
- Fani Palli-Petralia, Greek lawyer, New Democracy politician and a former Minister for Employment and Social Protection

== See also ==
- Petralia (disambiguation)
