= Bugulina turbinata =

Scientific classification
- Kingdom: Animalia
- Phylum: Bryozoa
- Class: Gymnolaemata
- Order: Cheilostomatida
- Family: Bugulidae
- Genus: Bugulina
- Species: B. turbinata

Binomial name
- Bugulina turbinata (Alder, 1857)

Synonyms
- Bugula turbinata Alder, 1857

Marine invertebrate

Bugulina turbinata is a species of bryozoan belonging to the family Bugulidae. It is found in shallow water in the northeastern Atlantic Ocean and the Mediterranean Sea.

== Description ==
Bugulina turbinata is a colonial bryozoan that forms small bushy clumps, up to 6 cm (2 in) in height. These are orange or pale brown, and are attached to a hard substrate by an extension of the rhizoids at the base. Each frond has branchlets growing out in a spiral arrangement, each with two rows, widening to three to four rows, of zooids. The individual zooids are rectangular, about 0.5 by 0.2 mm (0.02 by 0.01 in), with a short spine at each upper corner. The lophophore consists of thirteen tentacles and the avicularia is rounded and projects like a bird's head with a hooked beak, just below the spines. The conspicuous brood chambers are globular, and during the summer, yellow embryos can be seen developing inside.

== Ecology ==
Developing embryos of Bugulina turbinata are retained within a brood chamber, and the larvae are only free-swimming for a short period of less than 36 hours. This means that dispersal potential is limited; in a research study, no new colonies of Bugulina turbinata developed on settlement plates in suitable habitat despite there being colonies of the bryozoan on bedrock nearby. Bugulina turbinata is one of the species that form a bryozoan "turf", along with Bicellariella ciliata and Bugulina flabellata, on steep or vertical, moderately wave-exposed rock, round the coasts of Britain just below the littoral zone; this habitat tends to be dominated by aggregations of the jewel anemone Corynactis viridis and the cup coral Caryophyllia smithii.
