= Chaperiidae =

Scientific classification
- Kingdom: Animalia
- Phylum: Bryozoa
- Class: Gymnolaemata
- Order: Cheilostomatida
- Suborder: Flustrina
- Superfamily: Calloporoidea
- Family: Chaperiidae; Jullien, 1888

Family of bryozoans

Chaperiidae is a family of bryozoans belonging to the order Cheilostomatida.

== Genera ==
The following genera are recognised in the family Chaperiidae:

- †Aluis López-Gappa & Pérez, 2019
- †Bryochaperia Zágoršek, 2001
- †Catenariopsis Maplestone, 1889
- Chaperia Jullien, 1881
- Chaperiopsis Uttley, 1949
- Exallozoon Gordon, 1982
- Exostesia Brown, 1948
- Icelozoon Gordon, 1982
- Larnacicus Norman, 1903
- Notocoryne Hayward & Cook, 1979
- Patsyella Brown, 1948
- Pyrichaperia Gordon, 1982
