= Eliza Catherine Jelly =

Pioneer English bryozoologist

Eliza Catherine Jelly (28 September 1829 – 3 November 1914) was an English bryozoologist. She was one of the first women to work and publish in the field of bryozoology. Her 1889 text The Synonymic Catalogue of the Recent Marine Bryozoa is still used as a reference material.

== Early life ==
Eliza Catherine Jelly was born in Bath, Somerset, the daughter of Harry Jelly, an Anglican clergyman, and Eliza Jelly (née Cave), who came from a family of builders in Bath. Her father Harry, orphaned as an infant, was a naturalist and had long been interested in paleontology, and frequently went searching for fossils, plants, and insects. He is recorded as having donated fossils from Wiltshire to the Bath Literary and Philosophical Institute in 1826. He later took a fossil-collecting trip to Jamaica and donated these specimens to the Geological Society of London in September 1839.

The Jelly family lived in Bath and Bristol until Eliza was about 13 years old. The family later moved to Devon where Eliza resided until 1860 when her mother died. After her death, Jelly lived in the household of Colonel William Stewart at Eldon Villa in Bristol, as a governess and a 'lady's companion'. After Stewart died in 1865 and left Eliza £400, she moved to the Wirral Peninsula in Cheshire.

== Career ==
Jelly's first and only scientific publication, a list of both land and freshwater mollusks of Bristol, was published while she was living at Eldon Villa. It was published under the name E.C. Jellie, using a spelling of her surname her brother had adopted but which Eliza later reverted.

Between 1870 and 1880, Jelly sent a series of letters to the botanist Edward Adolphus Holmes, five of which are preserved in the archives of the Linnean Society of London. In 1870 she discussed the moss Dicranella fallax (Wilson, 1870) that she had found in "a deep[-]ish ditch, down close to the water & hidden by grass". Robert Braithwaite, the bryologist, referred to her discovery of D. fallax, as well as another moss from Teignmouth, in his own works. In 1870, her letters mentioned Plumularia myriophyllum, a species of hydrozoans. Holmes had also sent her samples of an unidentified zoophytes, which she returned them to him, saying that she was unable to identify one of them as it did not belong to any of the families she was studying, suggesting her mastery with seaweeds, algae, lichen, and mosses.

She never married. She and her long time friend, Edith Williams, with whom she lived for many years, were buried together in a double grave in the Chart Lane cemetery of Reigate in Surrey.

== Legacy ==
A number of taxa have been named after Jelly, including Euthyroides jellyae, the Cretaceous species of cyclostomata Truncatula jellyae, the Jurassic species Multiclausa jellyae, the Australian species Tervia jellyae named by Sidney Frederic Harmer, the genus Jellyella, described in 1997, and the New Zealand species Exochella jellyae named by David Alexander Brown.
