= Crisularia =

Scientific classification
- Kingdom: Animalia
- Phylum: Bryozoa
- Class: Gymnolaemata
- Order: Cheilostomatida
- Family: Bugulidae
- Genus: Crisularia; Gray, 1848

Genus of bryozoans

Crisularia is a genus of bryozoans belonging to the family Bugulidae.

The genus has an almost cosmopolitan distribution.

== Species ==
The following species are recognised in the genus Crisularia:

- Crisularia aperta (Hincks, 1886)
- Crisularia bengalensis (Rao & Ganapati, 1974)
- Crisularia bowiei (Vieira, Winston & Fehlauer-Ale, 2012)
- Crisularia cucullata (Busk, 1867)
- Crisularia cucullifera (Osburn, 1912)
- Crisularia cuspidata (Hastings, 1943)
- Crisularia dispar (Harmer, 1926)
- Crisularia gracilis (Busk, 1858)
- Crisularia grayi (Maturo, 1966)
- Crisularia guara (Vieira, Winston & Fehlauer-Ale, 2012)
- Crisularia harmsworthi (Waters, 1900)
- Crisularia hyadesi (Jullien, 1888)
- Crisularia marcusi (Maturo, 1966)
- Crisularia microoecia (Osburn, 1914)
- Crisularia mollis (Harmer, 1926)
- Crisularia nana (Androsova, 1977)
- Crisularia pacifica (Robertson, 1905)
- Crisularia plumosa (Pallas, 1766)
- Crisularia prenanti (Castric-Fey, 1971)
- Crisularia purpurotincta (Norman, 1868)
- Crisularia rylandi (Maturo, 1966)
- Crisularia serrata (Lamarck, 1816)
- Crisularia turrita (Desor, 1848)
