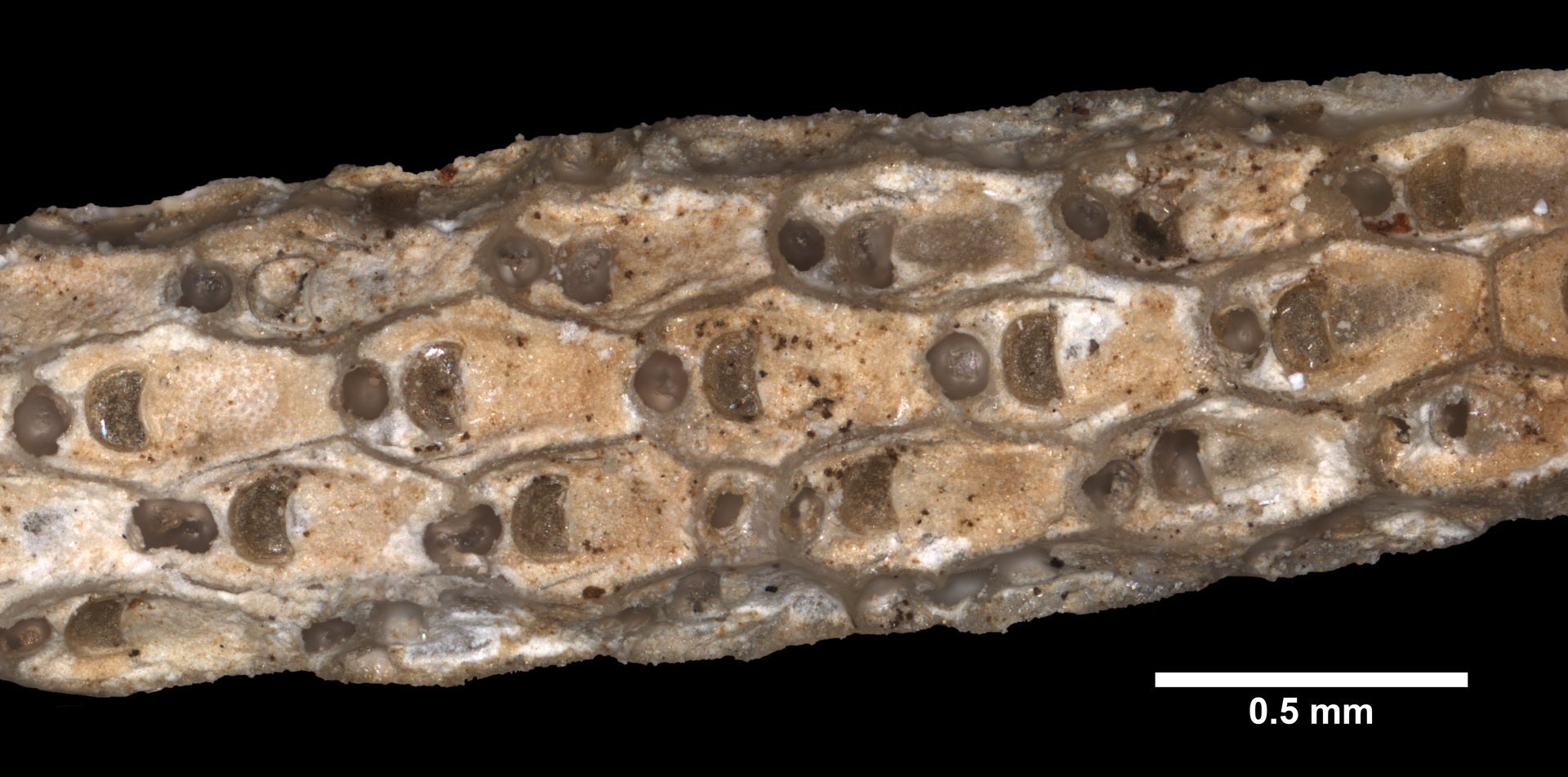

Scientific classification
- Kingdom: Animalia
- Phylum: Bryozoa
- Class: Gymnolaemata
- Order: Cheilostomatida
- Suborder: Flustrina
- Superfamily: Cellarioidea
- Family: Cellariidae; Fleming, 1828

= Cellariidae =

Family of bryozoans

Cellariidae is a family of bryozoans belonging to the order Cheilostomatida.

== Genera ==
The following genera are recognised in the family Cellariidae:

- †Acerinucleus Brown, 1958
- Atelestozoum Harmer, 1926
- Cellaria Ellis & Solander, 1786
- Cellariaeforma Rogick, 1956
- Cryptostomaria Canu & Bassler, 1927
- †Dimorphocellaria Voigt, 1930
- Dubiocellaria d'Hondt & Schopf, 1985
- †Erinella Canu & Bassler, 1927
- †Escharicellaria Voigt, 1924
- Euginoma Jullien, 1882
- Formosocellaria d'Hondt, 1981
- Melicerita Milne Edwards, 1836
- Mesostomaria Canu & Bassler, 1927
- Paracellaria Moyano, 1969
- Smitticellaria Gordon & Taylor, 1999
- Steginocellaria David & Pouyet, 1986
- Stomhypselosaria Canu & Bassler, 1927
- Swanomia Hayward & Thorpe, 1989
- Syringotrema Harmer, 1926
