= Cryptostomaria =

Scientific classification
- Kingdom: Animalia
- Phylum: Bryozoa
- Class: Gymnolaemata
- Order: Cheilostomatida
- Family: Cellariidae
- Genus: Cryptostomaria; Canu & Bassler, 1927

Genus of bryozoans

Cryptostomaria is a genus of bryozoans belonging to the family Cellariidae.

The species of this genus are found in Oceania.

== Species ==
The following species are recognised in the genus Cryptostomaria:

- Cryptostomaria alata d'Hondt & Gordon, 1999
- Cryptostomaria crassatina Canu & Bassler, 1927
- Cryptostomaria cylindrica (Harmer, 1926)
