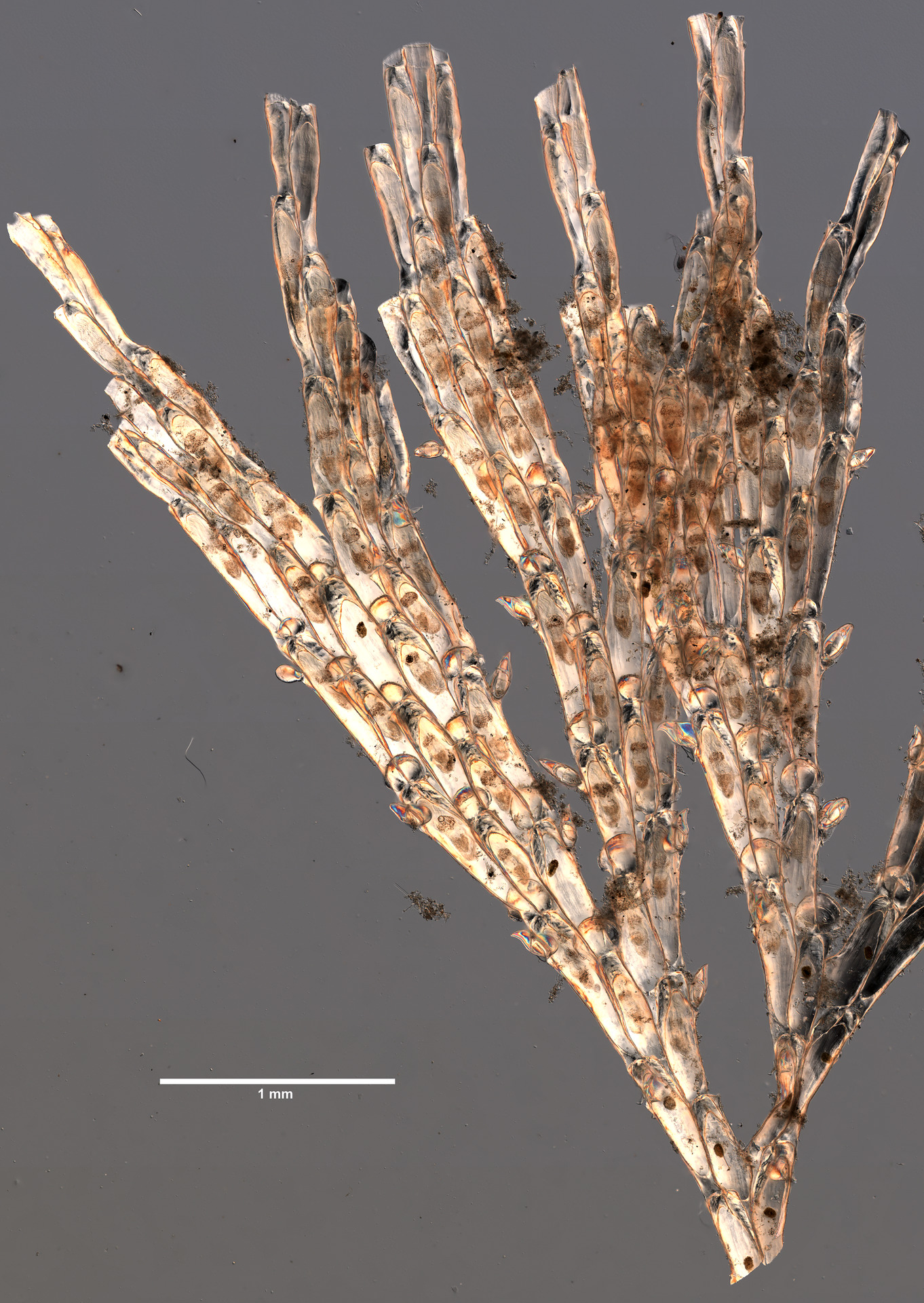

Scientific classification
- Kingdom: Animalia
- Phylum: Bryozoa
- Class: Gymnolaemata
- Order: Cheilostomatida
- Family: Bugulidae
- Genus: Bugulina
- Species: B. flabellata

Binomial name
- Bugulina flabellata (Thompson in Gray, 1848)

Synonyms
- Avicularia flabellata Gray, 1848; Bugula flabellata (Thompson in Gray, 1848)

= Bugulina flabellata =

Marine invertebrate

Bugulina flabellata is a species of bryozoan belonging to the family Bugulidae. It is found in shallow water in the northeastern Atlantic Ocean and the Mediterranean Sea.

== Description ==
Bugulina flabellata is a colonial bryozoan forming small clumps up to 5 cm (2 in) high with a characteristic cone or fan-shape. The fronds have up to eight dichotomous branches with square tips. Each zooid bears two or three short spines. Colonies are dark buff when living and greyish when dried up.

== Distribution and habitat ==
Bugulina flabellata has a wide distribution in shallow temperate waters in the northeastern Atlantic Ocean, the North Sea and the Mediterranean Sea. It has also been recorded off the coasts of Brazil, Mauritius and Australia. It grows on rock surfaces or the undersides of boulders, on stones and on shells, at depths down to about 300 m (1,000 ft).

== Ecology ==
Colonies of bryozoans grow by budding from a single zooid known as an ancestrula. Bugulina flabellata overwinters as a dormant holdfast or an ancestrula. In spring new fronds develop and there are two generations of ephemeral fronds during the summer and autumn. Bugulina flabellata is a protogynous hermaphrodite, that is, each zooid starts life as a female but later becomes a male. Embryos start to be produced soon after the individual zooids form, and there may be several stages of embryo present in the colony at any one time. Sperm is emitted through pores in the tips of the tentacles and is drawn into the recipient zooids by the feeding tentacles. The developing embryos are brooded in a brood pouch; when expelled into the sea in due course, they have a short larval life and do not disperse far. Bugulina flabellata seems specially adapted to grow and reproduce fast during the period in summer when there is an abundance of phytoplankton.

Bugulina flabellata is one of the species that form a bryozoan "turf", along with Bicellariella ciliata and Bugulina turbinata, on steep or vertical, moderately wave-exposed rock, round the coasts of Britain just below the littoral zone; this habitat tends to be dominated by aggregations of the jewel anemone Corynactis viridis and the cup coral Caryophyllia smithii.
