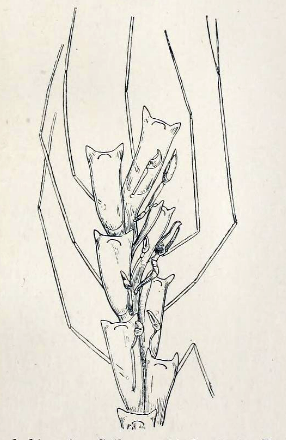
- Camptoplites bicornis

Scientific classification
- Kingdom: Animalia
- Phylum: Bryozoa
- Class: Gymnolaemata
- Order: Cheilostomatida
- Family: Bugulidae
- Genus: Camptoplites; Harmer, 1923

Synonyms
- Camptolites

= Camptoplites =

Genus of bryozoans

Camptoplites is a genus of bryozoans belonging to the family Bugulidae.

The species of this genus are found in almost all oceans of the world.

== Species ==
The following species are recognised in the genus Camptoplites:

- Camptoplites abyssicolus (Kluge, 1914)
- Camptoplites angustus (Kluge, 1914)
- Camptoplites antarcticus Liu & Hu, 1991
- Camptoplites areolatus (Kluge, 1914)
- Camptoplites asymmetricus Hastings, 1943
- Camptoplites atlanticus Hastings, 1943
- Camptoplites bicornis (Busk, 1884)
- Camptoplites diaphanus Gontar, 2002
- Camptoplites elatior (Kluge, 1914)
- Camptoplites giganteus (Kluge, 1914)
- Camptoplites infundibulum Grischenko, Gordon & Melnik, 2024
- Camptoplites latus (Kluge, 1914)
- Camptoplites lewaldi (Kluge, 1914)
- Camptoplites lunatus Harmer, 1926
- Camptoplites lutaudae d'Hondt, 1975
- Camptoplites marchemarchadi Redier & d'Hondt, 1976
- Camptoplites multispinosus (Kluge, 1914)
- Camptoplites multispinosus David & Pouyet, 1986
- Camptoplites notoscolophorus Liu & Hu, 1991
- Camptoplites phantom Grischenko, Gordon & Melnik, 2024
- Camptoplites rectilinearis Hastings, 1943
- Camptoplites reticulatus (Busk, 1884)
- Camptoplites retiformis (Kluge, 1914)
- Camptoplites tela Grischenko, Gordon & Melnik, 2024
- Camptoplites tenuispinus Hastings, 1943
- Camptoplites tricornis (Waters, 1904)
- Camptoplites tubiferus Silén, 1941
- Camptoplites unicornis (Busk, 1884)
