= Cnidariologist =

Zoologist specializing in Cnidaria

A cnidariologist is a zoologist specializing in Cnidaria, a group of freshwater and marine aquatic invertebrates that include the sea anemones, corals, hydroids, and jellyfish.

== Examples ==
- Edward Thomas Browne (1866-1937)
- Henry Bryant Bigelow (1879-1967)
- Randolph Kirkpatrick (1863–1950)
- Kamakichi Kishinouye (1867-1929)
- Paul Lassenius Kramp (1887-1975)
- Alfred G. Mayer (1868-1922)
- Lisa-Ann Gershwin (1992 - Present)

== See also ==
- Marine zoologists
- Cnidaria
