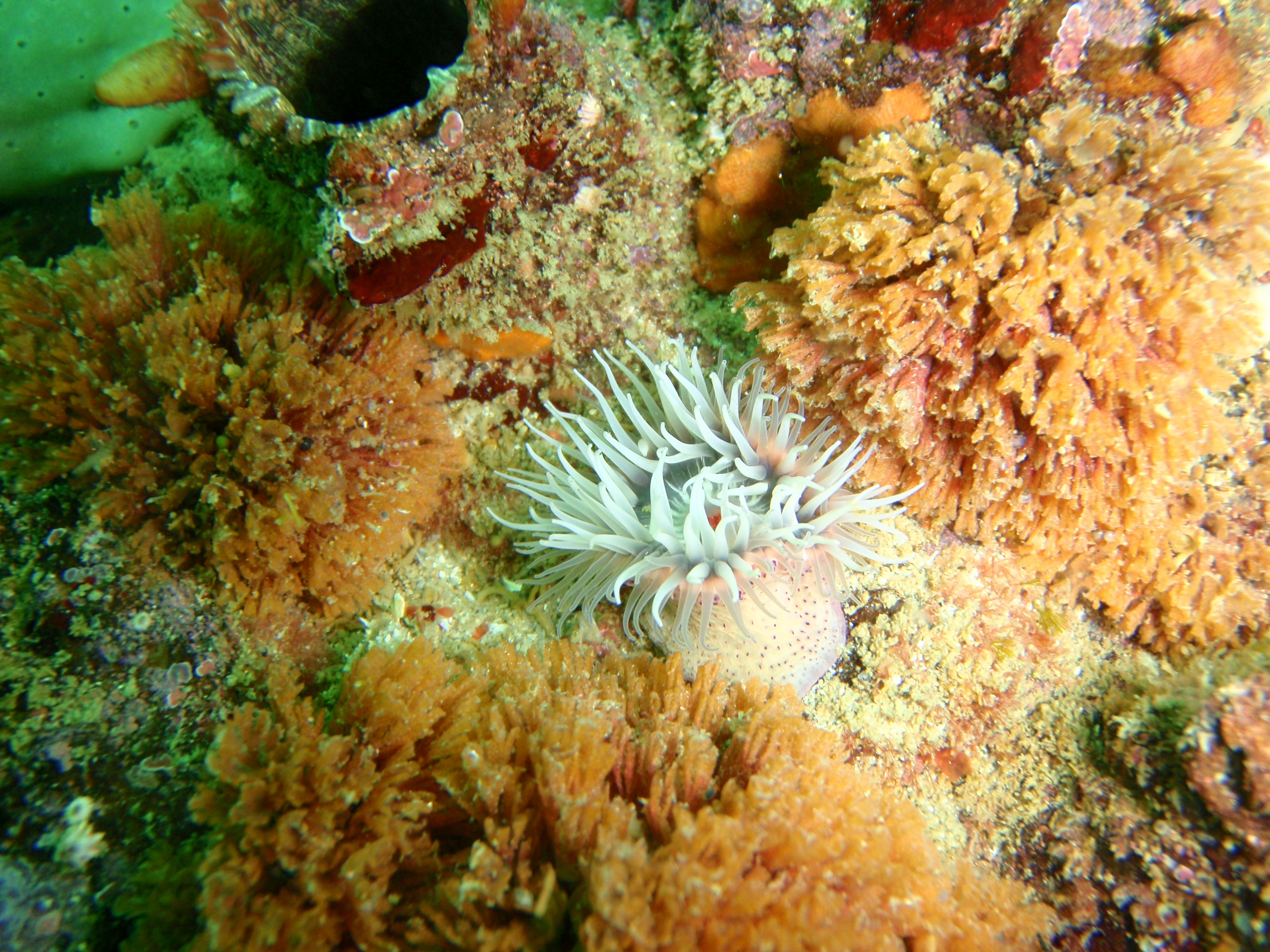
- Bicellariella ciliata

Scientific classification
- Kingdom: Animalia
- Phylum: Bryozoa
- Class: Gymnolaemata
- Order: Cheilostomatida
- Family: Bugulidae
- Genus: Bicellariella; Levinsen, 1909

Synonyms
- Bicellaria de Blainville, 1830

= Bicellariella =

Genus of bryozoans

Bicellariella is a genus of bryozoans belonging to the family Bugulidae.

The genus has a cosmopolitan distribution.

== Species ==
The following species are recognised in the genus Bicellariella:

- Bicellariella bonsai Florence, Hayward & Gibbons, 2007
- Bicellariella brevispina (O'Donoghue & O'Donoghue, 1923)
- Bicellariella chuakensis (Waters, 1913)
- Bicellariella ciliata (Linnaeus, 1758)
- Bicellariella cookae Rao & Ganapati, 1974
- Bicellariella edentata Marcus, 1955
- Bicellariella fragilis Seo, 2009
- Bicellariella levinseni Harmer, 1926
- Bicellariella sinica Liu, 1984
- Bicellariella stolonifera O'Donoghue & O'Donoghue, 1926
- Bicellariella turbinata (MacGillivray, 1869)
