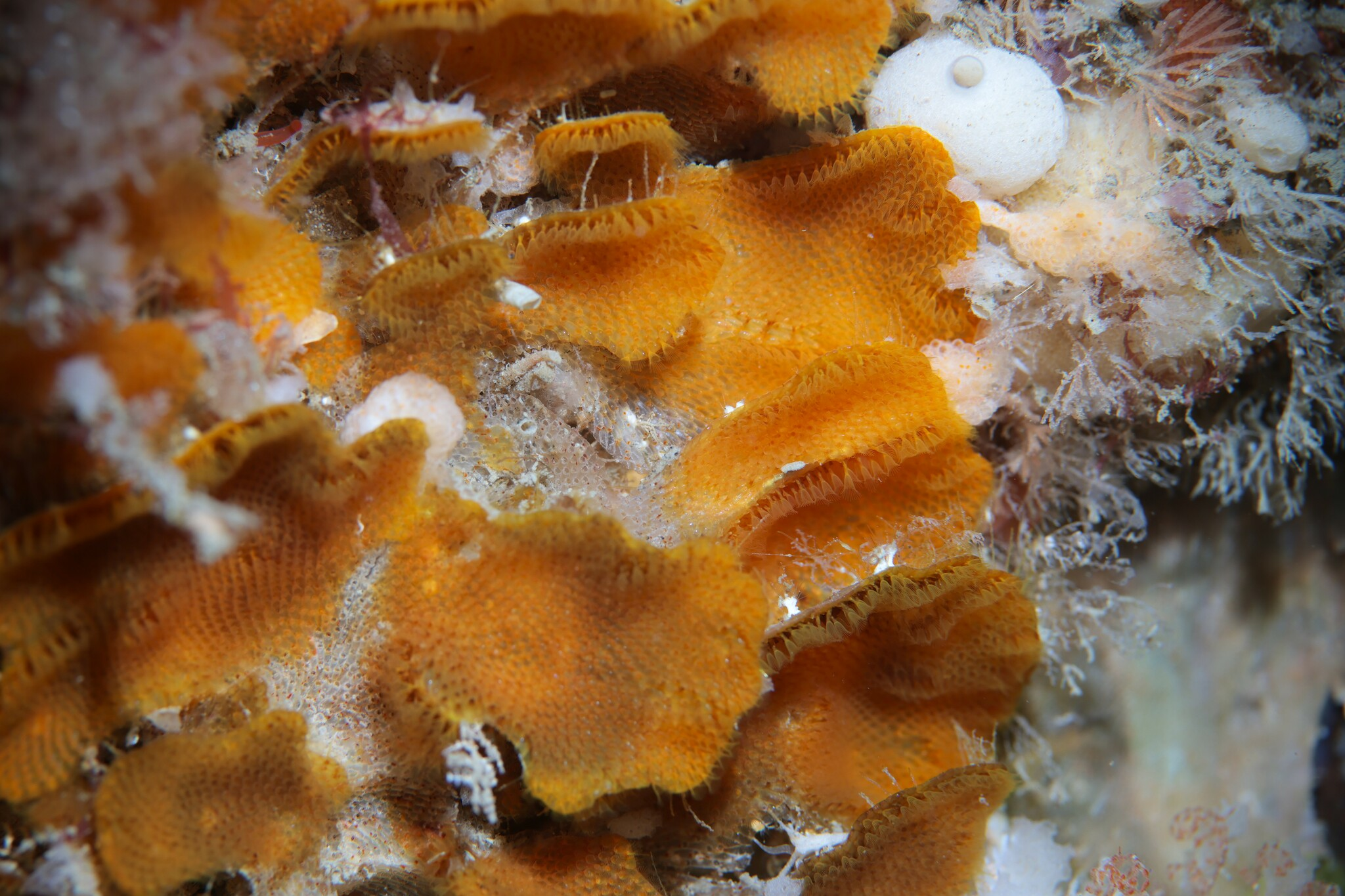
- Mucropetraliella ligulata

Scientific classification
- Domain: Eukaryota
- Kingdom: Animalia
- Phylum: Bryozoa
- Class: Gymnolaemata
- Order: Cheilostomatida
- Family: Petraliidae; Levinsen, 1909

Synonyms
- Petraliellidae Harmer, 1957

= Petraliidae =

Family of bryozoans

Petraliidae is a family of bryozoans belonging to the order Cheilostomatida.

== Genera ==
Genera:

- Mobunula Gordon, 1989
- Mucropetraliella Stach, 1936
- Orbiculipora Guha & Gopikrishna, 2005
- Peripetraliella Stach, 1936
- Petralia MacGillivray, 1869
- Riscodopa Gordon, 1989
- Sinupetraliella Stach, 1936
- Utinga Marcus, 1949
