= William Dickson Lang =

- Born: 28 September 1878
- Died: 3 March 1966 (aged 87)
- Education: Pembroke College, Cambridge
- Spouse: Georgiana Dixon
- Awards: Lyell Medal (1928); Fellow of the Royal Society (1929)
- Scientific career
- Workplaces: University of Cambridge; British Museum

William Dickson Lang (28 September 1878 – 3 March 1966) was Keeper of the Department of Geology at the British Museum from 1928 until 1938.

== Early life ==
Lang was born at Kurnal, India the second son of Edward Tickle Lang and Hebe, the daughter of John Venn Prior. At the age of 1, the family returned to England from the Punjab region of India. Lang's father was a civil servant, who had been working on the Jumna Canal in the Punjab.

== Education ==
William Lang was educated at Christ's Hospital School, then went to Harrow School in 1894 and Pembroke College, Cambridge in 1898 to read zoology. He graduated with his B.A. in 1902 and M.A. in 1905.

== Career ==
In 1902 he started as an assistant in the Geology Department of the British Museum (N.H.) in charge of Protozoa, Coelenterates, Sponges and Polyzoa (=Bryozoa). During World War I he was made curator of mosquitos and produced in 1920 "A Handbook on British mosquitos". After the war he returned to the Geology Department and in 1928 became Keeper of Geology in succession to F. A. Bather.

Lang was elected as a Fellow of the Royal Society in May 1929. His candidacy citation read: "Distinguished for his knowledge of palaeontology; has applied evolutionary principles to the systematic arrangement of fossil polyzoa and corals, studying the recapitulation of ancestral characters in the post-embryonic growth-stages of compound as well as simple organisms, e.g., 'Brit Mus Catalogue Fossil Bryozoa' (1921, 1922), 'The Pelmatoporinae'. Lang elucidated in detail the faunal and stratigraphical succession of the Lias along the Dorset coast, with special relation to ammonites. He was a proponent of the theory of orthogenesis, believing that several lineages of cribrimorph cheilostome bryozoans evolved progressively thicker and more elaborate skeletal structures which eventually became maladaptive, driving the lineage to extinction. By extending the study of existing British species of mosquitoes to their four larval stages, previously ill-known, he tested the relationships already inferred from imaginal characters.

== Later life ==
Lang mentored many students, who came to use the facilities of the British Museum (N.H.). He retired from the British Museum (N.H.) in 1938 and moved to Charmouth, Dorset, where he had holidayed from an early age. In 1940, Lang, Stanley Smith and H. Dighton Thomas published the "Index to palaeozoic coral genera". In his retirement Lang wrote several articles about Mary Anning, the fossil collector. He also published on the geology and palaeontology of the Dorset coast around Charmouth. In all, he published over 130 papers. He was president of the Dorset Natural History and Archaeological Society from 1938 to 1940 and member of its council from 1956 to 1966. He was well liked and respected, and his letters to colleagues and students, including Dorothy Hill, demonstrate the respect and affection with which he and his work was held.

== Personal life ==
Lang married Georgiana Dixon in 1908; they had a son, W. Geoffrey Lang and a daughter, J. Brenda Lang. He died in 1966 and was survived by his wife and children.
