= Randolph Kirkpatrick =

British spongiologist, cnidariologist and bryozoologist

Cover of The Nummulosphere, 1912

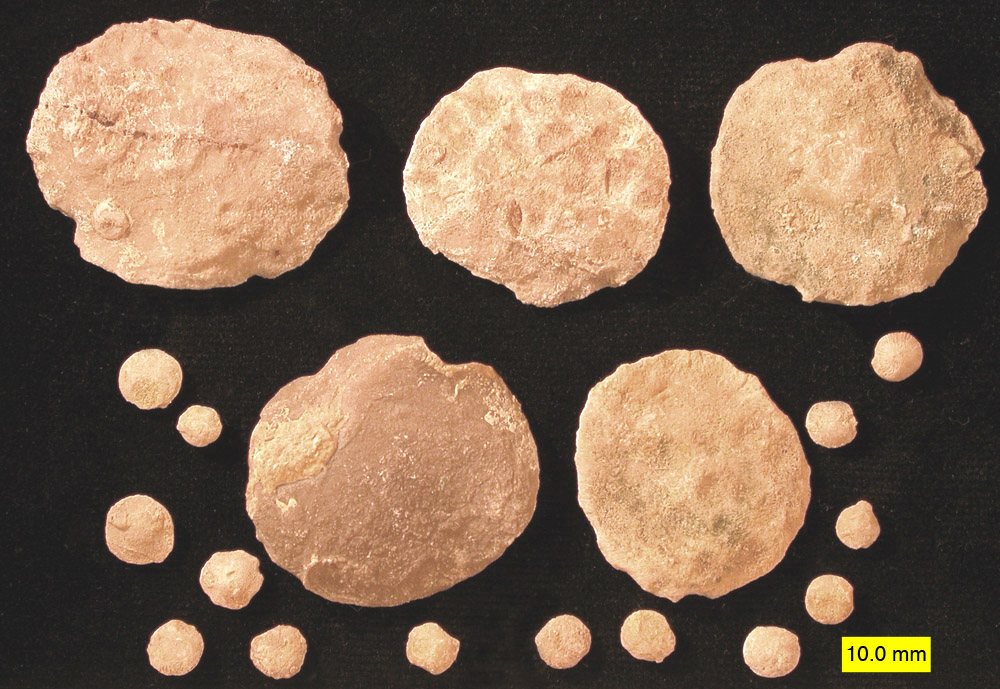
Fossil nummulitid foraminiferans; Eocene of the United Arab Emirates; scale in mm.

Randolph Kirkpatrick (1863–1950) was a British spongiologist, cnidariologist and bryozoologist. He was assistant keeper of lower invertebrates at the British Natural History Museum from 1886 until his retirement in 1927.

Kirkpatrick published a limited number of papers on the sponges of Antarctica and the Indian Ocean. However, his most significant work was carried out on Merlia, a species of coralline sponge (a sponge which secretes a coral-like limestone skeleton). He was the first to correctly interpret these unusual sponges, but his work was largely ignored until the 1960s when T. F. Goreau and his colleagues W. D. Hartman and Jeremy Jackson rediscovered the coralline sponges in the reefs of the West Indies.

It is likely that his important work on the coralline sponges was dismissed by his contemporaries due to his having published a book containing unconventional ideas about the history of life on earth. This was the self-published The Nummulosphere: an account of the Organic Origin of so-called Igneous Rocks and Abyssal Red Clays (1912), printed in four volumes by Lamley & Co. of South Kensington. Kirkpatrick's theory proposed that Earth was originally covered with water and that larger benthic foraminifera of the genus Nummulites eventually accumulated into a layer which he called 'The Nummulosphere'. He additionally proposed that all the Earth's crustal rocks were subsequently derived from this "nummulosphaeric" layer and in his books he included illustrations of supposed nummulitic textures he had observed in granites and even meteorites. In his later years he admitted that this was erroneous, and that he had been misled by "the architecture of protoplasm".
