= Stanley Smith (geologist) =

British geologist (1883–1955)

Stanley Smith (7 March 1883 – 1 July 1955) was a British geologist and academic. He was born in Middlesbrough, Yorkshire in 1883. He attended Darlington Grammar School and after completion of school, worked in a chemical laboratory of the Darlington Forge Company. He enrolled in Armstrong College (now Kings College, University of Newcastle upon Tyne), in Newcastle upon Tyne, in 1904, taking his B.Sc. in 1907, followed by M.Sc. in 1909 and D.Sc. from Cambridge in 1915. His mentor at Armstrong College was Prof. G. A. Lebour, under whose influence Smith investigated the coalfields of Northumberland and the Carboniferous limestone of the local fells. His research steadily moved into the study of Palaeozoic corals, for which he would become a world expert.

== Career ==
After taking a fellowship at Armstrong College, Smith moved to Clare College, Cambridge in 1912. He published his first paper on corals there. He then worked at Aberystwyth College, Wales from 1913 until 1920, Bedford College for Women, London (1920-1921) and Toronto College (1921-1922). Smith became assistant lecturer in geology at the University of Bristol in 1922 and eventually retired from this university in 1948. From 1913-1930, Dr Smith undertook annual vacations which would include work at the British Museum ((N.H.) now Natural History Museum), and much of this work was undertaken with Dr W.D. Lang. Smith, Lang and H. Dighton Thomas would collaborate on a volume published in 1940, "Index of Palaeozoic Coral Genera" which was much admired by coral experts. He and Lang would mentor students from Cambridge, including Dorothy Hill, who was working on her PhD at Cambridge in the 1930s. During World War II, extensive bombing of the Bristol Museum damaged a number of the collections Smith worked on. Like many academics he was prevented from continuing his research at the Natural History Museum in London, due to the emergency relocation of its collections for preservation during the War.

== Later life ==
Dr Smith was awarded the Geological Society of London's Lyell Medal in 1947. In addition to his interest in palaeontology, he also undertook research into Greek and Roman antiquities during his retirement, with D.E. Eichholz of the University of Bristol. This included a translation of the works of Theophrastus, and his geological studies. Smith was a member and secretary of the South-Western Naturalists Union and member of the Bristol Naturalists Society.

== Legacy ==
Smith died in Bristol, Gloucester, in 1955. He was survived by his wife, whom he married in 1924.

Each year, the Stanley Smith Prize, named in his honour, is awarded to the best Level 3 student in palaeontology at the University of Bristol.
