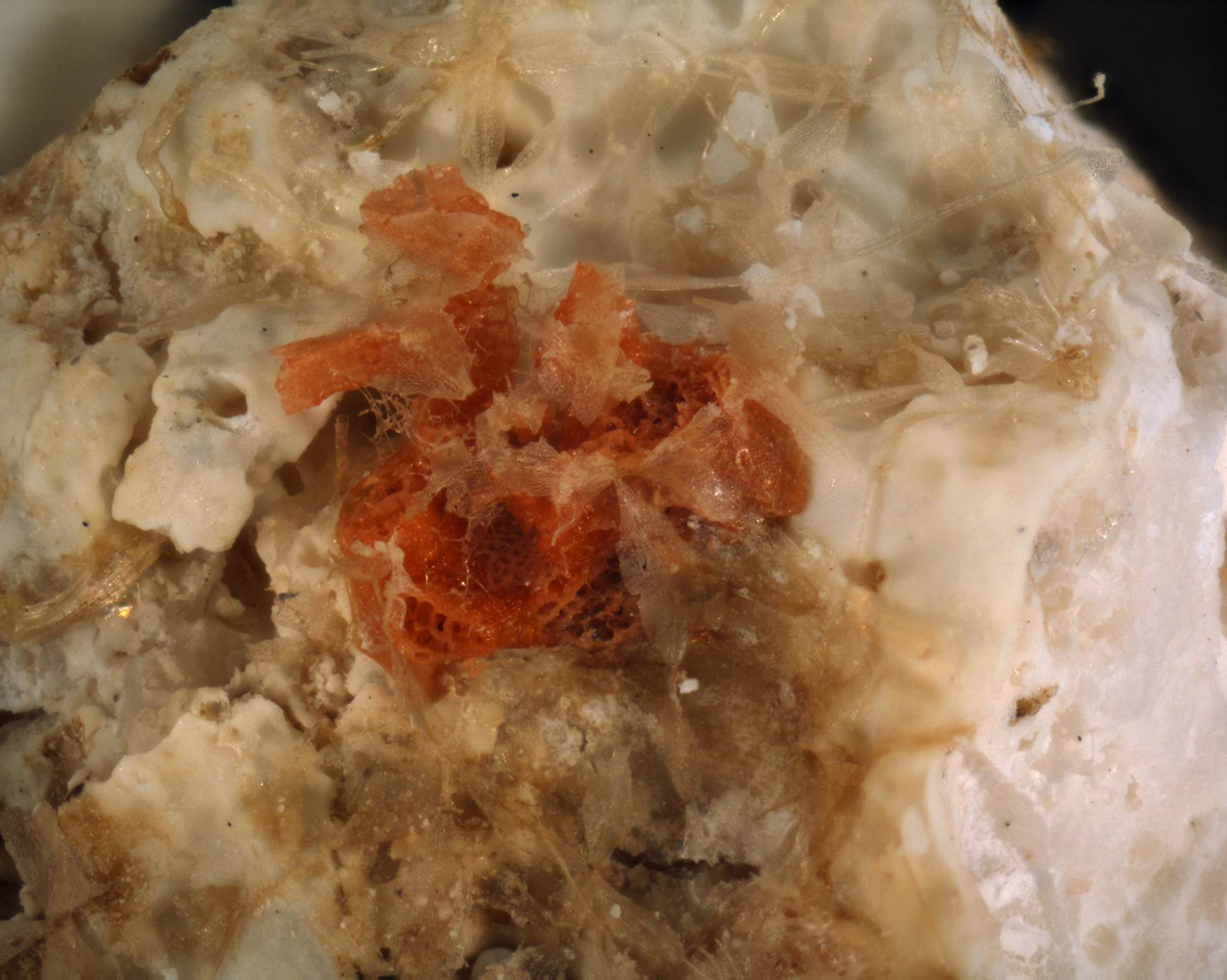

Scientific classification
- Kingdom: Animalia
- Phylum: Bryozoa
- Class: Gymnolaemata
- Order: Cheilostomatida
- Family: Chaperiidae
- Genus: Chaperia; Jullien, 1881

Synonyms
- Chaperiella Strand, 1928; Chapperia Willey, 1900

= Chaperia =

Genus of bryozoans

Chaperia is a genus of bryozoans belonging to the family Chaperiidae.

The genus has an almost cosmopolitan distribution.

== Species ==
The following species are recognised in the genus Chaperia:

- Chaperia acanthina (Lamouroux, 1825)
- Chaperia albispina (MacGillivray, 1882)
- Chaperia atypica Boonzaaier-Davids, Ma & McQuaid, 2023
- Chaperia australis Jullien, 1881
- †Chaperia barretoi Brown, 1952
- Chaperia brasiliensis Vieira, Gordon, Souza & Haddad, 2010
- Chaperia capensis (Busk, 1884)
- Chaperia ciliata (MacGillivray, 1869)
- Chaperia granulosa Gordon, 1986
- Chaperia infundibulata d'Hondt, 1988
- Chaperia judex (Kirkpatrick, 1888)
- †Chaperia laticella Canu, 1908
- †Chaperia maorica (Stoliczka, 1865)
- Chaperia multispinosa Gordon, 1984
- †Chaperia parva Brown, 1952
- Chaperia patula (Hincks, 1881)
- Chaperia polygonia Kluge, 1914
- †Chaperia robusta Di Martino, Rosso & Taylor, 2025
- Chaperia semiaperta (Reuss, 1874) †
- Chaperia septispina Florence, Hayward & Gibbons, 2007
- Chaperia setigera (Hincks, 1881)
- †Chaperia spatulata (Waters, 1881)
- Chaperia taylori Ramalho & Calliari, 2015
- Chaperia varians (O'Donoghue & O'Donoghue, 1923)
