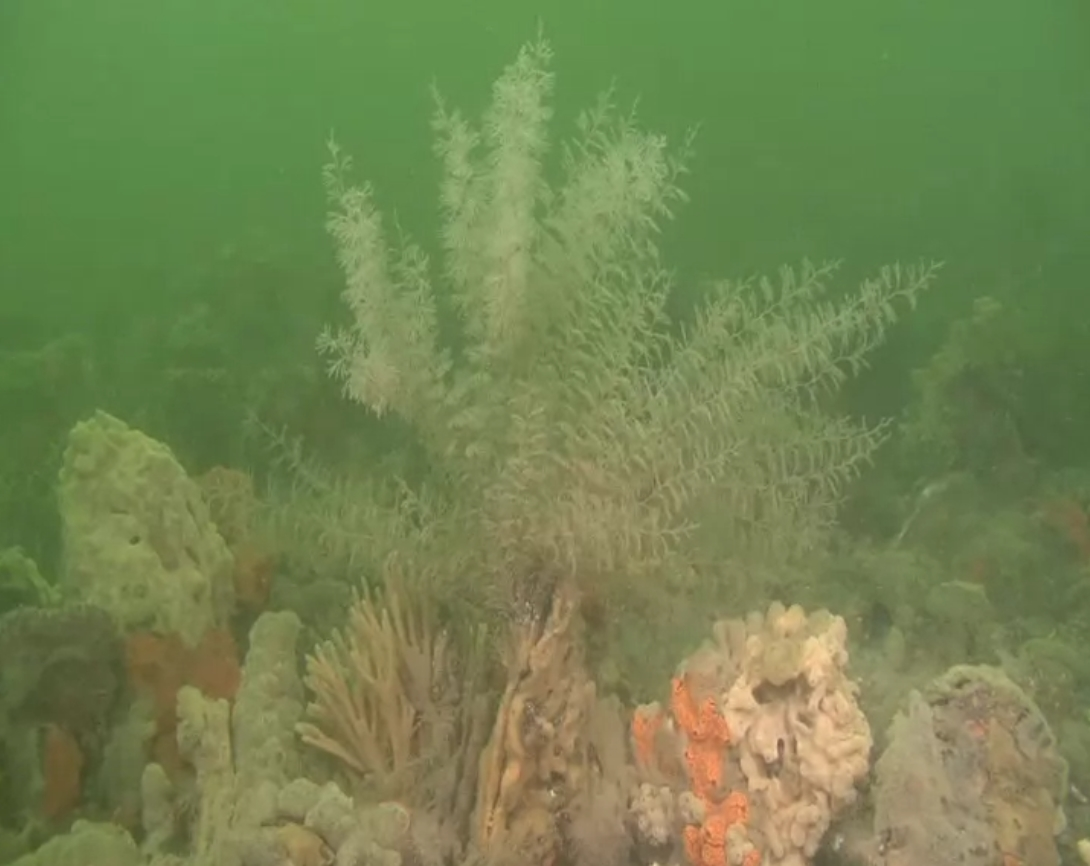
- In the Netherlands

Scientific classification
- Kingdom: Animalia
- Phylum: Bryozoa
- Class: Gymnolaemata
- Order: Cheilostomatida
- Family: Bugulidae
- Genus: Crisularia
- Species: C. plumosa

Binomial name
- Crisularia plumosa (Pallas, 1766)

Synonyms
- Bugula plumosa (Pallas, 1766); Cellularia plumosa Pallas, 1766; Crisia plumosa; Sertularia fastigiata Linnaeus, 1758

= Crisularia plumosa =

Colonial aquatic invertebrate

Crisularia plumosa is a species of bryozoan belonging to the family Bugulidae, commonly known as the feather bryozoan. It is native to the Atlantic Ocean.

== Description ==
Crisularia plumosa is a colonial bryozoan that forms small bushy clumps, up to 10 cm (4 in) high, which are attached to the substrate by a tangled ball of rhizoids. The founding zooid is circular and spineless. As it buds and develops into a colony, a robust central trunk is formed, and branches grow out dichotomously from this in a characteristic spiral fashion, each with fine feathery branchlets. The colony is whitish, or pale tan. The individual zooids are microscopic, about 0.5 by 0.2 mm (0.02 by 0.01 in) and form two calcified rows on each branchlet; some of the smallest zooids are avicularia, each able to use its mandible and hooked beak to catch prey, which is then passed to the somewhat larger neighbouring autozooids.

== Distribution and habitat ==
Crisularia plumosa is native to the northeastern Atlantic Ocean, its range extending from the North Sea and the coasts of the British Isles and Ireland, to the Iberian Peninsula and Madeira; it is found sparingly in the Mediterranean Sea. It grows on rocky coasts with limited water movement, and on piers and jetties, and tolerates high levels of sediment in the water. It occurs at depths down to about 50 m (160 ft). Also recorded from the Cape Peninsula in South Africa.

== Ecology ==
Crisularia plumosa is a filter feeder; the tentacles on the lophophore create a current that wafts diatoms, bacteria and other small organic particles within reach, and these are conveyed to the mouth. This species is a protandrous hermaphrodite and colonies have both male and female zooids; each individual zooid starts its existence as a male and later becomes a female. Sperm, liberated into the water column by male zooids, is drawn into female zooids where fertilisation takes place; the embryos are retained in a brood chamber. The larvae have a short planktonic phase before settling on the substrate and undergoing metamorphosis. Other animals, such as small sea spiders, sometimes take shelter among the branchlets of the clumps. Alongside Flustra foliacea, this species forms part of a dense bryozoan "turf" that is found on heavily silted but moderately wave-exposed rocks and boulders round certain coasts of Britain just below the littoral zone; the habitat is dominated by sponges Suberites ficus, Suberites carnosus and Hymeniacidon perlevis.
