= Caulibugula =

Scientific classification
- Kingdom: Animalia
- Phylum: Bryozoa
- Class: Gymnolaemata
- Order: Cheilostomatida
- Family: Bugulidae
- Genus: Caulibugula; Verrill, 1900

Synonyms
- Stirparia Goldstein, 1880; Stirpariella Harmer, 1923

Genus of bryozoans

Caulibugula is a genus of bryozoans belonging to the family Bugulidae.

The genus has an almost cosmopolitan distribution.

== Species ==
The following species are recognised in the genus Caulibugula:

- Caulibugula annulata (Maplestone, 1879)
- Caulibugula arcasounensis De Blauwe, 2005
- Caulibugula armata Verrill, 1900
- Caulibugula aspinosa Mawatari, 1956
- Caulibugula binata Liu, 1985
- Caulibugula bocki Silén, 1941
- Caulibugula caliculata (Levinsen, 1909)
- Caulibugula californica Robertson, 1905
- Caulibugula ciliata (Robertson, 1905)
- Caulibugula ciliatoidea Liu, 1990
- Caulibugula dendrograpta (Waters, 1913)
- Caulibugula exilis (MacGillivray, 1890)
- Caulibugula glabra (Hincks, 1883)
- Caulibugula gracilenta Liu, 1985
- Caulibugula haddoni (Kirkpatrick, 1890)
- Caulibugula hainanica Liu, 1984
- Caulibugula hastingsae Marcus, 1941
- Caulibugula inermis Harmer, 1926
- Caulibugula irregularis Liu, 1985
- Caulibugula levinseni Osburn, 1940
- Caulibugula longiconica Liu, 1985
- Caulibugula longirostrata Liu, 1985
- Caulibugula lunga Tilbrook, 2006
- Caulibugula mortenseni (Marcus, 1925)
- Caulibugula occidentalis (Robertson, 1905)
- Caulibugula pearsei Maturo, 1966
- Caulibugula separata Harmer, 1926
- Caulibugula sinica Liu, 1985
- Caulibugula tuberosa Hastings, 1939
- Caulibugula zanzibariensis (Waters, 1913)
