= Bugulina (bryozoan) =

Scientific classification
- Kingdom: Animalia
- Phylum: Bryozoa
- Class: Gymnolaemata
- Order: Cheilostomatida
- Family: Bugulidae
- Genus: Bugulina; Gray, 1848

Type species
- Sertularia avicularia Linnaeus, 1758

Species
- See text.

Synonyms
- Avicularia Gray, 1848; Ornithopora d'Orbigny, 1852; Ornithoporina d'Orbigny, 1852

Genus of bryozoans

Bugulina is a genus of bryozoans in the family Bugulidae.

== Species ==
As of July 2021, the World List of Bryozoa accepted the following species:

- Bugulina angustiloba (Lamarck, 1816)
- Bugulina aquilirostris (Ryland, 1960)
- Bugulina avicularia (Linnaeus, 1758)
- Bugulina borealis (Packard, 1863)
- Bugulina calathus (Norman, 1868)
- Bugulina californica (Robertson, 1905)
- Bugulina carvalhoi (Marcus, 1949)
- Bugulina ditrupae (Busk, 1858)
- Bugulina eburnea (Calvet, 1906)
- Bugulina flabellata (Thompson in Gray, 1848)
- Bugulina foliolata (Vieira, Winston & Fehlauer-Ale, 2012)
- Bugulina fulva (Ryland, 1960)
- Bugulina hummelincki (Fransen, 1986)
- Bugulina longirostrata (Robertson, 1905)
- Bugulina multiserialis (d'Orbigny, 1841)
- Bugulina pedata (Harmer, 1926)
- Bugulina pugeti (Robertson, 1905)
- Bugulina simplex (Hincks, 1886)
- Bugulina spicata (Hincks, 1886)
- Bugulina stolonifera (Ryland, 1960)
- Bugulina tricuspis (Kluge, 1955)
- Bugulina turbinata (Alder, 1857)
