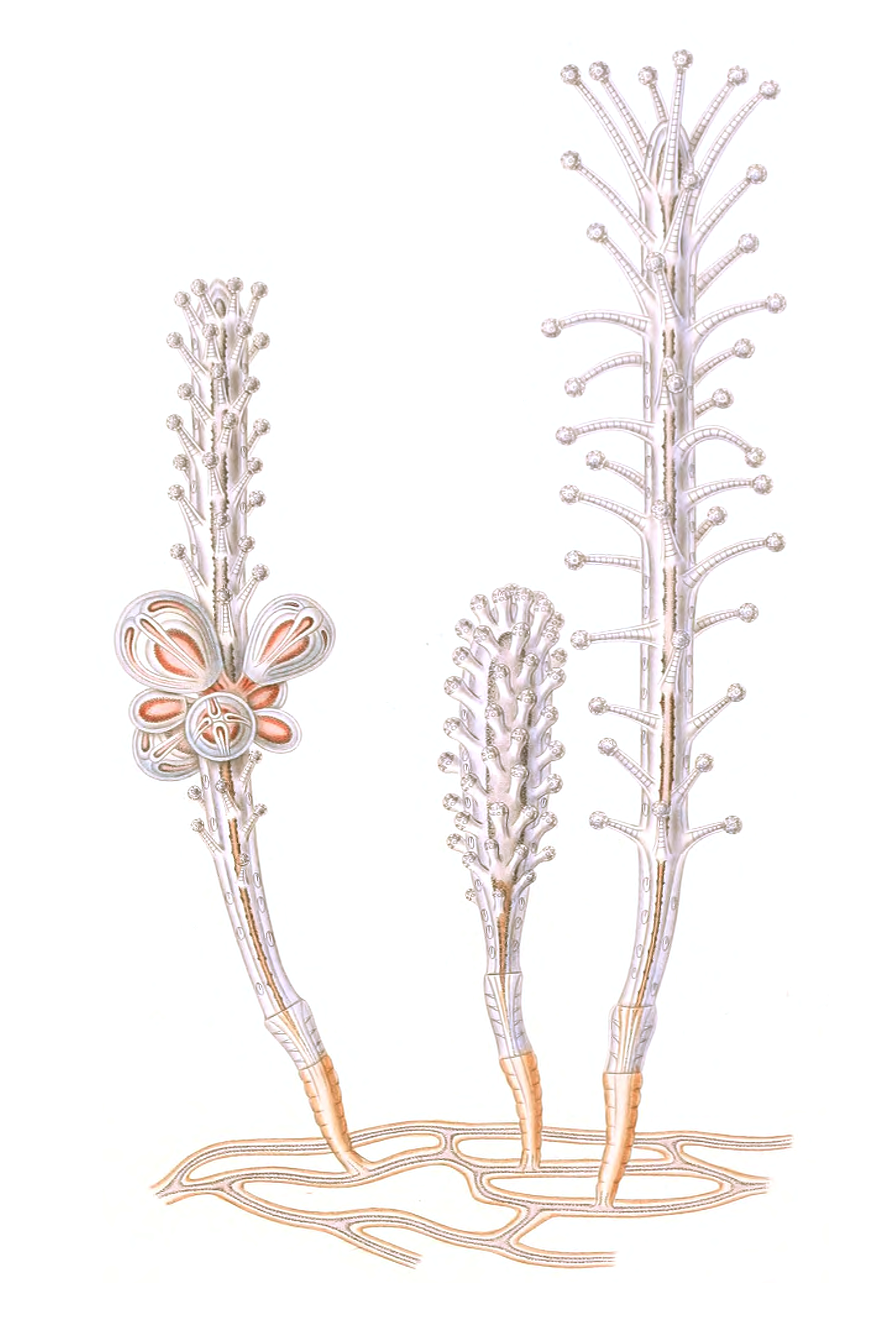
- Zanclea implexa

Scientific classification
- Kingdom: Animalia
- Phylum: Cnidaria
- Class: Hydrozoa
- Order: Anthoathecata
- Family: Zancleidae
- Genus: Zanclea; Gegenbaur, 1856

= Zanclea =

Genus of cnidarians

Zanclea is a genus of hydrozoans belonging to the family Zancleidae.

The genus has cosmopolitan distribution.

== Species ==
Species:

- Zanclea alba (Meyen, 1834)
- Zanclea apicata Xu, Huang & Guo, 2008
- Zanclea apophysis Xu, Huang & Guo, 2008
- Zanclea baudini Gershwin & Zeidler, 2003
- Zanclea bomala Boero, Bouillon & Gravili, 2000
- Zanclea carinata Gershwin & Zeidler, 2003
- Zanclea cladophora (Agassiz A., 1865)
- Zanclea costata Gegenbaur, 1857
- Zanclea cubensis Varela, 2012
- Zanclea cylindrica (Kirkpatrick, 1890)
- Zanclea divergens Boero, Bouillon & Gravili, 2000
- Zanclea dubia Kramp, 1959
- Zanclea eilatensis Pica, Bastari & Puce, 2017
- Zanclea exposita Puce, Cerrano, Boyer, Ferretti & Bavestrello, 2002
- Zanclea fanella Boero, Bouillon & Gravili, 2000
- Zanclea gallii Montano, Maggioni & Puce, 2015
- Zanclea gemmosa McCrady, 1859
- Zanclea giancarloi Boero, Bouillon & Gravili, 2000
- Zanclea gilii Boero, Bouillon & Gravili, 2000
- Zanclea hicksoni (Stepanjants, 1972)
- Zanclea hirohitoi Boero, Bouillon & Gravili, 2000
- Zanclea implexa (Alder, 1856)
- Zanclea indica Mammen, 1963
- Zanclea indopacifica (Stechow, 1919)
- Zanclea macrocystae (Xu, Huang & Chen, 1991)
- Zanclea margarita Panthos & Bythell, 2010
- Zanclea medusopolypata Boero, Bouillon & Gravili, 2000
- Zanclea migottoi Galea, 2008
- Zanclea ngeriana Gershwin & Zeidler, 2003
- Zanclea nitida (Hartlaub, 1905)
- Zanclea parasitica Krohn, 1853
- Zanclea polymorpha Schuchert, 1996
- Zanclea prolifera Uchida & Sugiura, 1976
- Zanclea protecta Hastings, 1932
- Zanclea retractilis Boero, Bouillon & Gravili, 2000
- Zanclea sagittaria (Haeckel, 1879)
- Zanclea sango Hirose & Hirose, 2011
- Zanclea sardii Gershwin & Zeidler, 2003
- Zanclea sessilis (Gosse, 1853)
- Zanclea spiralis (A. Agassiz, 1862)
- Zanclea tipis Puce, Cerrano, Boyer, Ferretti & Bavestrello, 2002
