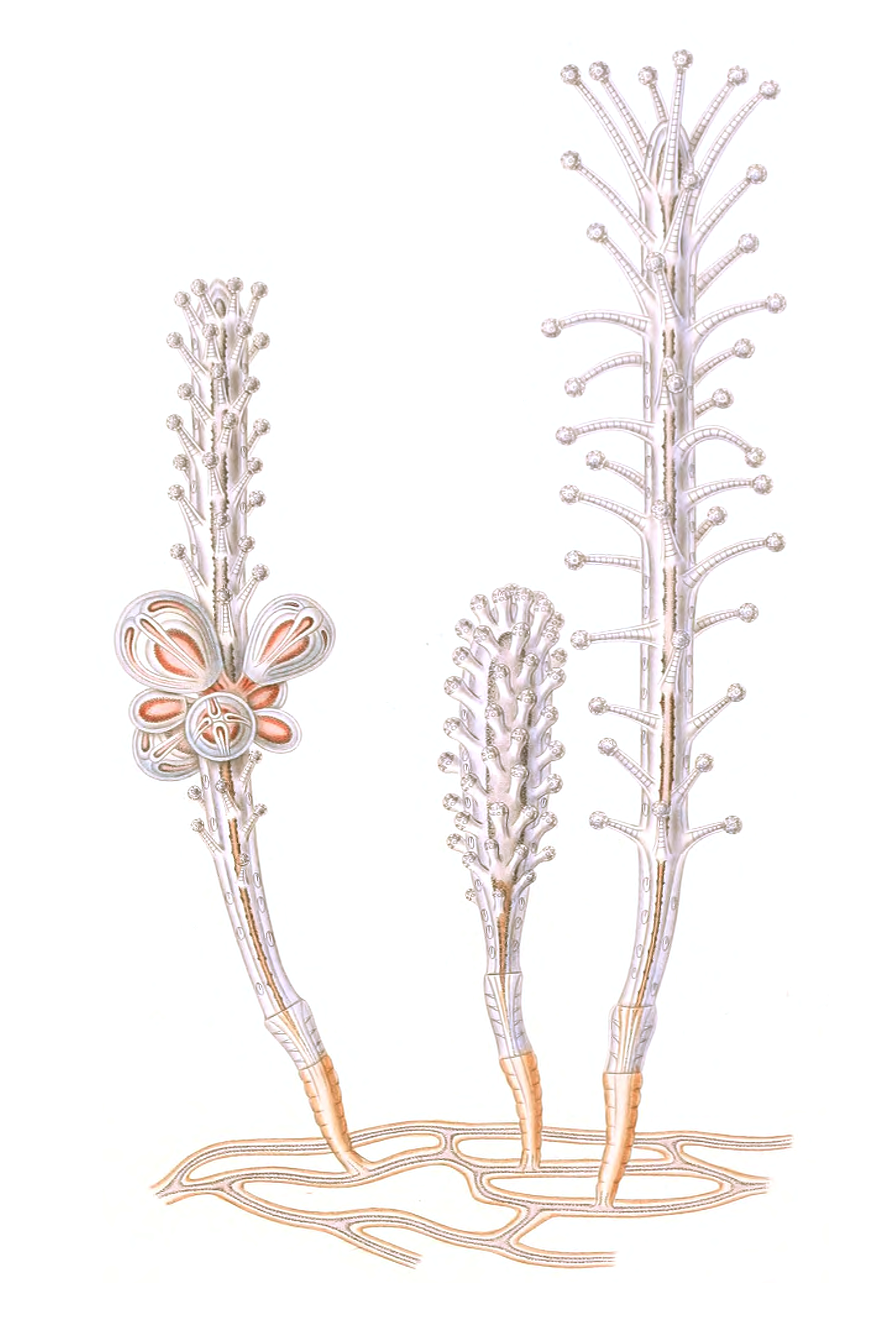
- Zanclea implexa

Scientific classification
- Kingdom: Animalia
- Phylum: Cnidaria
- Class: Hydrozoa
- Order: Anthoathecata
- Family: Zancleidae; Russell, 1953

= Zancleidae =

Family of cnidarians

Zancleidae is a family of cnidarians belonging to the order Anthoathecata.

Genera:

- Ctenaria Haeckel, 1879
- Halocoryne Hadzi, 1917
- Oonautes Damas, 1937
- Zanclea Gegenbaur, 1856
- Zanclella Boero & Hewitt, 1992

== Defining characteristics ==
Zancleidae is a family of hydrozoans from the order Anthoathecata. Hydrozoans are a class from the phylum Cnidaria, which include jellyfish, sea anemones, and other invertebrates. Cnidarians are defined by their two distinct tissue layers and radial symmetry. These characteristics distinguish them from invertebrates of the clade bilateria, which possess bilateral symmetry in their adult or larval forms. Hydrozoans can be colonial or solitary organisms and are often very small on their own. Zancleidae polyps are arranged in colonies and range from 700-750 um in their medusa stage. Currently, there are three main genera described as, Zanclea Gegenbaur, Halocoryne Hadzi, and Zanclella Boero & Hewitt. Within these three genera, there are around 42 accepted species. Zancleids have a complicated taxonomic history, and new species are discovered fairly often due to a better understanding of the range of variation between organisms of this family.

== Anatomy and morphology ==
Zancleidae are colonial organisms that live in symbiosis with other benthic invertebrates. They are most commonly seen in association with cheilostomata bryozoa. Other species display a preference toward different organisms, such as bivalves, corals, and algae. Some scientists believe that they serve as protection for their choice host organism, but others argue that their relationship can be parasitic. The colonies of zancleids are separated into small polyps, which arise from asexual reproduction. Most species only have monomorphic polyps, designed for protection and feeding, but some other species have both gastrozooids and dactylozooids, which specialize in different roles. Zancleidae attaches to the surface of their host by a thin root-like structure called a hydrorhiza. These organisms are stolons and are often found embedded into the skeleton of whatever organism they prefer to live with. The polyps have a white-ish clear coloring and appear orange in some parts. Just like all cnidaria, their tentacles are lined with cnidophores, that house harpoon-like stinging cells called nematocysts. These tentacles are used as a defense for both themselves and their host. All of the species experience polyp and medusa stages, which vary in length depending on the species and other external factors. Gastrozooids are responsible for producing and releasing the medusa buds. The medusae are spherical and sometimes appear greenish. These miniature jellyfish-like organisms can have either zero, two, or four tentacles depending on the species. It is theorized that their number of tentacles can be tied to their relationship with their host organism. During the medusa stage, the zancleids feed on small organisms in their proximity, and eggs are released into the water column. These eggs will then be fertilized and will help to facilitate the growth of new colonies.

== Ecological role ==
Gastrozooids specialize as the feeding mechanism within the zancleidae colonies. They are said to feed on the bryozoan lophophore and also zooplankton from the surrounding water. The bryozoans, on the other hand, feed on phytoplankton, so there is no competition between the species. In the medusa stage, the zancleids have been observed catching prey that they encountered by chance. The prey would then be immobilized by the tentacles and moved into the mouth cavity of the organism. For colonies that prefer to live in association with corals, their presence in the community plays a role in the functionality of their surrounding ecosystem.

== Distribution ==
Zancleidae has a wide-ranging distribution and has been discovered in a number of different places in the world's oceans. Many studies focusing on these organisms examined ones living in the Maldives and the Red Sea, but they have also been identified in the Indian ocean and throughout the Pacific. Since their distribution underwater is connected to that of their hosts, they are found primarily in benthic environments. Some are also said to only appear in conjunction with their host when that organism has grown to a certain size. In terms of distribution within the benthic environment, bryozoans, the most common host for zancleids, have been seen to express a preference for shaded habitats in the intertidal or infralittoral zones.

== Taxonomic history ==
The phylogenetic origins of zancleidae are fairly unclear due to the lack of research. Very few studies have focused on compiling the DNA sequences of the different species, and it has also been difficult for scientists to find viable, fertile colonies to conduct their research on. These factors severely limit the amount of work that can be done in relation to the classification of these organisms. It is accepted though, that convergent evolution with their hosts has driven speciation among the zancleidae family. Many of these species have seen a large reduction in their polyp and medusa stages over the years, which helps support the theories of speciation. It is also clear that differing numbers of tentacles distinguish species from each other, along with the presence of dactylozooids within the colonies. The preference of host organism is another defining characteristic that is used as a means for classification between species.
