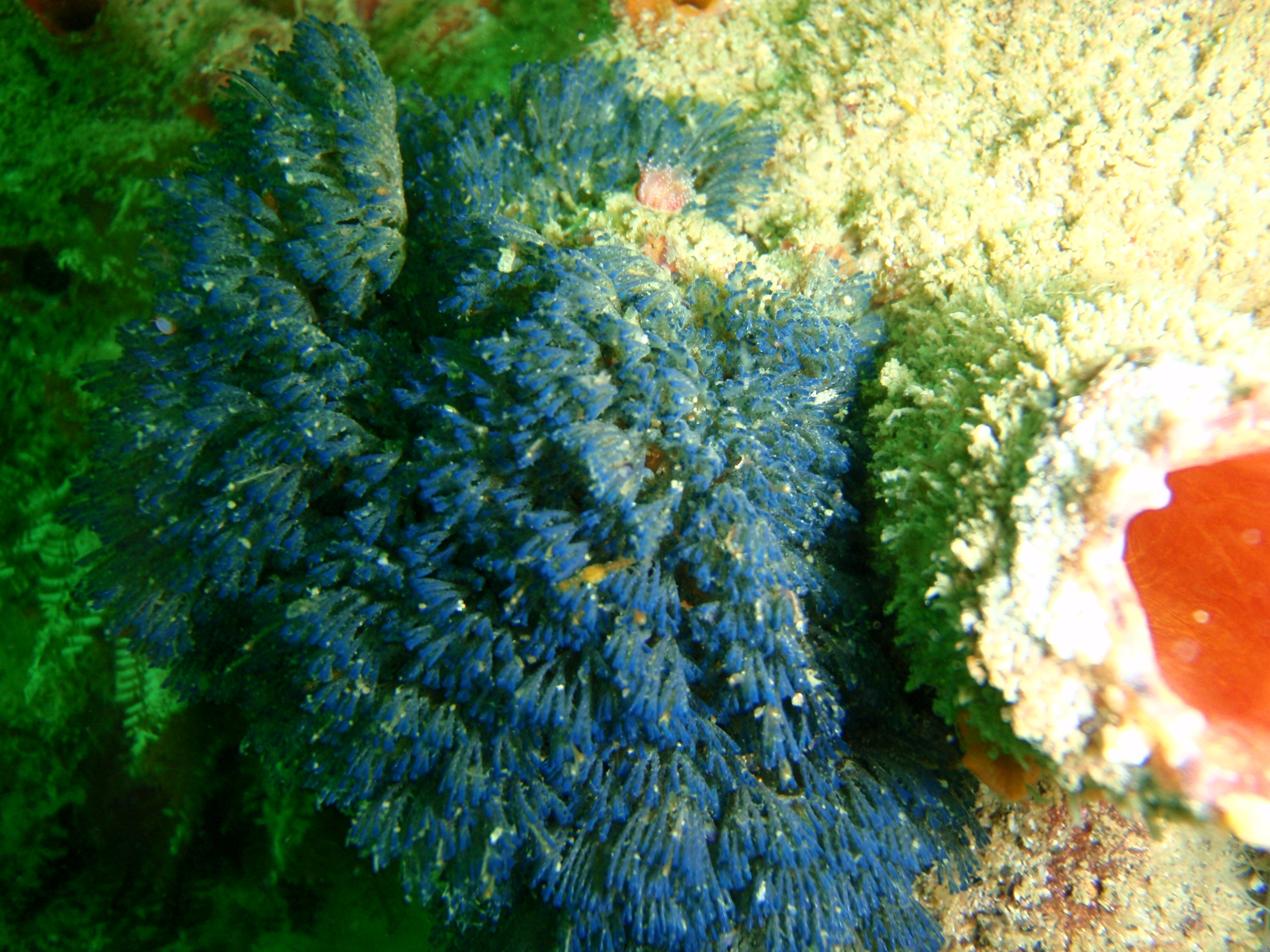

Scientific classification
- Kingdom: Animalia
- Phylum: Bryozoa
- Class: Gymnolaemata
- Order: Cheilostomatida
- Family: Bugulidae
- Genus: Virididentula; Fehlauer-Ale, Winston, Tilbrook, Nascimento & Vieira, 2015
- Species: V. dentata

Binomial name
- Virididentula dentata (Lamouroux, 1816)

= Virididentula =

Virididentula dentata

Genus of bryozoans

Virididentula is a monotypic genus of bryozoans belonging to the family Bugulidae. The only species is Virididentula dentata.

The species is found in almost all the world's oceans.
