= Raymond Carroll Osburn =

American zoologist

- Born: January 4, 1872
- Died: August 6, 1955 (aged 83)
- Education: Ohio State University; Columbia University
- Awards: Daniel Giraud Elliot Medal (1950)
- Scientific career
- Fields: Zoology
- Workplaces: Starling Medical College; Fargo College; New York High School of Commerce; Barnard College; Ohio State University; University of Southern California

Raymond Carroll Osburn (January 4, 1872 – August 6, 1955) was an American zoologist.

== Biography ==
Osburn was born on January 4, 1872, in Newark, Ohio. In 1898, he received his bachelor's degree from the Ohio State University, and continued there, earning his master's two years later. He received his Ph.D. in 1906 from Columbia University. After he got the master's degree, he got a position as instructor of biology and embryology at Starling Medical College. From 1899 to 1902 he was a professor of biology at Fargo College. From 1902 to 1906, he taught at New York High School of Commerce. From 1907 to 1910 he was assistant professor of zoology, following by professor of biology for five years at Barnard College. For two years he served under the same title at Connecticut College for Women, and was a professor of zoology and entomology department chairman at Ohio State University. One of his PhD students was Mary Dora Rogick who became a specialist in the taxonomy and ecology of bryozoa, a phylum of aquatic invertebrate animals.

He was an associate director of the New York Aquarium and a summer director of the Franz Theodore Stone Laboratory of Ohio State University. From 1945 to 1952 he was a research associate on bryozoa at the Allan Hancock Foundation of the University of Southern California. He died August 6, 1955, in Columbus, Ohio.

== Works ==
He was the author of two books:

- The Care of Home Aquaria
- 1950 — Bryozoa of the Pacific coast of America
