= Mary Dora Rogick =

Zoologist, botanical illustrator

- Born: October 7, 1906; East Sandy, Pennsylvania
- Died: October 26, 1964 (aged 58); New Rochelle, New York
- Education: A.B., 1929 and A.M., 1930, University of Omaha and the University of Nebraska; PhD, 1934, Ohio State University
- Known for: Specialist in the taxonomy and ecology of bryozoa
- Scientific career
- Fields: Zoologist, botanical illustrator
- Workplaces: College of New Rochelle
- Doctoral advisor: Raymond C. Osburn

Mary Dora Rogick (October 7, 1906 – October 26, 1964) was an American zoologist. In 1935 she joined the College of New Rochelle in New York, where she spent her career as a professor and researcher. She was a specialist in the taxonomy and ecology of bryozoa, a phylum of aquatic invertebrate animals.

== Family life ==
Rogick was born in East Sandy, Pennsylvania, on October 7, 1906, to Nicholas and Sara Rogic, immigrants from Croatia. Of the Rogics' four children, only Mary survived into adulthood.

=== Education ===
Rogick went to school in Council Bluffs, Iowa, then went on to earn her A.B. in 1929 and A.M. in 1930 from the University of Omaha and the University of Nebraska. She earned her PhD from Ohio State University in 1934, under Raymond C. Osburn. Her dissertation concerned "freshwater Bryozoa of Lake Erie, doing research at the University of Ohio summer biological station at Put-in Bay, Ohio."

Through her PhD work, she developed her drawing talents to such an extent that other colleagues would later ask her to provide bryozoa illustrations for them. In addition, she prepared the illustrations for Dr. Osburn's book about bryozoa.

=== Research and teaching ===
In 1935, Rogick's first official position was teaching invertebrate biology at the College of New Rochelle where she remained for the rest of her life, eventually being promoted to professor. Despite her heavy teaching load and small salary, she arranged funding "from 1954 to 1961 by the National Science Foundation to study Antarctic Bryozoa."

She donated her collection of books and reprints about bryozoology to the Marine Biology Laboratory at Woods Hole, Massachusetts, and they are still kept as the Rogick Collection.

A collection of Rogick's classroom plans, laboratory notes, lists, and a bibliographic card index from her research on Bryozoa is archived at the Smithsonian Institution.

She was diagnosed with cancer and died on October 26, 1964.

=== Memberships ===
- American Association for the Advancement of Science (Fellow)
- Marine Biology Laboratory at Woods Hole, Massachusetts
- New York Academy of Sciences
- Academy of Antarctic Bryozoa
- Phi Beta Kappa
- Sigma Xi

== Selected works ==
- Rogick, M. D. (1931). Studies on the comparative histology of the digestive tube of certain teleost fishes II. A minnow (Campostoma anomalum). Journal of Morphology, 52(1), 1-25.
- Rogick, M. D. (1934). Additions to North American freshwater Bryozoa.
- Rogick, M. D. (1935). Studies of Freshwater Bryozoa. III, The Development of Lophopodella carteri var. typica.
- Rogick, M. D. (1945). Studies on Fresh-Water Bryozoa. XVI. Fredericella australiensis var. browni, n. var. The Biological Bulletin, 89(3), 215–228.
- Rogick, M. D. (1945). Studies on marine Bryozoa. I. Aeverrillia setigera (Hincks) 1887. The Biological Bulletin, 89(3), 201–214.
- Rogick, M. D. (1956). Studies on Marine Bryozoa. VII, Hippothoa.
