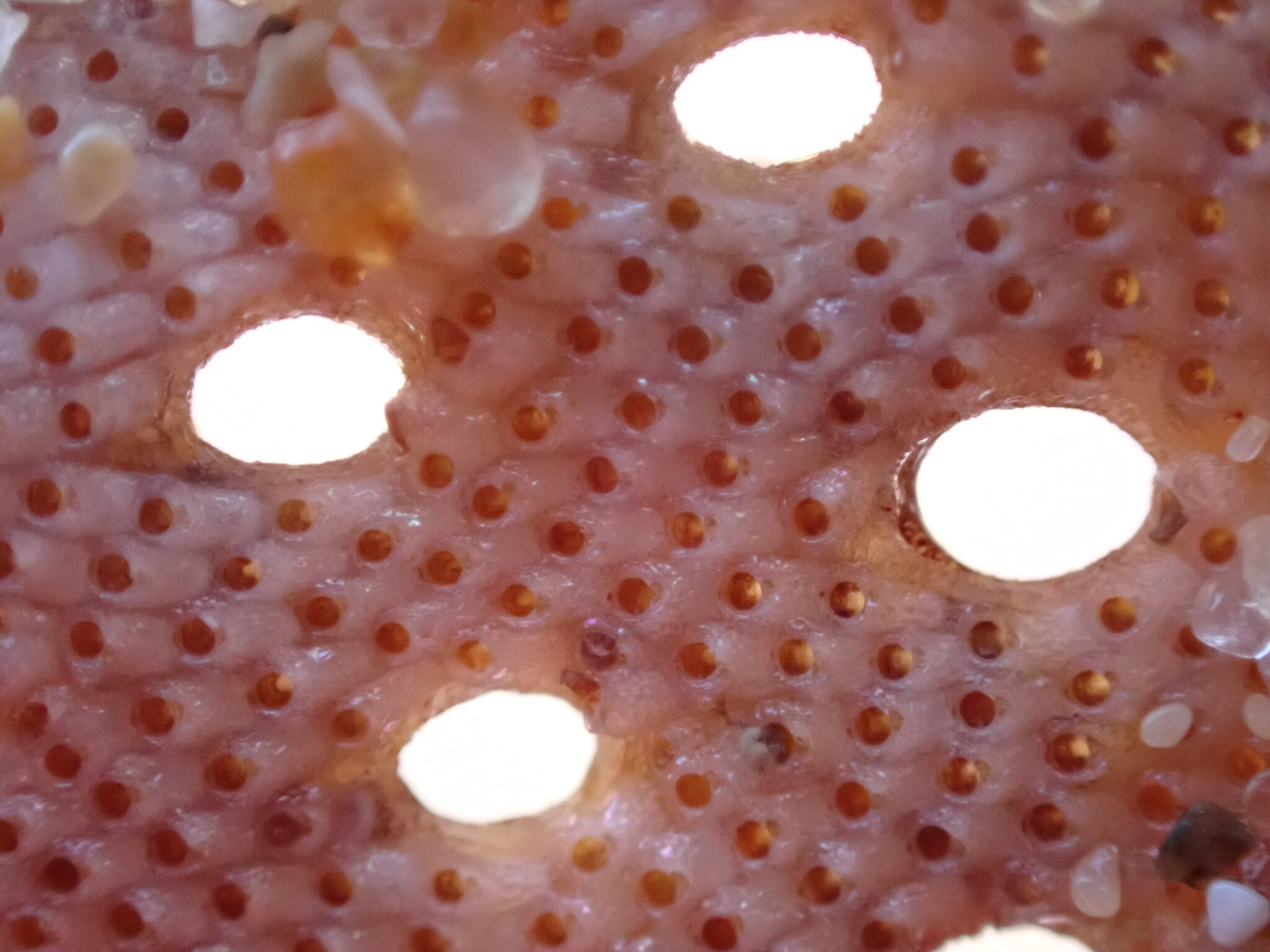
- Petralia undata

Scientific classification
- Kingdom: Animalia
- Phylum: Bryozoa
- Class: Gymnolaemata
- Order: Cheilostomatida
- Family: Petraliidae
- Genus: Petralia; MacGillivray, 1869

= Petralia (bryozoan) =

Genus of bryozoans

Petralia is a genus of bryozoans belonging to the family Petraliidae.

The species of this genus are found in Australia, Malesia, North America.

Species:

- Petralia ingens Harmer, 1957
- Petralia livingstonei Stach, 1936
- Petralia mucropora Guha & Gopikrishna, 2005
- Petralia undata MacGillivray, 1869
