= Cellaria =

Scientific classification
- Kingdom: Animalia
- Phylum: Bryozoa
- Class: Gymnolaemata
- Order: Cheilostomatida
- Family: Cellariidae
- Genus: Cellaria; Ellis & Solander, 1786

Synonyms
- List: Cellularia Pallas, 1766; Farcimia Fleming, 1828; Neocellariaeforma d'Hondt, 1985; Paramawsonia Androsova, 1972; Salicornaria Schweigger, 1819; Salicornia de Blainville, 1830

Genus of bryozoans

Cellaria is a genus of bryozoans belonging to the family Cellariidae. The genus has a cosmopolitan distribution.

== Species ==
The following species are recognised in the genus Cellaria:

- Cellaria acorensidolisi Berning & Wisshak, 2024
- †Cellaria adamantina Brown, 1952
- Cellaria anceps Harmer, 1926
- Cellaria atlantida Cook, 1967
- †Cellaria attenuata Canu & Bassler, 1935
- Cellaria australis MacGillivray, 1880
- Cellaria bafouri Matsuyama, Titschack, Baum & Freiwald, 2015
- Cellaria bassleri Hastings, 1947
- †Cellaria belensis Weiss, 1981
- †Cellaria biaperta Maplestone, 1900
- Cellaria bicornis (Busk, 1852)
- †Cellaria bicuspidata Gordon & Taylor, 2015
- †Cellaria bifaciata Canu & Bassler, 1920
- †Cellaria bipapillata Hejjas, 1894
- †Cellaria biseriata Maplestone, 1900
- Cellaria boninensis Silén, 1938
- Cellaria brasiliensis Winston, Vieira & Woollacott, 2014
- †Cellaria cactiformis d'Orbigny, 1851
- Cellaria calculosa Achilleos, Gordon & Smith, 2020
- †Cellaria catiana Weisbord, 1967
- Cellaria clavata (Busk, 1884)
- †Cellaria coleoptera Hejjas, 1893
- Cellaria complanata Liu & Hu, 1991
- †Cellaria contigua MacGillivray, 1895
- Cellaria cookae Lopez de la Cuadra & Garcia-Gomez, 1996
- Cellaria coronata (Rogick, 1956)
- Cellaria coronata Liu & Hiu, 1991
- †Cellaria crassa Wood, 1844
- †Cellaria crassimarginata Maplestone, 1900
- †Cellaria cucullata MacGillivray, 1895
- Cellaria curiosa Achilleos, Gordon & Smith, 2020
- Cellaria demissa Moyano, 2000
- †Cellaria dennanti MacGillivray, 1895
- †Cellaria depressa Maplestone, 1900
- Cellaria diffusa Robertson, 1905
- †Cellaria dimorpha Canu & Bassler, 1920
- †Cellaria distans d'Archiac, 1847
- †Cellaria distincta Weiss, 1981
- Cellaria diversa Livingstone, 1928
- Cellaria dubia (Busk, 1884)
- †Cellaria elementaria Gordon & Taylor, 1999
- †Cellaria elongata Canu, 1908
- Cellaria elongatoides Bassler, 1936
- †Cellaria enormis Maplestone, 1900
- †Cellaria extentamuralis (Rogick, 1956)
- Cellaria fistulosa (Linnaeus, 1758)
- †Cellaria forceps Lagaaij, 1952
- †Cellaria gigas Gordon & Taylor, 2015
- †Cellaria globulosa Waters, 1881
- Cellaria gracilis (Busk, 1852)
- Cellaria gracillima Achilleos, Gordon & Smith, 2020
- †Cellaria grandis Maplestone, 1901
- Cellaria granulata Canu & Bassler, 1929
- Cellaria harmelini d'Hondt, 1973
- †Cellaria hataii Hayami, 1973
- Cellaria humilis Moyano, 1983
- Cellaria immersa (Tenison-Woods, 1880)
- †Cellaria inaequalis d'Orbigny, 1851
- †Cellaria inarticulata Gordon & Taylor, 2015
- Cellaria incula Hayward & Ryland, 1993
- †Cellaria iranensis Furon & Balavoine, 1960
- Cellaria japonica Canu & Bassler, 1929
- †Cellaria levigata Di Martino, Rosso & Taylor, 2025
- Cellaria limbata Hayward & Winston, 2011
- Cellaria louisorum Winston & Woollacott, 2009
- Cellaria macricula Achilleos, Gordon & Smith, 2020
- Cellaria major Achilleos, Gordon & Smith, 2020
- Cellaria malvinensis (Busk, 1852)
- Cellaria mandibulata Hincks, 1882
- †Cellaria marginata (Muenster in Goldfuss, 1826)
- Cellaria megalodonta Hayward & Winston, 2011
- †Cellaria melillensis el-Hajjaji, 1987
- †Cellaria minima Canu, 1908
- †Cellaria minus Gordon & Taylor, 1999
- †Cellaria minuscula Canu & Lecointre, 1927
- †Cellaria minuta d'Archiac, 1847
- †Cellaria mitrata Brown, 1958
- Cellaria moniliorata Rogick, 1956
- †Cellaria mutabilis Canu, 1909
- †Cellaria myaringensis Brown, 1958
- †Cellaria nanaoensis Hayami, 1973
- †Cellaria neglecta Lagaaij, 1952
- Cellaria normani (Hastings, 1947)
- Cellaria novanglia Winston & Hayward, 2012
- Cellaria obliquidens d'Hondt & Gordon, 1999
- Cellaria oraneae Almeida, Souza & Vieira, 2018
- †Cellaria ovicellosa (Stoliczka, 1865)
- †Cellaria palatum Gordon & Taylor, 2015
- Cellaria paradoxa Hayward & Cook, 1979
- Cellaria parafistulosa d'Hondt & Gordon, 1999
- †Cellaria patagonica Canu, 1904
- †Cellaria perampla Waters, 1882
- †Cellaria perexigua Gordon & Taylor, 1999
- †Cellaria pergensi Hejjas, 1893
- Cellaria pilosa (Kirchenpauer, 1869)
- †Cellaria praelonga Harmer, 1926
- Cellaria punctata (Busk, 1852)
- †Cellaria ramosa Canu, 1908
- †Cellaria reussi d'Orbigny, 1851
- †Cellaria rhombifera (Goldfuss, 1838)
- Cellaria rigida MacGillivray, 1885
- Cellaria riograndensis Ramalho & Calliari, 2015
- †Cellaria robusta Maplestone, 1902
- Cellaria sagittula Hayward & Ryland, 1993
- Cellaria salicornioides Lamouroux, 1816
- Cellaria scoresbyi Hastings, 1947
- †Cellaria semiluna Canu, 1908
- Cellaria sinuosa (Hassall, 1840)
- Cellaria sobrinoi Lopez de la Cuadra & Garcia-Gomez, 2000
- Cellaria spatulifera Achilleos, Gordon & Smith, 2020
- Cellaria squamosa Hastings, 1947
- †Cellaria stachi Brown, 1958
- Cellaria stenorhyncha Achilleos, Gordon & Smith, 2020
- †Cellaria strictocella Canu & Bassler, 1920
- †Cellaria subexarata d'Archiac, 1847
- †Cellaria subsetigera Canu, 1904
- Cellaria subtropicalis Vieira, Gordon, Souza & Haddad, 2010
- Cellaria tecta Harmer, 1926
- †Cellaria tenuata Weiss, 1981
- Cellaria tenuirostris (Busk, 1852)
- Cellaria triangulata Canu & Bassler, 1925
- †Cellaria tridenticulata Buge, 1957
- †Cellaria tumida Maplestone, 1900
- †Cellaria unicella Thoelen, 1968
- Cellaria variabilis (Busk, 1884)
- Cellaria veleronis Osburn, 1950
- †Cellaria veteripontis Brown, 1958
- Cellaria wasinensis Waters, 1913
