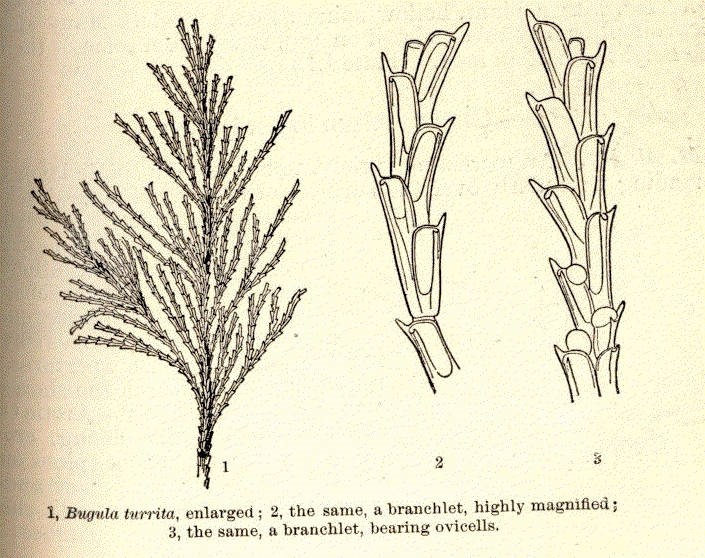

Scientific classification
- Kingdom: Animalia
- Phylum: Bryozoa
- Class: Gymnolaemata
- Order: Cheilostomatida
- Superfamily: Buguloidea
- Family: Bugulidae; Gray, 1848

Synonyms
- Bicellariellidae; Bicellariidae

= Bugulidae =

Family of bryozoans

Bugulidae is a family of bryozoans belonging to the order Cheilostomatida.

== Genera ==
The following genera are recognised in the family Bugulidae:

- Bicellariella Levinsen, 1909
- Bicellarina Levinsen, 1909
- Brettiella Gordon, 1984
- Bugula Oken, 1815
- Bugularia Levinsen, 1909
- Bugulella Verrill, 1879
- Bugulina Gray, 1848
- Calyptozoum Harmer, 1926
- Camptoplites Harmer, 1923
- Carolanna Gordon, 2021
- Caulibugula Verrill, 1900
- Cecezonella Grischenko, Gordon & Melnik, 2024
- Cornucopina Levinsen, 1909
- Corynoporella Hincks, 1888
- Crisularia Gray, 1848
- Cuneiforma d'Hondt & Schopf, 1985
- Dendrobeania Levinsen, 1909
- Dimetopia Busk, 1852
- Falsibugulella Liu, 1984
- Farciminellopsis Silén, 1941
- Halophila Gray, 1843
- Himantozoum Harmer, 1923
- Himantozoumella d'Hondt & Schopf, 1985
- Kinetoskias Danielssen, 1868
- Klugella Hastings, 1943
- Luguba Gordon, 1984
- †Mirocorcillum Dumitrică, 1972
- Nordgaardia Kluge, 1962
- Semidendrobeania d'Hondt & Schopf, 1985
- Semikinetoskias Silén, 1941
- Sessibugula Osburn, 1950
- Thaminozoum d'Hondt & Gordon, 1996
- Uschakovia Kluge, 1946
- Virididentula Fehlauer-Ale, Winston, Tilbrook, Nascimento & Vieira, 2015
- Xenoflustra Moyano, 2011
