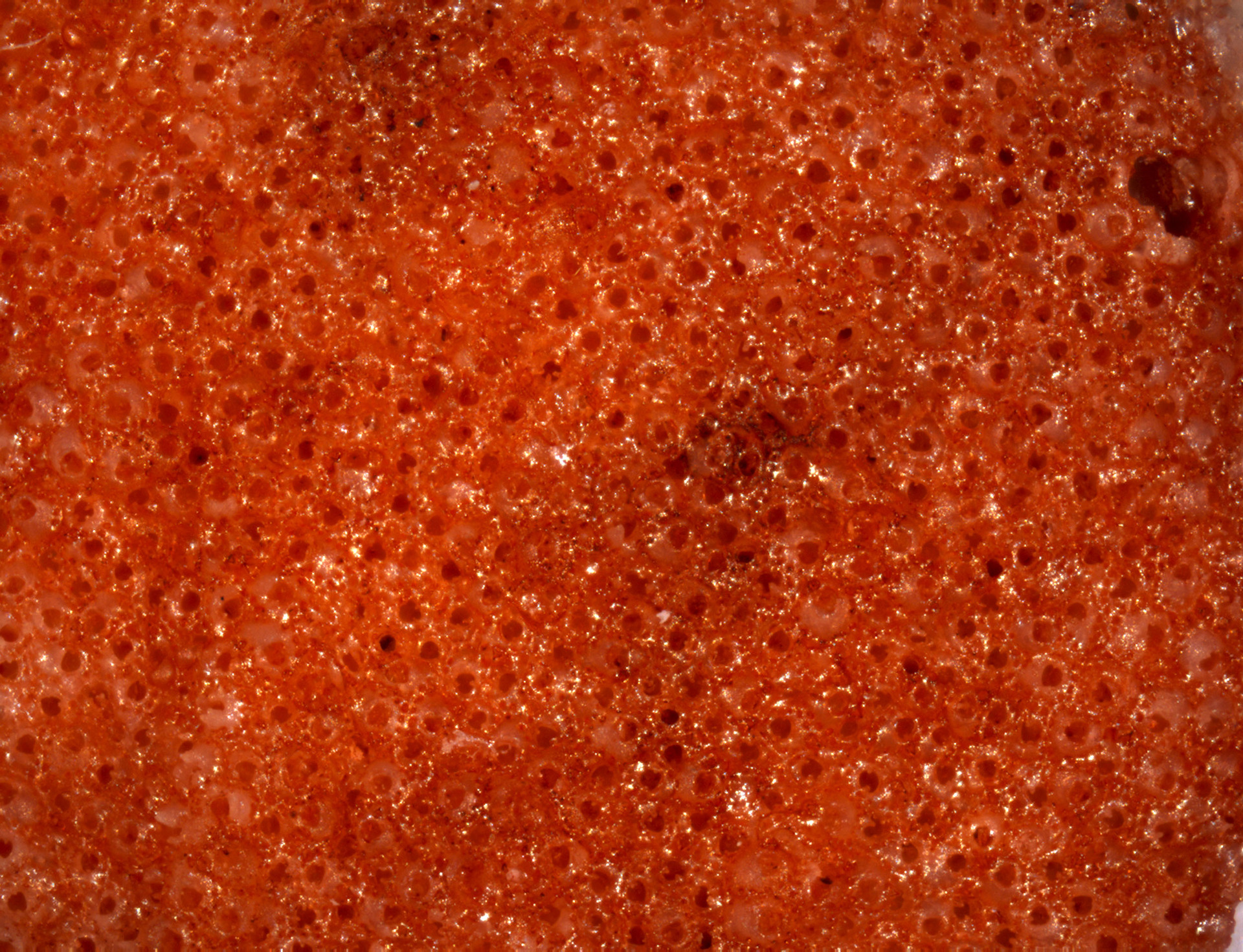
- Hippoporella

Scientific classification
- Kingdom: Animalia
- Phylum: Bryozoa
- Class: Gymnolaemata
- Order: Cheilostomatida
- Family: Hippoporidridae; Vigneaux, 1949

= Hippoporidridae =

Family of bryozoans

Hippoporidridae is a family of bryozoans belonging to the order Cheilostomatida.

Genera:

- Abditoporella Sosa-Yañez, Vieira & Solís-Marín, 2015
- Fodinella Tilbrook, Hayward & Gordon, 2001
- Hippoporella Canu, 1917
- Hippoporidra Canu & Bassler, 1927
- Hippotrema Canu & Bassler, 1927
- Odontoporella Héjjas, 1894
- Scorpiodinipora Balavoine, 1959
