= Hippotrema =

Scientific classification
- Kingdom: Animalia
- Phylum: Bryozoa
- Class: Gymnolaemata
- Order: Cheilostomatida
- Family: Hippoporidridae
- Genus: Hippotrema; Canu & Bassler, 1927

Genus of bryozoans

Hippotrema is a genus of bryozoans belonging to the family Hippoporidridae.

The species of this genus are found in Central America.

Species:

- Hippotrema fissurata Almeida & Souza, 2014
- Hippotrema janthina (Smitt, 1873)
