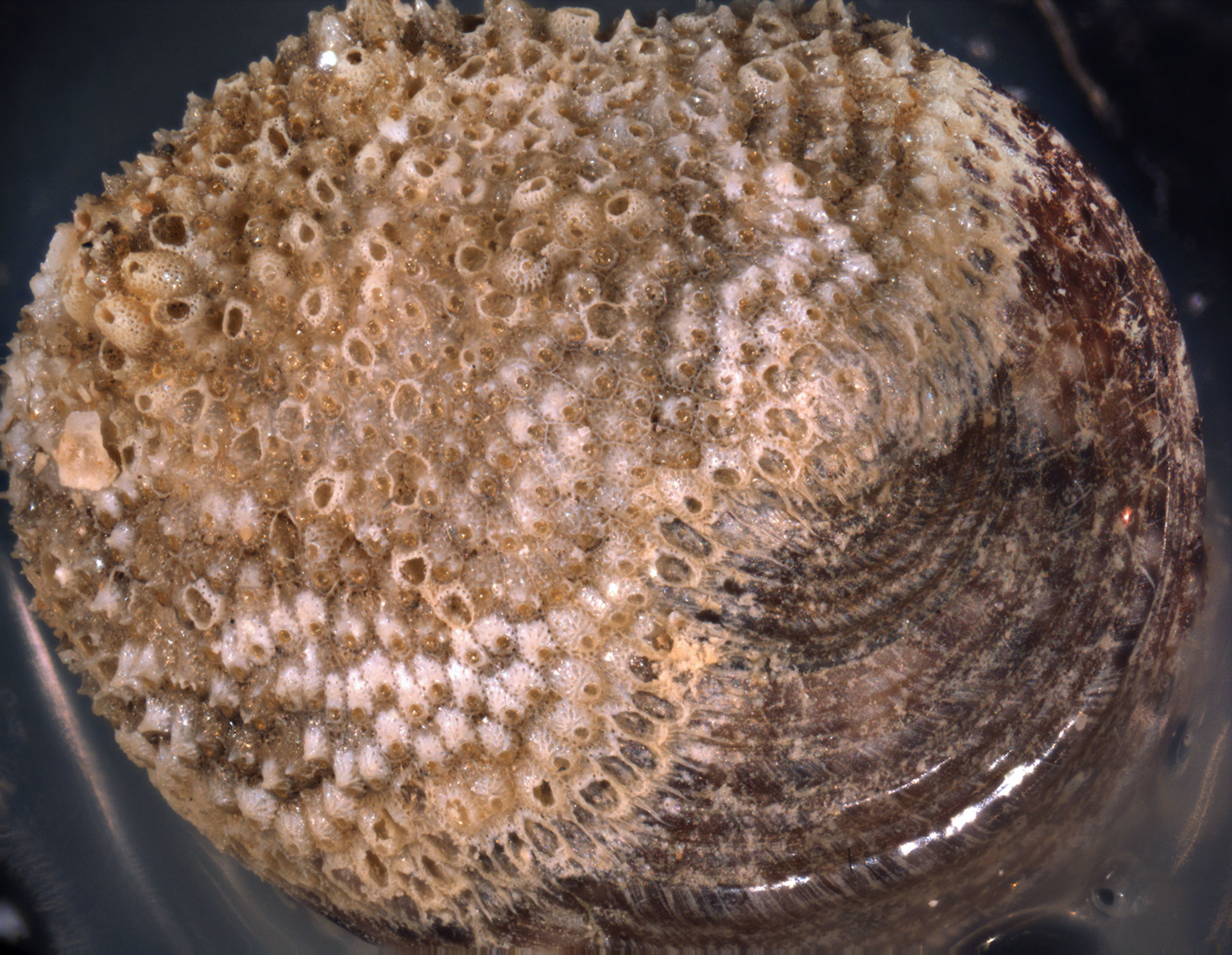
- Hippoporidra edax

Scientific classification
- Kingdom: Animalia
- Phylum: Bryozoa
- Class: Gymnolaemata
- Order: Cheilostomatida
- Family: Hippoporidridae
- Genus: Hippoporidra; Canu & Bassler, 1927

= Hippoporidra =

Genus of bryozoans

Hippoporidra is a genus of bryozoans belonging to the family Hippoporidridae.

The species of this genus are found in Atlantic Ocean.

== Species ==
Species:

- Hippoporidra barrerei (Duvergier, 1924)
- Hippoporidra calacarea Smitt, 1873
- Hippoporidra calcarea (Smitt, 1873)
