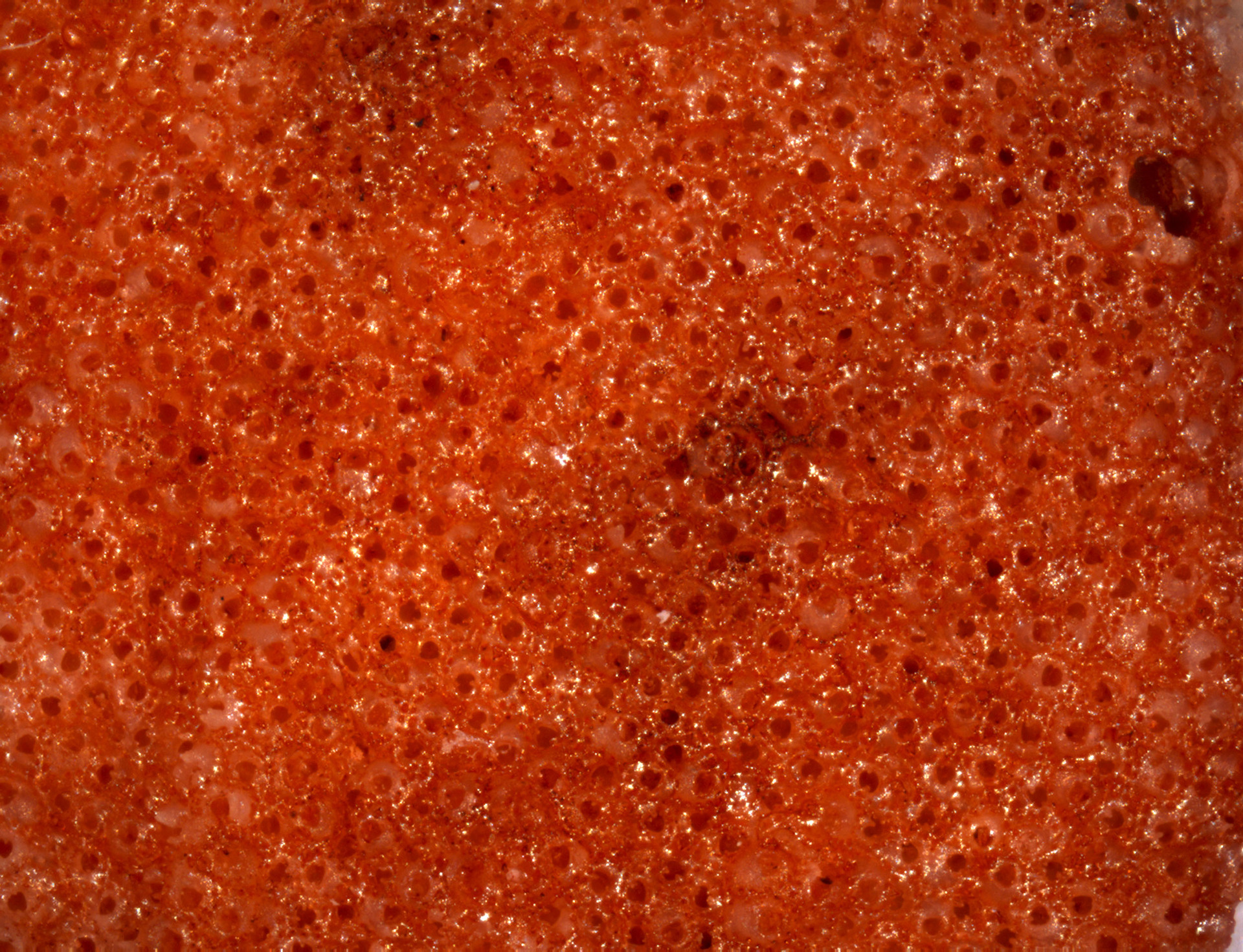
- Unidentified Hippoporella

Scientific classification
- Kingdom: Animalia
- Phylum: Bryozoa
- Class: Gymnolaemata
- Order: Cheilostomatida
- Family: Hippoporidridae
- Genus: Hippoporella; Canu, 1917

= Hippoporella =

Genus of bryozoans

Hippoporella is a genus of bryozoans belonging to the family Hippoporidridae.

The genus has almost cosmopolitan distribution.

Species:

- Hippoporella areolata Safori, 2000
- Hippoporella bicornis Canu & Lecointre, 1928
- Hippoporella castellana Winston & Vieira, 2013
- Hippoporella cornuta (Busk, 1859)
- Hippoporella costulata Canu & Bassler, 1923
- Hippoporella distans Vigneaux, 1949
- Hippoporella fabianii Cipolla, 1926
- Hippoporella fasigatoavicularis (Kluge, 1955)
- Hippoporella fastigatoavicularis Kluge, 1955
- Hippoporella filifera Canu & Lecointre, 1928
- Hippoporella gibbera Vigneaux, 1949
- Hippoporella gigantea Kataoka, 1961
- Hippoporella hippopus (Smitt, 1868)
- Hippoporella huziokai Hayami, 1975
- Hippoporella kurilensis (Gontar, 1979)
- Hippoporella labiata Hayward & Cook, 1983
- Hippoporella maderensis Souto, Reverter-Gil & Ostrovsky, 2014
- Hippoporella multiavicularia (Androsova, 1958)
- Hippoporella multilamellosa Canu & Bassler, 1920
- Hippoporella nitescens (Hincks, 1883)
- Hippoporella papulifera Canu & Bassler, 1923
- Hippoporella parva (Androsova, 1958)
- Hippoporella perforata Canu & Bassler, 1920
- Hippoporella pusilla (Smitt, 1873)
- Hippoporella rarepunctata (Canu, 1916)
- Hippoporella rimata Osburn, 1952
- Hippoporella sabulonis Winston & Vieira, 2013
- Hippoporella spinosa Canu & Bassler, 1923
- Hippoporella testu Canu & Bassler, 1935
- Hippoporella ulvlifera
- Hippoporella vincentae Canu & Bassler, 1929
