= Onychocellidae =

Scientific classification
- Kingdom: Animalia
- Phylum: Bryozoa
- Class: Gymnolaemata
- Order: Cheilostomatida
- Suborder: Flustrina
- Superfamily: Microporoidea
- Family: Onychocellidae; Jullien, 1882

Family of bryozoans

Onychocellidae is a family of bryozoans belonging to the order Cheilostomatida.

== Genera ==
The following genera are recognised in the family Onychocellidae:

- †Aechmella Canu & Bassler, 1917
- †Aechmellina Taylor, Martha & Gordon, 2018
- †Amphiblestrella Prud'homme, 1961
- †Atoichos Flórez, Di Martino & Ramalho, 2021
- †Cheethamia Shaw, 1967
- Chondriovelum Hayward & Thorpe, 1988
- †Collura Jullien, 1882
- †Dictuonia Jullien, 1881
- †Distefanella Cipolla, 1922
- †Ehrhardina Martha & Taylor, 2016
- †Escharifora d'Orbigny, 1852
- †Euritina Canu, 1900
- Floridina Jullien, 1881
- Floridinella Canu & Bassler, 1917
- †Holsacella Voigt, 1999
- †Hoplitaechmella Voigt, 1949
- †Inversaria von Hagenow, 1851
- †Kamilocella Taylor, Martha & Gordon, 2018
- †Latereschara d'Orbigny, 1852
- †Nudicella Schmidt & Bone, 2004
- †Nudonychocella Voigt & Ernst, 1985
- †Ogiva Jullien, 1882
- Onychocella Jullien, 1882
- †Onychocellaria Voigt, 1957
- †Paraechmellina Håkansson, Gordon & Taylor, 2024
- †Pseudolunulites Cook & Voigt, 1986
- †Radulopora Voigt, 1968
- Rectonychocella Canu & Bassler, 1917
- †Reptolunulites d'Orbigny, 1852
- †Rhagasostoma Koschinsky, 1885
- †Rhebasia Jullien, 1882
- Smittipora Jullien, 1882
- †Solenonychocella Voigt & Williams, 1973
- †Sonarina Taylor & Di Martino, 2018
- †Tobolocella Koromyslova, Pakhnevich & Fedorov, 2019
- †Tornipora Jürgensen, 1971
- †Tyloporella Voigt, 1989
- †Vibracella Waters, 1891
- †Woodipora Jullien, 1888
