= Smittipora =

Scientific classification
- Kingdom: Animalia
- Phylum: Bryozoa
- Class: Gymnolaemata
- Order: Cheilostomatida
- Family: Onychocellidae
- Genus: Smittipora; Jullien, 1882

Synonyms
- Diplopholeos Canu & Bassler, 1917; Velumella Canu & Bassler, 1917

Genus of bryozoans

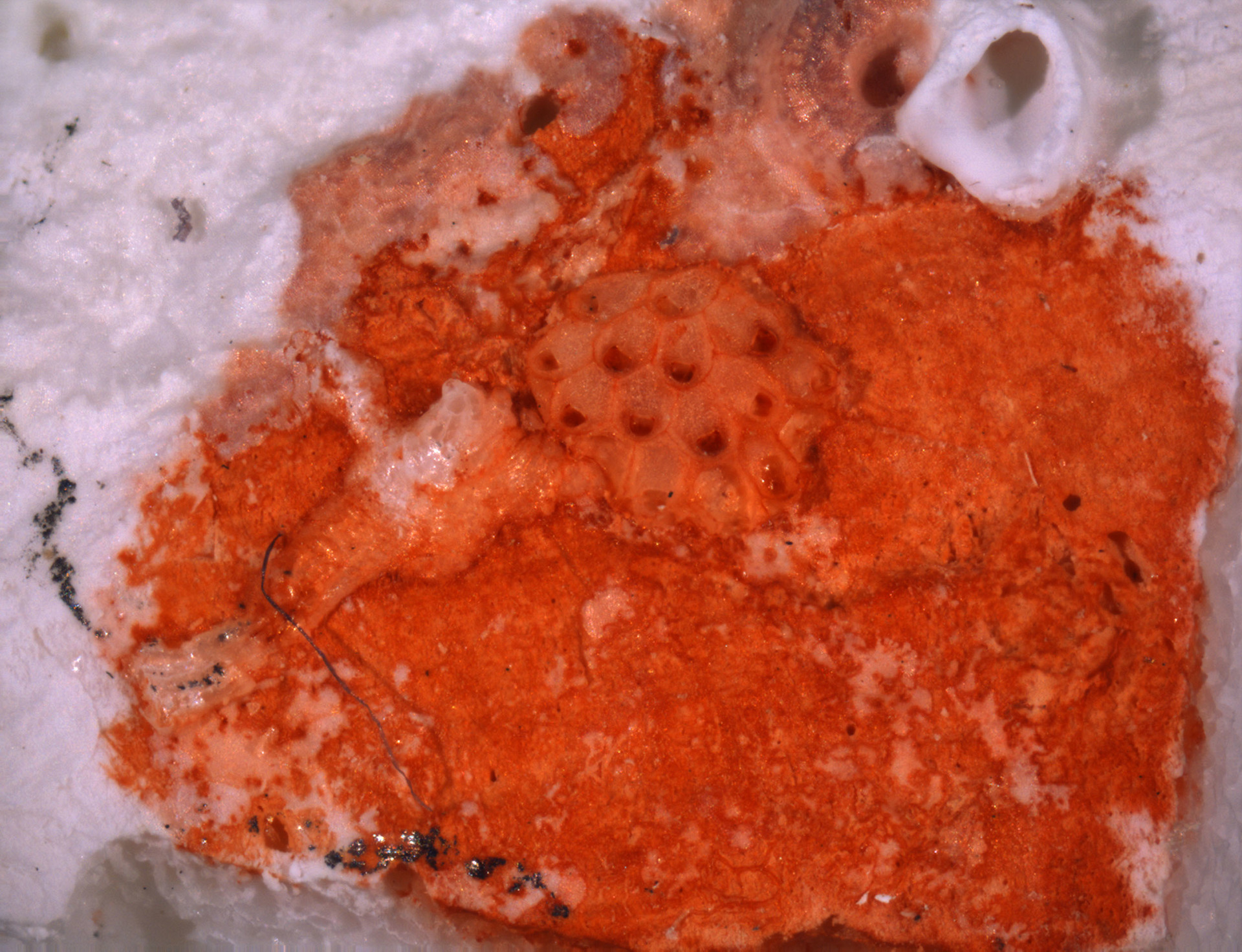

Smittipora is a genus of bryozoans belonging to the family Onychocellidae.

The genus has an almost cosmopolitan distribution.

== Species ==
The following species are recognised in the genus Smittipora:

- Smittipora abyssicola (Smitt, 1873)
- Smittipora acutirostris (Canu & Bassler, 1928)
- Smittipora adeoniformis d'Hondt, 1986
- Smittipora americana (Canu & Bassler, 1928)
- †Smittipora articularia Labracherie, 1975
- †Smittipora bilamellaria (Canu & Bassler, 1920)
- †Smittipora bourgeoisi (d'Orbigny, 1851)
- †Smittipora calliope (d'Orbigny, 1851)
- †Smittipora cellarioides Canu, 1907
- †Smittipora cheethami el Safori, 2000
- †Smittipora claudia (d'Orbigny, 1851)
- Smittipora cordiformis Harmer, 1926
- †Smittipora creona (d'Orbigny, 1851)
- †Smittipora dentifera (Voigt, 1962)
- †Smittipora dimorphocella (Canu & Bassler, 1935)
- †Smittipora elliptica (Canu & Bassler, 1920)
- †Smittipora elongata (Canu & Bassler, 1923)
- Smittipora fenestrata d'Hondt & Gordon, 1999
- †Smittipora fusiformis (Canu & Bassler, 1917)
- †Smittipora grandiconis Zágoršek, 1996
- †Smittipora hantonensis (Brydone, 1930)
- Smittipora harmeriana (Canu & Bassler, 1929)
- Smittipora inarmata (Canu & Bassler, 1929)
- †Smittipora irregularis (Duvergier, 1924)
- †Smittipora leognanensis (Vigneaux, 1949)
- †Smittipora levigata (Canu & Bassler, 1920)
- Smittipora levinseni (Canu & Bassler, 1917)
- †Smittipora lineata (Canu & Bassler, 1920)
- †Smittipora parvulipora (Canu & Bassler, 1920)
- †Smittipora peregrina (d'Orbigny, 1852)
- Smittipora philippinensis Canu & Bassler, 1929
- †Smittipora platystoma (Reuss, 1848)
- †Smittipora plicata (Canu & Bassler, 1920)
- †Smittipora prisca (Voigt, 1924)
- †Smittipora ryukuensis Kataoka, 1961
- †Smittipora sagittaria (Canu & Bassler, 1920)
- †Smittipora sagittellaria (Canu & Bassler, 1920)
- Smittipora sawayai Marcus, 1937
- †Smittipora semiluna (Canu & Bassler, 1920)
- †Smittipora tenuis (Canu & Bassler, 1920)
- Smittipora tuberculata (Canu & Bassler, 1928)
- †Smittipora verticillata (d'Orbigny, 1851)
