= List of the Paleozoic life of Tennessee =

This list of the Paleozoic life of Tennessee contains the various prehistoric life-forms whose fossilized remains have been reported from within the US state of Tennessee and are between 538.8 and 252.17 million years of age.

== A ==
- †Abatocrinus
  - †Abatocrinus grandis
- †Acanthocrania
- †Acantholaminatus
  - †Acantholaminatus multistylus
  - †Acantholaminatus typicus
- †Acodus
- †Actinoceras
  - †Actinoceras capitolinum
  - †Actinoceras cuvieri
  - †Actinoceras tenuifilum
- †Actinocrinites
- †Adinocrinus
- †Agaricocrinus
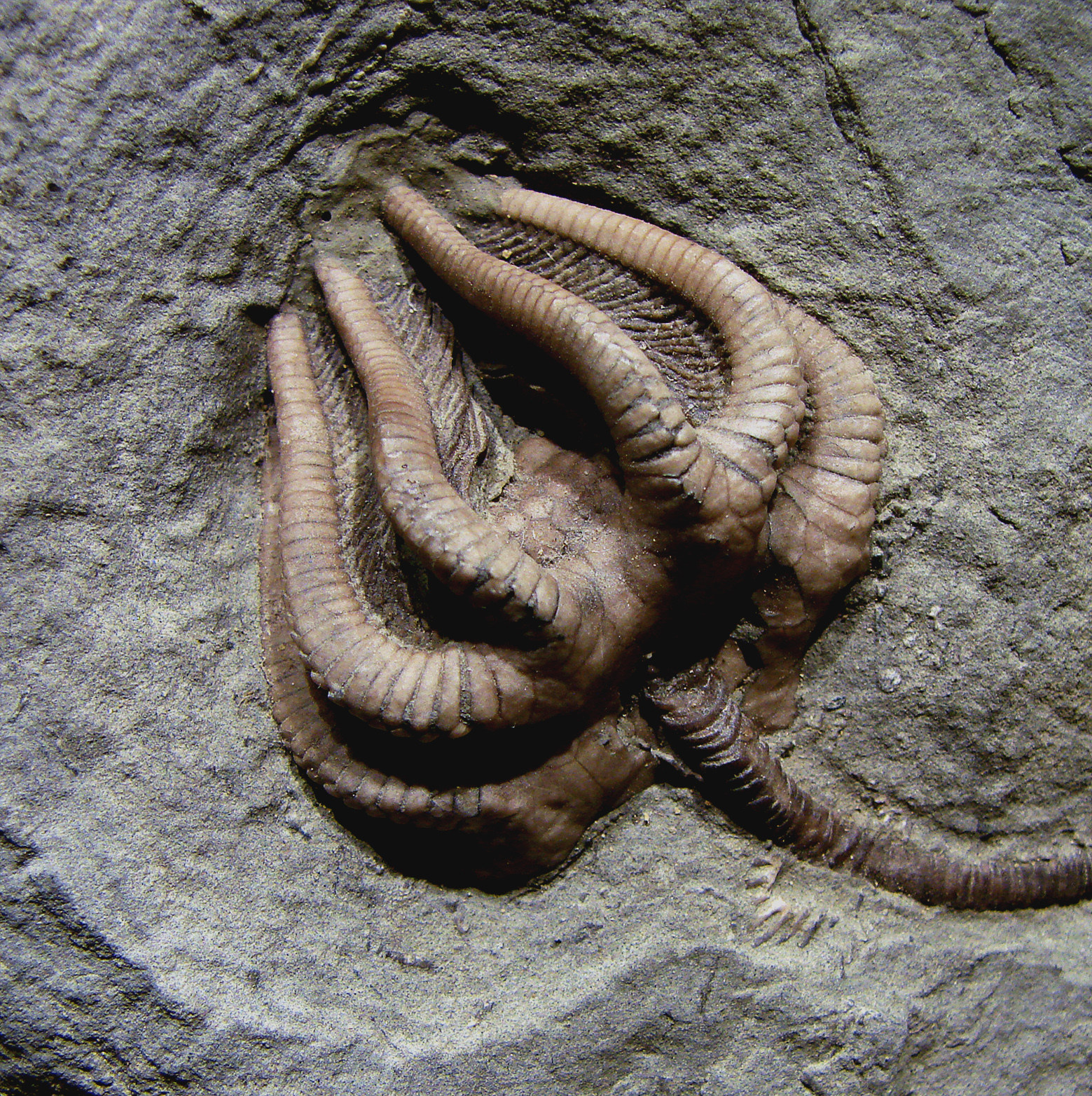
  - Fossilized calyx of the Carboniferous crinoid ("sea lily") Agaricocrinus americanus, or the mushroom crinoid
    †Agaricocrinus americanus
  - †Agaricocrinus crassus
- †Agassizocrinus
  - †Agassizocrinus dissimilis
- †Agelacrinus
  - †Agelacrinus cincinnatiensis
- †Alaskadiscus
  - †Alaskadiscus cristatus
  - †Alaskadiscus subacutus
- †Allagecrinida
- †Alloprosallocrinus
  - †Alloprosallocrinus conicus
- †Allosaccus
- †Ambonychia
  - †Ambonychia intermedius
- †Ammodiscella
- †Amphilichas
  - †Amphilichas halli
- †Amphipsalidiocrinus
- †Amplexizaphrentis
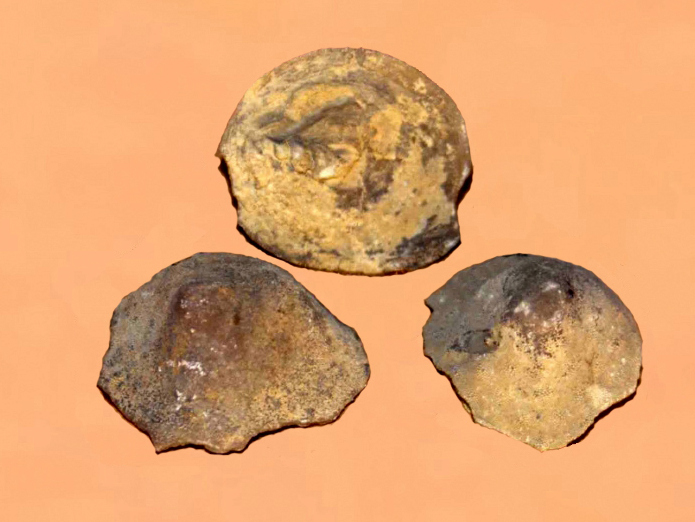
- Fossils of the Ordovician-Permian bryozoan Amplexopora
  †Amplexopora
  - †Amplexopora ampla
  - †Amplexopora columbiana
  - †Amplexopora convoluta
  - †Amplexopora cylindracea
  - †Amplexopora filiasa
  - †Amplexopora petasiformis
- †Amplexus
- †Ampyx
- †Ampyxina
- †Anaphragma
  - †Anaphragma hermitagensis
  - †Anaphragma mirabile
- †Anastrophia
  - †Anastrophia internascens
  - †Anastrophia verneuili
- †Anazyga
  - †Anazyga recurvirostra
- †Ancistrorhyncha
  - †Ancistrorhyncha costata
- †Anisopleurella
- †Anolotichia
  - †Anolotichia explanata
  - †Anolotichia ponderosa
- †Anopliopsis
- †Anoplotheca
  - †Anoplotheca concava
- †Aphelaspis
  - †Aphelaspis walcotti – type locality for species
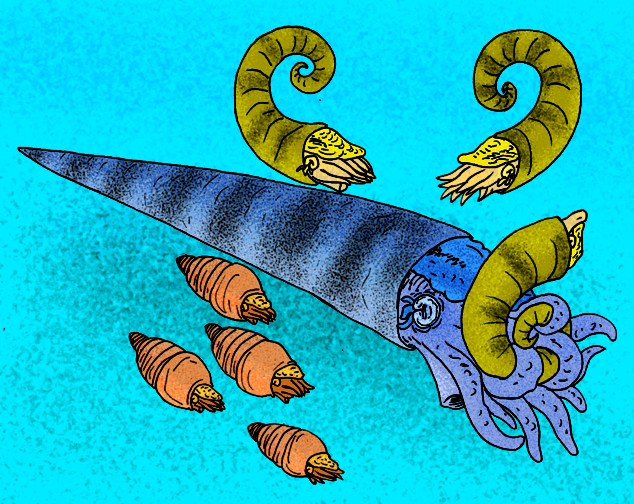
- Restoration of the Late Ordovician nautiloid cephalopod Aphetoceras being preyed upon by a Cameroceras
  †Aphetoceras
  - †Aphetoceras oderi
- †Apodasmocrinus
- †Apopliopsis
- †Archinacella
  - †Archinacella patelliformis
- †Arthroclema
  - †Arthroclema striatum
- †Astraeospongium
- †Astreptodictya
- †Astylospongia
  - †Astylospongia praemorsa
- †Atactoporella
  - †Atactoporella insueta
  - †Atactoporella mundula
  - †Atactoporella typicalis
- †Atelelasma
- †Atelestocrinus
- †Athrophragma
- †Atrypa
  - †Atrypa reticularis – report made of unidentified related form or using admittedly obsolete nomenclature
- †Atrypina
  - †Atrypina disparilis
  - †Atrypina imbricata
- †Aulacella
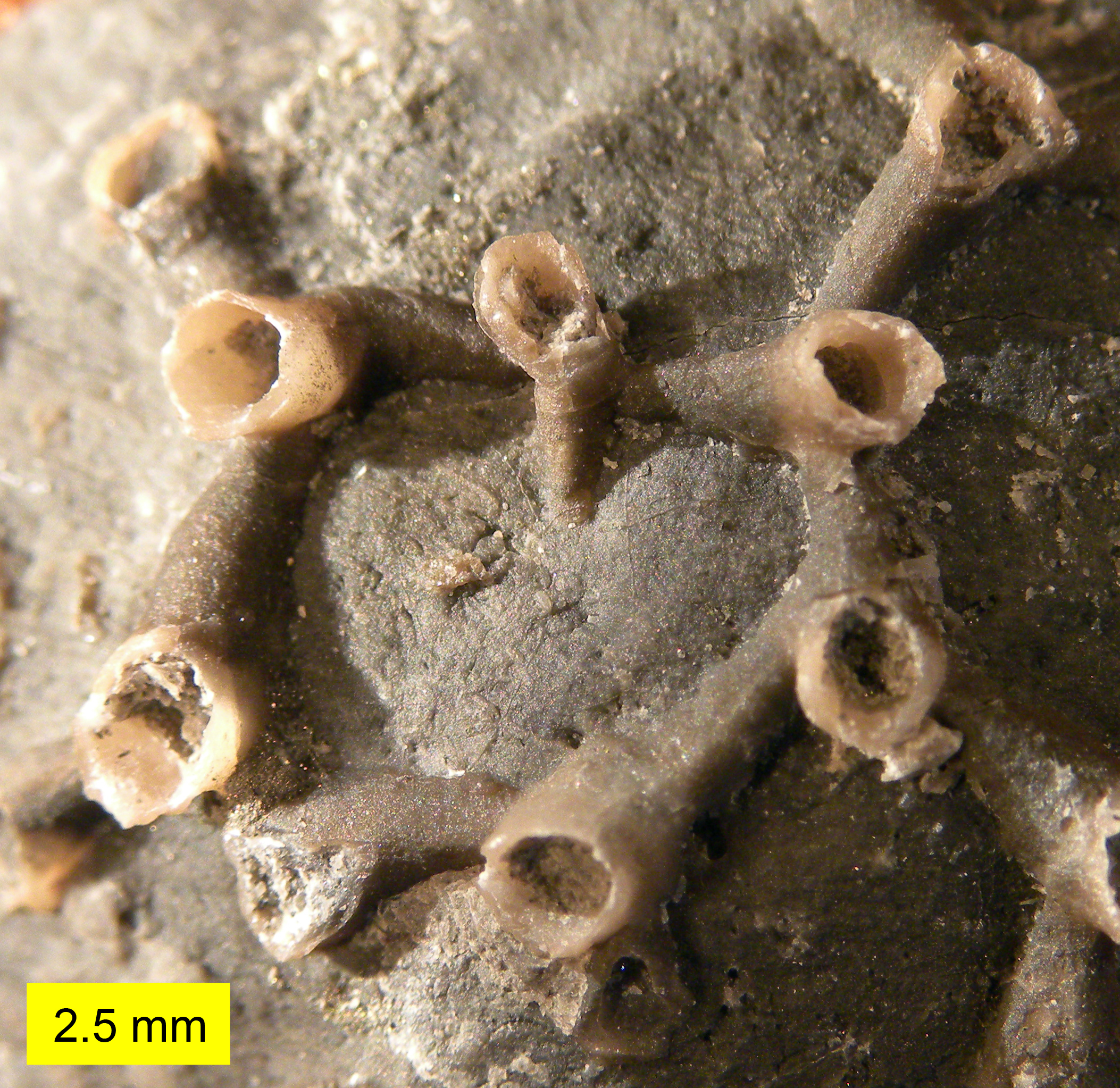
- Fossil of the Late Ordovician-Permian tabulate coral Aulopora
  †Aulopora
  - †Aulopora trentonensis
- †Auloporella
- †Austinella
  - †Austinella kankakensis
- †Australosutura
- †Avaoceras
  - †Avaoceras wellsense

== B ==
- Bairdia
- †Barycrinus
  - †Barycrinus rhombiferus
  - †Barycrinus sculptus
  - †Barycrinus spurius
  - †Barycrinus stellatus
- †Batherocystis
  - †Batherocystis appressa
- †Bathyurus
  - †Bathyurus extans
- †Batostoma
  - †Batostoma confertum
  - †Batostoma dendroidea
  - †Batostoma fertile
  - †Batostoma inutile
  - †Batostoma libana
  - †Batostoma minnesotensis
  - †Batostoma ramosum
  - †Batostoma subcrassum
- †Batostomella
  - †Batostomella subgracilis
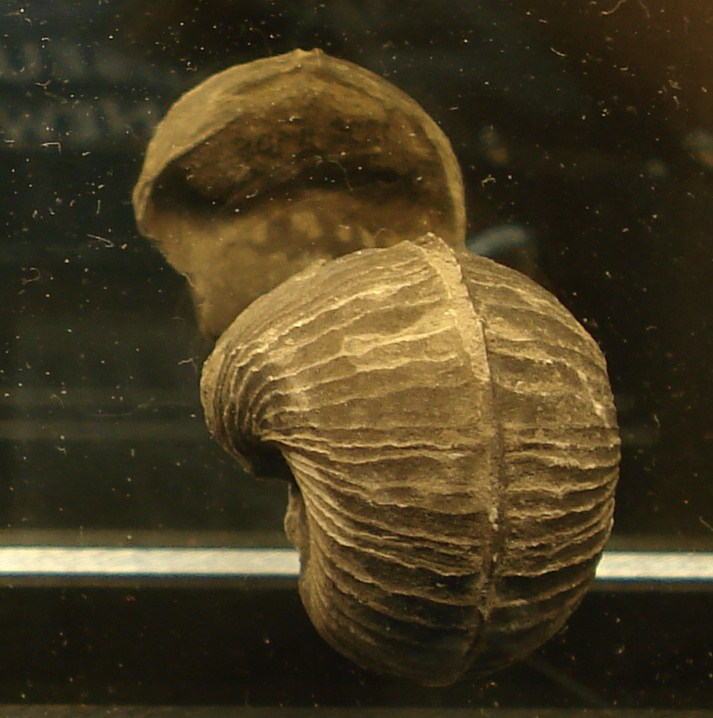
- Fossilized shell of the Silurian-Early Triassic mollusc Bellerophon
  †Bellerophon
- †Belodella
  - †Belodella silurica
- †Belodina
- †Bembexia
- †Bergaueria
- †Billingsaria
- †Billingsites
  - †Billingsites williamsportensis – tentative report
- †Bimuria
  - †Bimuria superba
- †Botryocrinus
  - †Botryocrinus polyxa
- †Bouskacrinus
  - †Bouskacrinus waldronensis
- †Brachymetopus
- †Brachyprion
  - †Brachyprion purduei
- †Breyeria
  - †Breyeria rappi – type locality for species
- †Bucania
- †Bucanospira – type locality for genus
  - †Bucanospira expansa – type locality for species
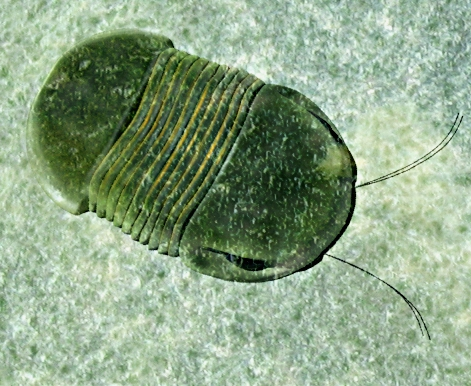
- Life restoration of the Early Ordovician-Silurian trilobite Bumastus
  †Bumastus
- †Buskopora
- †Byssonychia
  - †Byssonychia radiata
- †Bythopora
  - †Bythopora dendrina
  - †Bythopora gracilis
  - †Bythopora laxta

== C ==
- Calloporina
  - †Calloporina parva
- †Calopora
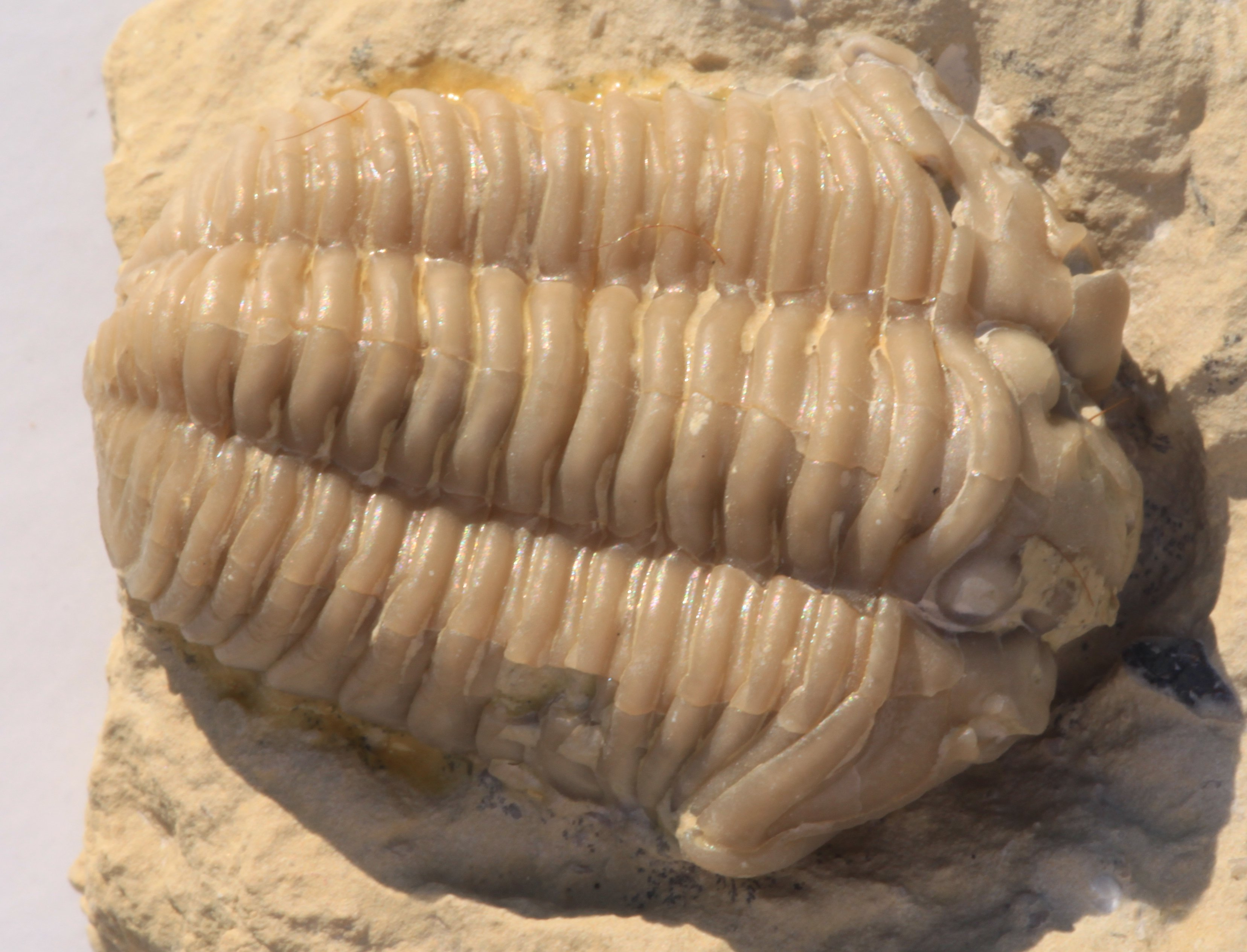
- Fossil of the Early Ordovician-Early Devonian trilobite Calymene
  †Calymene
  - †Calymene niagarensis
- †Calyptaulax
- †Camarotoechia
- †Camerella
- †Carinaropsis
  - †Carinaropsis cunulae
- †Cartersoceras – type locality for genus
  - †Cartersoceras shideleri – type locality for species
- †Caryocrinites
  - †Caryocrinites persculptus
- †Cataschisma
  - †Cataschisma convexum
- †Catillocrinus
  - †Catillocrinus tennesseeae
- †Catoraphiceras
  - †Catoraphiceras lobatum
- †Ceramoporella
  - †Ceramoporella grandis
  - †Ceramoporella ingenua
  - †Ceramoporella ohioensis
  - †Ceramoporella whitei
- †Ceratopea
  - †Ceratopea grandis
- †Ceratopsis
  - †Ceratopsis intermedia
- †Ceraurinus
  - †Ceraurinus scofieldi
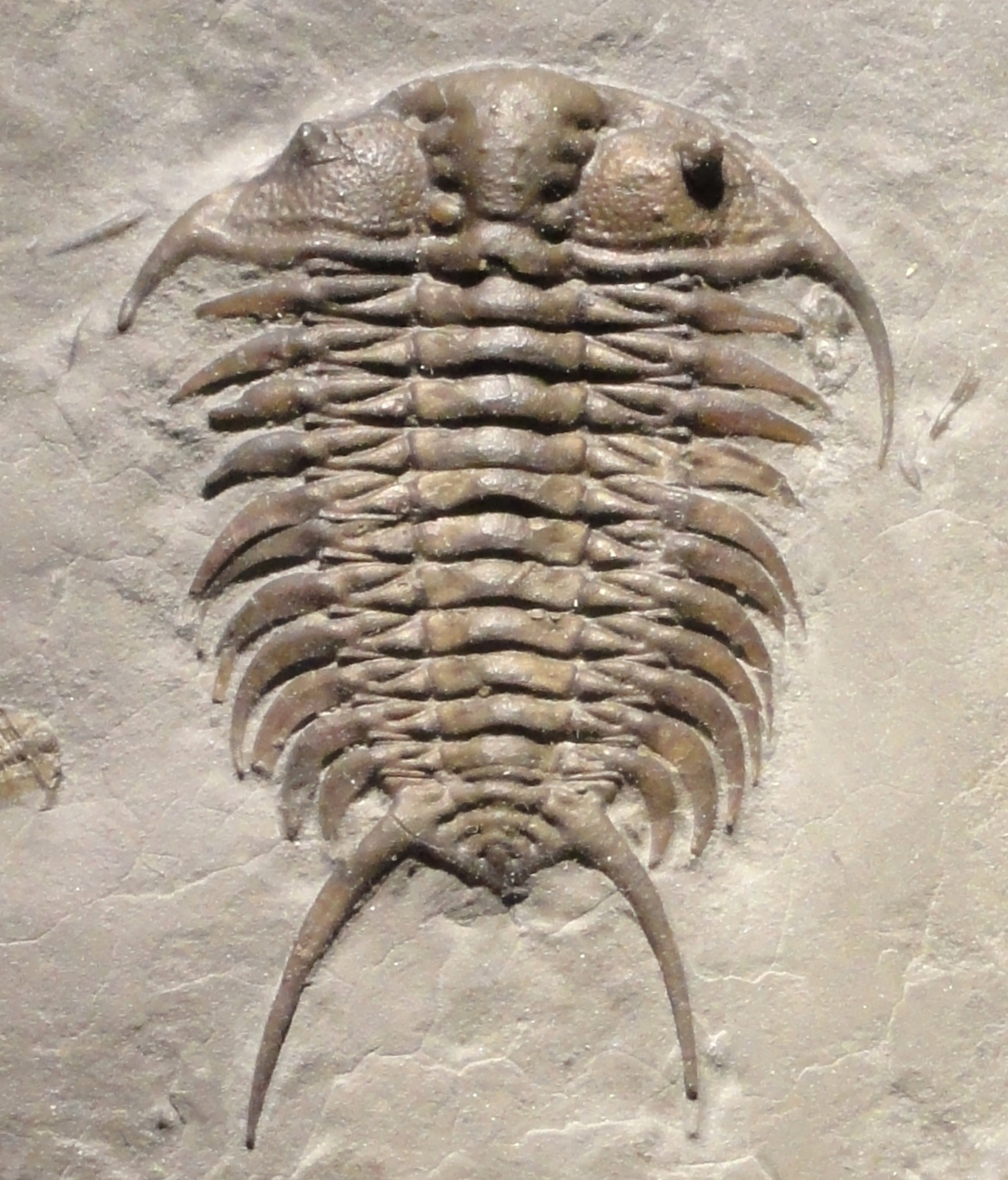
- Fossil of the Middle-Late Ordovician trilobite Ceraurus
  †Ceraurus
  - †Ceraurus milleranus
  - †Ceraurus pleurexanthemus – or unidentified comparable form
- †Cestites
  - †Cestites mirabilis
- †Champlainopora – tentative report
- †Chasmataspis
  - †Chasmataspis laurencii
- †Chasmatopora
  - †Chasmatopora sublaxa
- †Chaulistomella
  - †Chaulistomella ridleyensis
- †Chazydictya – tentative report
- †Cheirurus
  - †Cheirurus niagarensis
- †Chepultapecia
  - †Chepultapecia leiosomella
- †Chonetes
  - †Chonetes glenparkensis – or unidentified related form
- †Christiania
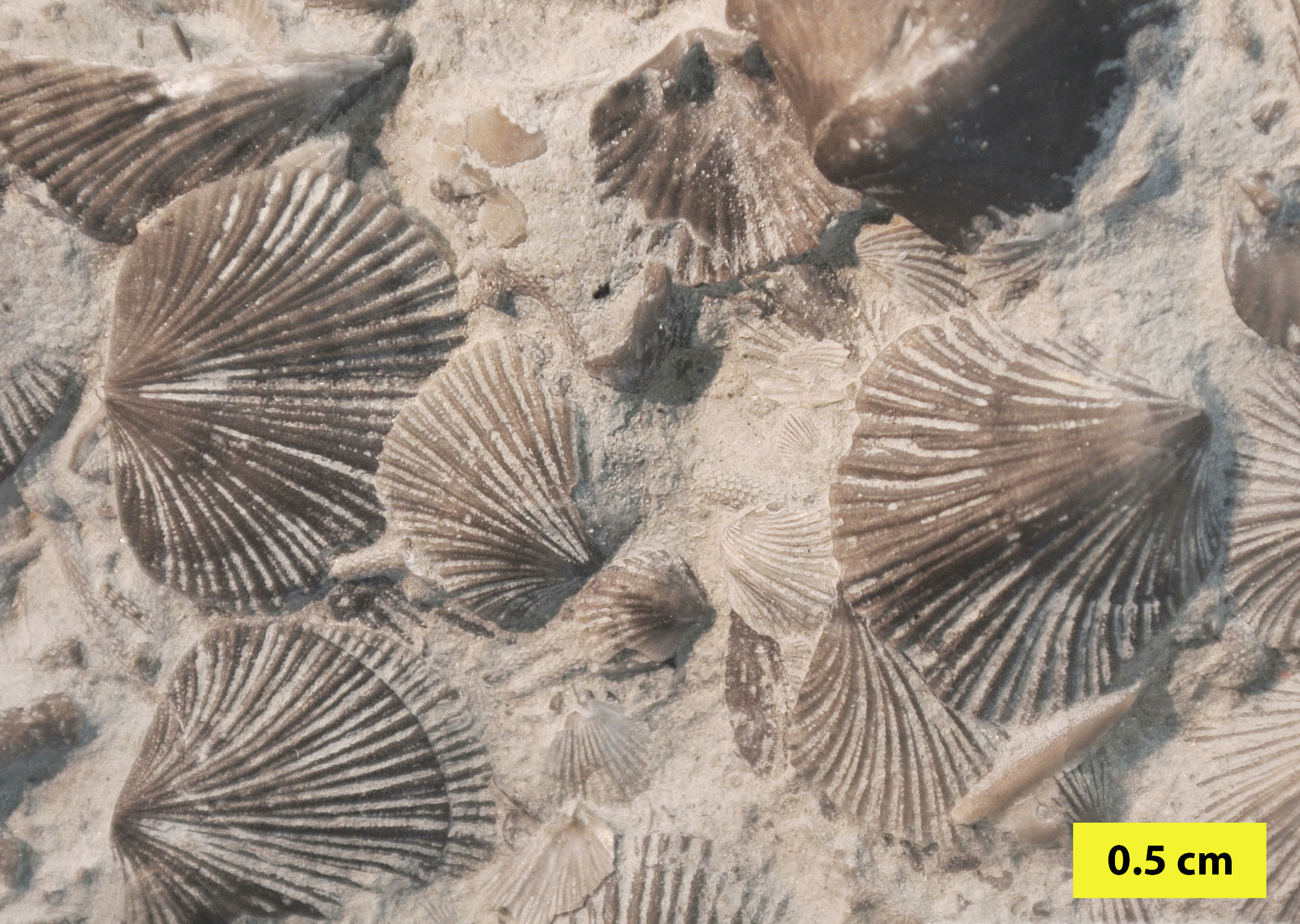
- Assemblage of fossilized shells of the Ordovician brachiopod Cincinnetina
  †Cincinnetina
  - †Cincinnetina meeki
- †Cladochonus
  - †Cladochonus amplexus
  - †Cladochonus crassus
- †Cleiocrinus
  - †Cleiocrinus tessallatus
- †Cleiothyridina
- †Cliophorus
  - †Cliophorus fabula
- †Clisospira
- †Coeloclema
  - †Coeloclema consimile
  - †Coeloclema inflatum
  - †Coeloclema pierceanum
- †Colaptomena
  - †Colaptomena obesa
- †Columbicrinus
  - †Columbicrinus crassus
- †Columnaria
  - †Columnaria alveolata
  - †Columnaria crenulata
  - †Columnaria halli
  - †Columnaria stellata
- †Coniculospongia
  - †Coniculospongia radiata
- †Conocardium
- †Conotreta
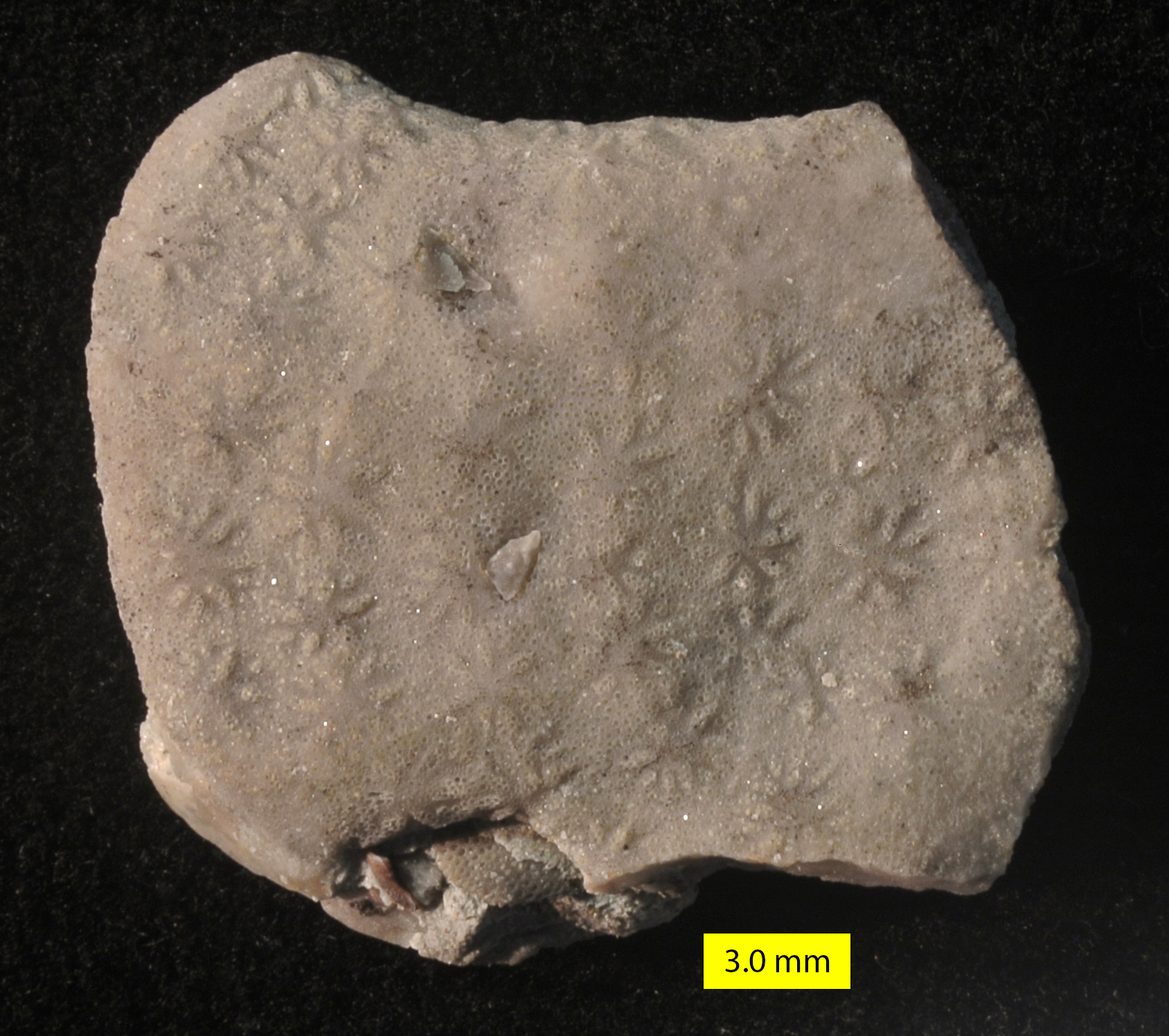
- Fossil of the Ordovician bryozoan Constellaria
  †Constellaria
  - †Constellaria emaciata
  - †Constellaria fischeri
  - †Constellaria florida
  - †Constellaria lamellosa
  - †Constellaria polystomella
  - †Constellaria teres
  - †Constellaria varia
- †Coolinia
  - †Coolinia subplana
- †Coopericystis – type locality for genus
  - †Coopericystis pyriformis – type locality for species
- †Cornulites
  - †Cornulites minor
  - †Cornulites proprius
- †Coronocystis
- †Corynotrypa
  - †Corynotrypa delicatula
  - †Corynotrypa inflata
  - †Corynotrypa tennesseensis
  - †Corynotrypa turgida
- †Costalocrinus
  - †Costalocrinus cornutus
- Crania
  - †Crania laelia
- †Craniops
- †Crepicephalus
  - †Crepicephalus comus
  - †Crepicephalus thoosa
- †Crepipora
  - †Crepipora hemispherica
  - †Crepipora simulans
- †Crurithyris
  - †Crurithyris parva
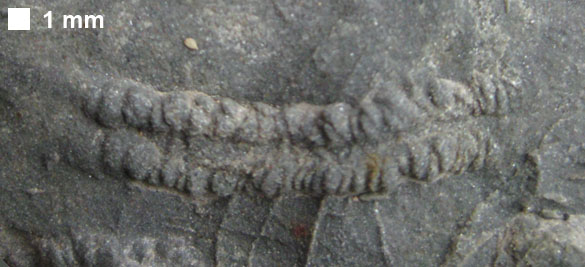
- Fossil of the Devonian-Triassic arthropod trackway ichnogenus Cruziana
  †Cruziana
- †Ctenobolbina
  - †Ctenobolbina subcrassa
- †Ctenodonta
  - †Ctenodonta gibberula
  - †Ctenodonta hartsvillensis
  - †Ctenodonta hermitagenesis
  - †Ctenodonta hermitagensis
  - †Ctenodonta obliqua
  - †Ctenodonta subrotunda
- †Ctenostoma
- †Cuneamya
- †Cupulocorona
  - †Cupulocorona gemmiformis
  - †Cupulocorona tennesseensis
- †Cyatbaxonia
  - †Cyatbaxonia tantilla
- †Cyathaxonia
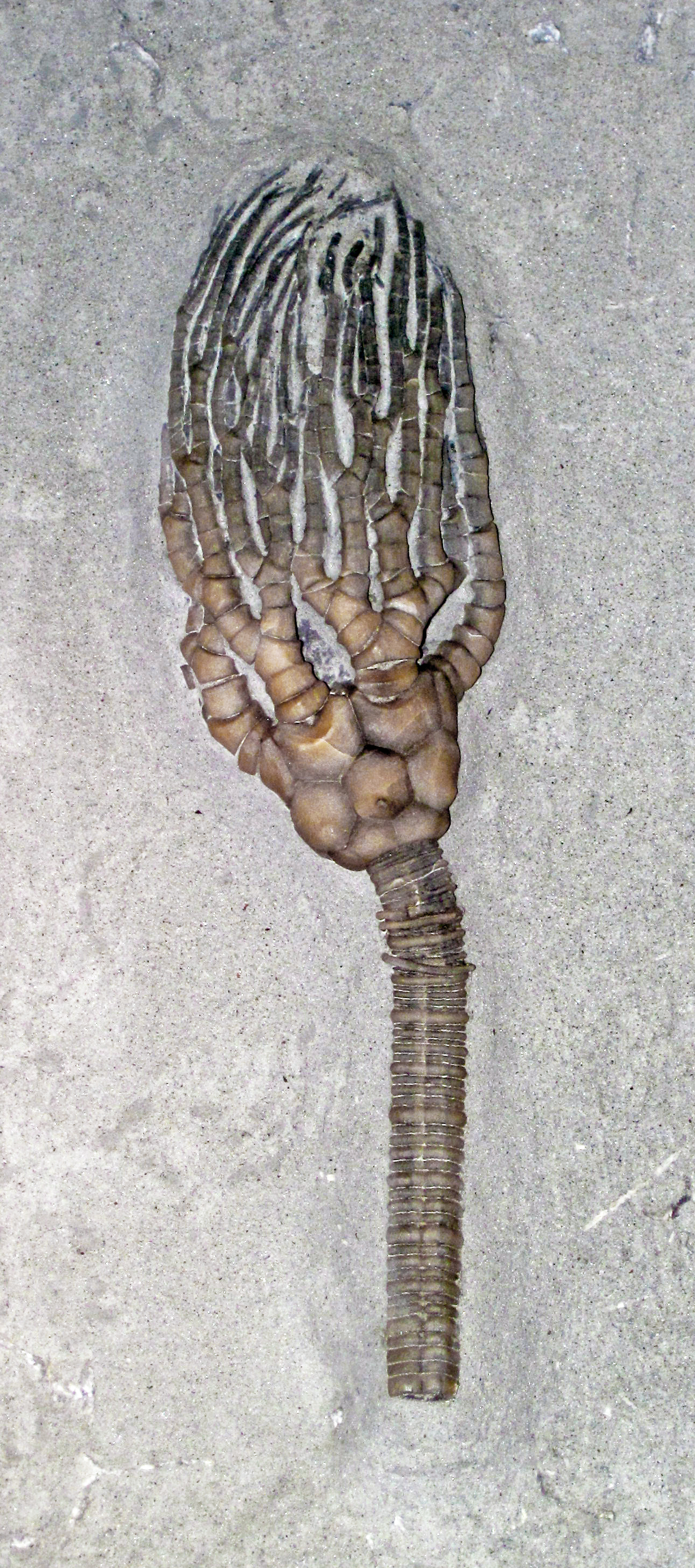
- Fossilized calyx and partial stem of the Silurian-Permian crinoid ("sea lily") Cyathocrinites
  †Cyathocrinites
  - †Cyathocrinites farleyi
  - †Cyathocrinites iowensis
- †Cycloholcus – type locality for genus
  - †Cycloholcus nummus – type locality for species
- †Cyclonema
  - †Cyclonema bilix
  - †Cyclonema fluctuatum
  - †Cyclonema mediale
  - †Cyclonema minuta
  - †Cyclonema praecipitum – type locality for species
  - †Cyclonema varicosum
- †Cyclora
  - †Cyclora pulcella
- †Cyphaspis
  - †Cyphaspis christyi
- †Cyphotrypa
  - †Cyphotrypa acervulosa
  - †Cyphotrypa frankfortensis – or unidentified comparable form
- †Cypricardinia
  - †Cypricardinia alta
- †Cyrtina
  - †Cyrtina burlingtonensis
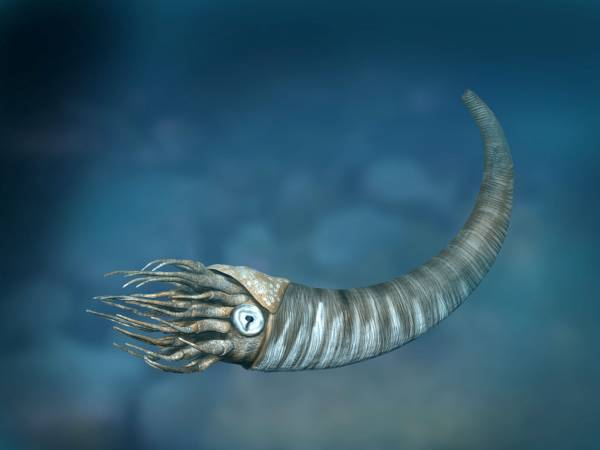
- Restoration of the Cambrian-Middle Devonian nautiloid cephalopod Cyrtoceras
  †Cyrtoceras
  - †Cyrtoceras convidale
  - †Cyrtoceras stonense – tentative report
  - †Cyrtoceras vallandighami
- †Cyrtodonta
  - †Cyrtodonta grandis
  - †Cyrtodonta huronensis
  - †Cyrtodonta saffordi
- †Cyrtodontula
- †Cyrtolites
  - †Cyrtolites inornatum
  - †Cyrtolites ornatus
  - †Cyrtolites retrorsus
- †Cyrtonella
- †Cyrtonotella
- †Cyrtospira
  - †Cyrtospira tortilis – type locality for species
- †Cyrtostropha
  - †Cyrtostropha salteri
- †Cystodictya

== D ==
- †Dactylogonia
  - †Dactylogonia incrassata
- †Dalejina
  - †Dalejina hybrida – report made of unidentified related form or using admittedly obsolete nomenclature
  - †Dalejina newsomensis
- †Dalmanella
  - †Dalmanella bassleri – or unidentified comparable form
  - †Dalmanella eminens
  - †Dalmanella fertilis
  - †Dalmanella jugosa
  - †Dalmanella subcarinata
  - †Dalmanella tersa
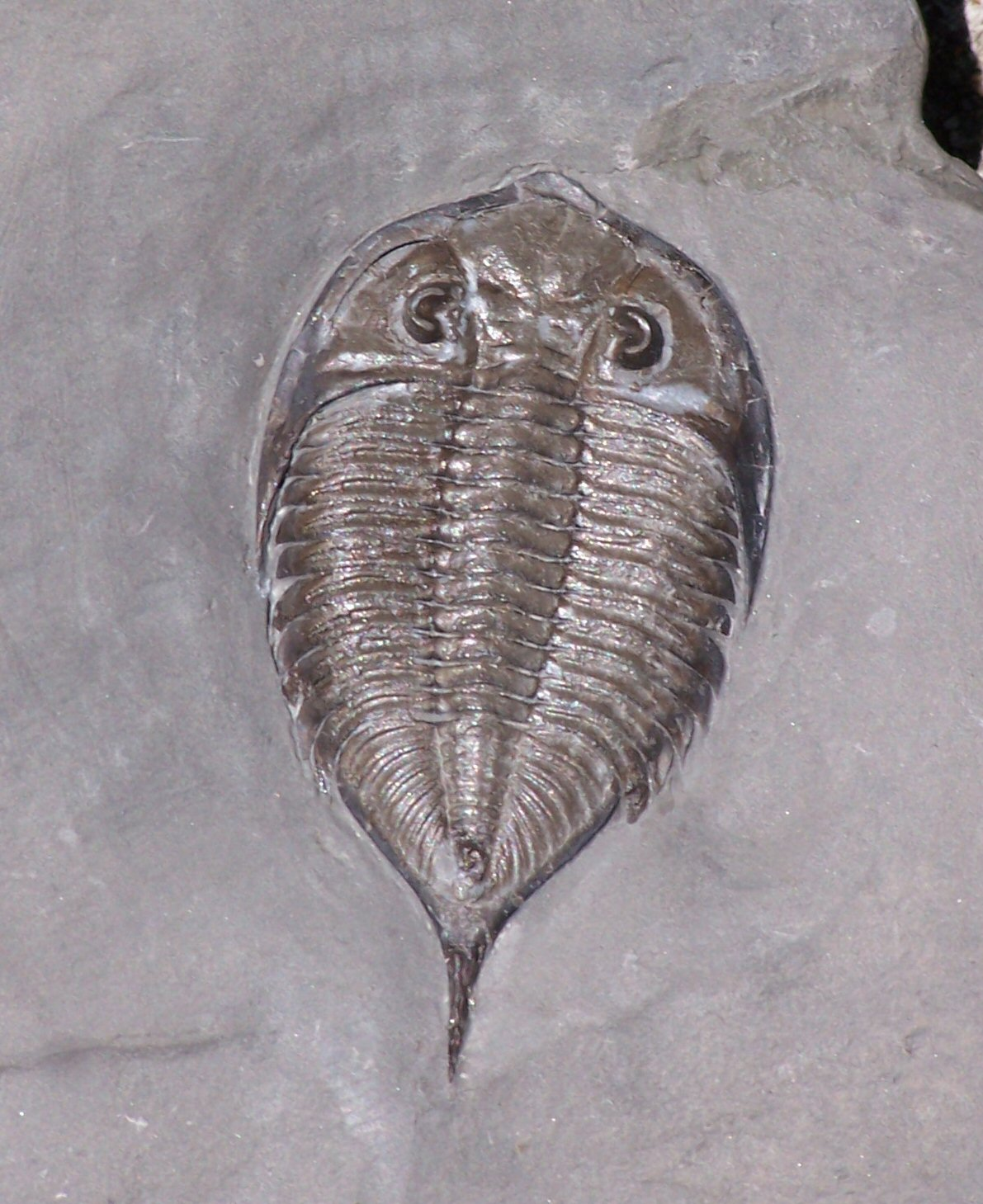
- Fossil of the Late Ordovician-Middle Devonian trilobite Dalmanites
  †Dalmanites
  - †Dalmanites retusus
  - †Dalmanites verrucosus
  - †Dalmanites vigilans
- †Dapsilodus
  - †Dapsilodus obliquicostatus
  - †Dapsilodus praecipuus
  - †Dapsilodus sparsus
- †Dasyporella
- †Dawsonoceras
- †Decaschisma
  - †Decaschisma lorae
  - †Decaschisma pulchellum
- †Deceptrix
- †Decoriconus
  - †Decoriconus fragilis
- †Dekayella
  - †Dekayella foliacea
  - †Dekayella praenuntia
  - †Dekayella ridleyana
  - †Dekayella trentonensis
  - †Dekayella ulrichi
- †Deliablastus
  - †Deliablastus cumberlandensis
- †Delthyris
  - †Delthyris perlamellosa
- †Dendrocrinus
- †Dermatostroma
  - †Dermatostroma cavernosum
  - †Dermatostroma scabra
  - †Dermatostroma tyronensis
- †Diabolirhynchia
  - †Diabolirhynchia acinus
- †Dianulites
  - †Dianulites petropolitanus – or unidentified comparable form
- †Diceromyonia
  - †Diceromyonia tersa
- †Dichocrinus
- †Dicoelosia
  - †Dicoelosia varica
- †Dicranopora
  - †Dicranopora fragilis
- †Dielasma
- †Dimerocrinites
  - †Dimerocrinites carleyi
  - †Dimerocrinites inornatus
  - †Dimerocrinites occidentalis
- †Dimorphichnus
- †Dinorthis
  - †Dinorthis carleyi
  - †Dinorthis pectinella
  - †Dinorthis proavita
  - †Dinorthis retrorsa
- †Diploclema
- †Diplotrypa
  - †Diplotrypa catenulata
  - †Diplotrypa dubia
- †Distomodus
  - †Distomodus staurognathoides
- †Dolatocrinus
  - †Dolatocrinus helderbergianus
- †Doleroides
- †Dolichoharpes
- †Doraclatum
- †Doraclotum
- †Dorytreta
- †Douglasocaris
  - †Douglasocaris collinsi
- †Drepanella
  - †Drepanella ampla
  - †Drepanella elongata
  - †Drepanella macra
- †Dunderbergia – tentative report
- †Dystactospongia
  - †Dystactospongia insolens
  - †Dystactospongia minor

== E ==
- †Eatonia
  - †Eatonia tennesseensis
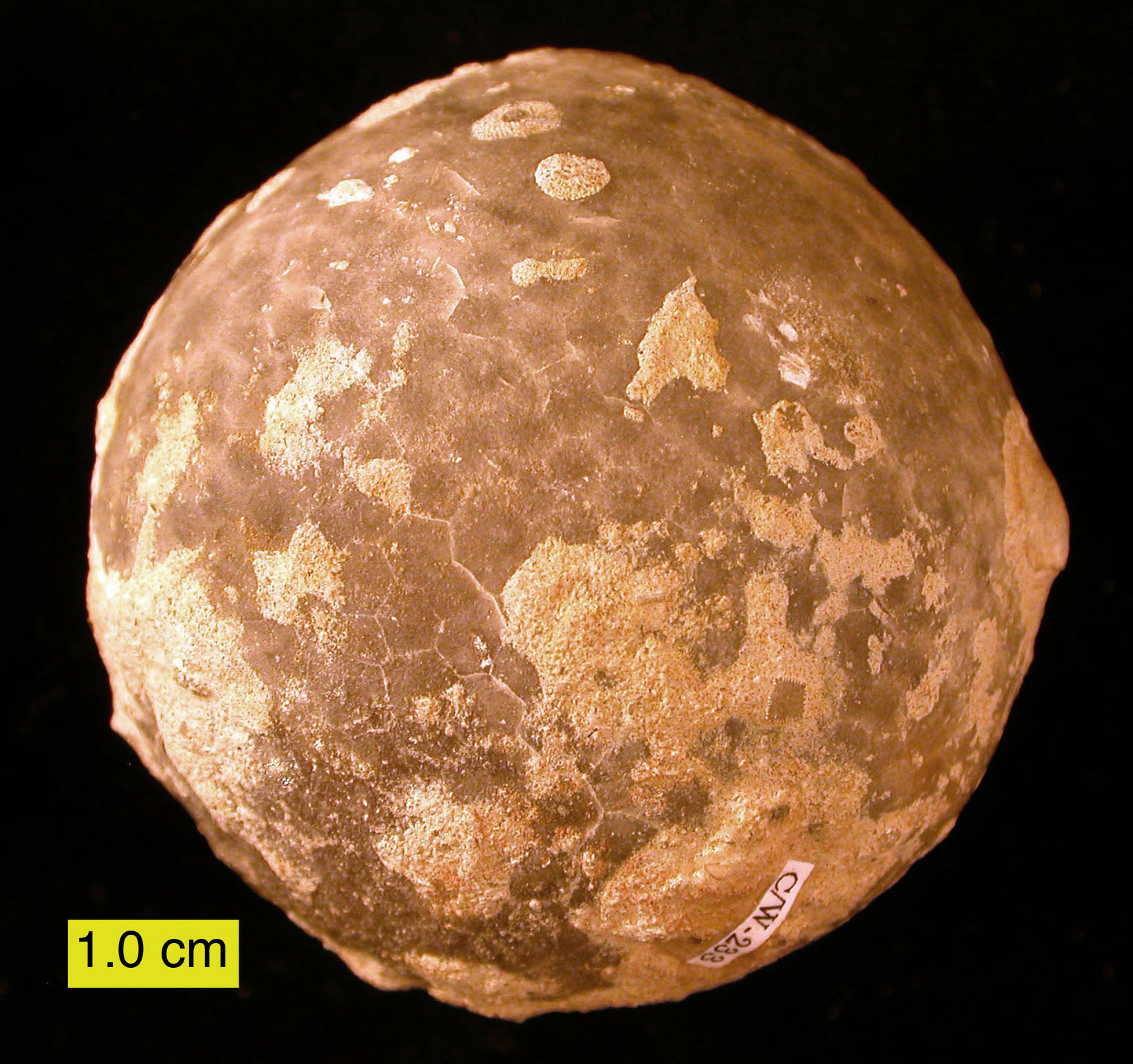
- Fossil of the Early-Middle Ordovician cystoid echinoderm Echinosphaerites
  †Echinosphaerites
- †Ectenoglossa
- †Ectomaria
  - †Ectomaria adventa – type locality for species
  - †Ectomaria prisca
- †Edriocrinus
- †Elliptoglossa
- †Endocycloceras
  - †Endocycloceras perannulatum
- †Enterolasma
  - †Enterolasma strictum
- †Eodictyonella (formerly Dictyonella)
  - †Eodictyonella gibbosa
  - †Eodictyonella reticulata
- †Eohalysiocrinus
  - †Eohalysiocrinus stigmatus
  - †Eohalysiocrinus type locality for species 1 – informal
  - †Eohalysiocrinus type locality for species 2 – informal
- †Eoleperditia
- †Eoplectodonta
- †Eospirifer
  - †Eospirifer radiatus
- †Eotomaria
  - †Eotomaria canalifera
  - †Eotomaria dryope
  - †Eotomaria labiosa
- †Eremotrema
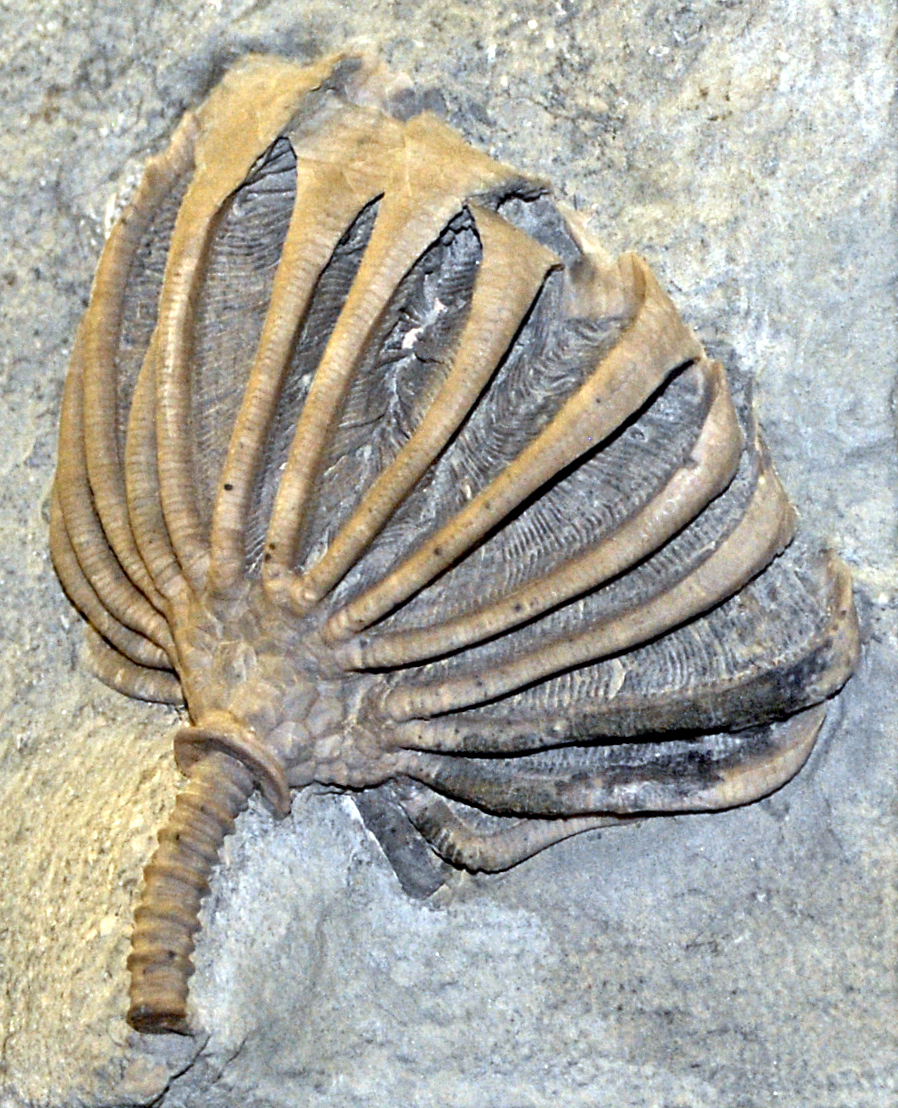
- Fossilized calyx and partial stem of the Carboniferous crinoid ("sea lily") Eretmocrinus
  †Eretmocrinus
  - †Eretmocrinus magnificus
- †Eridotrypa
  - †Eridotrypa aedilis
  - †Eridotrypa briareus
  - †Eridotrypa mutabilis
- †Escharopora
  - †Escharopora angularis
  - †Escharopora briareus
  - †Escharopora confluens
  - †Escharopora falciformis
  - †Escharopora libana
  - †Escharopora maculata – or unidentified comparable form
  - †Escharopora pavonia
  - †Escharopora ramosa
  - †Escharopora subramosa
  - †Escharopora subrecta
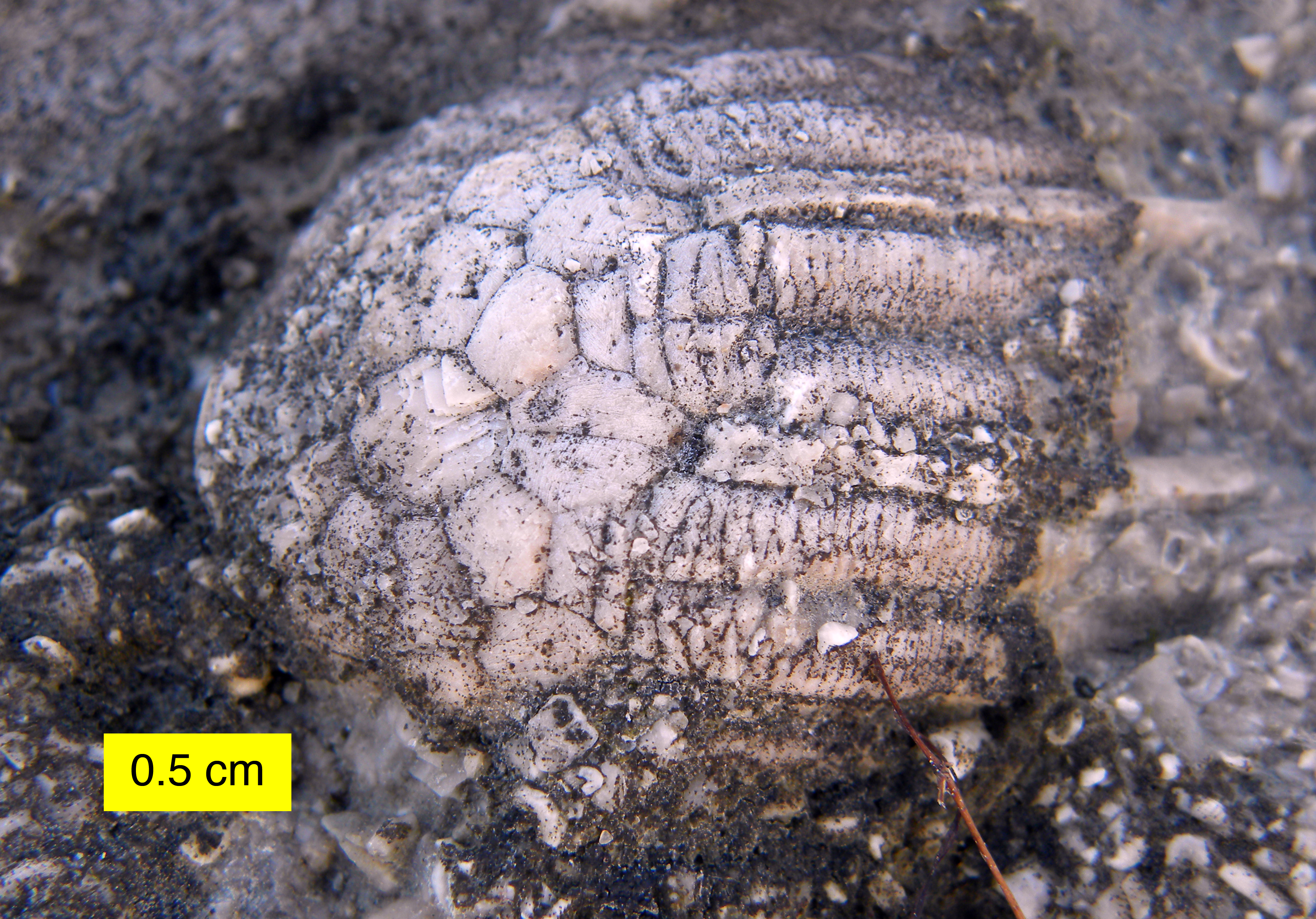
- Fossilized calyx of the Silurian-Middle Devonian crinoid ("sea lily") Eucalyptocrinites
  †Eucalyptocrinites
  - †Eucalyptocrinites caelatus
  - †Eucalyptocrinites crassus
- †Eucladocrinus
  - †Eucladocrinus millebrachiatus
- †Eumorphocystis – tentative report
- †Eunema
  - †Eunema centralis
- †Euomphalopsis
  - †Euomphalopsis involuta
- †Eurychilina
  - †Eurychilina aequalis
  - †Eurychilina subradiata
- †Eurydictya
- †Euryoblastus
  - †Euryoblastus veryi
- †Eutrochoceras

== F ==
- †Fascifera
  - †Fascifera stonensis
- †Favistella
- †Favositella
  - †Favositella epidermata
- †Favosites
  - †Favosites conicus
  - †Favosites forbesi
  - †Favosites spinigerus
- †Fenestella
- †Fletcheria
  - †Fletcheria incerta
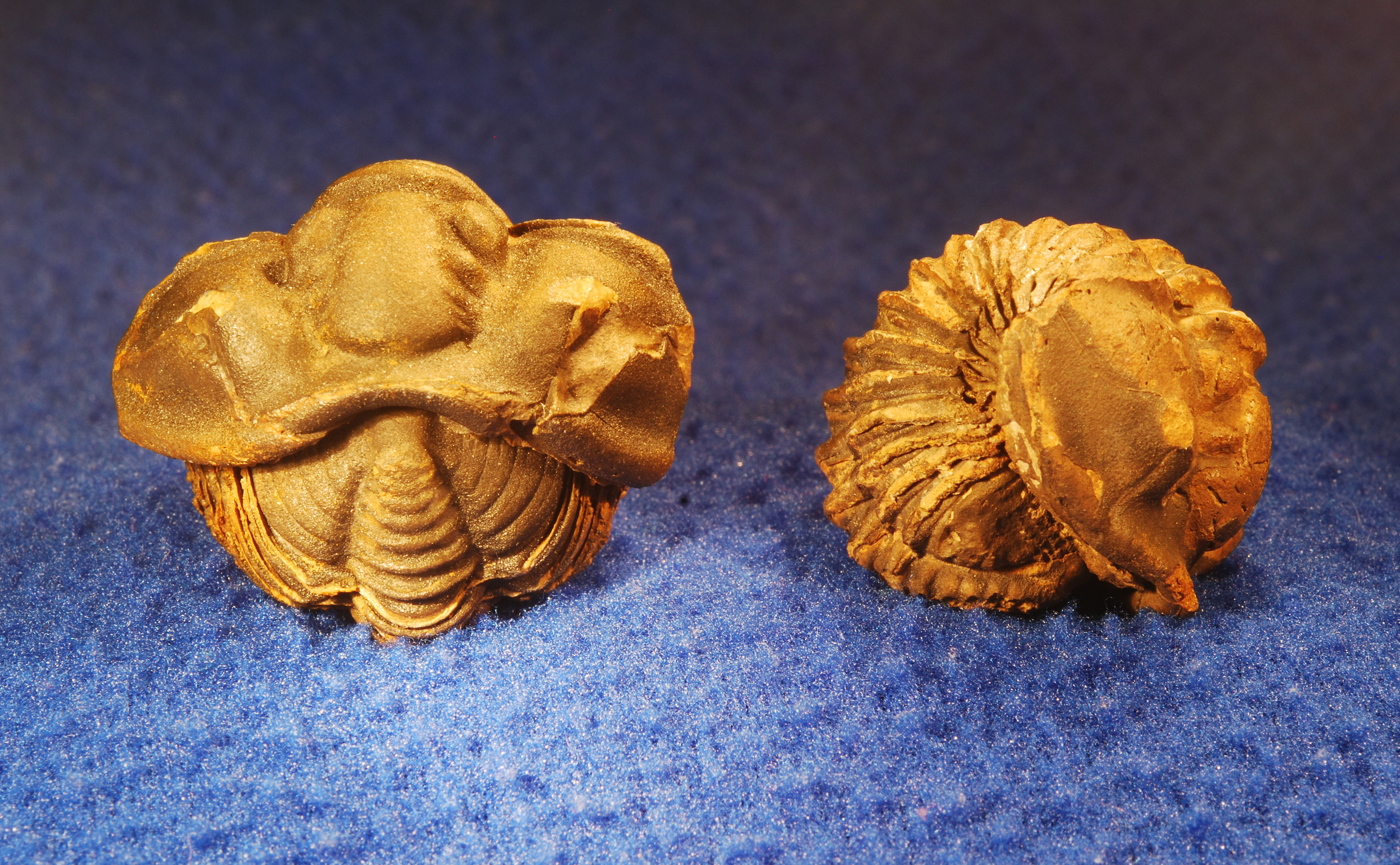
- Front (left) and right side (right) views of an enrolled fossil of the Middle Ordovician-Silurian trilobite Flexicalymene
  †Flexicalymene
  - †Flexicalymene meeki
  - †Flexicalymene senaria
- †Foerstecystis
  - †Foerstecystis obliqua
- †Foerstephyllum
- †Foerstia
  - †Foerstia ohioensis
- †Forbesiocrinus
  - †Forbesiocrinus wortheni

== G ==
- †Gasconadia
  - †Gasconadia putilla
- †Gaulocrinus
  - †Gaulocrinus bordeni
  - †Gaulocrinus veryi
- †Geniculifera
- †Geraocrinus
  - †Geraocrinus sculptus
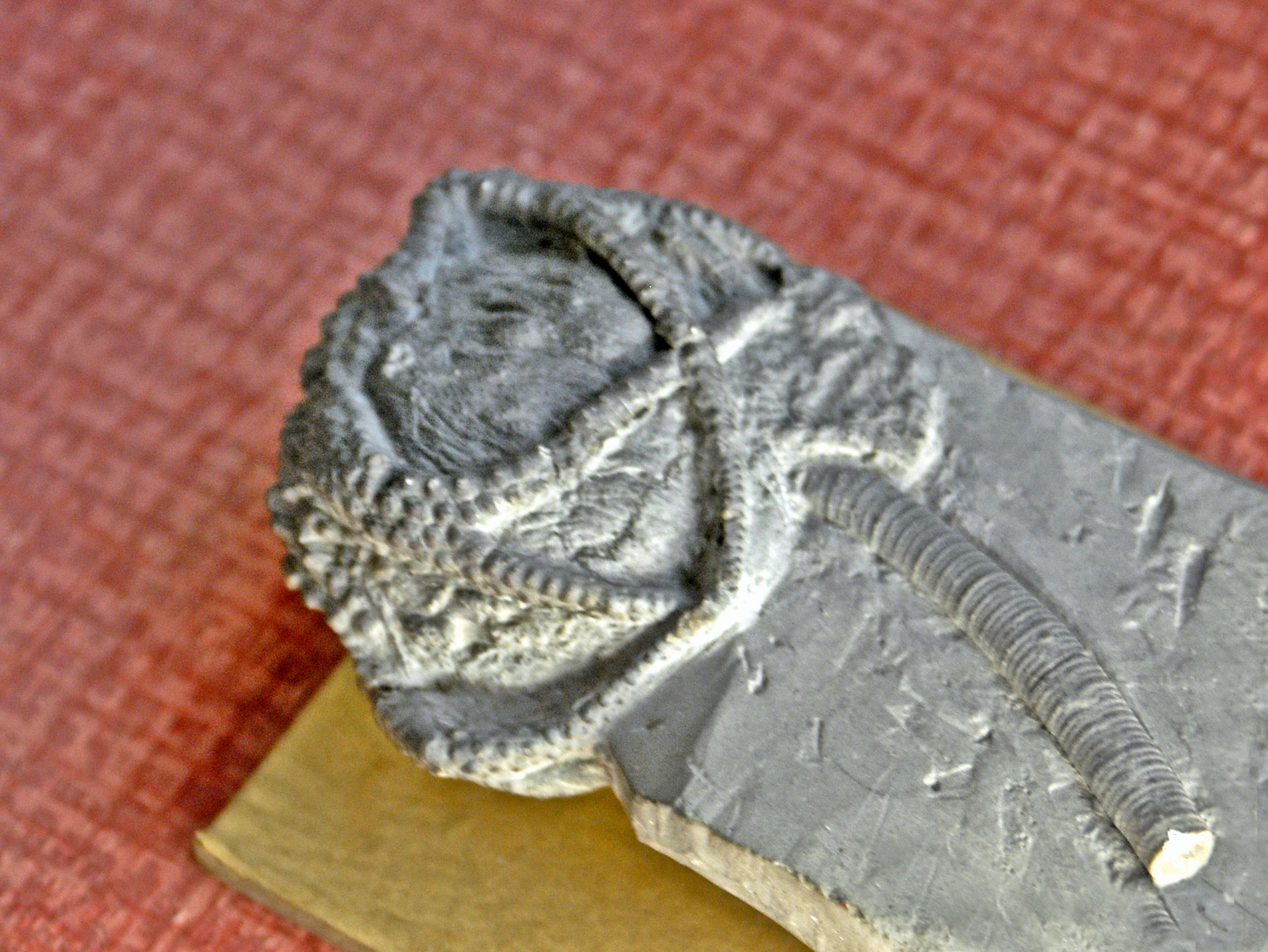
- Fossilized calyx and partial stem of the Devonian-Carboniferous crinoid ("sea lily") Gilbertsocrinus
  †Gilbertsocrinus
  - †Gilbertsocrinus tuberosus
- †Ginkgospongia
  - †Ginkgospongia foliata
- †Girvanella
- †Glyphaspis – tentative report
- †Glyptocrinus
  - †Glyptocrinus decadactylus
  - †Glyptocrinus subglobosus
- †Glyptograptus
- †Glyptorthis
  - †Glyptorthis assimilis
  - †Glyptorthis bellarugosa
  - †Glyptorthis insculpta
  - †Glyptorthis irregularis – type locality for species
  - †Glyptorthis maquoketensis
- †Gonioceras
  - †Gonioceras anceps
  - †Gonioceras occidentale
- †Goniotrypa
  - †Goniotrypa bilateralis
- †Graphiadactyllis
  - †Graphiadactyllis lineata
- †Graptodicta
  - †Graptodicta fruticosa
- †Graptodictya
  - †Graptodictya dendroidea
  - †Graptodictya provia
- †Gravicalymene
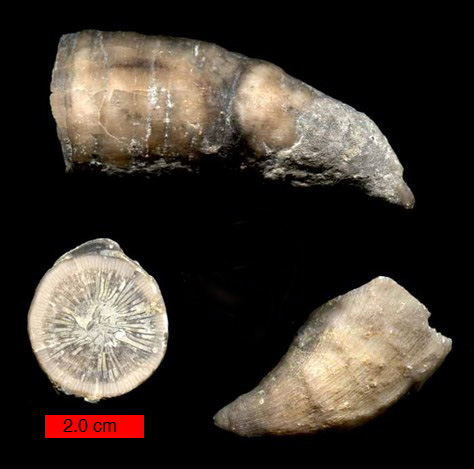
- Multiple views of a fossil of the Ordovician horn coral Grewingkia
  †Grewingkia
  - †Grewingkia canadensis
- †Griffithidella
- †Grifithidella
- †Gypidula

== H ==
- †Hadroblastus
- †Hagnocrinus
  - †Hagnocrinus crenus – type locality for species
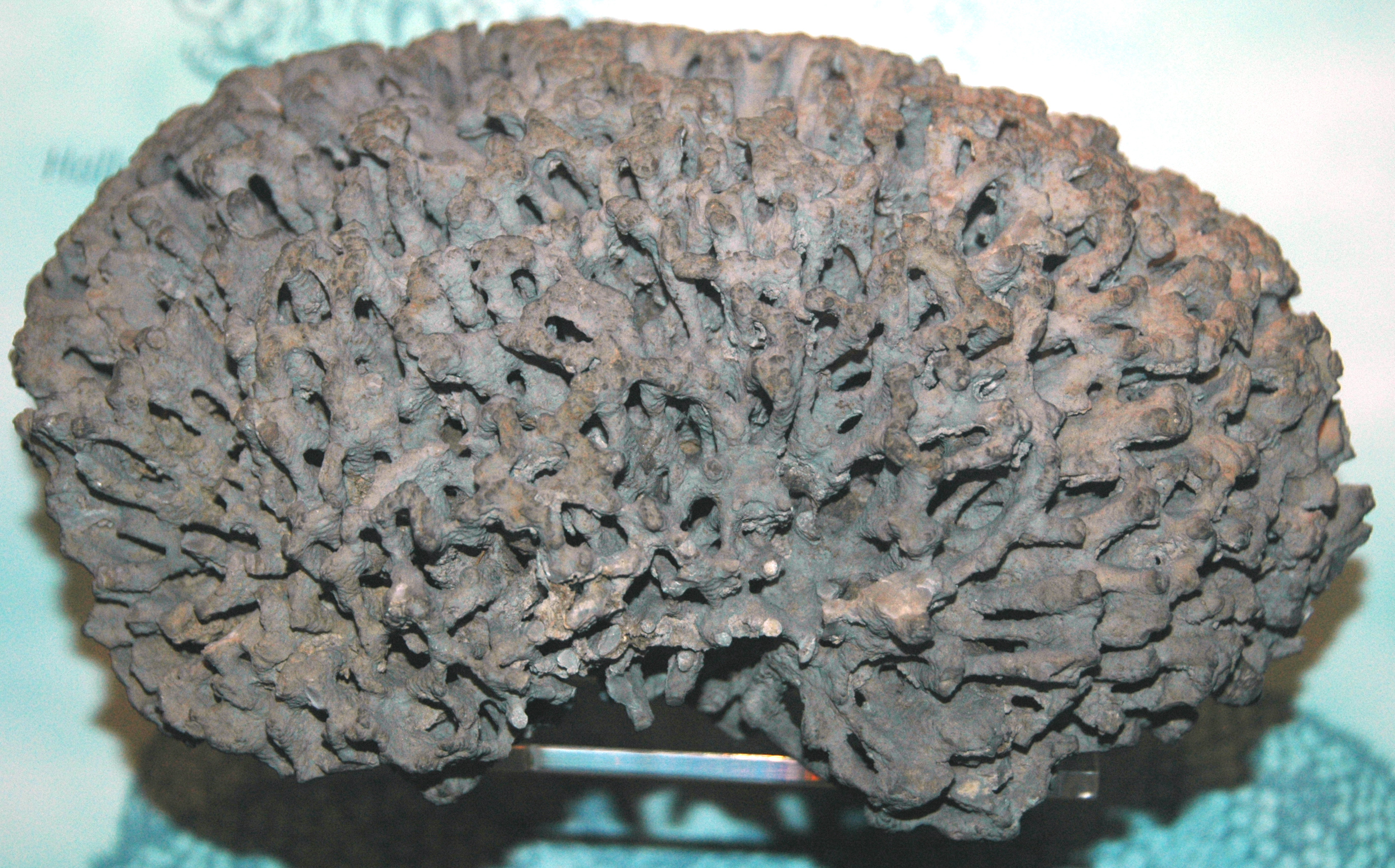
- Fossil of the Ordovician bryozoan ("moss animal") Hallopora
  †Hallopora
  - †Hallopora angularis
  - †Hallopora dalei
  - †Hallopora dumalis
  - †Hallopora florencia
  - †Hallopora multitabulata
  - †Hallopora onealli
  - †Hallopora pulchella
  - †Hallopora ramosa
  - †Hallopora rugosa
  - †Hallopora spissata
- †Halysiocrinus
  - †Halysiocrinus cumberlandensis
  - †Halysiocrinus tunicatus
- †Haplistion
  - †Haplistion lobatum
- †Hebertella
  - †Hebertella frankfortensis
  - †Hebertella occidentalis
  - †Hebertella sinuata
- †Hedeina
  - †Hedeina eudora
- †Hedstroemia
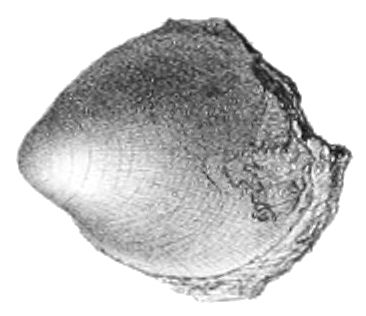
- Fossilized shell of the Silurian mollusc Helcionopsis
  †Helcionopsis
  - †Helcionopsis striata
- †Helicelasma
  - †Helicelasma rusticum
- †Helicotoma
  - †Helicotoma declivis
  - †Helicotoma granosa
  - †Helicotoma planulatoides
  - †Helicotoma subquadrata
  - †Helicotoma tennesseensis
- †Helopora
  - †Helopora spiniformis
- †Hemidictya
  - †Hemidictya lebanonensis
- †Hemiphragma
  - †Hemiphragma irrasum
  - †Hemiphragma ottawaensis
- †Hesperorthis
  - †Hesperorthis australis
  - †Hesperorthis tricenaria
- †Heterorthis
  - †Heterorthis clytie
- †Heterospongia
  - †Heterospongia subramosa
- †Heterotrypa
  - †Heterotrypa echinata
  - †Heterotrypa exovaria
  - †Heterotrypa frondosa
  - †Heterotrypa magnopora
  - †Heterotrypa parulipora
  - †Heterotrypa parvulipora
  - †Heterotrypa patera
  - †Heterotrypa praenuntia
  - †Heterotrypa rugosa
  - †Heterotrypa simplex
  - †Heterotrypa solitaria
  - †Heterotrypa stonensis
  - †Heterotrypa subpulchella
  - †Heterotrypa subramosa
  - †Heterotrypa subtrentonensis
  - †Heterotrypa tuberculata
- †Hexacrinites
- †Hibbertia
- †Hindia
  - †Hindia parva
  - †Hindia sphaeroidalis
- †Hiscobeccus
  - †Hiscobeccus capax
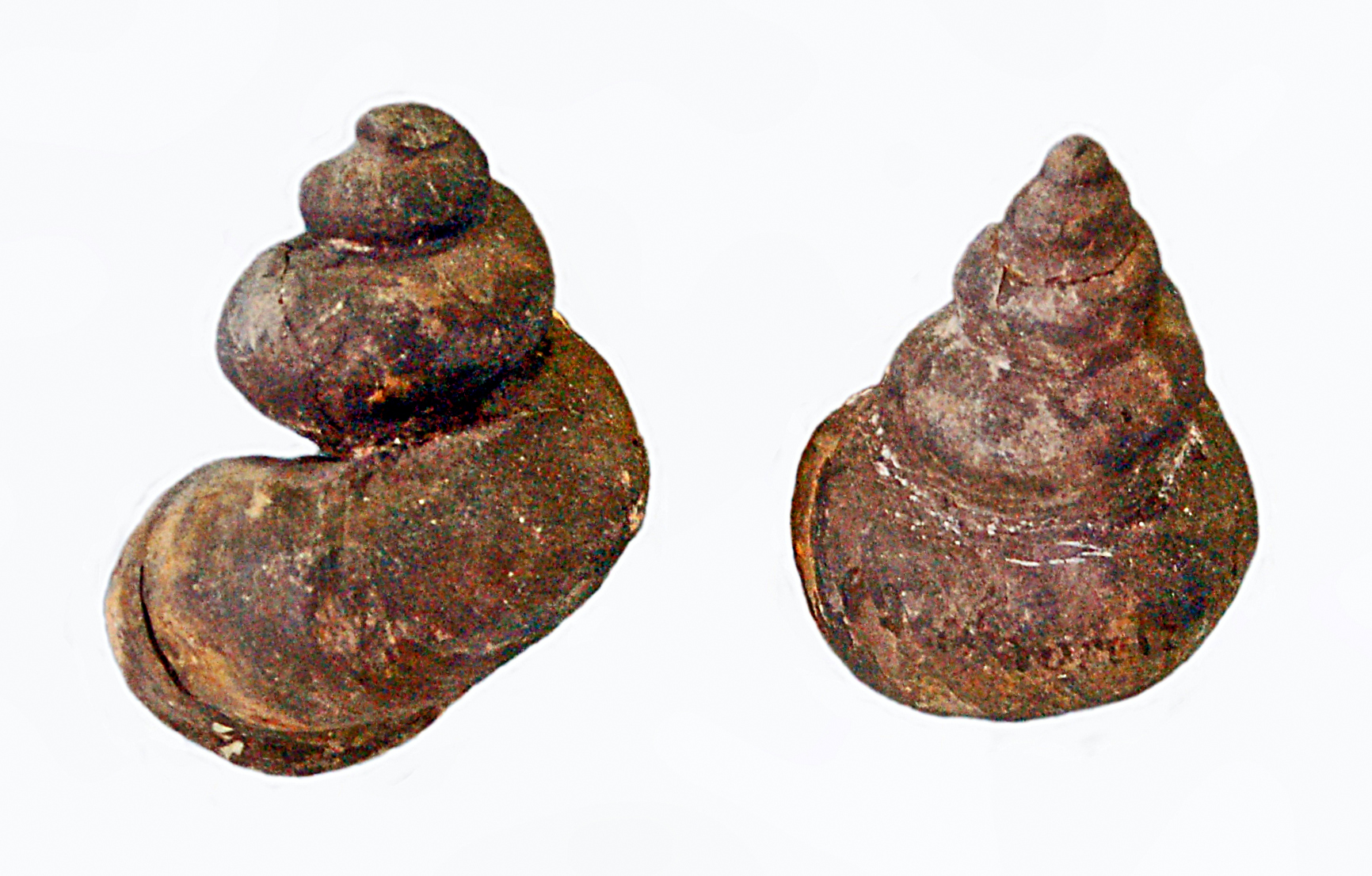
- Fossilized shells of the Ordovician-Carboniferous sea snail Holopea
  †Holopea
- †Homoeospira
  - †Homoeospira evax
- †Homotrypa
  - †Homotrypa arbuscula
  - †Homotrypa callosa
  - †Homotrypa centralis
  - †Homotrypa curvata
  - †Homotrypa flabellaris
  - †Homotrypa grandis
  - †Homotrypa minnesotensis
  - †Homotrypa similis
  - †Homotrypa subramosa
  - †Homotrypa tabulata
  - †Homotrypa tuberculata
- †Homotrypella
  - †Homotrypella hospitalis
  - †Homotrypella nodosa
- †Hormotoma
  - †Hormotoma columbiana
  - †Hormotoma gracilis
- †Howellella
  - †Howellella crispa – or unidentified comparable form
- †Hudsonaster
  - †Hudsonaster narrowayi
- †Hustedia

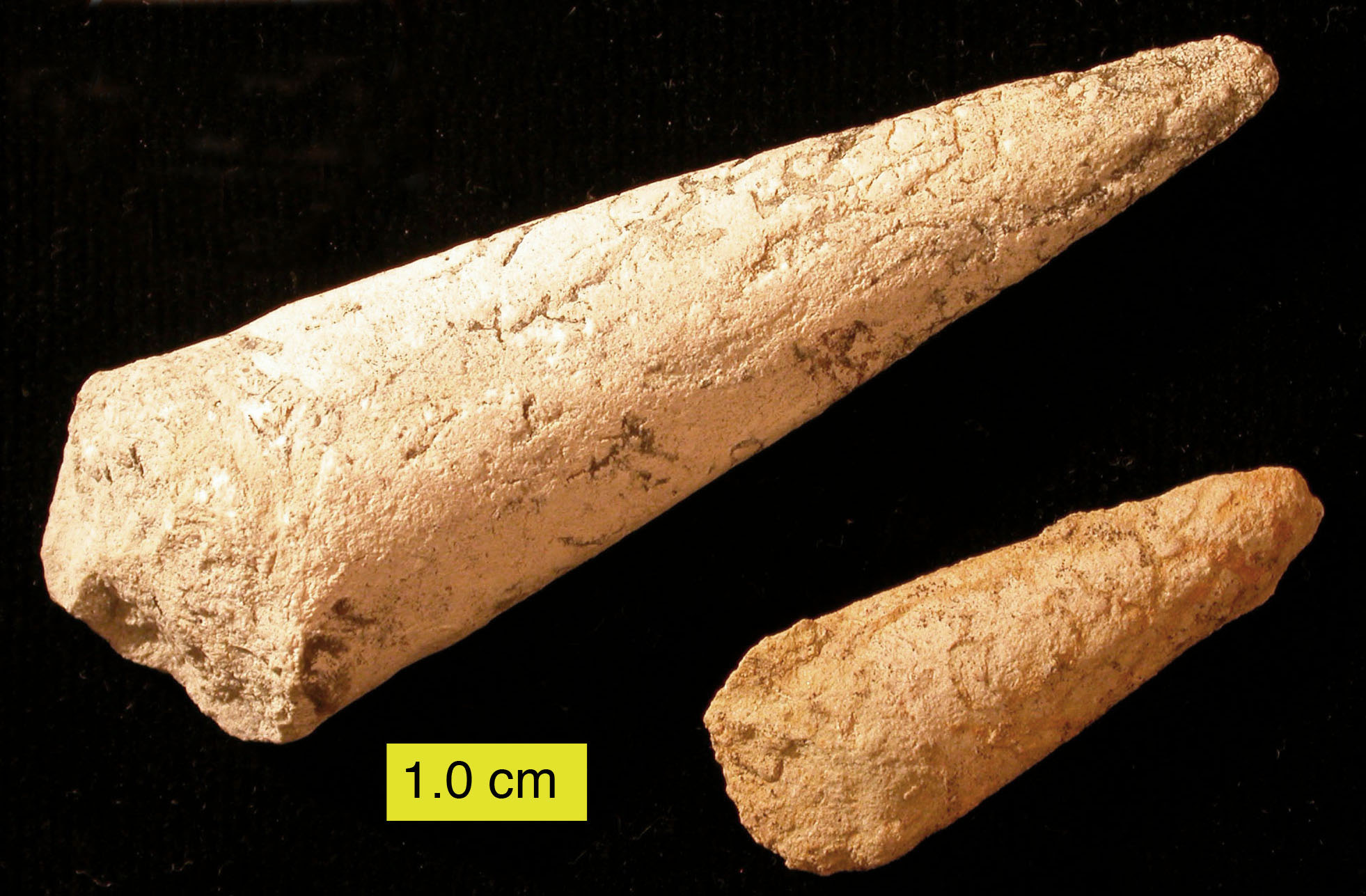
Fossilized shells of the Cambrian-Permian brachiopod relative Hyolitha

†Hyolithes

  - †Hyolithes newsomensis

== I ==
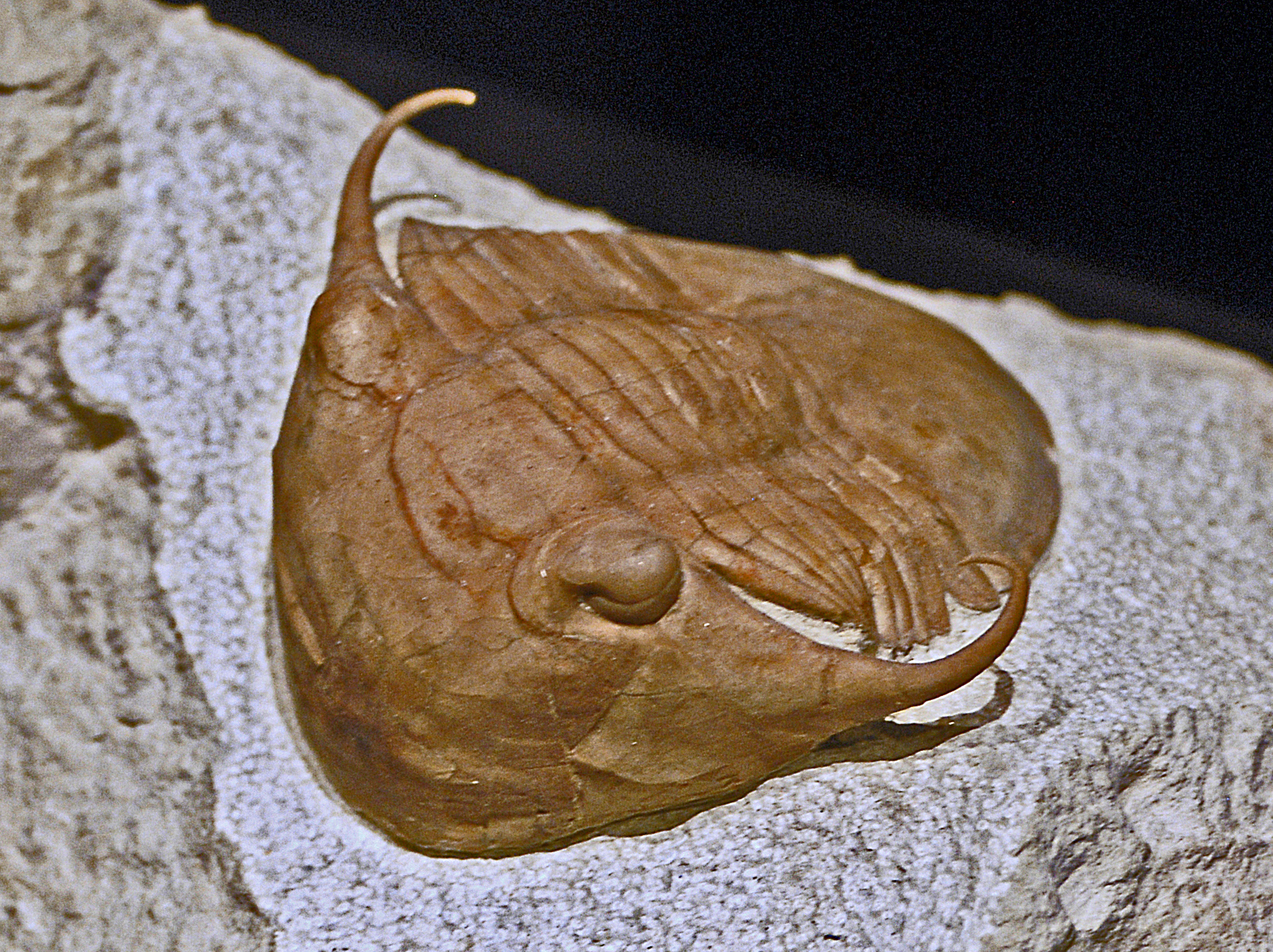
- Fossil of the Middle Ordovician trilobite Illaenus
  †Illaenus
- †Ischadites
  - †Ischadites turbinatus – or unidentified comparable form
- †Isochilina
  - †Isochilina ampla
  - †Isochilina columbiana
  - †Isochilina jonesi
  - †Isochilina saffordi
- †Isophragma
  - †Isophragma extensum
  - †Isophragma subabbreviatum – type locality for species
- †Isorthis
  - †Isorthis pygmaea
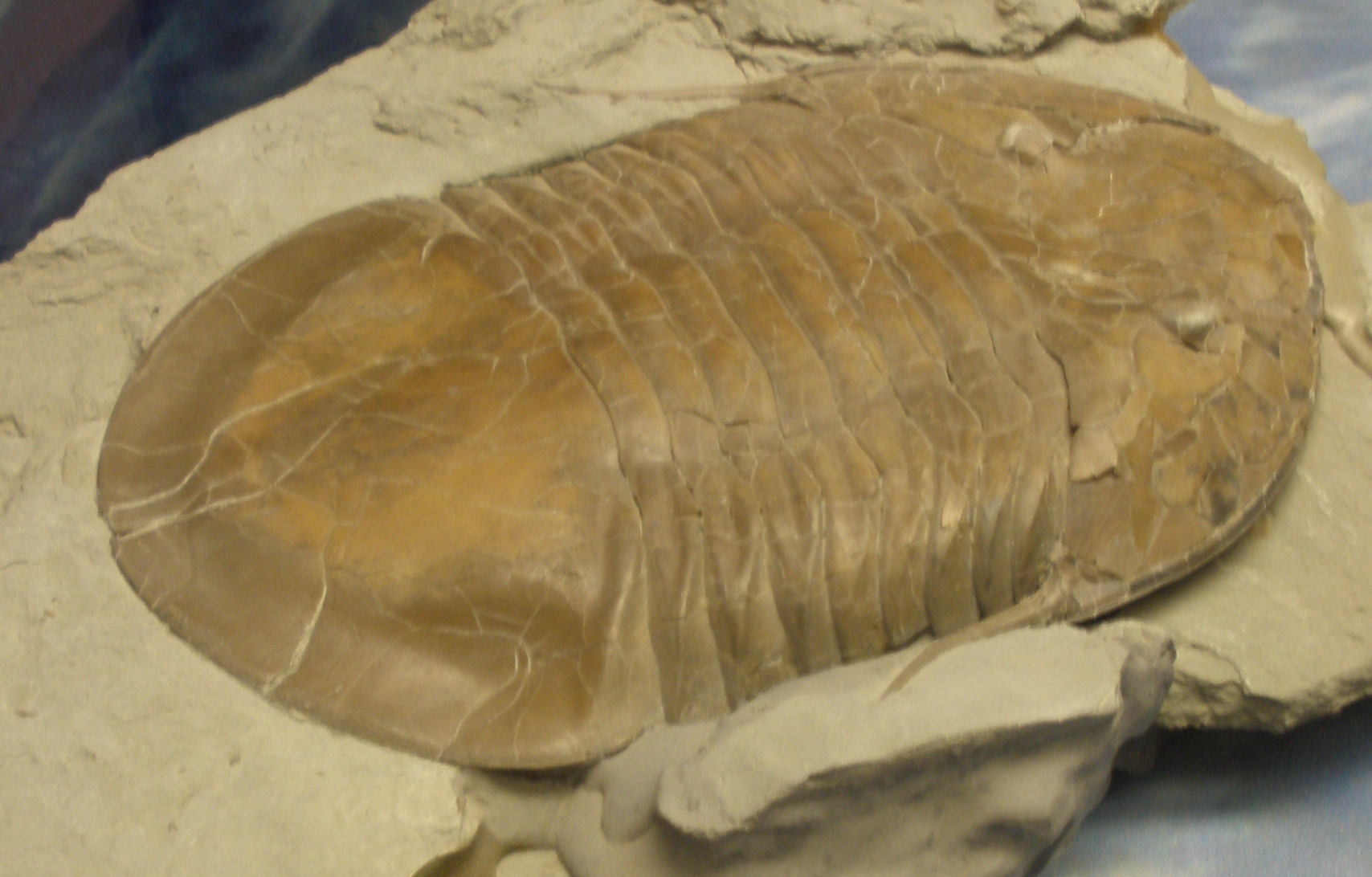
- Fossil of the Middle-Late Ordovician giant trilobite Isotelus.
  †Isotelus

== K ==
- †Kallimorphocrinus
- †Kallimorrhocrinus
- †Kirkbya
  - †Kirkbya fernglepensis
- †Kirkbyella
- †Kloedenia
  - †Kloedenia praenuntia
- †Kockelella
  - †Kockelella amsdeni
  - †Kockelella ortus
  - †Kockelella ranuliformis
  - †Kockelella stauros
  - †Kockelella variabilis
  - †Kockelella walliseri
- †Krausella
  - †Krausella arcuata

== L ==
- †Labriproductus – tentative report
- †Lambeophyllum
  - †Lambeophyllum profundum
- †Lampadosocrinus
- †Lampterocrinus
- †Leangella
  - †Leangella tennesseensis
- †Lecanocrinus
  - †Lecanocrinus pusilla
  - †Lecanocrinus pusillus
- †Leiochonetes
- †Leperditella
  - †Leperditella tumida
- †Leperditia
  - †Leperditia appressa
  - †Leperditia appresso
  - †Leperditia columbiana
  - †Leperditia fabulites
  - †Leperditia pondi
  - †Leperditia tumidula
- †Lepidocoleus
- †Lepidocyclus
  - †Lepidocyclus manniensis
- †Leptaena
  - †Leptaena moniquensis
  - †Leptaena rhomboidalis
  - †Leptaena richmondensis
- †Leptaenisca
  - †Leptaenisca concava
- †Leptellina
- †Leptostrophia
- †Lichenaria
  - †Lichenaria carterensis
  - †Lichenaria globularis
  - †Lichenaria grandis
  - †Lichenaria parva
- †Licrophycus
  - †Licrophycus libana
- †Lingulasma
  - †Lingulasma matutinum – type locality for species
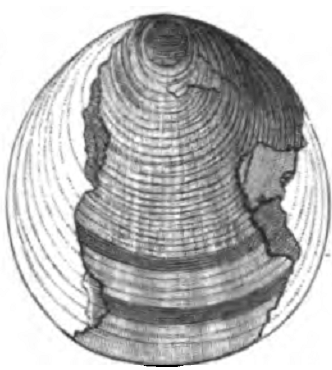
- Illustration of a fossilized shell of the Cambrian-Late Ordovician brachiopod Lingulella
  †Lingulella
- †Lingulops
  - †Lingulops cliftonensis
  - †Lingulops norwoodi
- †Lioclemella
  - †Lioclemella bifurcata
- †Liospira
  - †Liospira americana
  - †Liospira decipens
  - †Liospira progne
  - †Liospira subconcava
  - †Liospira vitruvia
- †Lissatrypa – tentative report
- †Lobomelocrinus
  - †Lobomelocrinus obconicus
  - †Lobomelocrinus rugatus
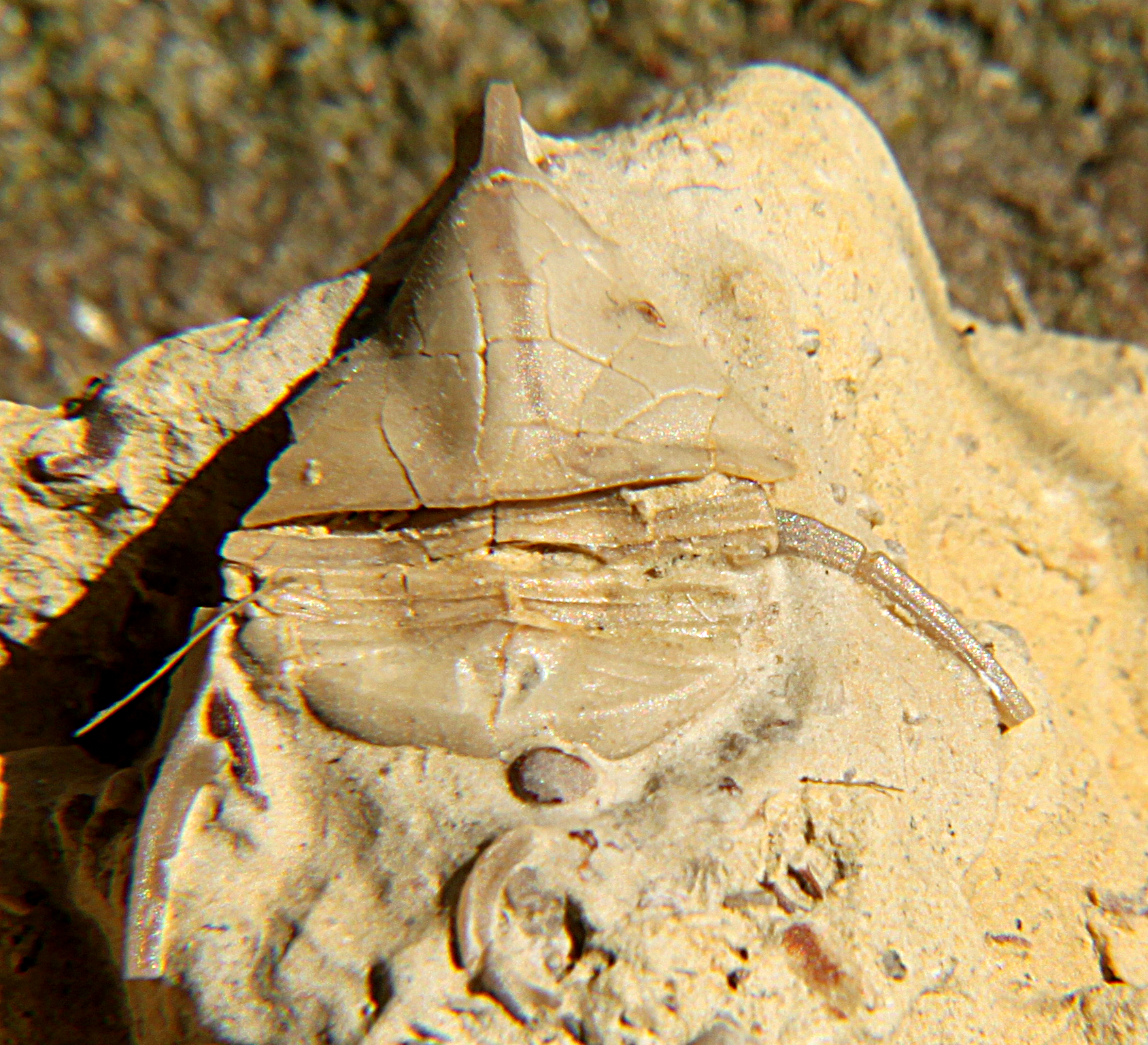
- Fossil of the Ordovician trilobite Lonchodomas
  †Lonchodomas
- †Lophospira
  - †Lophospira conoidea
  - †Lophospira milleri
  - †Lophospira obliqua
  - †Lophospira perangulata – type locality for species
  - †Lophospira producta
  - †Lophospira selecta – type locality for species
  - †Lophospira superba – type locality for species
- †Loxobucania
  - †Loxobucania emmonsi
  - †Loxobucania nashvillensis – type locality for species
- †Loxonema
- †Lyriocrinus
  - †Lyriocrinus melissa
- †Lyrodesma
- †Lytospira
  - †Lytospira undulatus

== M ==
- †Maclurina
  - †Maclurina bigsbyi
- †Macluritella
  - †Macluritella uniangulata
- †Maclurites
  - †Maclurites magnus
  - †Maclurites nitidus
- †Macrocrinus
- †Macropleura
- †Macrostylocrinus
  - †Macrostylocrinus fasciatus
  - †Macrostylocrinus striatus
- †Magnuscrinus
  - †Magnuscrinus kammeri
  - †Magnuscrinus praegravis
- †Manespira
  - †Manespira rotunda – type locality for species
- †Marginatia
- †Marsupiocrinus
- †Mauryella
  - †Mauryella mammillata
- †Meekopora
  - †Meekopora clausa – or unidentified comparable form
- †Megamyonia
  - †Megamyonia unicostata
- †Meilsonia
- †Menoieidina
- †Merista
  - †Merista nitida
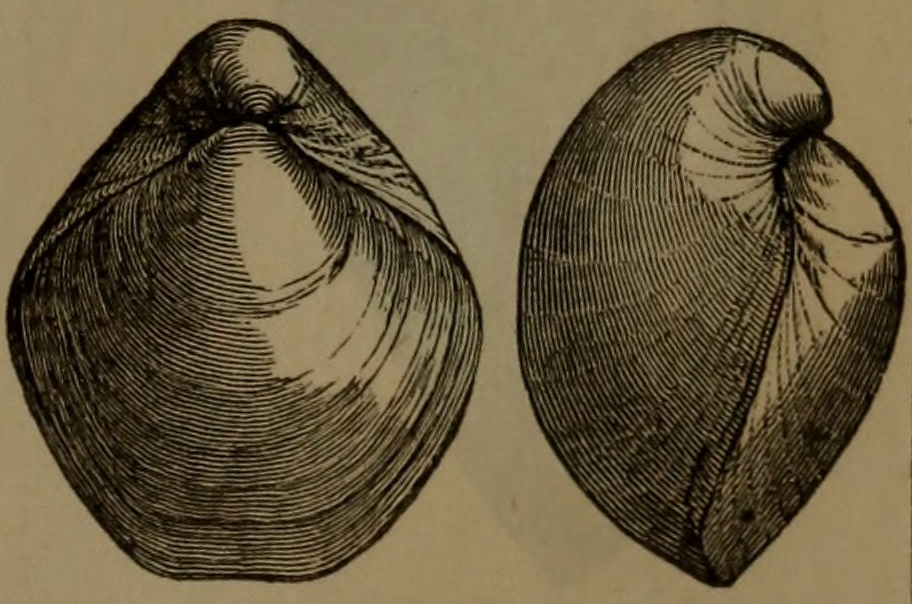
- Illustration (lower right, entry 15) of a fossilized shell in front and side views of the Silurian-Late Devonian brachiopod Meristella
  †Meristella
  - †Meristella atoka
- †Meristina
  - †Meristina maria
  - †Meristina rectirostra
- †Mesotrypa
  - †Mesotrypa angularis
  - †Mesotrypa crustulata
  - †Mesotrypa dubia
- †Mespilocrinus
  - †Mespilocrinus romingeri
- †Metichthyocrinus
  - †Metichthyocrinus clarkensis
  - †Metichthyocrinus tiaraeformis
- †Metriophyllum
  - †Metriophyllum deminutivum
  - †Metriophyllum diminutivum
- †Michelinia
- †Michellinia
- †Mimella
  - †Mimella borealis
- †Mitoclema
  - †Mitoclema cinctosum
- †Modiolodon
  - †Modiolodon ganti
  - †Modiolodon oviformis
  - †Modiolodon winchelli
- †Modiolopsis
  - †Modiolopsis consimilis – tentative report
  - †Modiolopsis modiolaris
  - †Modiolopsis truncatus
- †Monomorphichnus
- †Monotrypa
- †Monticulipora
  - †Monticulipora cincinnatiensis
  - †Monticulipora compacta
  - †Monticulipora discula
  - †Monticulipora disicula
  - †Monticulipora intersita
  - †Monticulipora mammulata
  - †Monticulipora molesta
- †Mulceodens
- †Multicostella
  - †Multicostella plena – type locality for species
- †Myelodactylus

== N ==
- †Nanillaenus
- †Nematopora
- †Nemtatopora
- †Newportopora
- †Newsomella
  - †Newsomella revolutadivaricata
  - †Newsomella ulrichi
- †Nicholsonella
  - †Nicholsonella frondifera
  - †Nicholsonella pulchra
  - †Nicholsonella vaupeli – or unidentified comparable form
- †Nipterocrinus
  - †Nipterocrinus monroensis
- †Nolichuckia
  - †Nolichuckia casteri
- †Nucelospira
  - †Nucelospira rowleyi
- †Nucleospira
  - †Nucleospira pisiformis
  - †Nucleospira rowleyi
- †Nucularca
  - †Nucularca pectunculoides
- †Nuculopsis
- †Nyctopora

== O ==
- †Oepikina
- †Omospira
  - †Omospira laticincta
- †Onychoplecia
- †Ophileta
  - †Ophileta supraplana
- †Ophiletina
  - †Ophiletina sublaxa
- †Opikina
  - †Opikina glabella
  - †Opikina speciosa
- †Orbiculoidea
  - †Orbiculoidea cellulosa
- †Orbignyella
  - †Orbignyella multitabulata
  - †Orbignyella nodosa
  - †Orbignyella sublamellosa
  - †Orbignyella wetherbyi
- †Orthambonites
- †Orthoceras
- †Orthodesma
- †Orthograptus
- †Orthorhynchula
  - †Orthorhynchula linneyi
- †Orthostrophia
  - †Orthostrophia strophomenoides
- †Ottoseetaxis
- †Ovatia
- †Ozarkodina
  - †Ozarkodina bohemica
  - †Ozarkodina confluens
  - †Ozarkodina sagitta

== P ==
- †Pachydicta
  - †Pachydicta grandis
- †Pachydictya
  - †Pachydictya foliata – or unidentified comparable form
  - †Pachydictya senilis
- †Pachystrophia
  - †Pachystrophia contiguus – type locality for species
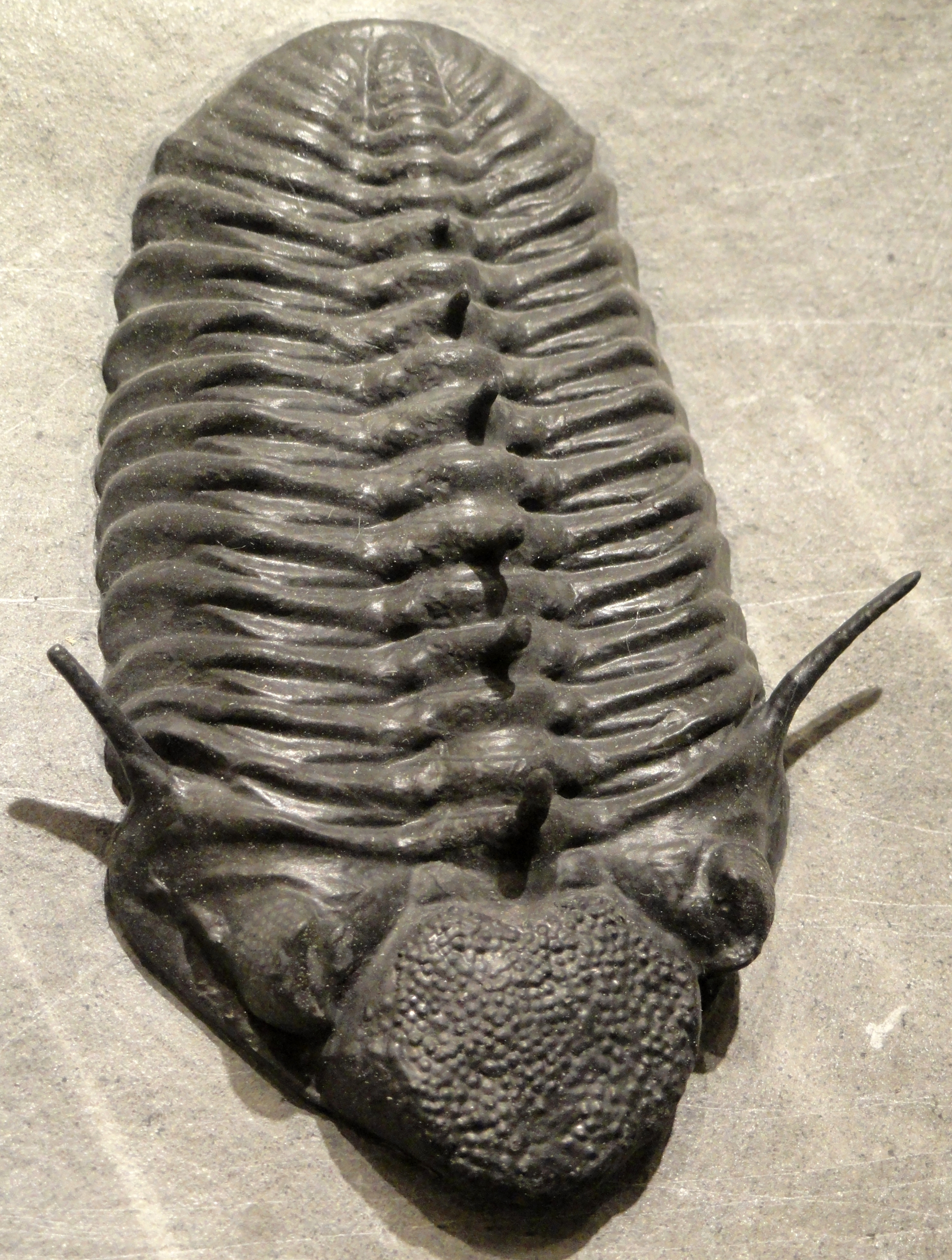
- Fossil of the trilobite Paciphacops
  †Paciphacops
  - †Paciphacops logani
- †Palaeacis
  - †Palaeacis enormis
- †Palaeocrinus
  - †Palaeocrinus sulcatus
- †Palaeophycus
- †Palaeostrophomena
  - †Palaeostrophomena superba – type locality for species
- †Paleoalveolites
- †Panderodus
  - †Panderodus panderi – tentative report
  - †Panderodus unicostatus
- †Parachaetetes – tentative report
- †Paracyrtolites
  - †Paracyrtolites subplanus
- †Paradichocrinus
  - †Paradichocrinus planus
- †Paraliospira
  - †Paraliospira abrupta – type locality for species
- †Parvohallopora
  - †Parvohallopora granda
  - †Parvohallopora pulchella
- †Passalocrinus
  - †Passalocrinus triangularis
- †Paterula
  - †Paterula perfecta
- †Paucicrura
  - †Paucicrura quadrata
- †Paupospira
  - †Paupospira bowdeni
  - †Paupospira burginensis
  - †Paupospira oweni
  - †Paupospira sumnerensis
  - †Paupospira tropidophora
- †Paurorthis
  - †Paurorthis longa
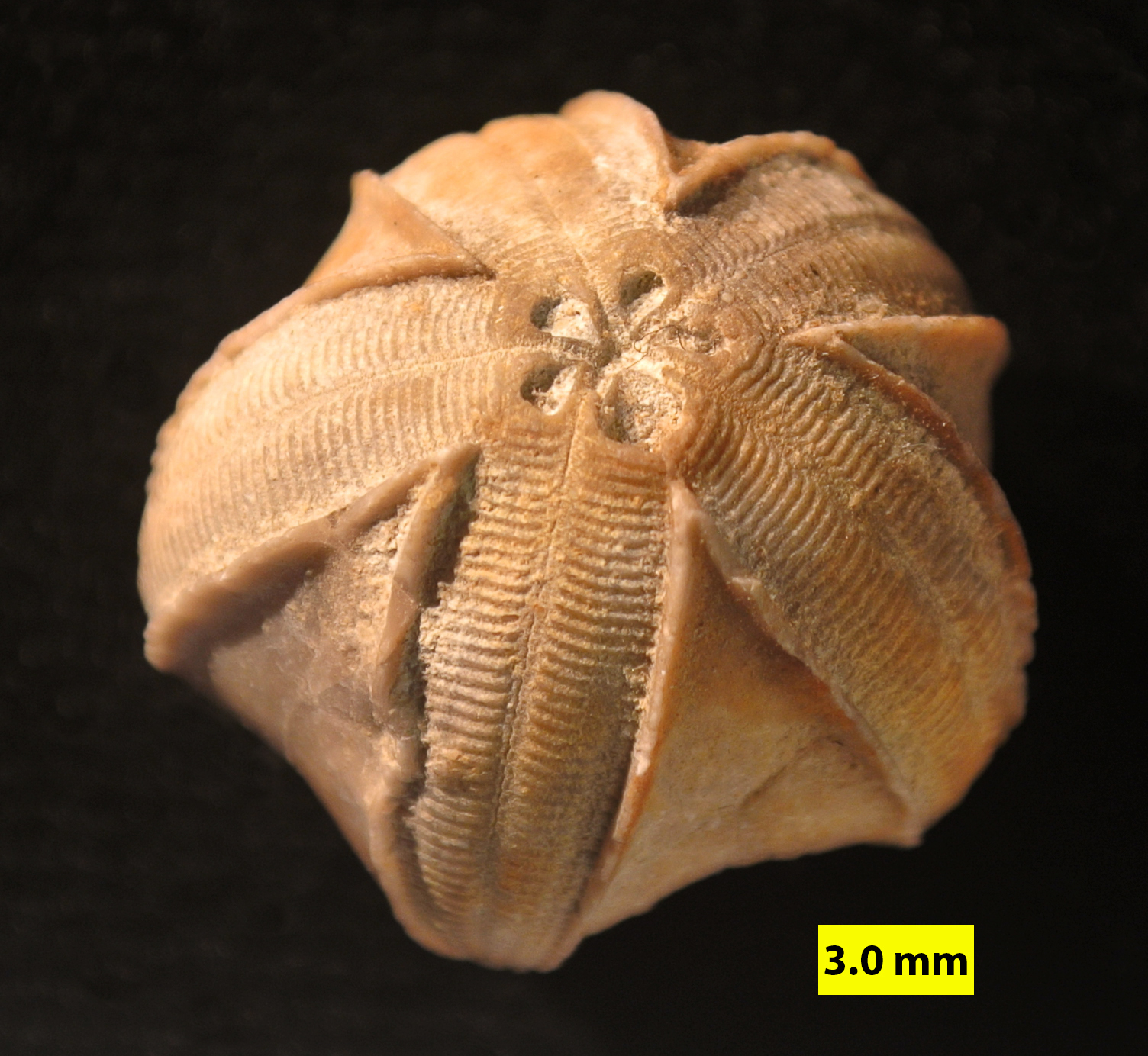
- Fossilized theca of the Carboniferous blastoid echinoderm ("sea bud") Pentremites
  †Pentremites
  - †Pentremites princetonensis
  - †Pentremites pulchellus
- †Perimecocoelia
- †Peronopora
  - †Peronopora compressa
  - †Peronopora decipiens
  - †Peronopora milleri
  - †Peronopora mundula
  - †Peronopora pavonia
  - †Peronopora weirae
- †Petalichnus
- †Petigopora
  - †Petigopora gregaria
  - †Petigopora petechialis
- †Petrocrania
  - †Petrocrania scabiosa
- †Phaenopora
- †Phanocrinus
  - †Phanocrinus sagillatus – type locality for species
- †Pharetrolites
- †Phillibole
  - †Phillibole conkini – or unidentified comparable form
- †Phimocrinus
- †Phragmolites
  - †Phragmolites cellulosus
  - †Phragmolites dyeri
  - †Phragmolites triangularis – type locality for species
- †Phycodes
- †Phyllodictya
  - †Phyllodictya frondosa
- †Phylloporina
  - †Phylloporina clathrata
  - †Phylloporina reticulata
- †Piltonia
  - †Piltonia tennesseensis
- †Pionodema
  - †Pionodema aberstadti – type locality for species
  - †Pionodema minuscula
  - †Pionodema subaequata
- †Pionomena
- †Pisocrinus
  - †Pisocrinus gemmiformis
  - †Pisocrinus quinquelobus
- †Plaesiomys
  - †Plaesiomys bellistriatus
  - †Plaesiomys proavitus
  - †Plaesiomys subquadrata
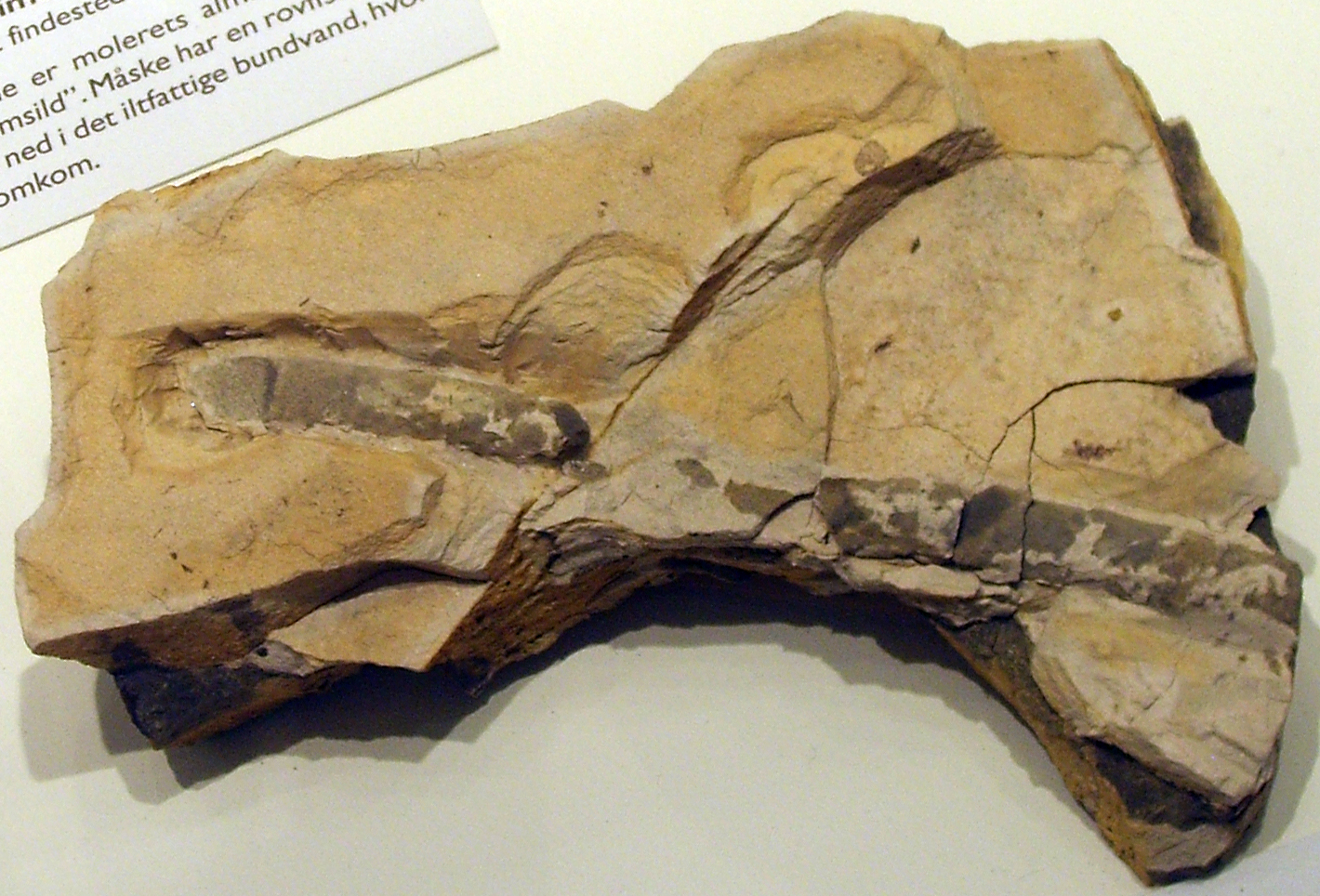
- Fossils of the burrow ichnogenus Planolites
  †Planolites
- †Platyceras – type locality for genus
  - †Platyceras nelsoni – type locality for species
  - †Platyceras niagarense
  - †Platyceras plebium
  - †Platyceras princeps – type locality for species
- †Platycrinites
  - †Platycrinites hemisphaericus
  - †Platycrinites saffordi
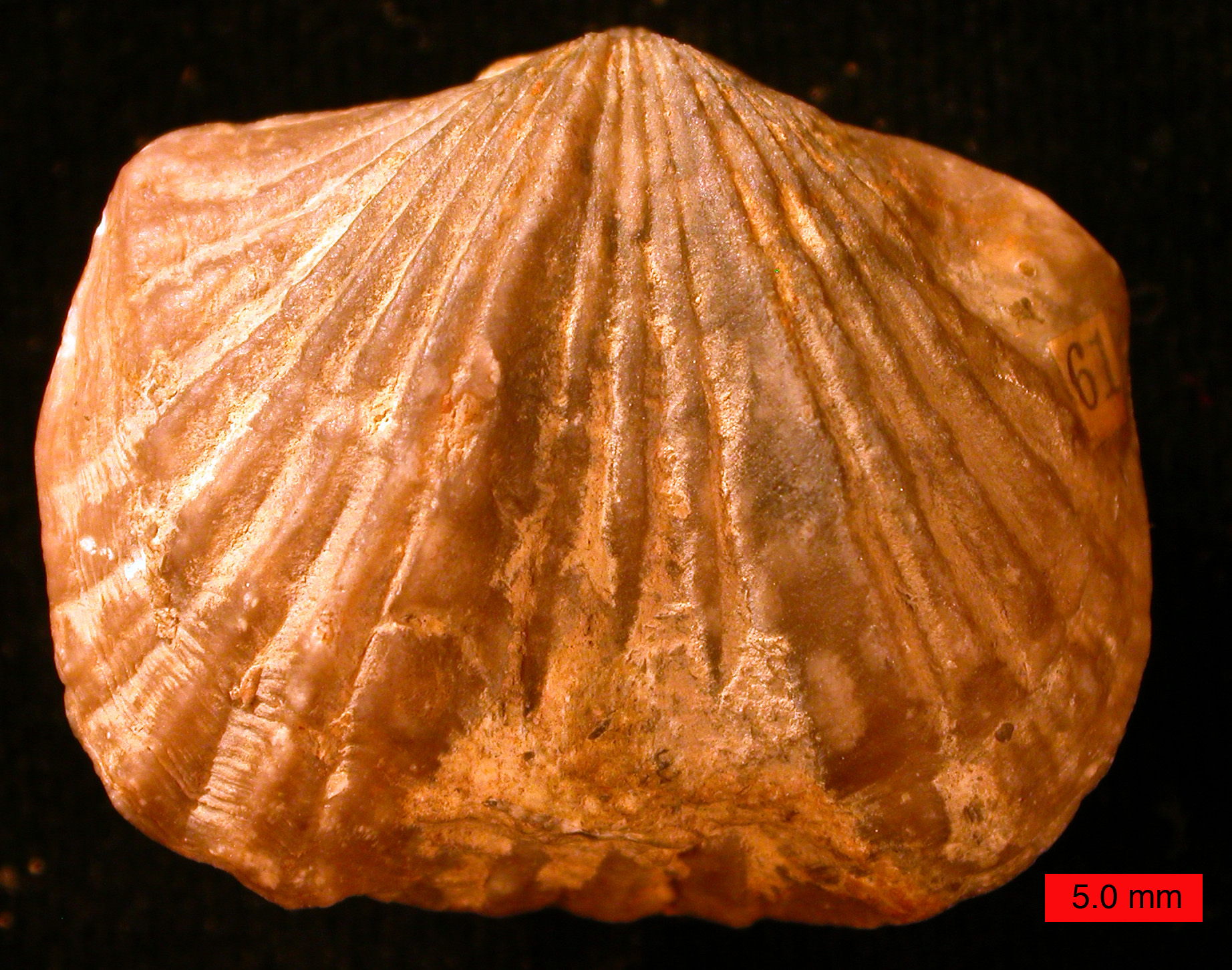
- Fossilized shell of the Middle Ordovician-Silurian brachiopod Platystrophia
  †Platystrophia
  - †Platystrophia acutilirata
  - †Platystrophia amoena
  - †Platystrophia colbiensis
  - †Platystrophia crassa
  - †Platystrophia cypha
  - †Platystrophia elegantula
  - †Platystrophia extensa
  - †Platystrophia globosa
  - †Platystrophia hermitagensis
  - †Platystrophia juvenis
  - †Platystrophia laticosta
  - †Platystrophia nitida
  - †Platystrophia ponderosa
  - †Platystrophia precursor
  - †Platystrophia strigosa
  - †Platystrophia sublaticosta
- †Plectambonites
  - †Plectambonites clarksvillensis
  - †Plectambonites saxea
  - †Plectambonites sericeus
- †Plectoceras
  - †Plectoceras bondi
- †Plectorthis
- †Plectospira
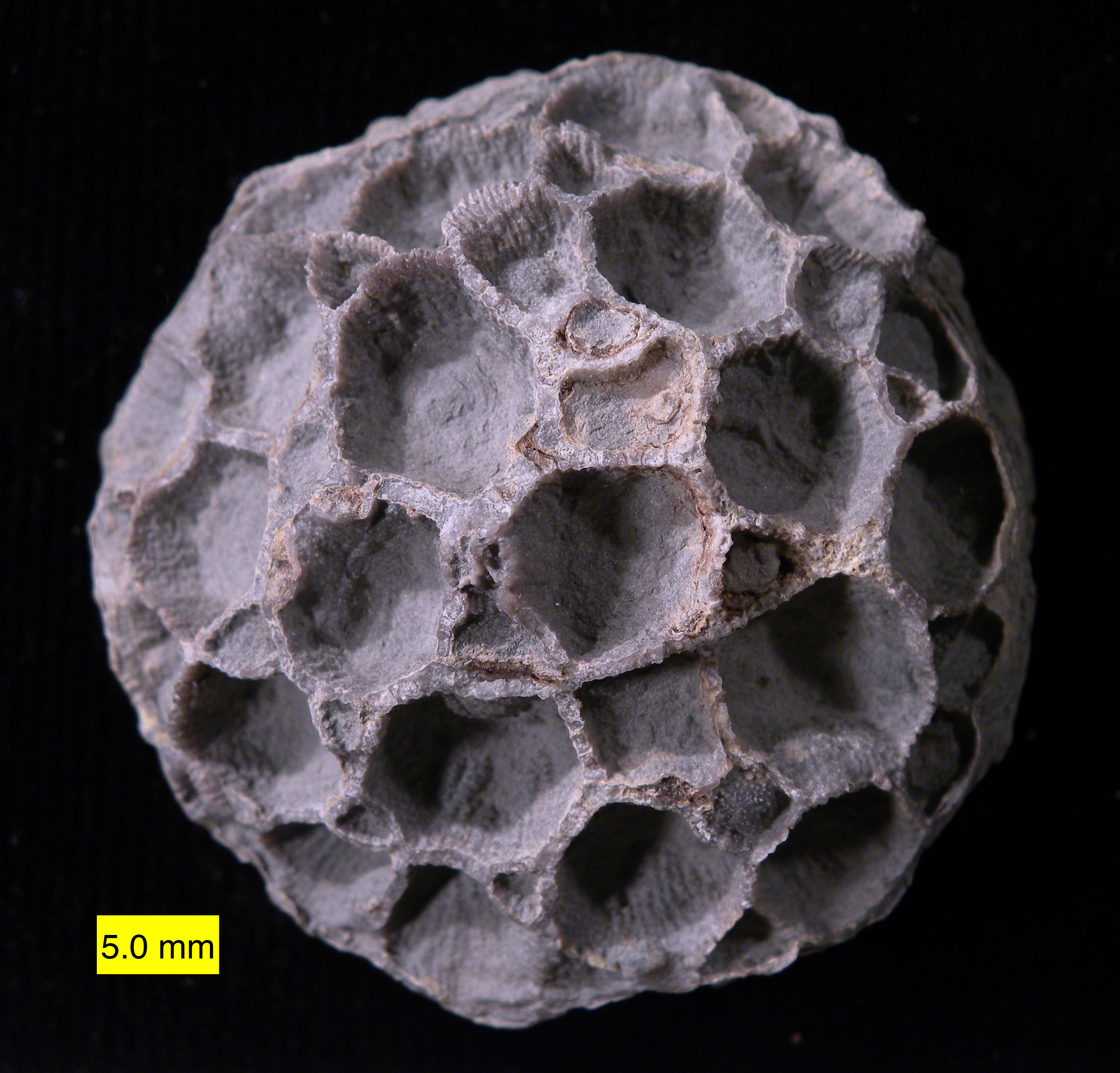
- Fossil of the Silurian-Carboniferous tabulate coral Pleurodictyum
  †Pleurodictyum
- †Pliomerops
- †Plumulites
- †Polydeltoideus
- †Polyplacognathus
- †Prasopora
  - †Prasopora contigus
  - †Prasopora falesi
  - †Prasopora insularis
  - †Prasopora nodosa
  - †Prasopora patera
  - †Prasopora simulatrix
- †Primitiella
  - †Primitiella constricta
- †Prismostylus
  - †Prismostylus fibratum
- Proboscina
  - †Proboscina auloporoides
  - †Proboscina frondosa
- †Productina
  - †Productina sampsoni – tentative report
- †Proetides – tentative report
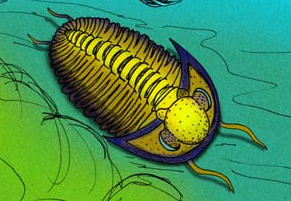
- Restoration of the Silurian trilobite Proetus
  †Proetus
  - †Proetus parviusculus
- †Prokopicrinus
  - †Prokopicrinus barricki
- †Protarea
  - †Protarea richmondensis
- †Proteoceras
  - †Proteoceras tyronensis
- †Protopanderodus
- †Protoryncha
  - †Protoryncha ridleyana
- †Protosalvinia
- †Pseudobythocyoris
- †Pseudooneotodus
  - †Pseudooneotodus bicornis
- †Pseudotythocyoris
- †Pterinea
  - †Pterinea cincinnatiensis
  - †Pterinea demissa
- †Pterotheca
  - †Pterotheca saffordi
  - †Pterotheca undulata
- †Pterygometopus
  - †Pterygometopus carleyi
  - †Pterygometopus troosti
- †Pterygometrus
  - †Pterygometrus troosti
- †Ptilotrypa
  - †Ptilotrypa obliquata
- †Ptychopleurella
  - †Ptychopleurella bassleri
- †Punctospirifer
  - †Punctospirifer subellipticus
- †Pygodus

== Q ==
- †Quadratia

== R ==
- †Rafinesquina
  - †Rafinesquina alternata
  - †Rafinesquina hermitagensis
  - †Rafinesquina ponderosa
- †Raphistoma
  - †Raphistoma striatum
- †Raphistomina
  - †Raphistomina lapicida
  - †Raphistomina modesta
- †Renalcis
- †Resserella
  - †Resserella elegantula
- †Retrorsirostra
  - †Retrorsirostra carleyi
- †Rhabdocrinus
- †Rhinidictya
  - †Rhinidictya basalis
  - †Rhinidictya lebanonensis
  - †Rhinidictya nashvillensis
  - †Rhinidictya nicholsoni
  - †Rhinidictya salemensis
  - †Rhinidictya tabulata
  - †Rhinidictya trentonensis
- †Rhipidomella
  - †Rhipidomella emarginata
- †Rhipidomelloides
  - †Rhipidomelloides oblata
- †Rhipidomena
- †Rhombopora
- †Rhombotrypa
  - †Rhombotrypa quadrata
- †Rhychotrema
  - †Rhychotrema increbescens
- †Rhynchocamera
  - †Rhynchocamera varians
- †Rhynchopora
- †Rhynchospirina
  - †Rhynchospirina formosa
- †Rhynchotrema
  - †Rhynchotrema dentatum
  - †Rhynchotrema increbescens
  - †Rhynchotrema perlamellosum
- †Rhynchotreta
  - †Rhynchotreta americana
- †Rhytiophora
- †Robergia
- Rostricellula
  - †Rostricellula orientalis
- †Rugosochonetes
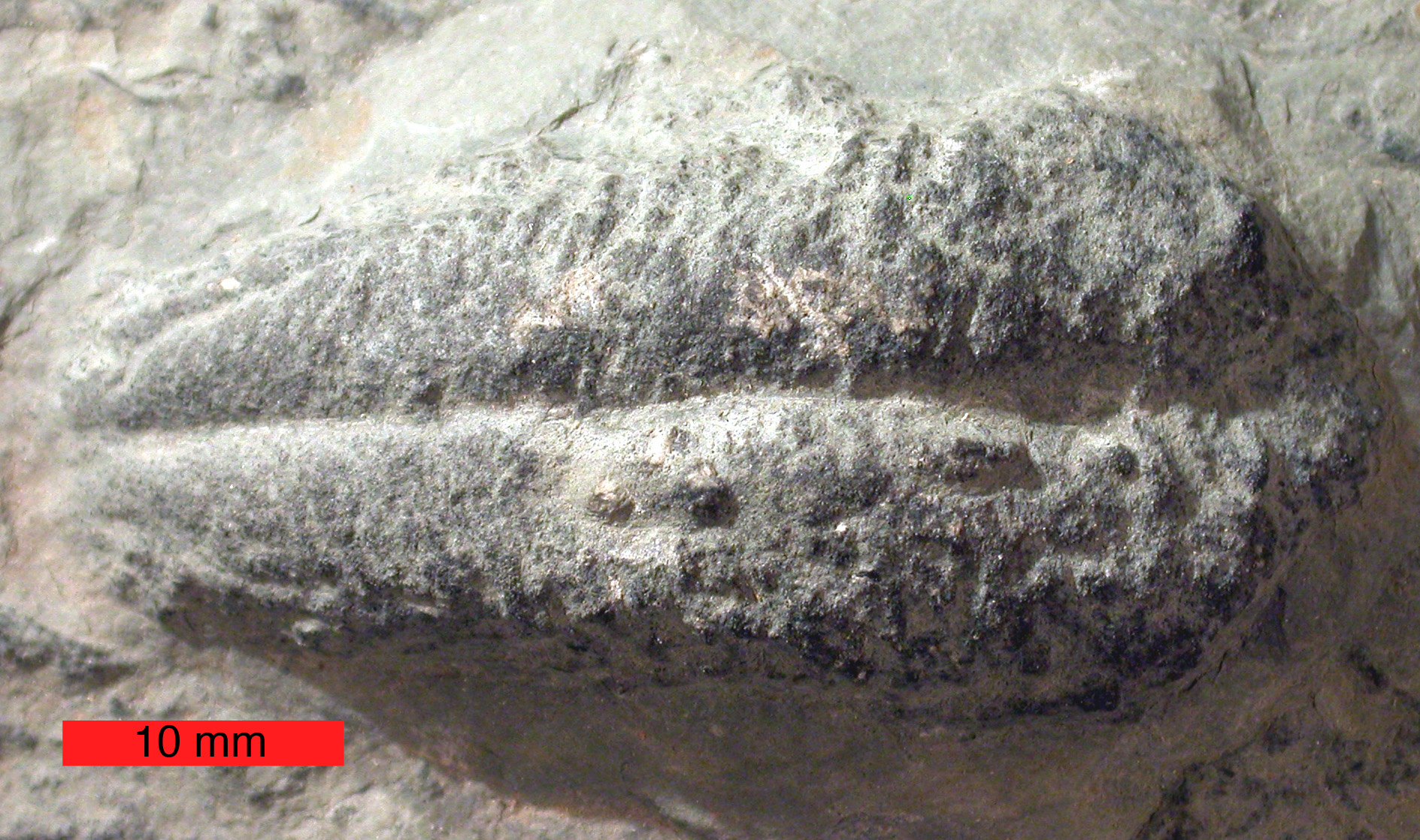
- Fossil of the arthropod burrow ichnogenus Rusophycus
  †Rusophycus

== S ==
- †Saccocrinus
  - †Saccocrinus christyi
- †Saccospongia
  - †Saccospongia danvillensis
  - †Saccospongia laxata
- †Saffordotaxis
  - †Saffordotaxis incrassatus – or unidentified comparable form
- †Sagenocrinites
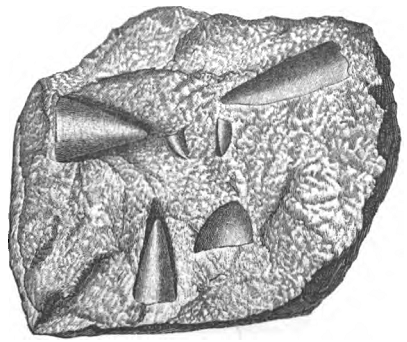
- Illustration of fossilized shells of the mysterious Cambrian organism Salterella
  †Salterella
  - †Salterella billingsi
- †Schizambon
- †Schizolopha – type locality for genus
  - †Schizolopha textilis – type locality for species
- †Schizopea
  - †Schizopea grandis
- †Schuchertella
  - †Schuchertella louisianensis
- †Schuchertocystis
  - †Schuchertocystis radiata
- †Scolithos
  - †Scolithos columbiana
- †Scyphocrinites
- †Septopora
- †Sievertsia
- †Sinuopea
  - †Sinuopea basiplanata
- †Siphonotreta
  - †Siphonotreta americana – type locality for species
- †Skenidioides
- †Skenidium
  - †Skenidium anthonense
  - †Skenidium halli
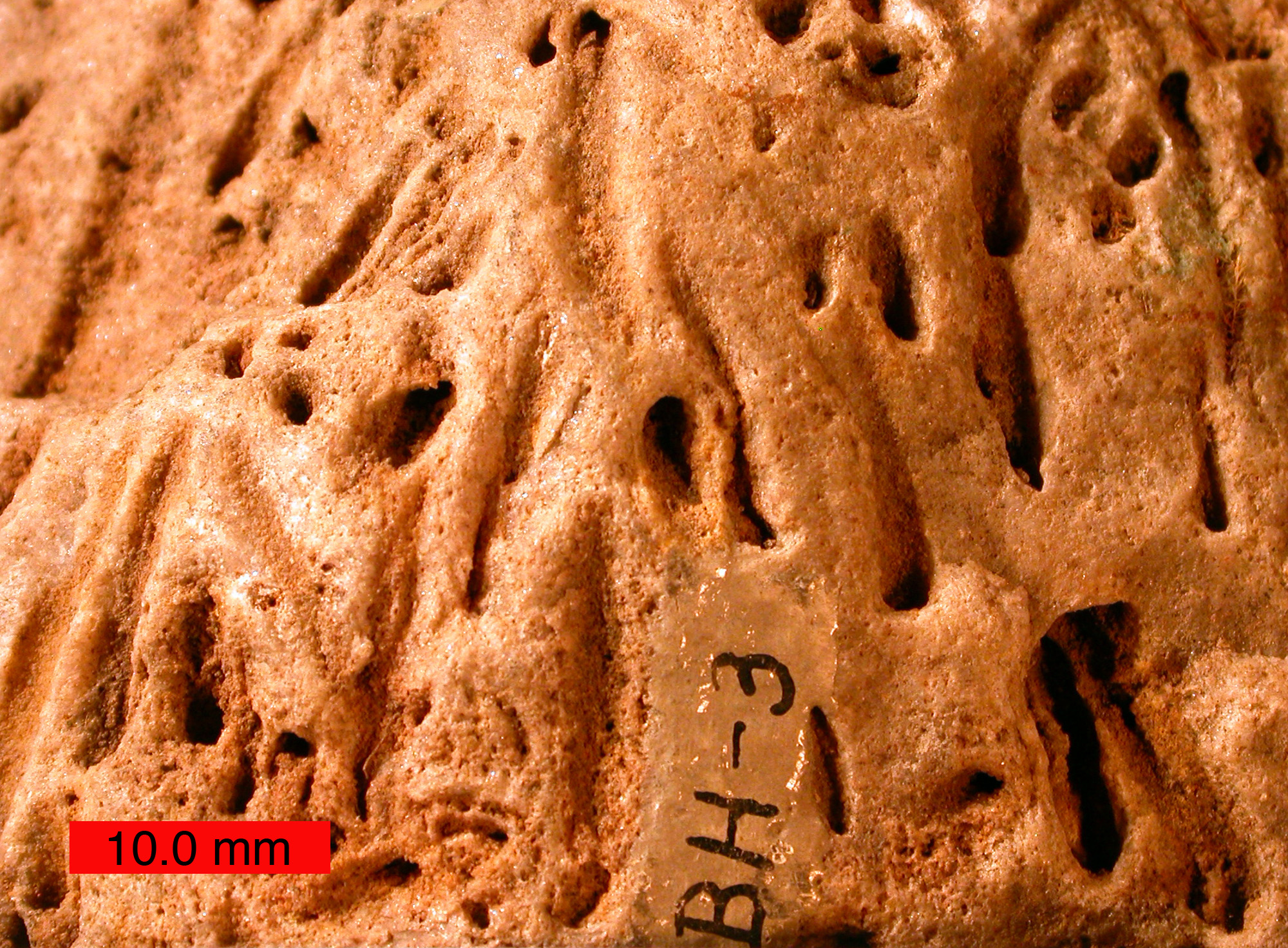
- Fossils of the Cambrian-modern worm burrow ichnogenus Skolithos
  †Skolithos
- †Solenopora
  - †Solenopora compacta
- †Sowerbyella
  - †Sowerbyella lebanonensis
  - †Sowerbyella varicostellata – type locality for species
- †Sphaerirhynchia
  - †Sphaerirhynchia stricklandi
- †Sphaerocodium – tentative report
- †Sphaerocyclus – report made of unidentified related form or using admittedly obsolete nomenclature
  - †Sphaerocyclus tuber
- †Sphenosphaera
  - †Sphenosphaera capax
  - †Sphenosphaera rogersensis
  - †Sphenosphaera troosti
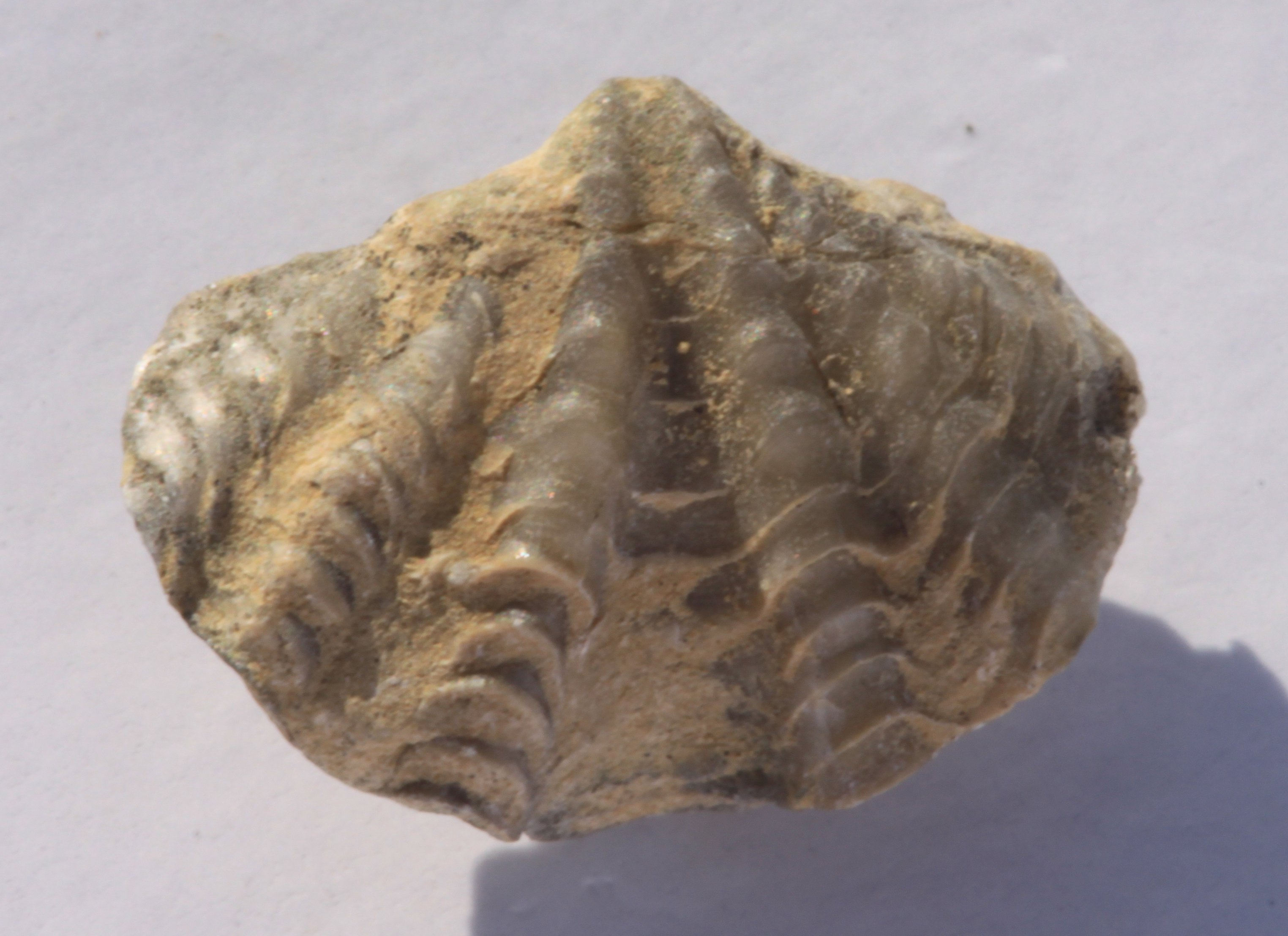
- Fossilized shell of the Late Ordovician-Late Triassic brachiopod Spirifer
  †Spirifer
  - †Spirifer shephardi – or unidentified related form
  - †Spirifer vernonensis – or unidentified related form
- Spirorbis
- †Springerocystis
  - †Springerocystis longicallis
- †Spyroceras
  - †Spyroceras bilineatum
- †Stegerhynchus
  - †Stegerhynchus indianensis
  - †Stegerhynchus whitei
  - †Stegerhynchus whitii
- †Stellipora
  - †Stellipora stipata
- †Stenoporida
- †Stereocrinus
- †Stictopora
- †Stictoporella
  - †Stictoporella angularis
  - †Stictoporella cribrilina
- †Stigmatella
  - †Stigmatella distinctaspinosa
- †Stiodermiella
  - †Stiodermiella amanita
  - †Stiodermiella tetragona
- †Stiptocrinus
- †Straparollina
  - †Straparollina cassina – type locality for species
- †Straparollus
- †Streblochondria
- †Streblopteria
- †Streblotrypa
- †Streptaster
  - †Streptaster vorticellatus
- †Streptelasma
  - †Streptelasma corniculum – or unidentified comparable form
  - †Streptelasma parisiticum – tentative report
- †Striatopora
- †Strictoporella
  - †Strictoporella cribilina
- †Striispirifer
- †Stromatocerium
  - †Stromatocerium huronensis
  - †Stromatocerium pustulosum
  - †Stromatocerium rugosum – or unidentified comparable form
- †Stromatopora
  - †Stromatopora arachnoidea
- †Stromatotrypa
  - †Stromatotrypa incrusans
  - †Stromatotrypa lamellata
  - †Stromatotrypa regularis
- †Strophalosia – tentative report
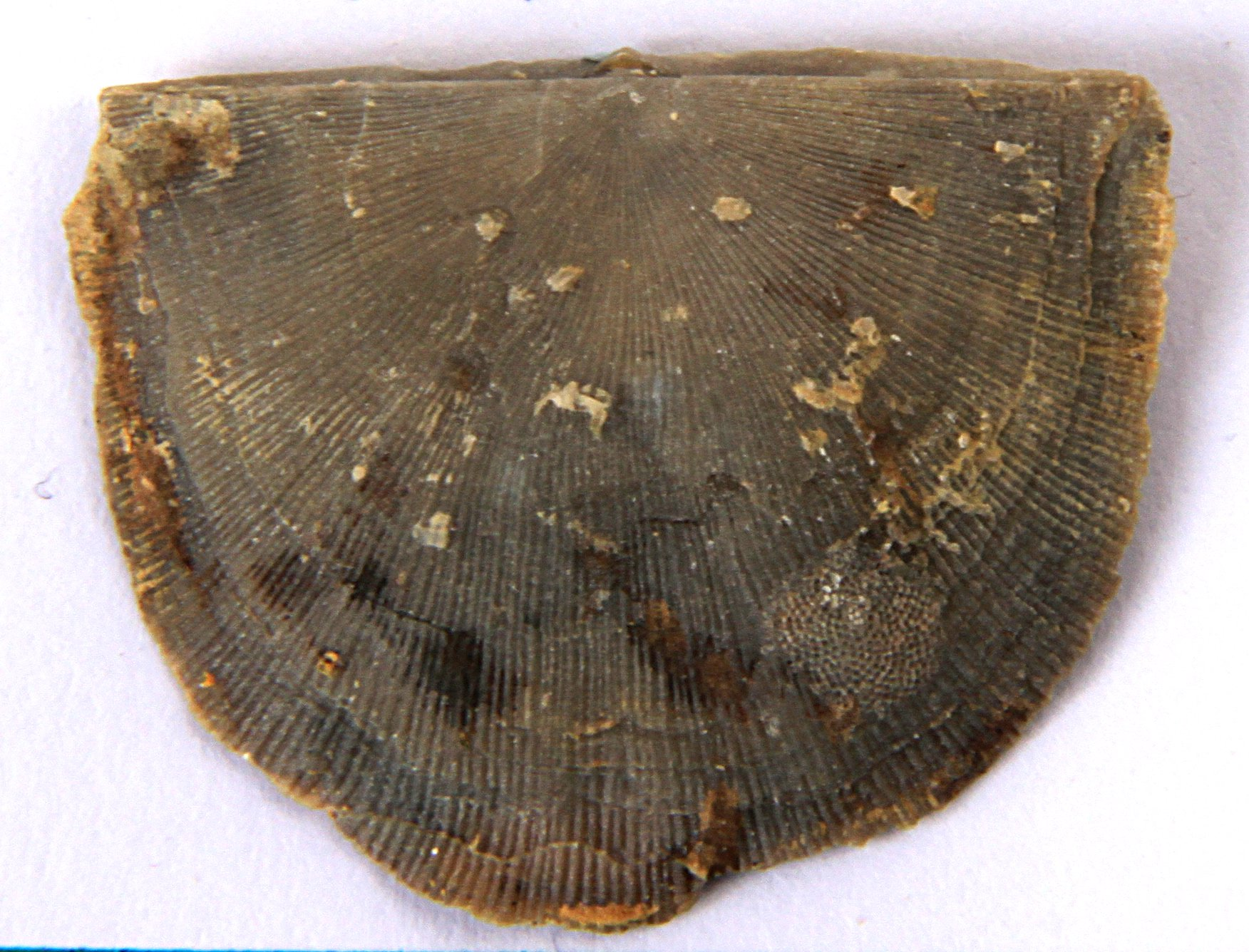
- Fossilized shell of the Ordovician-Silurian brachiopod Strophomena
  †Strophomena
  - †Strophomena concordensis
  - †Strophomena filitexta
  - †Strophomena incurvata
  - †Strophomena neglecta
  - †Strophomena odessae
  - †Strophomena planoconvexa
  - †Strophomena planodorsata
  - †Strophomena planumbona
  - †Strophomena sinuata
  - †Strophomena subtenta
  - †Strophomena vicina
- †Strophonella
  - †Strophonella lineolata
  - †Strophonella semifasciata
- †Strophopleura
- †Strophostylus
  - †Strophostylus cyclostomus
- †Subulites
  - †Subulites nanus
  - †Subulites regularis
- †Synbathocrinus
  - †Synbathocrinus swallovi

== T ==
- †Talarocrinus
  - †Talarocrinus inflatus
  - †Talarocrinus trijugis
- †Talasotreta – tentative report
  - †Talasotreta alta – type locality for species
- †Tarphophragma
  - †Tarphophragma ampla
  - †Tarphophragma multitabulata
- †Taxocrinus
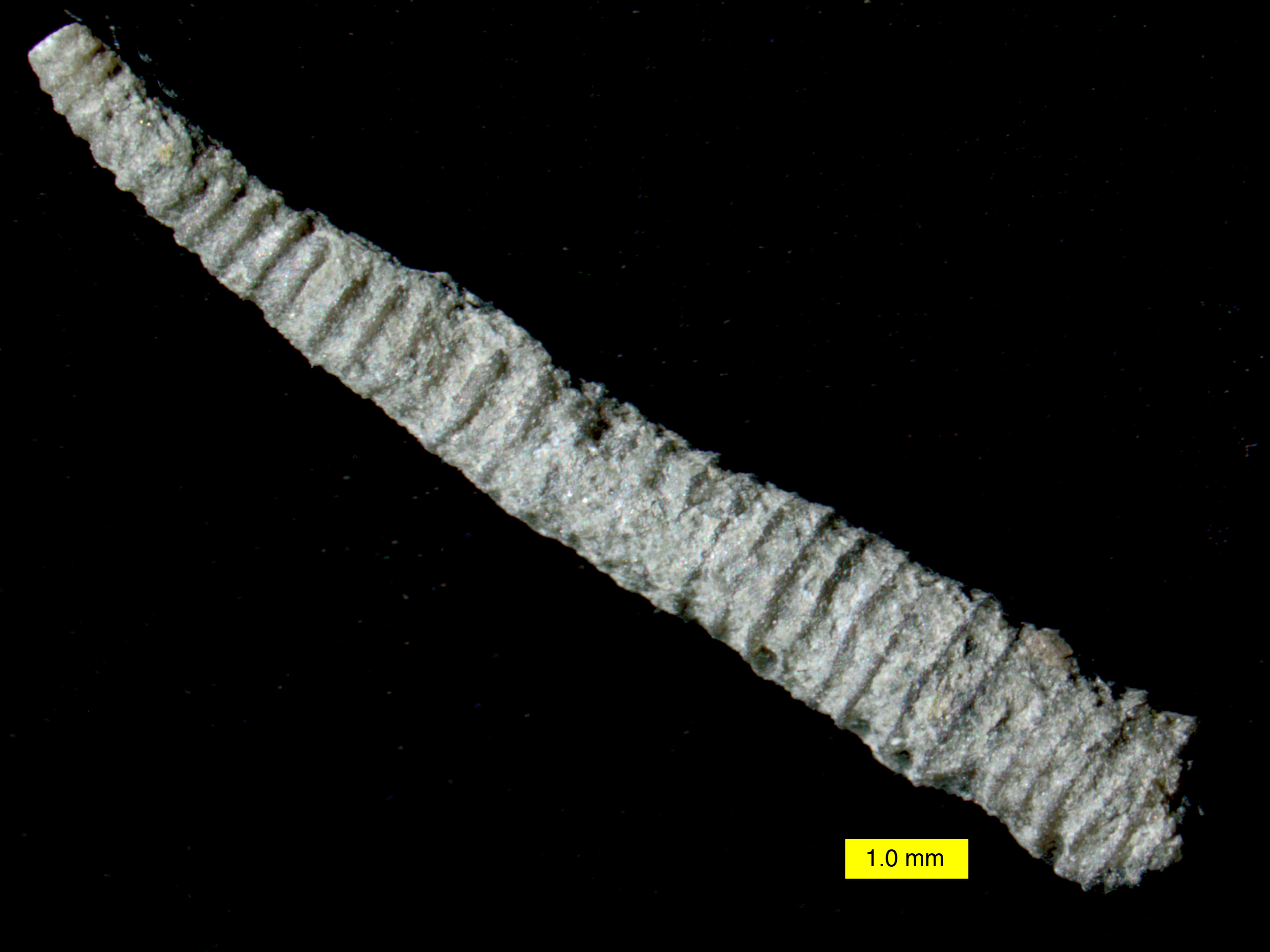
- Fossilized shell of the Early Ordovician-Late Devonian probable mollusc Tentaculites
  †Tentaculites
  - †Tentaculites obliquus
- †Tetradella
  - †Tetradella quadrilirata
- †Tetradium
  - †Tetradium carterensis
  - †Tetradium cellulosum
  - †Tetradium columnare
  - †Tetradium laxum
  - †Tetradium minus
  - †Tetradium syringoporoides
  - †Tetradium ulrichi
- †Tetranota
  - †Tetranota bidorsata
  - †Tetranota sexcarinata
- †Tetrasacculus
  - †Tetrasacculus stewartae
- †Thaerodonta
  - †Thaerodonta recedens
- †Thalamocrinus
- †Thamniscus
- †Theloreus
- †Thinocrinus
  - †Thinocrinus lowei
- Thurammina
- †Titanambonites
  - †Titanambonites amplus
- †Tolypammina
- †Trematis
- †Trematospira
- †Trepospira
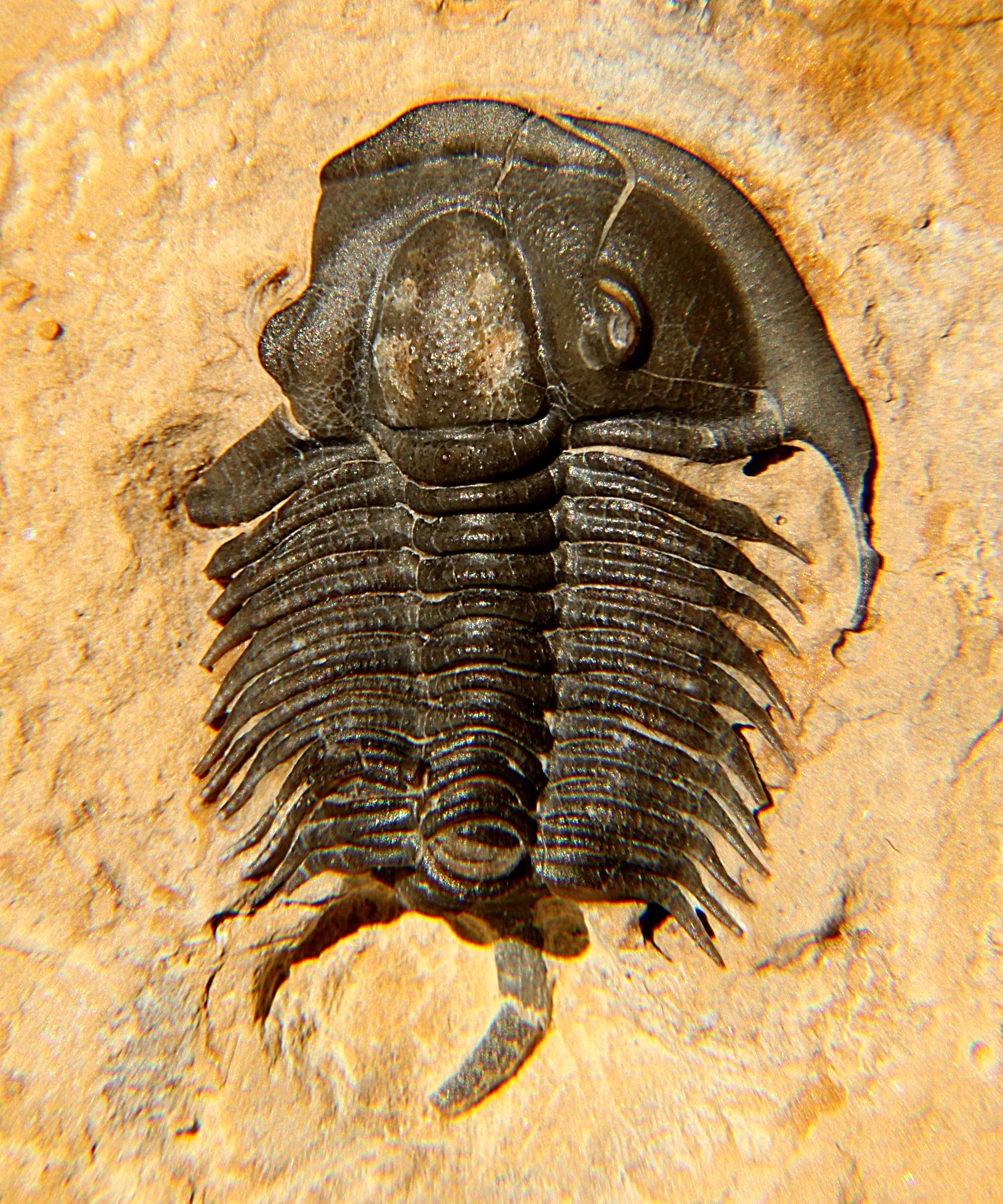
- Fossil of the Cambrian trilobite Tricrepicephalus
  †Tricrepicephalus
  - †Tricrepicephalus walcotti
- †Trigonodictya
  - †Trigonodictya irregularis
- †Trimerus
  - †Trimerus delphinocephalus
- †Triplesia
  - †Triplesia putillus
- †Trochonema
  - †Trochonema bellulum
  - †Trochonema eccentricum
  - †Trochonema trochonemoides – type locality for species
  - †Trochonema umbilicata
- †Trochonemella – tentative report
  - †Trochonemella knoxvillensis – type locality for species
  - †Trochonemella notablis – type locality for species
- †Trochophyllum
  - †Trochophyllum verneuili
- †Trophocrinus
- †Twenhofelella
  - †Twenhofelella bulbulus
- †Tyrridiocystis

== U ==
- †Ulrichocystis
  - †Ulrichocystis eximia
- †Uncinulus
  - †Uncinulus swaynensis
  - †Uncinulus vellicatus
- †Undulabucania
  - †Undulabucania punctifrons
- †Uperocrinus
  - †Uperocrinus apheles
  - †Uperocrinus nashvillae
  - †Uperocrinus robustus

== V ==
- †Valcourea
  - †Valcourea deflecta
- †Vanuxemia
  - †Vanuxemia hayniana
- †Vermiporella

== W ==
- †Walliserodus
  - †Walliserodus sancticlairi
- †Westonia
- †Whiteavesia
  - †Whiteavesia saffordi
- †Whitfieldella
  - †Whitfieldella nitida
- †Wurmiella
  - †Wurmiella excavata

== X ==
- †Xyeleblastus
  - †Xyeleblastus magnificus

== Z ==
- †Zittelella
  - †Zittelella varians
- †Zophocrinus
- †Zygospira
  - †Zygospira lebanonensis – type locality for species
  - †Zygospira modesta
  - †Zygospira saffordi
