= List of prehistoric bryozoan genera =

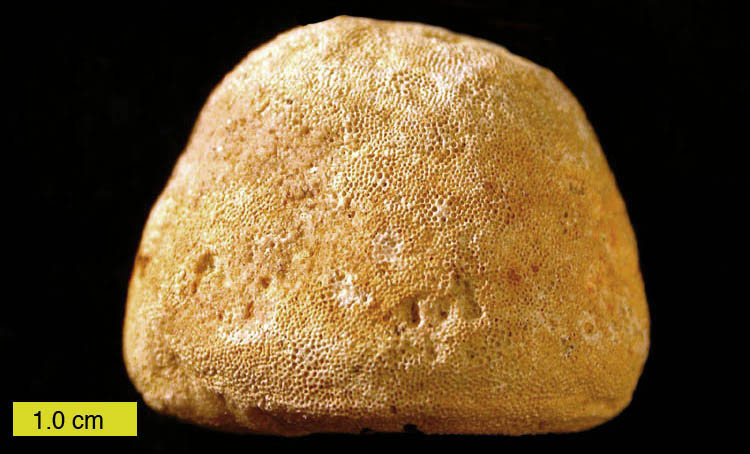
Prasopora, a trepostome bryozoan from the Ordovician of Iowa.

This list of prehistoric bryozoans is an attempt to create a comprehensive listing of all genera that have ever been included in the bryozoa which are known from the fossil record. This list excludes purely vernacular terms. It includes all commonly accepted genera, but also genera that are now considered invalid, doubtful (nomina dubia), or were not formally published (nomina nuda), as well as junior synonyms of more established names, and genera that are no longer considered bryozoans. Naming conventions and terminology follow the International Code of Zoological Nomenclature, as indicated.

Contents:	A B C D E F G H I J K L M N O P Q R S T U V W X Y Z — See also

== A ==
- Acanthocella
- Acanthoceramoporella
- Acanthocladia
- Acanthoclema
- Acanthodesia
- Acantholaminatus
- Acanthopora
- Acanthoporella
- Acanthoporidea
- Acanthotrypa
- Acanthotrypina
- Acoscinopleura
- Acrogenia
- Actinopora
- Actinotaxia
- Actinotrypa
- Actinotrypella
- Actisecos
- Adenifera
- Adeona
- Adeonella
- Adeonellopsis
- Admiratella
- Aechmella
- Aegyptopora
- Aeolopora
- Aetea
- Aetomacladia
- Aggregopora
- Aimulosia
- Aisenvergia
- Akatopora
- Alderina
- Allantopora
- Allonema
- Alternifenestella
- Altshedata
- Aluverina
- Alveolaria
- Alwynopora
- Alysidota
- Amalgamoporous
- Amalgamoprus
- Amathia
- Ammatophora
- Amphiblestrella
- Amphiblestrum
- Amphimorsoniella
- Amphiporella
- Amplexopora
- Amsassipora
- Amurodictya
- Anaphragma
- Anaptopora
- Anarthropora
- Anastomopora
- Andriopora
- Angelopora
- Anguisia
- Anisotrypa
- Anisotrypella
- Annectocyma
- Annunziopora
- Anolotichia
- Anomalotoechus
- Anornithopora
- Anotopora
- Antropora
- Aostipora
- Apatotervia
- Apertostella
- Aplousina
- Apsendesia
- Arachnidid
- Arachnidium
- Arachnoidella
- Arachnopusia
- Araxopora
- Arborocladia
- Archaeofenestella
- Archaeomeson
- Archimedes
- Arcticopora
- Arctipoora
- Argopora
- Armillopora
- Artchedella
- Arthroclema
- Arthropoma
- Arthrostyloecia
- Arthrostylus
- Arthrotrypa
- Ascodictyon
- Ascopora
- Ascoporella
- Asperopora
- Aspidopora
- Aspidostoma
- Assatkinella
- Astralochoma
- Astrovidictya
- Astroviella
- Astroviellina
- Atacama (see Plesiothoa)
- Atactopora
- Atactoporella
- Atactoporidra
- Atactotoechus
- Atagma
- Atelesopora
- Athrophragma
- Atractosoecia
- Attinopora
- Auchenopora
- Australofenestella
- Australopolypora

== B ==
- Bactrellaria
- Bactridium
- Bactropora
- Baculopora
- Bajolla
- Balantiostoma
- Balticopora
- Balticoporella
- Balticoporellina
- Banastella
- Baptopora
- Bascomella
- Bashkiriella
- Basslederella
- Bathosella
- Bathystomella
- Batopora
- Batostoma
- Batostomella
- Batostomellina
- Batrachopora
- Beania
- Beisselina
- Beisselinopsis
- Belorussipora
- Berenicea
- Biavicularium
- Bicavea
- Bicorbis
- Bicornifera
- Bicoronipora
- Bicrisia
- Bicrisina
- Bidiastopora
- Bifaxaria
- Bifissurinella
- Biflabellaria
- Biflustra
- Bimuropora
- Biovicella
- Biselenaria
- Bisidmonea
- Bitectipora
- Bitubigera
- Bivestis
- Bobiesipora
- Boreas
- Boreasina
- Botryllopora
- Bracebridgia
- Brachysoecia
- Braiesopora
- Brestopora
- Brydonella
- Bryocryptella
- Bubnoffiella
- Buffonella
- Buffonellodes
- Buria
- Buskia
- Buskopora
- Bythopora
- Bythotrypa

== C ==
- Caberea
- Caberoides
- Calacanthopora
- Calamotrypa
- Callocladia
- Callopora
- Calloporella
- Calloporina
- Callotrypa
- Calopora
- Calpensia
- Calpidopora
- Calvetina
- Calvina
- Canalipora
- Canda
- Canupora
- Canutrypa
- Capillapora
- Cardiarachnidium
- Cardioecia
- Carinifer
- Carinodictya
- Carinophylloporina
- Carydiopora
- Cassianopora
- Castanopora
- Casteropora
- Catenariopsis
- Catenicella
- Cava
- Cavaria
- Cavarinella
- Cavernella
- Ceata
- Ceidmonea
- Cellaria
- Cellarinella
- Cellarinidra
- Cellepora
- Celleporaria
- Celleporella
- Celleporina
- Cellulipora
- Centronea
- Ceramella
- Ceramophylla
- Ceramopora
- Ceramoporella
- Ceriocava
- Ceriopora
- Cerioporella
- Cervella
- Chainodictyon
- Championodictya
- Champlainopora
- Chaperia
- Characodoma
- Charixa
- Chartecytis
- Chasmatopora
- Chasmatoporina
- Chasmazoon
- Chazydictya
- Cheethamia
- Cheilohorneropsis
- Cheilonella
- Cheilopora
- Cheiloporina
- Cheilotrypa
- Chelidozoum
- Chilopora
- Chisma
- Chlidoniopsis
- Chondraulus
- Choristopetalum
- Chorizopora
- Christinella
- Cianotremella
- Cillia
- Cinctipora
- Circibiopora
- Cladodictya
- Clathropora
- Clausa
- Clausotrypa
- Clavicava
- Claviporella
- Clavisparsa
- Clavitubigera
- Cleidochasma
- Clinopora
- Cliocystiramus
- Cliotrypa
- Clithriellum
- Clonopora
- Clypeina
- Codonellina
- Coelocaulis
- Coeloclemis
- Coelocochlea
- Coelopora
- Coelospiropora
- Coleopora
- Collapora
- Collarina
- Colletosia
- Collura
- Columnotheca
- Condranema
- Conescharellina
- Conopeum
- Conotubigera
- Constellaria
- Cookobryozoon
- Copidozoum
- Corbulipora
- Cornuticella
- Coronidmonea
- Corymbopora
- Corymboporella
- Corynostylus
- Corynotrypa
- Coscinella
- Cosciniopsis
- Coscinium
- Coscinoecia
- Coscinopleura
- Coscinotrypa
- Costazia
- Costula
- Cothurnicella
- Cranosina
- Craspedopora
- Craspedoporina
- Crassalina
- Crassicellepora
- Crassimarginatella
- Crassodiscopora
- Crassohornera
- Crateropora
- Crepidacantha
- Crepipora
- Crepis
- Crescis
- Cribella
- Cribellopora
- Cribrendoecium
- Cribrilaria
- Cribrilina
- Cricodictyum
- Crisia
- Crisidia
- Crisidmonea
- Crisiella
- Crisina
- Crisinella
- Crisiona
- Crisisina
- Crisulipora
- Crownopora
- Crustopora
- Cryptoglena
- Cryptostomella
- Cryptosula
- Ctenopora
- Cubifenestella
- Cucullipora
- Cuneatopora
- Cupuladria
- Cuvilliera
- Cyclicopora
- Cyclocites
- Cyclocolposa
- Cyclopelta
- Cycloperiella
- Cyclophaenopora
- Cyclopora
- Cycloporella
- Cyclotrypa
- Cylindropora
- Cyphonella
- Cyphotrypa
- Cyrtopora
- Cystiramus
- Cystisella
- Cystitrypa
- Cystodictya
- Cystomeson
- Cystoporella
- Cystostictoporus
- Cytis

== D ==
- Dacryonella
- Dacryopora
- Dacryoporella
- Dakaria
- Decurella
- Decurtaria
- Defrancia
- Defranciopora
- Dekayella
- Dekayia
- Dendroecia
- Dentalitrya
- Dentiporella
- Desmatelesia
- Desmediaperoecia
- Desmeplatioecia
- Desmepora
- Diacanthopora
- Diamesopora
- Diancopora
- Dianulites
- Diastoporina
- Diazipora
- Dibunostoma
- Diceratopora
- Dichospiropora
- Dichotrypa
- Dicranopora
- Dictuonia
- Dictyoretmon
- Didymosella
- Dightonia
- Dimorphocella
- Dimorphocellaria
- Dimorphostylus
- Dionella
- Diplobeisselina
- Diplocava
- Diploclema
- Diplodesmepora
- Diplopetalopora
- Diplopholeous
- Diploporaria
- Diplorula
- Diplosolen
- Diplostenopora
- Diplotresis
- Diplotrypa
- Discocytis
- Discofascigera
- Discoflustrellaria
- Discoporella
- Discosella
- Discosparsa
- Discotruncatulipora
- Discotrypa
- Discotrypina
- Discotubigera
- Discovibracella
- Dishelopora
- Disporella
- Distansescharella
- Distefanella
- Disteginopora
- Ditaxia
- Ditaxipora
- Ditaxiporina
- Dittopora
- Dittosaria
- Diversipora
- Duncanoclema
- Duvergiera
- Dybowskiella
- Dybowskites
- Dyoidophragma
- Dyscritella
- Dyscritellina
- Dysnoetocella
- Dysnoetopora

== E ==
- Echinocava
- Eichwaldictya
- Elaphopora
- Elea
- Electra
- Eliasopora
- Ellisina
- Ellisinidra
- Emballotheca
- Enallopora
- Encicellaria
- Enoplostomella
- Ensiphragma
- Ensipora
- Entalophora
- Entalophoroecia
- Entomaria
- Eodyscritella
- Eofistulipora
- Eoheteropora
- Eohippotha
- Eohornera
- Eopachydictya
- Eoscrupocellaria
- Eosemicoscinium
- Eostenopora
- Eostenoporella
- Epiactinotrypa
- Eridocamplyus
- Eridopora
- Eridotrypa
- Eridotrypella
- Eridotrypellina
- Erinella
- Erkosonea
- Escharella
- Escharicellaria
- Escharifora
- Escharina
- Escharipora
- Escharoides
- Escharopora
- Esthoniopora
- Esthonioporina
- Esthoniporella
- Etherella
- Eucheilopora
- Eucratea
- Eulyra
- Euritina
- Europora
- Eurydictya
- Eurystomella
- Eurystrotos
- Eurythyrhombopora
- Euspilopora
- Evactinopora
- Evactinostella
- Exechonella
- Exfenestella
- Exidomonea
- Exochella
- Exochoecia

== F ==
- Fabifenestella
- Fasciculinopora
- Fasciculipora
- Fascigera
- Fascipora
- Favicella
- Favositella
- Fenestella
- Fenestellata
- Fenestepora
- Fenesteverta
- Fenestralia
- Fenestrapora
- Fenestrellina
- Fenestrulina
- Figularia
- Filicava
- Filicea
- Filicrisia
- Filicrisina
- Filifascigera
- Filiramoporina
- Filisparsa
- Filites
- Fischerella
- Fissuricella
- Fistulamina
- Fistulicanta
- Fistuliphragma
- Fistulipora
- Fistuliporella
- Fistuliporidra
- Fistuliramus
- Fistulocladia
- Fistulotrypa
- Flabellopora
- Flabellotrypa
- Flexifenestella
- Floridina
- Floridinella
- Flustra
- Flustrella
- Flustrellaria
- Foraripora
- Foricula
- Francopora
- Frondipora
- Frurionella
- Fungella
- Fusicellaria

== G ==
- Galeopsis
- Ganiella
- Gargantua
- Gastropella
- Gaudryanella
- Geinitzella
- Geisopora
- Gemellaria
- Gemellipora
- Gemelliporella
- Gemelliporidra
- Gemelliporina
- Geminella
- Gephyrophora
- Gephyrotes
- Gigantopora
- Gilmouropora
- Girtyopora
- Girtyoporina
- Glauconomella
- Globulipora
- Glossotrypa
- Glyptopora
- Goldfussitrypa
- Goniocladia
- Goniocladiella
- Goniotrypa
- Gortanipora
- Goryunovia
- Grammanotosoecia
- Grammascosoecia
- Grammella
- Grammothoa
- Graptodictya
- Graptopora
- Graptoporella

== H ==
- Hagenowinella
- Haimeina
- Hallopora
- Halloporina
- Haplocephalopora
- Haplooecia
- Haplopoma
- Haplopomella
- Haplotrypa
- Hapsidopora
- Harmeriella
- Haswellia
- Hayasakapora
- Helenopora
- Helicopora
- Heliotrypa
- Helixotionella
- Heloclema
- Helopora
- Hemeschara
- Hemibashkirella
- Hemicellaria
- Hemicosciniopsis
- Hemicyclopora
- Hemieridotrypa
- Heminematopora
- Hemiphlactella
- Hemiphragma
- Hemiseptella
- Hemismittina
- Hemistylus
- Hemitrypa
- Hemitrypella
- Hemiulrichostylus
- Hennigopora
- Herentia
- Hernodia
- Herpetopora
- Hesperopora
- Heteractis
- Heterocella
- Heteroconopeum
- Heterocrisina
- Heterohaplooecia
- Heteropora
- Heteroporella
- Heterotrypa
- Hexacanthopora
- Hexagonella
- Hexaporites
- Hexites
- Hiantopora
- Hinaclema
- Hincksina
- Hincksipora
- Hinganella
- Hinganotrypa
- Hippadenella
- Hippaliosina
- Hipperechonella
- Hippiopora
- Hippodiplosia
- Hippoexechonella
- Hippolyrula
- Hippomenella
- Hippomonavella
- Hippophylactella
- Hippopleurifera
- Hippopodina
- Hippopodinella
- Hippoporella
- Hippoporidra
- Hippoporina
- Hippopozoon
- Hipposera
- Hippothoa
- Hippozeugosella
- Hoeverella
- Holoporella
- Holostegopora
- Homalostega
- Homoeosolen
- Homotrypa
- Homotrypella
- Hoplitaechmella
- Hoplocheilina
- Hopora
- Hormerella
- Hornera
- Houzeauina
- Hubeipora
- Hunanopora
- Hyalotoechus
- Hyphasmopora
- Hyporosopora
- Hystricopora

== I ==
- Iberostomata
- Ichnopora
- Ichthyorachis
- Idioclema
- Idiotrypa
- Idmidronea
- Idmonea
- Idmonella
- Idmoneoides
- Ignotifenestella
- Ignotrypa
- Ikelarchimedes
- Immergentia
- Inconobotopora
- Infundibulipora
- Insignia
- Intrapora
- Inversiula
- Ipmorella
- Iraidina
- Isotrypa
- Isphairamella

== J ==
- Jaculina
- Jordanopora

== K ==
- Kalevipora
- Kallodictyon
- Kalvariella
- Kankopora
- Kasakhstanella
- Kazarchimedes
- Kelestoma
- Kenella
- Kielanopora
- Kielcepora
- Kingopora
- Kionidella
- Klaucena
- Kleidionella
- Koldophos
- Kronothoa
- Kuarnbyella
- Kukersella
- Kunradina
- Kyarnbyella
- Kylonisa
- Kysylschinopora

== L ==
- Labioporella
- Lacerna
- Lacrimula
- Lagarozoum
- Lagenipora
- Lagenosypho
- Lagonoecia
- Lagynopora
- Laminopora
- Lamottopora
- Lamtshinopora
- Lanarkopora
- Lanceopora
- Lanopora
- Latereschara
- Laterocavea
- Laterocea
- Lateroflustrellaria
- Laterotecatia
- Laterotubigera
- Laxifenestella
- Leeporina
- Leioclema
- Leiosella
- Leiosoecia
- Lekythionia
- Lekythoglena
- Lekythopora
- Lepralia
- Lepralina
- Leptocheilopora
- Leptopora
- Leptotrypa
- Leptotrypella
- Levifenestella
- Lichenalia
- Lichenopora
- Lichenotrypa
- Liguloclema
- Linotaxis
- Lioclemella
- Lioporida
- Liripora
- Lobopora
- Lobosoecia
- Locularia
- Loculipora
- Lophoclema
- Lopholepsis
- Loxophragma
- Lunaferamita
- Lunularia
- Lunulites
- Lyrocladia
- Lyropora
- Lyroporella
- Lyroporidra

== M ==
- Macropora
- Macroporina
- Magnea
- Magnederella
- Mamillopora
- Manzonella
- Marcusodictyon
- Marcusopora
- Margaretta
- Marginaria
- Marquetta
- Marssoniella
- Marssonopora
- Mastigophora (see Herentia)
- Mastigophorella
- Matherocladia
- Matheropora
- Matsutrypa
- Maychella
- Maychellina
- Meandropora
- Mecynoecia
- Mediapora
- Medisemicoscinium
- Meekopora
- Meekoporella
- Megacanthopora
- Megacanthoporina
- Melicerita
- Melicerita
- Meliceritella
- Meliceritites
- Meliceritites
- Membranipora
- Membraniporella
- Membraniporidra
- Membraniporina
- Membrendoecium
- Meniscopora
- Mesenteripora
- Mesonea
- Mesonopora
- Mesostomaria
- Mesotrypa
- Mesotrypina
- Metadictya
- Metastenodiscus
- Metelipora
- Metracolposa
- Metradolium
- Metrarabdotos
- Metrocrypta
- Metroperiella
- Microcampylus
- Microecia
- Micropora
- Microporella
- Microporina
- Minilya
- Minussina
- Mirifenestella
- Mitoclema
- Mitoclemella
- Mojczatrypa
- Mollia
- Mongoloclema
- Mongolodictya
- Monoceratopora
- Monocerina
- Monodesmopora
- Monoporella
- Monotrypa
- Monotrypella
- Monsella
- Monticellaria
- Monticulipora
- Moorephylloporina
- Morozovapora
- Morozoviella
- Morphasmopora
- Mosathoa
- Moyanopora
- Moyerella
- Mucronella
- Multicavea
- Multicrescis
- Multifascigera
- Multigalea
- Multiphragma
- Multisparsa
- Multitubigera
- Multizonopora
- Mumiella
- Murengoloclema
- Murinopsia
- Myagropora
- Myriapora
- Myriozoum
- Mystriopora

== N ==
- Nannopora
- Nekhoroshoviella
- Neliella
- Nellia
- Nemacanthclema
- Nemacanthopora
- Nemataxidra
- Nemataxis
- Nematifera
- Nematopora
- Nematoporella
- Nematotrypa
- Neoeridocampilus
- Neoeridotrypella
- Neoretenoa
- Neoreteporina
- Neorhombopora
- Neotrematopora
- Nephropora
- Neuropora
- Neuroporella
- Nevianopora
- Newportopora
- Nicholsonella
- Nicklesopora
- Niigaella
- Nikiforopora
- Nikiforovella
- Nipponstenopora
- Notamia
- Notoplagioecia
- Nudonychocella
- Nudymiella

== O ==
- Oanduella
- Oanduellina
- Obliquostoma
- Ochetosella
- Ochetosellina
- Odonotrypa
- Odontionella
- Oeciophylloporina
- Ogbinopora
- Ogiva
- Ogivalia
- Ogivalina
- Oligotopora
- Omalosecosa
- Oncousoecia
- Onychocella
- Onychocellaria
- Opisthornithopora
- Orbignyella
- Orbignyopora
- Orbipora
- Orbitulipora
- Orectodictya
- Orthopora
- Osburnostylus
- Osculipora
- Osthimosia
- Otionella
- Otopora
- Ottoseetaxis

== P ==
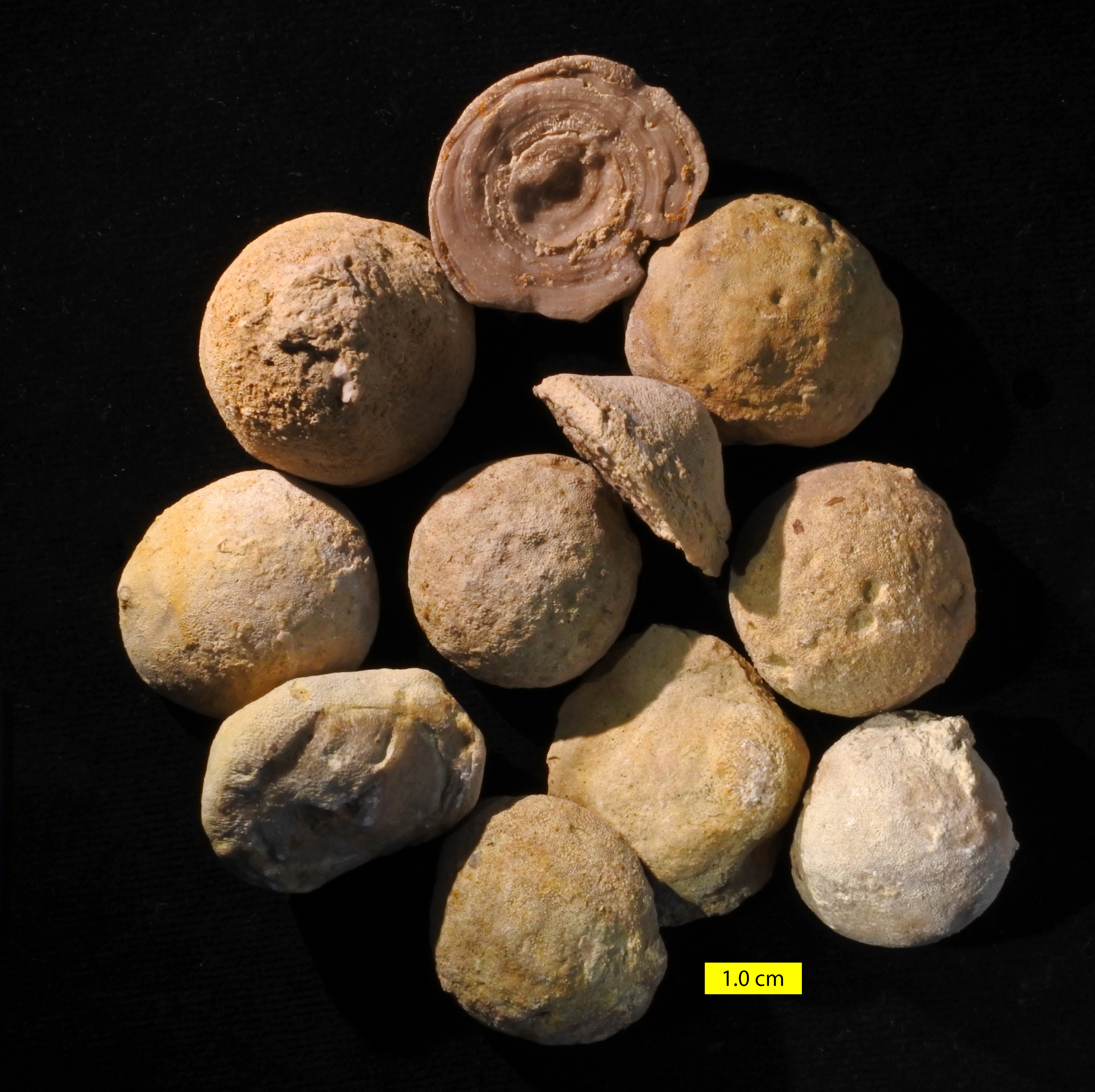
Prasopora falesi (James, 1884) from the Decorah Formation (Katian, Upper Ordovician) exposed in Decorah, Iowa.

- Pachycraspedon
- Pachydera
- Pachydictya
- Pachystomaria
- Pachyteichopora
- Pachythecella
- Pakridictya
- Palaeocoryne
- Palaeocrisidia
- Paleoatactoechus
- Paleschara
- Palmicellaria
- Pamirella
- Pancheilopora
- Papillalunaria
- Parachasmatopora
- Paracrescis
- Parafenestalia
- Parafenestella
- Paralhederella
- Paralioclema
- Parametelipora
- Paranicklespora
- Paraseptopora
- Parasmittina
- Parastenodiscus
- Paratrachytoechus
- Paratretocycloecia
- Paravinella
- Parellisina
- Parleiosoecia
- Parmularia (see Lanceopora)
- Parobeisselina
- Partretocycloecia
- Parvohallopora
- Pasythea
- Patellipora
- Patenaria
- Patsyella
- Paucipora
- Pavobeisselina
- Pavolunuites
- Pedrogopora
- Pelmatopora
- Penetrantia
- Pennipora
- Penniretepora
- Perfodiastopora
- Pergensella
- Perigastrella
- Peripora
- Periporosella
- Peristomella
- Permofenestella
- Permoheloclema
- Permoleioclema
- Permopora
- Peronopora
- Persiopora
- Pesnastylus
- Petalopora
- Petaloporella
- Petalostegas
- Petalotrypa
- Petigopora
- Petraliella
- Phacelopora
- Phaenophragma
- Phaenopora
- Phaenoporella
- Pharopora
- Phidolopora
- Phoceana
- Pholidopora
- Phonicosia
- Phormopora
- Phractopora
- Phractoporella
- Phragmophera
- Phragmopora
- Phragmotrypa
- Phrynopora
- Phylactella
- Phylactellipora
- Phyllodictya
- Phylloporina
- Pictatella
- Pileotrypa
- Pinacotrypa
- Pinegopora
- Pinnatopora
- Pinnctoporella
- Pithodella
- Plagioecia
- Plagiosmittia
- Planicellaria
- Platonea
- Platyglena
- Plethopora
- Plethoporella
- Pleurolyrula
- Pleuronea
- Pleuroschizella
- Pliophloea
- Pnictopora
- Pnictoporopsis
- Podljassopra
- Polyascosoecia
- Polyascosoeciella
- Polycephalopora
- Polyceratopora
- Polycylindricus
- Polyfenestella
- Polypora
- Polyporella
- Polyspinopora
- Polyteichus
- Porella
- Poriceata
- Poricella
- Poricellaria
- Porina
- Porismittina
- Porometra
- Poropeltarion
- Poroplagioecia
- Praesemicoscinium
- Prasopora
- Prasoporina
- Prattia
- Prenantia
- Primarella
- Primorella
- Prismopora
- Proavella
- Proboscina
- Proboscinopora
- Prodromopora
- Profistulipora
- Promediapora
- Prophyllodictya
- Prosotopora
- Prosthenoecia
- Prostomaria
- Protocrisina
- Protoretepora
- Proutella
- Pseudoascopora
- Pseudobatostomella
- Pseudobeisselma
- Pseudofrondipora
- Pseudohornera
- Pseudoisotrypa
- Pseudolunulites
- Pseudonematopora
- Pseudopachydictya
- Pseudoseptopora
- Pseudoseriopora
- Pseudostege
- Pseudostictoporella
- Pseudotervia
- Pseudothyracella
- Pseudounitrypa
- Psilosecos
- Psilosolen
- Pterocella
- Pteropora
- Ptilocella
- Ptilodictya
- Ptilofenestella
- Ptilofenestella
- Ptiloporella
- Ptiloporina
- Ptilotrypa
- Ptilotrypina
- Ptylopora
- Puellina
- Puncturiella
- Pushkinella
- Pustulopora
- Pycnobasis
- Pycnopora
- Pyricavea
- Pyripora
- Pyriporella
- Pyriporopsis
- Pyrulella
- Pywackia

== Q ==
- Qilianopora
- Quadricellaria
- Quadriscutella
- Quadrisemicoscinium
- Quasitrilaminopora

== R ==
- Radicipora
- Radiocavaria
- Radiofascigera
- Radiopora
- Radiotrypa
- Radulopora
- Ralfina
- Ralfinella
- Ramia
- Ramipora
- Ramiporalia
- Ramiporella
- Ramiporidra
- Ramofilisparsa
- Ramphonotus
- Rarifenestella
- Realeksella
- Rectifenestella
- Rectonychocella
- Reginella
- Reptadeonella
- Reptaria
- Reptescharipora
- Reptoceritites
- Reptoclausa
- Reptofascigera
- Reptolunites
- Reptomultelea
- Reptomulticava
- Reptomulticlausa
- Reptomultisparsa
- Reptonodicava
- Retecava
- Retelea
- Retenoa
- Retepora
- Reteporellina
- Reteporidra
- Reteporina
- Reticrisina
- Reticulipora
- Reussia
- Revalopora
- Revalotrypa
- Revssirella
- Rhabdomeson
- Rhabdopora
- Rhabdotometra
- Rhacheopora
- Rhagasostoma
- Rhammatopora
- Rhamphostomella
- Rhebasia
- Rhenanerella
- Rhiniopora
- Rhinopora
- Rhinoporella
- Rhipidiopora
- Rhombocladia
- Rhombopora
- Rhomboporella
- Rhombotrypa
- Rhombotrypella
- Rimulostoma
- Ripisoecia
- Romancheina
- Ropalonaria
- Rosacilla
- Rosseliana
- Rotoporina
- Rozonovia
- Ruzhencevia
- Ryhopora

== S ==
- Saevitella
- Saffordotaxis
- Sagenella
- Salairia
- Salicornaria
- Samaria
- Sandalopora
- Sardesonina
- Savignyella
- Scalaripora
- Scenellopora
- Sceptropora
- Schischatella
- Schiscjkatella
- Schismopora
- Schismoporella
- Schistacanthopora
- Schizaropsis
- Schizemiella
- Schizemiellopsis
- Schizobathysella
- Schizobrachiella
- Schizomavella
- Schizoporella
- Schizoporellopsis
- Schizoretepora
- Schizorthosecos
- Schizosmittina
- Schizostomella
- Schizotheca
- Schizotrema
- Schizotremopora
- Schulgina
- Scorpiodina
- Scruparia
- Scrupocellaria
- Scuticella
- Seelandia
- Seguenziella
- Selenaria
- Selenopora
- Semicea
- Semicinctipora
- Semiclausa
- Semicoscinium
- Semicytella
- Semicytis
- Semielea
- Semieschara
- Semiescharinella
- Semifascipora
- Semifenestella
- Semifungella
- Semihaswellia
- Semilaterotubigera
- Semimulticavea
- Seminodicrescis
- Semiopora
- Semitubigera
- Septatopora
- Septopora
- Serietubigera
- Seriopora
- Serpentipora
- Sertella
- Setosella
- Setosellina
- Setosinella
- Shishoviclema
- Shylgapora
- Sibiredictya
- Silenella
- Silenopora
- Silvaseptopora
- Sinoatactoechus
- Sinupetraliella
- Siphodictyum
- Siphoniotyphlus
- Siphonoporella
- Skylonia
- Smittina
- Smittinella
- Smittipora
- Smittistoma
- Smittoidea
- Solenonychocella
- Solenophragma
- Sonninopora
- Sparsicavea
- Sparsicytis
- Sparsiporina
- Spathipora
- Spatiopora
- Speotrypa
- Sphaerogypina
- Sphaeropora
- Sphaerulobryozoon
- Sphenella
- Sphragiopora
- Spinicharixa
- Spinofenestella
- Spinopora
- Spira
- Spirentolophora
- Spirillopora
- Spiropora
- Spiroporina
- Spridmonea
- Staffordotaxis
- Stamenocella
- Stathmepora
- Staurosteginopora
- Steginopora
- Steginoporella
- Stellahevaformis
- Stellatodictya
- Stellipora
- Stellocavea
- Stenocladia
- Stenodiscus
- Stenophragmidium
- Stenopora
- Stenoporella
- Stenopsella
- Stenopsis
- Stenosipora
- Stephanodesma
- Stephanollona
- Stephanosella
- Stephanotrema
- Steraechmella
- Stereotoechus
- Stichocados
- Stichomicropora
- Stichopora
- Stichoporina
- Stichtostega
- Stictocella
- Stictopora
- Stictoporella
- Stictoporellina
- Stictoporina
- Stictotrypa
- Stigmatella
- Stigmatoechos
- Stolonicella
- Stomachetosella
- Stomatopora
- Stomatoporina
- Stomatoporopsis
- Stomhypselosaria
- Streblascopora
- Streblocladia
- Streblopax
- Streblotrypa
- Streblotrypella
- Stromatotrypa
- Strongylopora
- Strophipora
- Strotopora
- Stylopoma
- Subretepora
- Sulcocava
- Sulcoretepora
- Supercytis
- Sylonika
- Synaptacella
- Synnotum
- Synocladia
- Synocladiopsis
- Syringoclemis
- Systenostoma

== T ==
- Tabulipora
- Tabuliporella
- Taeniocellana
- Taeniodictya
- Taeniopora
- Taenioporella
- Taenioporina
- Talmontipora
- Tamaroclema
- Taphrostoma
- Taractopora
- Tarphophragma
- Tavayzopora
- Tebitopora
- Tegella
- Teichopora
- Telopora
- Terebellaria
- Terebripora
- Tervia
- Tessaradoma
- Tetragonoecia
- Tetraplaria
- Tetrapora
- Tetratoechus
- Teuchopora
- Thalamoporella
- Thamniscus
- Thamnotrypa
- Thecatia
- Theonoa
- Tholopora
- Thoracopora
- Thornipora
- Thyracella
- Timanodictya
- Timanotrypa
- Trachytoechus
- Trataucladia
- Trematella
- Trematooecia
- Trematopora
- Trematoporina
- Tremocoscinopleura
- Tremogasterina
- Tremolyrula
- Tremopora
- Tremoschizodina
- Tremotoichos
- Trepocryptopora
- Trepostomina
- Treptopora
- Tretocycloecia
- Tretonea
- Tretosina
- Tricephalopora
- Tricolpopora
- Tricornicella
- Trigonodictya
- Trigonopora
- Trilophopora
- Triplopora
- Triplozooecia
- Triporula
- Triznella
- Trochiliopora
- Trochopora
- Trochosodon
- Tropidopora
- Truncatula
- Truncatulipora
- Trypematella
- Trypocella
- Trypostega
- Tshokrakopora
- Tubescharina
- Tubigera
- Tubigerina
- Tubiporella
- Tubitrabecularia
- Tubucella
- Tubucellaria
- Tubulipora
- Tubulitrypa
- Turbicellopora
- Tylopora

== U ==
- Ubaghsia
- Uldzapora
- Ulrichostylus
- Ulrichotrypa
- Ulrichotrypella
- Umbonula
- Umbrellina
- Uniavicularia
- Unicrisia
- Unicytis
- Unitrypa
- Unitubigera
- Uralotrypa
- Utgaardostylus
- Utropora

== V ==
- Vasalemmapora
- Velumella
- Verella
- Verminaria
- Veroclema
- Vesicularia
- Vibracella
- Vibracellina
- Vibraculina
- Vincularia
- Vinella
- Virgatella
- Virgocella
- Vittaticella
- Voigtella
- Voigtia
- Voigtiella
- Voigtopora
- Volgia
- Volnovachia
- Volviflustrellaria
- Voorthuyseniella

== W ==
- Wassypora
- Watersipora
- Wawalia
- Wilbertopora
- Wjatkella
- Wolinella
- Woodipora
- Worthenopora
- Wyseotrypa

== X ==
- Xaveropora
- Xenotrypa

== Y ==
- Yangotrypa
- Ybseloscoecia
- Yichangopora
- Yunnanopora

== Z ==
- Zagorsekia
- Zigzagopora
- Zlambachia
- Zonopora
- Zozariella
