= Ceramopora =

Ceramopora Temporal range: Tremadocian–Givetian

Scientific classification
- Kingdom: Animalia
- Phylum: Bryozoa
- Class: Stenolaemata
- Order: †Cystoporida
- Family: †Ceramoporidae
- Genus: †Ceramopora

Extinct genus of moss animals

Ceramopora is an extinct genus of bryozoan of the family Ceramoporidae. It is one of the earliest genera of bryozoans. Its colonies were thin and discoid, with large autozooecia, abundant communication pores, lunaria, and monticules with depressions in their centers. It had no acanthostyles or diaphragms, distinguishing it from Acanthoceramoporella.
