= Cystodictya =

Cystodictya Temporal range: 388.1–272.5 Ma

Scientific classification
- Kingdom: Animalia
- Phylum: Bryozoa
- Class: Stenolaemata
- Order: †Cystoporida
- Family: †Cystodictyonidae
- Genus: †Cystodictya; Ulrich, 1882

Species
- †Cystodictya angusta; †Cystodictya carbonaria (Meek, 1871); †Cystodictya crispata (Quenstedt, 1881); †Cystodictya divisa Rogers, 1900; †Cystodictya elegans Harlton, 1933; †Cystodictya flexuosa Mather, 1915; †Cystodictya gallensis; †Cystodictya morrowensis Mather, 1915; †Cystodictya sinuomarginata Mather, 1915

Extinct genus of moss animals

Cystodictya is a genus of prehistoric bryozoans in the extinct family Cystodictyonidae.

The species C. elegans is from the Pennsylvanian (Upper Carboniferous) of the Johns Valley Formation of Oklahoma.

== See also ==
- List of prehistoric bryozoan genera
