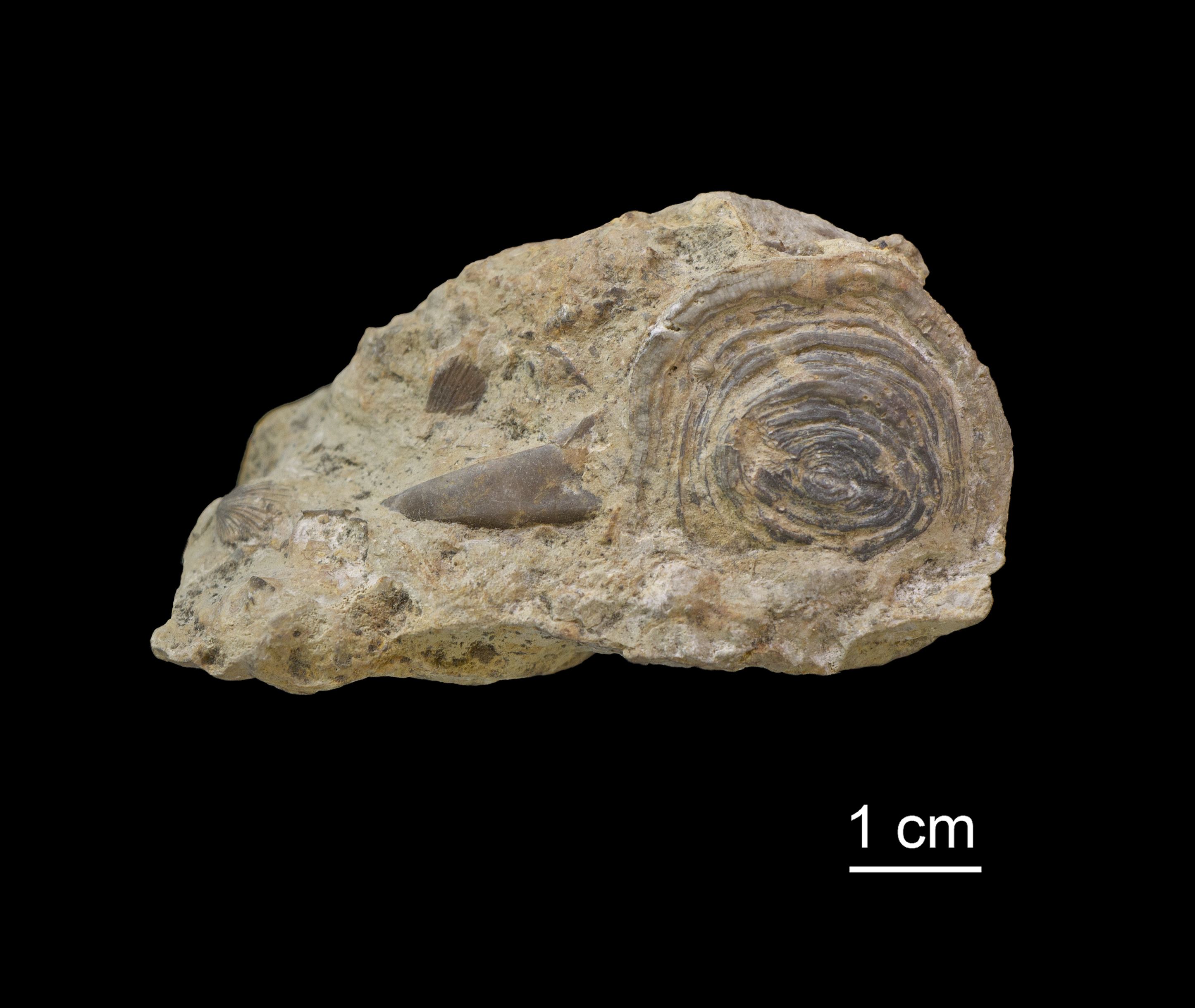
- Favositella exserta

Scientific classification
- Kingdom: Animalia
- Phylum: Bryozoa
- Class: Stenolaemata
- Order: †Cystoporida
- Family: †Ceramoporidae
- Genus: †Favositella; Etheridge & Foord, 1884

Type species
- Favosites interpunctus Quenstedt, 1878

Species
- See text.

Synonyms
- † Dnestropora Astrova, 1965

= Favositella =

Favositella Temporal range: Darriwilian–Eifelian

Extinct genus of moss animals

Favositella is an extinct genus of bryozoans from the Ordovician, Silurian and Devonian periods.

== Species ==
The following species are recognised:

- † Favositella anolotichoides Oakley, 1966
- † Favositella discoidaliformis Modzalevskaya, 1972
- † Favositella discoidalis Bassler, 1911
- † Favositella exserta Bassler, 1911
- † Favositella gotlandica Oakley, 1966
- † Favositella incondita Ulrich & Bassler, 1913
- † Favositella integrimuralis Kiepura, 1973
- † Favositella interpuncta (Quenstedt, 1878)
- † Favositella jucunda Kopajevich, 1984
- † Favositella mammilata Fritz, 1957
- † Favositella minganensis Twenhofel, 1938
- † Favositella mirabilis (Astrova, 1965)
- † Favositella ordinata Kopajevich, 1984
- † Favositella squamata (Lonsdale, 1839)
- † Favositella texturata Snell, 2004
- † Favositella varians (Nekhoroshev, 1948)
