= Moyerella =

Moyerella Temporal range: 455.8–436.0 Ma

Scientific classification
- Kingdom: Animalia
- Phylum: Bryozoa
- Class: Stenolaemata
- Order: †Cryptostomida
- Family: †Nematotrypidae
- Genus: †Moyerella; Nekhoroshev, 1956

Type species
- †Moyerella stellata Nekhoroshev, 1956

Species
- See text

Extinct genus of bryozoans

Moyerella is an extinct genus of bryozoan of the family Arthrostylidae, known from the Upper Ordovician and Lower Silurian periods. Its colonies are branching or segmented, generally articulated (jointed). Its autozooecia are short tubes that appear triangular in cross section within the endozone, bending abruptly when reaching the exozone. The autozooecial apertures are round and aligned into diagonal rows, and paired heterozooecia occur between the autozooecial apertures.

== Species ==
- †Moyerella consona Gorjunova, 1985
- †Moyerella delicata Kopaevich, 1975
- †Moyerella francisca (Bassler, 1911)
- †Moyerella isfaraensis Nekhorosheva, 1988
- †Moyerella magna Kopaevich, 1975
- †Moyerella obscura (Astrova, 1965)
- †Moyerella parva Ernst, Brett & Wilson, 2019
- †Moyerella robusta Kopaevich, 1975
- †Moyerella stellata Nekhoroshev, 1956
- †Moyerella tjanshanica Nekhorosheva, 1988
