= Callocladia =

Callocladia Temporal range: 423.0–323.2 Ma

Scientific classification
- Kingdom: Animalia
- Phylum: Bryozoa
- Class: Stenolaemata
- Order: †Trepostomatida
- Family: †Crustoporidae
- Genus: †Callocladia; Girty, 1911

Type species
- Callocladia elegans Girty, 1911

Species
- See text

Extinct genus of moss animals

Callocladia is an extinct genus of prehistoric bryozoans in the extinct family Crustoporidae.

Species:

- Callocladia acanthoporoides Pushkin, 1976 †
- Callocladia bifoliosa Li, 1977 †
- Callocladia cava Pushkin, 1976 †
- Callocladia elegans Girty, 1911 †
- Callocladia emaciata (Kopaevich, 1975) †
- Callocladia gracila Li, 1977 †
- Callocladia hemiphragmos Liu, 1980 †
- Callocladia jensensis Karklins, 1986 †
- Callocladia kaugatumensis Astrova, 1970 †
- Callocladia ningxiagensis Li, 1977 †
- Callocladia orientalis Lu, 1983 †
- Callocladia ramosa Crockford, 1957 †
- Callocladia rara Pushkin, 1990 †
- Callocladia tomashevensis Pushkin, 1976 †

== See also ==
- List of prehistoric bryozoan genera
