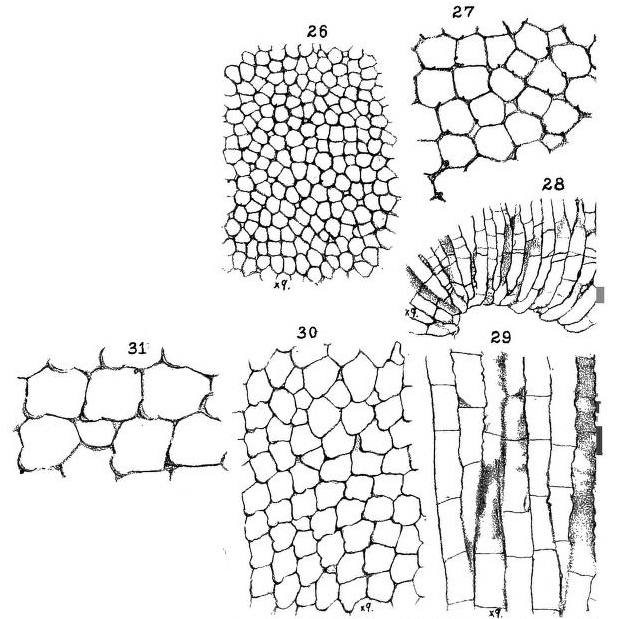
- sections of Crepipora subæquata and Crepipora perampla

Scientific classification
- Kingdom: Animalia
- Phylum: Bryozoa
- Class: Stenolaemata
- Order: †Cystoporida
- Family: †Ceramoporidae
- Genus: †Crepipora; Ulrich, 1882

Type species
- †Crepipora simulans Ulrich 1882

Species
- †Crepipora epidermata Ulrich; †Crepipora globulifera Cullison, 1938; †Crepipora hemispherica Ulrich; †Crepipora impolita Ulrich; †Crepipora impressa Ulrich; †Crepipora incrassata Bassler 1911; †Crepipora lunatifera (Bassler, 1911); †Crepipora perampla Ulrich; †Crepipora schmidti Bassler 1911; †Crepipora simulans Ulrich 1882; †Crepipora solida Ulrich; †Crepipora spatiosa Ulrich; †Crepipora subaequata Ulrich; †Crepipora venusta (Ulrich)

= Crepipora =

Crepipora Temporal range: Middle Ordovician–Upper Ordovician

Extinct genus of moss animals

Crepipora is an extinct genus of marine bryozoans belonging to the Ceramoporidae family. There are currently 18 collections from Belarus, Sweden, Canada, France and the United States (Missouri, Alabama, Ohio and Tennessee). The fossil range is from the Middle Ordovician to the Upper Ordovician.
