= Lunaferamita =

Lunaferamita Temporal range: 460.9– 449.5 Ma

Scientific classification
- Kingdom: Animalia
- Phylum: Bryozoa
- Class: Stenolaemata
- Order: †Cystoporida
- Family: †Constellariidae
- Genus: †Lunaferamita; Utgaard 1981

Extinct genus of cystoporate

Lunaferamita is an extinct genus of cystoporate bryozoans of the family Constellariidae, known from the Middle Ordovician. It is distinct from other Constellariidae due to the presence of a lunarium, a quality distinctive to cystoporates. Like other Constellariidae, such as Constellaria, it has star-shaped monticules (bumps) on the surface of its colonies.

== Species ==
The following species are recognized:

- †Lunaferamita bassleri Loeblich 1942
- †Lunaferamita nevadensis Utgaard 1981
- †Lunaferamita virginiensis Utgaard 1981
