= Cyphotrypa =

Cyphotrypa Temporal range: Middle Ordovician-Frasnian

Scientific classification
- Kingdom: Animalia
- Phylum: Bryozoa
- Class: Stenolaemata
- Order: †Trepostomatida
- Family: †Atactotoechidae
- Genus: †Cyphotrypa; Ulrich and Bassler, 1904

Extinct genus of bryozoan

Cyphotrypa is an extinct genus of Ordovician bryozoan. Its colonies form hemispherical shapes, with flat undersides and rounded tops. In cross-section, the zooecia (tubes housing individual zooids) fan out from the initial growth area and intersect the rounded top surface of the colony at right angles. A few scattered maculae are present, composed of a few zooecia larger than the others with mesopore-like apertures.

== Species ==
The following species are recognized:

- †Cyphotrypa acervulosa Ulrich 1893
- †Cyphotrypa angularis Talent 1963
- †Cyphotrypa bulbosa Billings 1865
- †Cyphotrypa definita Morozova 1960
- †Cyphotrypa magna Boulange 1963
- †Cyphotrypa regularis Jiménez-Sánchez et al. 2015
