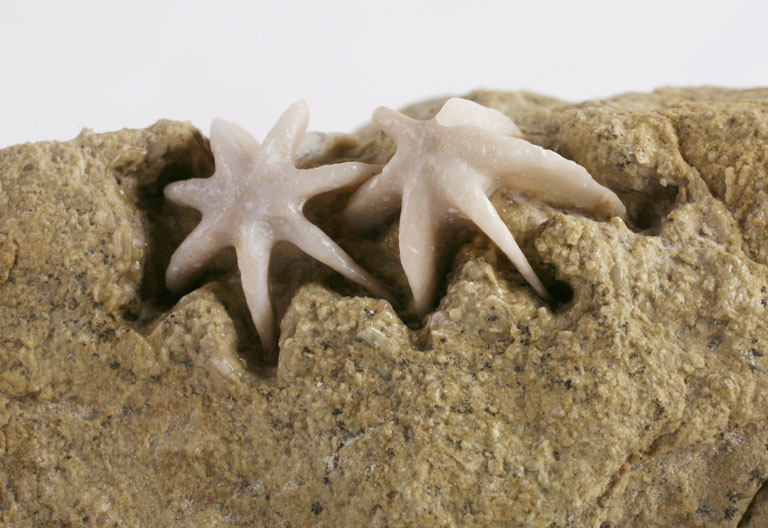

Scientific classification
- Kingdom: Animalia
- Phylum: Bryozoa
- Class: Stenolaemata
- Order: †Cystoporida
- Family: †Evactinoporidae
- Genus: †Evactinopora

= Evactinopora =

Genus of bryozoan

Evactinopora is an extinct genus of Mississippian cystoporate bryozoans of the family Evactinoporidae. It formed free-living colonies that grew into a star-shaped form. It had several distinctive phases of colony growth: larvae would grow attached to hard surfaces before detaching, and the colony would then adapt to living on soft sediment, growing radial rays for stabilization during the juvenile growth stage and vertical vanes containing autozooecia in the adult stage.
