= Cystomeson =

Scientific classification
- Kingdom: Animalia
- Phylum: Bryozoa
- Class: Stenolaemata
- Order: †Cystoporida
- Family: †Fistuliporidae
- Genus: †Cystomeson; Ernst, Krainer & Lucas, 2018
- Species: †C. sierraensis

Binomial name
- †Cystomeson sierraensis Ernst, Krainer & Lucas, 2018

Extinct genus of bryozoan

Cystomeson is an extinct genus of cystoporate bryozoan of the family Fistuliporidae, discovered in the U.S. state of New Mexico. It contains only one species, Cystomeson sierraensis. It lived during the Mississippian period. Its colonies had a branching shape and possessed a vesicular skeleton, a layer of calcitic mineral material on the surface of the colony that contained acanthopores. Instead of being hollow as in the similar genus Cheilotrypa, its colonies were solid, and its autozooecia derived from distinctive axial zooecia.
