= Iberostomata =

Iberostomata Temporal range: Katian

Scientific classification
- Kingdom: Animalia
- Phylum: Bryozoa
- Class: Stenolaemata
- Order: †Cryptostomida
- Family: †Rhinidictyidae
- Genus: †Iberostomata; Jiménez-Sánchez, Anstey & Azanka, 2010
- Species: †I. fombuenensis

Binomial name
- †Iberostomata fombuenensis Jiménez-Sánchez, Anstey & Azanka, 2010

Extinct genus of moss animals

Iberostomata fombuenensis is an extinct species of bryozoans which existed in what is now Spain during the Katian period. It was named by Andrea Jiménez-Sánchez, Robert L. Anstey and Beatriz Azanka in 2010, and is the only species in the genus Iberostomata.
