= Dybowskites =

Dybowskites Temporal range: Ordovician-Silurian 457.5–433.4 Ma

Scientific classification
- Kingdom: Animalia
- Phylum: Bryozoa
- Class: Stenolaemata
- Order: †Trepostomatida
- Family: †Ralfimartitidae
- Genus: †Dybowskites; Pushkin 1987

Extinct genus of bryozoan

Dybowskites is an extinct genus of bryozoan of the family Ralfimartitidae, found in the Ordovician and Silurian periods. It forms branching, frond-like, or sometimes segmented colonies. In cross-sections of the colonies, the tubular autozooecia are seen growing alongside the branch axis and then bending abruptly to reach the colony surface at a perpendicular angle. There are many mesozooecia and large acanthostyles that protrude from the colony surface.

== Species ==
Two species are recognized:

- †Dybowskites clava Bassler 1911
- †Dybowskites ernsti Jiménez-Sánchez 2009
