= Cyrtopora =

Cyrtopora Temporal range: Valanginian - Maastrichtian

Scientific classification
- Kingdom: Animalia
- Phylum: Bryozoa
- Class: Stenolaemata
- Order: Cyclostomatida
- Genus: †Cyrtopora von Hagenow, 1851

Type species
- Cyrtopora elegans von Hagenow, 1851

Extinct genus of moss animals

Cyrtopora is an extinct genus from a class of marine Bryozoans, the cyclostomes. It lived from 140 - 66 million years ago during the Cretaceous Period of Europe.
