= Crassaluna =

Scientific classification
- Kingdom: Animalia
- Phylum: Bryozoa
- Class: Stenolaemata
- Order: †Cystoporida
- Family: †Anolotichiidae
- Genus: †Crassaluna; Utgaard, 1968

Species
- See text

Extinct genus of bryozoan

Crassaluna is an extinct genus of cystoporate bryozoan of the family Anolotichiidae, known from the Ordovician period. It had an encrusting growth habit or, in the case of C. fungiforme, formed cup-shaped colonies. Its colonies possessed a vesicular skeleton and monticules. Its cyst-like interzooecial spaces are a distinguishing feature.

== Species ==
- Crassaluna epidermata (Ulrich, 1890)
- Crassaluna cystata (Conti, 1990)
- Crassaluna fungiforme (Ernst and Key, 2007)
