= Eridotrypa =

Scientific classification
- Kingdom: Animalia
- Phylum: Bryozoa
- Class: Stenolaemata
- Order: †Trepostomatida
- Family: †Aisenvergiidae
- Genus: †Eridotrypa; Ulrich, 1893

Extinct genus of bryozoans

Eridotrypa is an extinct genus of bryozoans of the family Aisenvergiidae, consistently forming colonies made of thin branches (only about 1 to 2.25 millimeters wide). Diaphragms are very common in colonies. Distinctively, in the exozone there are serrated dark borders separating the autozooecia.
