= Polycylindricus =

Scientific classification
- Kingdom: Animalia
- Phylum: Bryozoa
- Class: Stenolaemata
- Order: †Trepostomatida
- Family: †Aisenvergiidae
- Genus: †Polycylindricus; Boardman, 1960

Extinct genus of bryozoans

Polycylindricus is an extinct genus of bryozoans of the order Trepostomatida with colonies forming cylindrical branches. In addition to branching created where main branches bifurcate, colonies also have smaller secondary branches perpendicular to the main branches.
