= Tarphophragma =

Scientific classification
- Kingdom: Animalia
- Phylum: Bryozoa
- Class: Stenolaemata
- Order: †Trepostomatida
- Family: †Halloporidae
- Genus: †Tarphophragma; Karklins, 1984

Extinct genus of bryozoans

Tarphophragma is an extinct genus of Middle and Upper Ordovician bryozoans of the family Halloporidae. Its colonies began from an encrusting base and grew into branching structures. Raised maculae made from mesozooecia and large autozooecia (sometimes called megazooecia) covered the colony's surface, and its autozooecia were arranged in a disorderly pattern. Its interzooidal budding pattern and integrate wall structure distinguish it from other genera.
