= Coscinium =

Coscinium may refer to:

- Coscinium (plant), a genus of plants in the family Menispermaceae
- Coscinium (bryozoan), an extinct genus of prehistoric bryozoans in the family Hexagonellidae
