= Dyscritella =

Scientific classification
- Kingdom: Animalia
- Phylum: Bryozoa
- Class: Stenolaemata
- Order: †Trepostomatida
- Family: †Dyscritellidae
- Genus: †Dyscritella; Girty, 1911

Extinct genus of bryozoans

Dyscritella is an extinct genus of trepostome bryozoan that was highly successful in the late Triassic period, re-colonizing high latitudes in the northern hemisphere after the extinction of earlier bryozoan genera. Dyscritella was an "ecological opportunist" and widely distributed, found in every climatic belt.
