= Hemiphragma (bryozoan) =

Hemiphragma Temporal range: 488.3–445.6 Ma

Scientific classification
- Kingdom: Animalia
- Phylum: Bryozoa
- Class: Stenolaemata
- Order: †Trepostomida
- Family: †Dittoporidae
- Genus: †Hemiphragma; Ulrich, 1893

Extinct genus of bryozoans

Hemiphragma is an extinct genus of Middle Ordovician bryozoan. It had branching colonies with thick-walled zooecial apertures and lots of acanthopores, but few mesopores.
