= Arthrostylidae =

Scientific classification
- Kingdom: Animalia
- Phylum: Bryozoa
- Class: Stenolaemata
- Order: †Cryptostomida
- Suborder: †Rhabdomesina
- Family: †Arthrostylidae; Ulrich, 1882

Genera
- See text

Extinct family of bryozoans

Arthrostylidae is an extinct family of bryozoans of the order Cryptostomida. Their colonies commonly possess articulated joints which provide flexibility.

== Genera ==
Arthrostylidae includes the following genera:

- Arcanopora (Shrubsole & Vine, 1882)
- Arthroclema (Billings, 1865)
- Arthrostyloecia (Bassler, 1952)
- Arthrostylus (Ulrich, 1882)
- Arthrotrypa (Lobdell, 1992)
- Cuneatopora (Siegfried, 1963)
- Cyclophaenopora (Spjeldnaes, 1985)
- Glauconome (Goldfuss, 1826)
- Helopora (Hall, 1851)
- Heminematopora (Bassler, 1952)
- Hemiulrichostylus (Bassler, 1952)
- Hexites (Shulga-Nesterenko, 1955)
- Hithisipora (Schallreuter & Hinz-Schallreuter, 2010)
- Matsutrypa (Gorjunova, 1985)
- Mediaporina (Pushkin, 1990)
- Nematopora (Ulrich, 1888)
- Nematoporella (Lobdell, 1992)
- Osburnostylus (Bassler, 1952)
- Ottoseetaxis (Bassler, 1952)
- Paracuneatopora (Ernst, 2008)
- Permoheloclema (Ozhgibesov, 1983)
- Pseudonematopora (Balakin, 1974)
- Sceptropora (Ulrich, 1888)
- Tropidopora (Hall, 1886)
- Ulrichostylus (Bassler, 1952)
- Veroclema (Gorjunova, 1992)
