= Pharopora =

Scientific classification
- Kingdom: Animalia
- Phylum: Bryozoa
- Class: Stenolaemata
- Order: †Cryptostomida
- Family: †Rhabdomesidae
- Genus: †Pharopora; Wyse Jackson, Ernst & Suárez Andrés, 2017

Extinct genus of bryozoans

Pharopora is an extinct genus of bryozoan of the family Rhabdomesidae that lived in the Mississippian period. It is characterized by colonies with branches possessing regular internodes and articulating cone-shaped terminations. It is the first genus of bryozoan in the family Rhabdomesidae with articulated (jointed) parts in its colonies.
