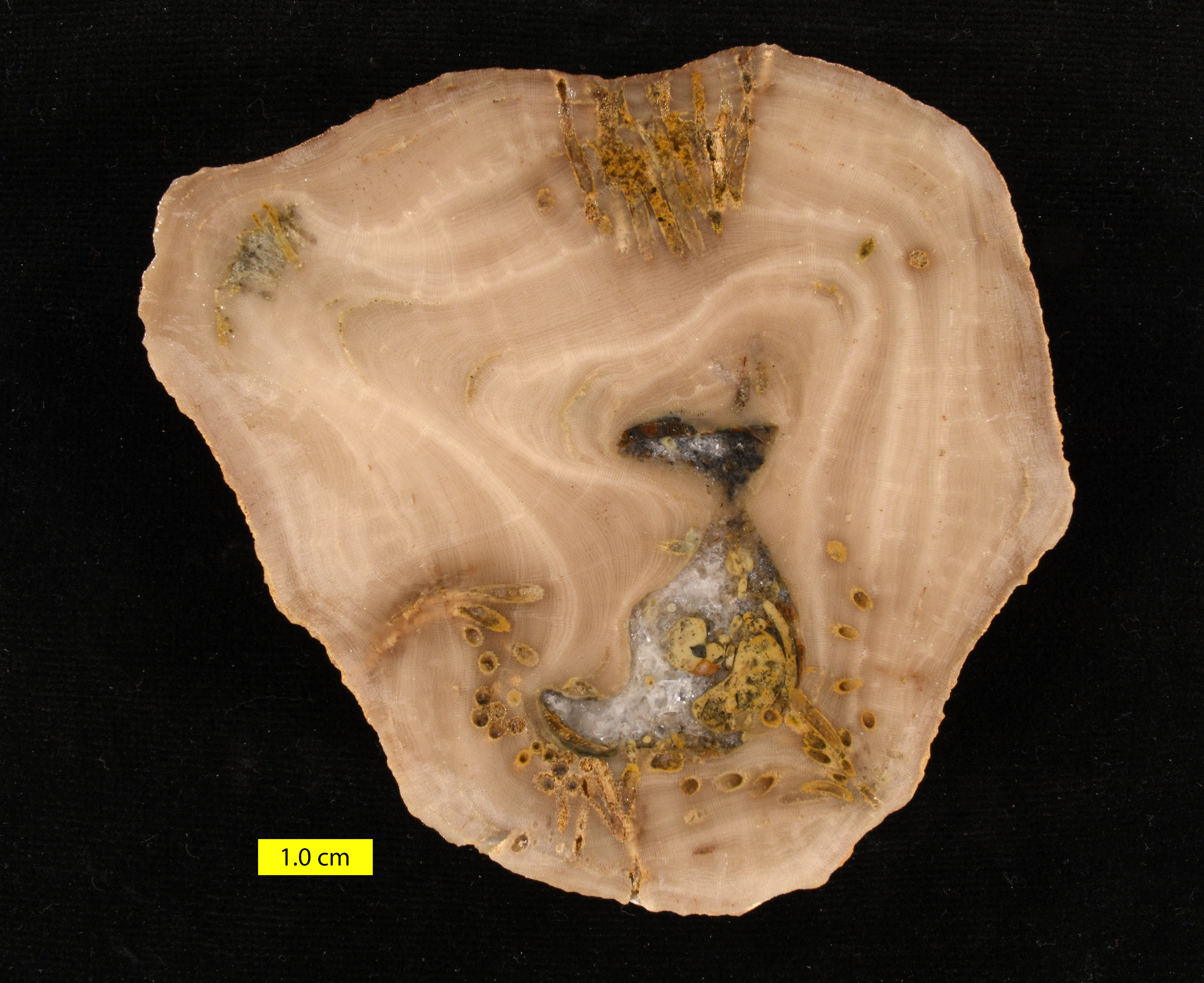
- Polished section of the Upper Ordovician bryozoan Amplexopora with Trypanites borings. Collected in northern Kentucky.

Scientific classification
- Kingdom: Animalia
- Phylum: Bryozoa
- Class: Stenolaemata
- Order: †Trepostomatida
- Family: †Amplexoporidae
- Genus: †Amplexopora; Ulrich, 1882

= Amplexopora =

Amplexopora Temporal range: from Ordovician to Permian, 466.0–268.0 Ma

Extinct genus of moss animals

Amplexopora is a genus of bryozoans of the family Amplexoporidae, known in the rock record from the Ordovician to the Permian periods. Species belonging to this genus were stationary epifaunal suspension feeders. Their colonies showed a very great variety in shapes.

== Selected species ==
- Amplexopora conferta (Coryell, 1921)
- Amplexopora gigantea (Termier and Termier 1971)
- Amplexopora tezakensis (Termier and Termier 1971)
- Amplexopora minnesotensis (Ulrich, 1893)
- Amplexopora winchelli (Ulrich, 1886)

== Distribution ==
Fossils of this genus have been found in Permian of Afghanistan, in Silurian of Norway, Russia and United Kingdom and in Ordovician of Argentina, Australia, Canada, France, United States.
