= Rhombotrypa =

Scientific classification
- Kingdom: Animalia
- Phylum: Bryozoa
- Class: Stenolaemata
- Order: †Trepostomatida
- Family: †Amplexoporidae
- Genus: †Rhombotrypa; Ulrich & Bassler, 1904

Species
- Rhombotrypa multitabulata Utgaard & Perry, 1964; Rhombotrypa quadrata (Rominger, 1866); Rhombotrypa ramulosa Bassler, 1923; Rhombotrypa subquadrata (Ulrich, 1882)

Extinct genus of bryozoans

Rhombotrypa is an extinct trepostome bryozoan genus from the Ordovician Period, first described in 1866 by Carl Ludwig Rominger. Rhombotrypa quadrata is one of the few trepostome bryozoans known from the Cincinnatian that can be recognized externally, without analyzing the internal structure of the fossils.
