= Ptilodictya =

Ptilodictya Temporal range: 460.9–383.7 Ma

Scientific classification
- Kingdom: Animalia
- Phylum: Bryozoa
- Class: Stenolaemata
- Order: †Cryptostomida
- Family: †Ptilodictyidae
- Genus: †Ptilodictya; Lonsdale, 1839

Type species
- †Ptilodictya lanceolata (Goldfuss, 1826)

Synonyms
- Heterodictya Nicholson, 1875

Extinct genus of bryozoans

Ptilodictya is an extinct genus of bryozoan of the family Ptilodictyidae. It formed bifoliate branched colonies, with branches ranging from under 1 to 3 mm wide. Colonies' autozooecia are rectangular and autozooecial apertures are in the shape of rounded rectangles.

== Species ==
Species include:

- †Ptilodictya ensiformis (Hall, 1852)
- †Ptilodictya gladiola Billings, 1866
- †Ptilodictya sulcata Billings, 1866
- †Ptilodictya exiliformis Ernst, 2007
