= Characodoma elegans =

Scientific classification
- Kingdom: Animalia
- Phylum: Bryozoa
- Class: Gymnolaemata
- Order: Cheilostomatida
- Family: Cleidochasmatidae
- Genus: Characodoma
- Species: C. elegans

Binomial name
- Characodoma elegans (Lu, 1991)

Synonyms
- Hippoporina elegans Lu, 1991

Species of moss animal

Characodoma elegans is a species of bryozoans. It is found in the South China Sea.
