= Dianulites =

Scientific classification
- Kingdom: Animalia
- Phylum: Bryozoa
- Class: Stenolaemata
- Order: †Trepostomida
- Family: †Dianulitidae
- Genus: †Dianulites; Eichwald, 1829

Extinct genus of bryozoan

Dianulites is an extinct genus of bryozoans from the early Ordovician period, belonging to the family Dianulitidae. Its colonies can be turbinate, horn-shaped, conical, or massive and hemispherical. Individual zooecia take the form of long, thin-walled polygonal tubes. It lacks styles (acanthopores), which helps differentiate it from similar genus Nicholsonella.
