= Utgaardostylus =

Scientific classification
- Kingdom: Animalia
- Phylum: Bryozoa
- Class: Stenolaemata
- Order: †Trepostomida
- Family: †Dyscritellidae
- Genus: †Utgaardostylus; Gilmour, 2014
- Species: †U. stylata

Binomial name
- †Utgaardostylus stylata Gilmour, 2014

Extinct genus of bryozoans

Utgaardostylus is an extinct Permian bryozoan genus of the family Dyscritellidae. It was discovered in northeastern Nevada.
