= Nicholsonella =

Scientific classification
- Kingdom: Animalia
- Phylum: Bryozoa
- Class: Stenolaemata
- Order: †Trepostomatida
- Family: †incertae sedis
- Genus: †Nicholsonella; Ulrich, 1890

Species
- See text

Extinct genus of bryozoans

Nicholsonella is an extinct genus of bryozoans of uncertain taxonomic placement. Its colonies can take the forms of thick branching masses or branches.

== Species ==
- †Nicholsonella acanthobscura McKinney, 1971
- †Nicholsonella adumbrata Modzalevskaya, 1977
- †Nicholsonella amplexa Kopajevich, 1984
- †Nicholsonella antiqua Yabe & Hayasaka, 1920
- †Nicholsonella divulgata Ernst & Key, 2007
- †Nicholsonella faveolata Pushkin, 1987
- †Nicholsonella genuina Astrova, 1965
- †Nicholsonella houi Yang, 1957
- †Nicholsonella inflecta McKinney, 1971
- †Nicholsonella irregularis Loeblich, 1942
- †Nicholsonella laminata Ulrich, 1893
- †Nicholsonella mariae Astrova, 1965
- †Nicholsonella moniliformis Loeblich, 1942
- †Nicholsonella nelidovi Nekhorosheva, 1965
- †Nicholsonella ottawaensis Wilson, 1921
- †Nicholsonella parafrondifera McKinney, 1971
- †Nicholsonella parva Owen, 1965
- †Nicholsonella parvula Bassler, 1928
- †Nicholsonella peculiara Yaroshinskaya, 1984
- †Nicholsonella peculiaris Cumings & Galloway, 1913
- †Nicholsonella petaloides Astrova, 1965
- †Nicholsonella polaris Modzalevskaya in Modzalevskaya & Nekhoroshev, 1955
- †Nicholsonella polymorpha Kopajevich, 1984
- †Nicholsonella ponderosa Ulrich, 1890
- †Nicholsonella pseudopulchra Modzalevskaya, 1977
- †Nicholsonella pulchra Ulrich, 1893
- †Nicholsonella recta Ernst & Key, 2007
- †Nicholsonella ringuebergi Bassler, 1906
- †Nicholsonella vaupeli (Ulrich, 1883)
- †Nicholsonella vaupeliformis Modzalevskaya in Modzalevskaya & Nekhoroshev, 1955
- †Nicholsonella wilsonae Fritz, 1957
