= Orectodictya =

Orectodictya Temporal range: 460.9–455.8 Ma

Scientific classification
- Kingdom: Animalia
- Phylum: Bryozoa
- Class: Stenolaemata
- Order: †Cryptostomida
- Family: †Rhinidictyidae
- Genus: †Orectodictya; Karklins, 1983
- Species: †O. pansa

Binomial name
- †Orectodictya pansa Karklins, 1983

Genus of ptilodictyoid bryozoans

Orectodictya is an extinct genus of ptilodictyoid bryozoans known from Ordovician fossils found in the U.S. state of Kentucky. It is monotypic, containing the single species Orectodictya pansa.
