= Fistuliphragma =

Fistuliphragma Temporal range: Lower Devonian Emsian

Scientific classification
- Kingdom: Animalia
- Phylum: Bryozoa
- Class: Stenolaemata
- Order: †Cystoporida
- Family: †Fistuliporidae
- Genus: †Fistuliphragma; Bassler, 1934

Type species
- Fistuliphragma spinulifera (Rominger, 1866)

Species
- Fistuliphragma fasciculus Mesentseva, 2016; Fistuliphragma moniliformis Mesentseva, 2016; Fistuliphragma sibirica Mesentseva, 2016; Fistuliphragma tenuis Ernst & May, 2012

Extinct genus of cystoporate bryozoan

Fistuliphragma is an extinct genus of cystoporate bryozoans of the family Fistuliporidae that lived in the Devonian period. Its colonies could have branched or encrusting forms, with hollow tubular branches in the case of the branched form, and possessed a well-developed vesicular skeleton. Its autozooecia possessed prominent lunaria and hemiphragms. The genus is distinct from Cliotrypa and Strotopora because of the absence of gonozooecia.
