= Wyseotrypa =

Scientific classification
- Kingdom: Animalia
- Phylum: Bryozoa
- Class: Stenolaemata
- Order: †Cryptostomida
- Family: †Hyphasmoporidae
- Genus: †Wyseotrypa; Gilmour, 2014

Extinct genus of bryozoans

Wyseotrypa is an extinct Permian genus of bryozoans of the family Hyphasmoporidae. It was discovered in northeastern Nevada.
