= Stenopora =

Stenopora Temporal range: 457.5–221.5 Ma

Scientific classification
- Kingdom: Animalia
- Phylum: Bryozoa
- Class: Stenolaemata
- Order: †Trepostomatida
- Family: †Stenoporidae
- Genus: †Stenopora; Lonsdale, 1844

Type species
- Stenopora tasmaniensis Lonsdale, 1844

Extinct genus of bryozoan

Stenopora is an extinct genus of bryozoans first described in 1845, using material collected by Charles Darwin. Its colonies can be branching, frondescent, encrusting, or massive, and shapes display variation even within single colonies. Diaphragms are absent and acanthostyles of uniform size surround its zooecial apertures.
