= Lichenalia =

Lichenalia Temporal range: 455.8–383.7 Ma

Scientific classification
- Kingdom: Animalia
- Phylum: Bryozoa
- Class: Stenolaemata
- Order: †Cystoporida
- Family: †Rhinoporidae
- Genus: †Lichenalia

Species
- See text

Extinct genus of bryozoans

Lichenalia is an extinct genus of cystoporate bryozoan of the family Rhinoporidae, known from the Upper Ordovician to the Middle Silurian. Its colonies could form hollow branched or tube-shaped colonies or have an encrusting growth habit. It possessed prominent lunaria and a vesicular skeleton. As in other members of Rhinoporidae, the vesicular skeleton contained tunnels that appeared like ridges on the surface of the colony. Their purpose is unknown, but they may have been used as brooding chambers.

== Species ==
- †Lichenalia carinata Hall, 1881
- †Lichenalia concentrica Hall, 1852
- †Lichenalia crustacea Hall, 1881
- †Lichenalia escharense (Prout, 1859)
- †Lichenalia nodata Ernst & Key, 2007
- †Lichenalia pakriensis Gorjunova, 1992
- †Lichenalia radiata Hall, 1881
- †Lichenalia utricula (Bassler, 1928)
