= Arthrostyloecia =

Scientific classification
- Kingdom: Animalia
- Phylum: Bryozoa
- Class: Stenolaemata
- Order: †Cryptostomida
- Family: †Arthrostylidae
- Genus: †Arthrostyloecia; Bassler, 1952
- Species: †A. nitida

Binomial name
- †Arthrostyloecia nitida Bassler, 1952

Extinct genus of bryozoan

Arthrostyloecia is an extinct genus of bryozoan of the family Arthrostylidae, that lived in the Ordovician period. Its colonies are articulated, distinctively containing ball and socket joints. It contains a single species, Arthrostyloecia nitida.
