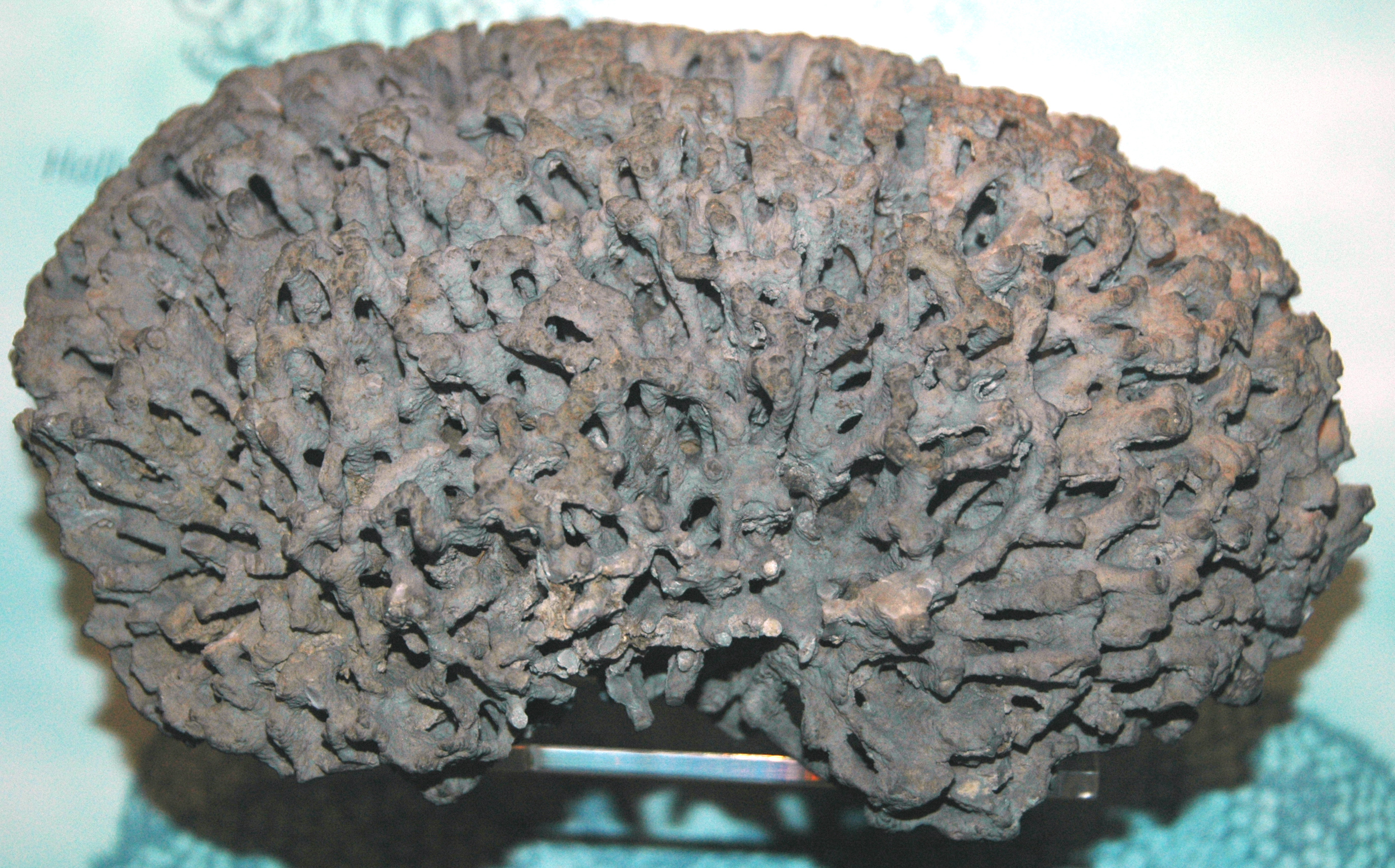
- Hallopora multitabulata, Ordovician, Frankfort, Illinois

Scientific classification
- Kingdom: Animalia
- Phylum: Bryozoa
- Class: Stenolaemata
- Order: †Trepostomatida
- Family: †Halloporidae
- Genus: †Hallopora; Bassler, 1911

Synonyms
- Callopora Hall, 1851

= Hallopora =

Extinct genus of moss animals

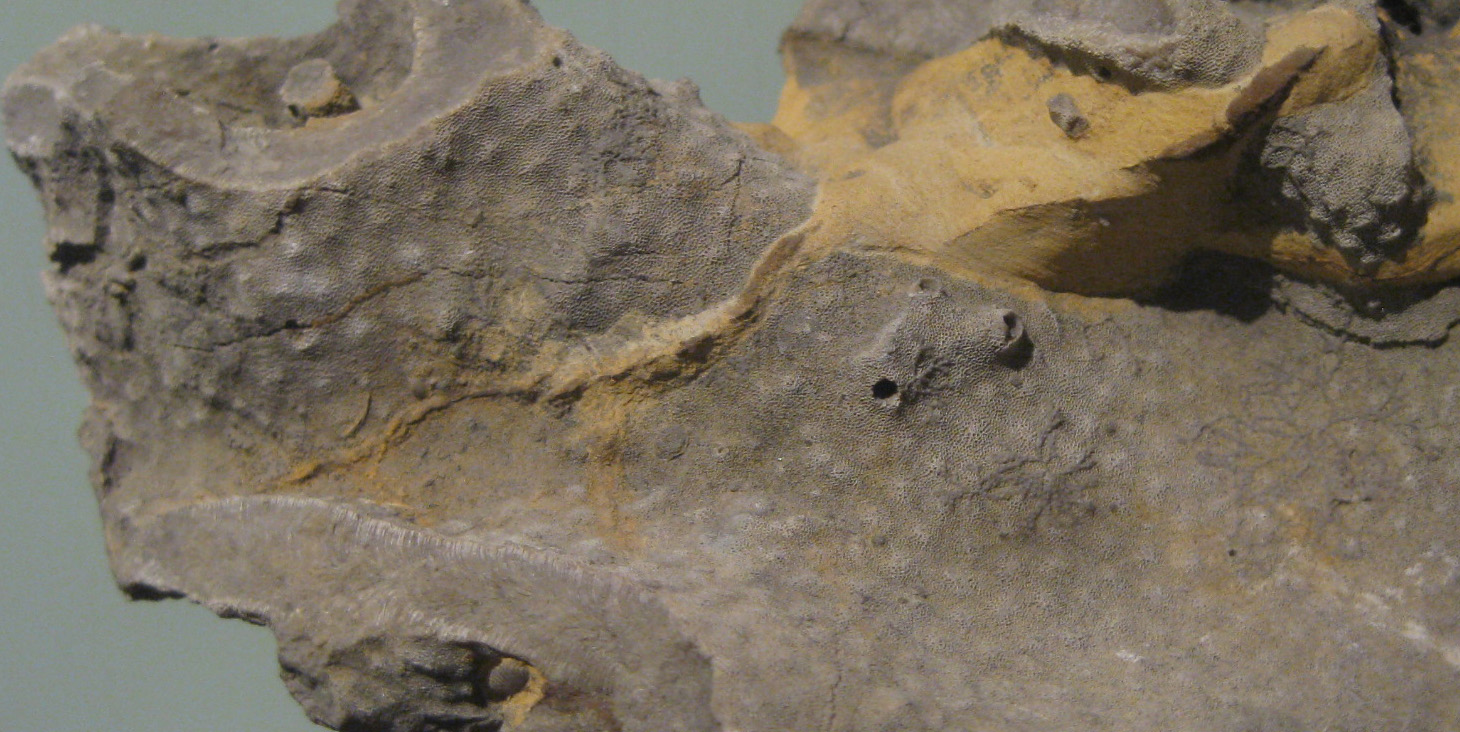
Detail of fossil Hallopora on display at Smithsonian, Washington, DC

Hallopora is an extinct genus of bryozoans of the family Halloporidae, first identified from the Lower Silurian period. They can be found in Ohio, Indiana, and Kentucky of the Midwestern United States, commonly in the Ordovician Kope Formation.

== Species ==
- Hallopora elegantula (Hall, 1852)
- Hallopora baltica
- Hallopora magnopora
