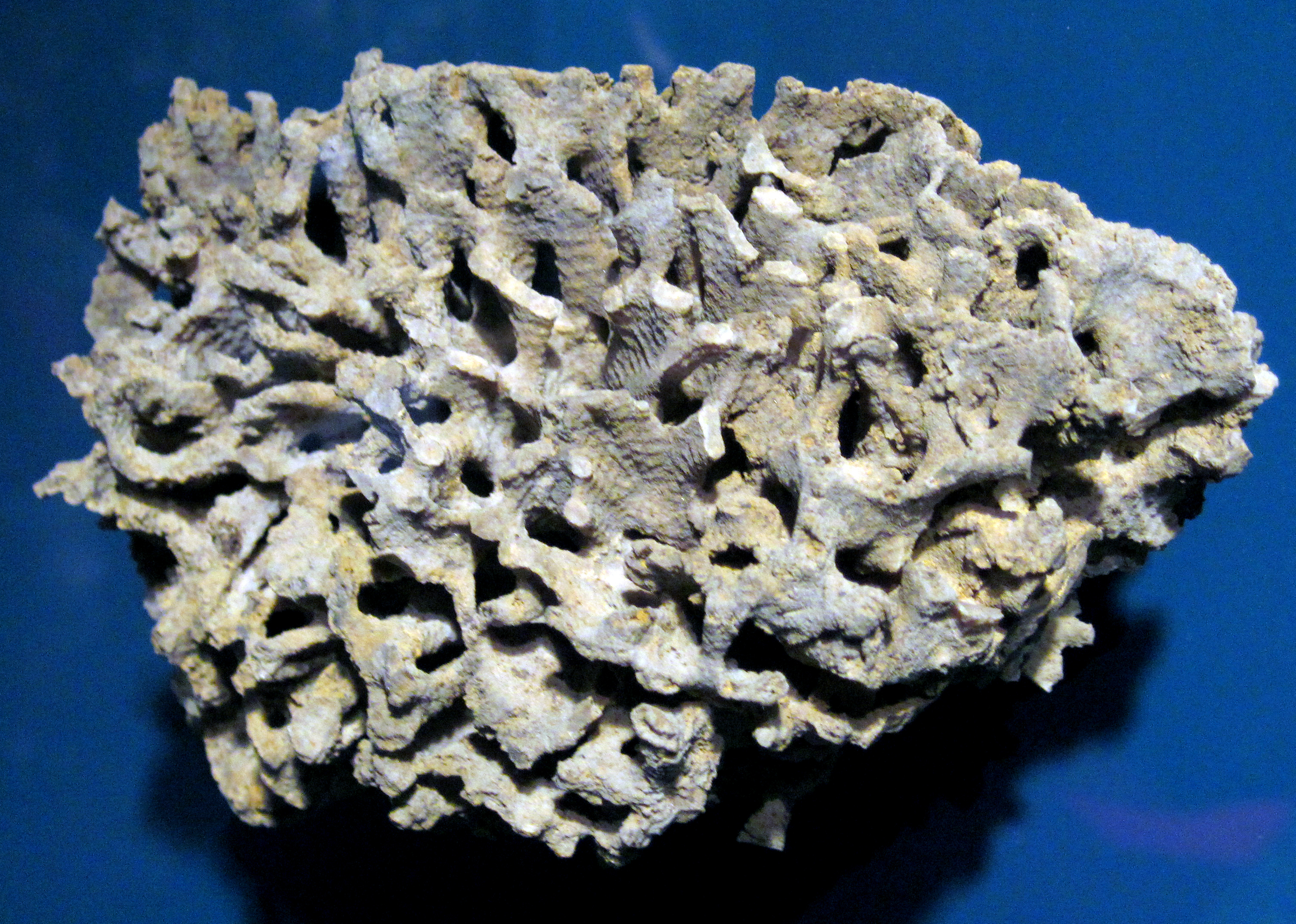
- Fistulipora neglecta

Scientific classification
- Kingdom: Animalia
- Phylum: Bryozoa
- Class: Stenolaemata
- Order: †Cystoporida
- Suborder: †Fistuliporina
- Family: †Fistuliporidae; Ulrich, 1882

= Fistuliporidae =

Fistuliporidae Temporal range: 471.8–205.6 Ma

Extinct family of bryozoans

Fistuliporidae is an extinct family of bryozoans within the order Cystoporida. Members of this family have lived from the early Ordovician to the late Triassic period.

== Genera ==
- †Acantholunaria Ernst, Munneke & Oswald, 2015
- †Buskopora Ulrich, 1886
- †Canutrypa Bassler, 1952
- †Cassianopora Bizzarini & Braga, 1978
- †Cheilotrypa Ulrich, 1884
- †Cliocystiramus Lu, 1983
- †Cliotrypa Ulrich & Bassler, 1929
- †Coelocaulis Hall & Simpson, 1887
- †Curvipora Ernst, Munneke & Oswald, 2015
- †Cycloidotrypa Chapman, 1920
- †Cyclotrypa Ulrich, 1896
- †Cystiramus Morozova, 1959
- †Cystitrypa Schäfer & Fois, 1987
- †Cystomeson Ernst, Krainer & Lucas, 2018
- †Diamesopora Hall, 1852
- †Duncanoclema Bassler, 1952
- †Dybowskiella Waagen & Wentzel, 1886
- †Eofistulotrypa Morozova, 1959
- †Eridopora Ulrich, 1882
- †Fistulacanta Modzalevskaya, 1979
- †Fistuliphragma Canu & Bassler in Bassler, 1934
- †Fistuliphragmoides Gorjunova, 2003
- †Fistulipora McCoy, 1849
- †Fistuliporella Simpson, 1897
- †Fistuliporidra Simpson, 1897
- †Fistuliramus Astrova, 1960
- †Fistulocladia Bassler, 1929
- †Fistulotrypa Bassler, 1929
- †Kasakhstanella Nekhoroshev, 1956
- †Lichenotrypa Ulrich, 1886
- †Odontotrypa Hall, 1886
- †Parametelipora Morozova, 1986
- †Pholidopora Grubbs, 1839
- †Physallidopora Ernst & Buttler, 2012
- †Pileotrypa Hall, 1886
- †Pinacotrypa Ulrich in Miller, 1889
- †Realeksella Gorjunova, 1993
- †Selenopora Hall, 1886
- †Stellatoides Ernst, Taylor & Bohatý, 2014
- †Strotopora Ulrich in Miller, 1889
- †Velbertopora Tolokonnikova, Ernst & Herbig, 2014
- †Xiapora Ernst & Gorgij, 2013
