= Clausotrypa =

Clausotrypa Temporal range: 346.7–254.17 Ma

Scientific classification
- Kingdom: Animalia
- Phylum: Bryozoa
- Class: Stenolaemata
- Order: †Cryptostomida
- Family: †Nematotrypidae
- Genus: †Clausotrypa; Bassler, 1929

Species
- †Clausotrypa clara Kruchinina, 1986; †Clausotrypa conferta Bassler, 1929; †Clausotrypa costata Romantchuk, 1981; †Clausotrypa elegans Liu, 1980; †Clausotrypa minor Bassler, 1929; †Clausotrypa monstruosa Morozova, 1970; †Clausotrypa monticola (Eichwald, 1860); †Clausotrypa petaloides Romantchuk, 1970; †Clausotrypa separata Bassler, 1929 (type); †Clausotrypa spinosa Fritz, 1932; †Clausotrypa thaiensis (Sakagami, 1970)

Synonyms
- Nemacanthopora Termier & Termier, 1971

Extinct genus of moss animals

Clausotrypa is an extinct genus of prehistoric bryozoans in the family Nematotrypidae. The species C. elegans is from a Wordian (Permian) marine horizon in the Sijiashan Formation of Northeast China.
