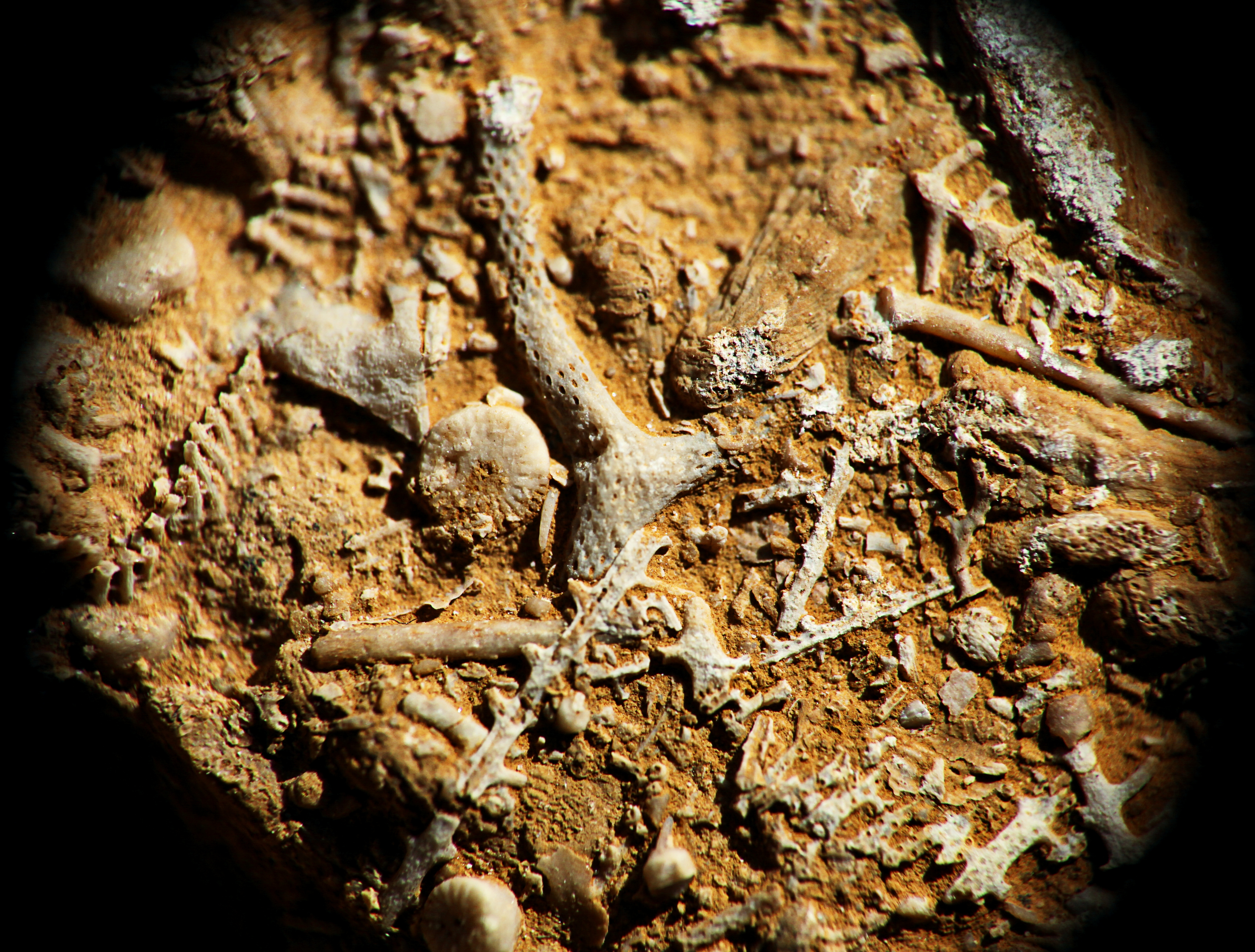

Scientific classification
- Kingdom: Animalia
- Phylum: Bryozoa
- Class: Stenolaemata
- Order: †Cryptostomida
- Family: †Rhomboporidae
- Genus: †Rhombopora; Meek, 1872

= Rhombopora =

Rhombopora Temporal range: 457.5–252.17 Ma Ordovician - Permian

Extinct genus of moss animals

Rhombopora is an extinct genus of bryozoans. It existed from the Ordovician to Permian period (457.50 - 252.17 million years ago).

== Species ==
Species	Discoverer(s)	Year	Time Period	Location
Rhombopora aleksandrae	Schulga-Nesterenko	1955	Carboniferous Pennsylvanian Moscovian	Russia Russian Platform
Rhombopora ambigua	Katzer	1898	Devonian Pragian-Eifelian	Brazil
Rhombopora angustata	Ulrich	1890	Early Carboniferous Visean	Kentucky, USA
Rhombopora annulus	Liu	1980	Early Permian	China
Rhombopora armata	Ulrich	1884	Early Carboniferous Visean-Namurian	USA Kentucky
Rhombopora armata ovalis	Nikiforova	1927	Early Carboniferous	Ukraine Donbass
Rhombopora attenuata	Ulrich	1890	Early Carboniferous Visean	USA Arkansas, Oklahoma
Rhombopora bedfordensis	Cumings	1906	Early Carboniferous Visean	USA Indiana
Rhombopora bifurcata	Campbell	1961	Carboniferous	Australia NSW
Rhombopora bigemmis	Keyserling	1846	Permian	Russia
Rhombopora binodata	Trizna	1958	Lower Carboniferous Visean	Russia, China
Rhombopora biseptata	Yang, Hu & Xia	1988	Late Devonian Famennian	China
Rhombopora blakei	Hageman, Wyse Jackson, Abernethy & Steinthorsdottir	2011	Mississippian Tournaisian	Ireland
Rhombopora circumcincta	Reed	1933	Permo-Carboniferous	Burma
Rhombopora communis	Moore	1929	Late Carboniferous Gzhelian	USA Texas
Rhombopora constans	Moore	1929	Late Carboniferous Gzhelian	USA Texas
Rhombopora constans ampla	Moore	1929	Late Carboniferous Gzhelian	USA Texas
Rhombopora corticata	Moore	1929	Late Carboniferous Gzhelian Permian	USA Texas and Bolivia
Rhombopora crassa	Lu	1983	Early Carboniferous Visean	China
Rhombopora cylindrica	Wyse Jackson	1996	Lower Carboniferous Tournaisian-Serpukhovian	Ireland
Rhombopora dangdouensis	Liu	1993	Devonian	China
Rhombopora decipiens	Ulrich	1890	Early Carboniferous Visean	USA Illinois
Rhombopora dispersa	Bigey	1988	Devonian	France
Rhombopora esthoniae	Bassler	1911	Silurian Ordovician	Estonia
Rhombopora famensis	Nekhoroshev	1960	Devonian Famennian	Russia
Rhombopora favata	Moore	1929	Late Carboniferous Gzhelian	USA Texas
Rhombopora filiformis	Crockford	1941	Early Permian Artinskian	Australia NSW
Rhombopora floriformis	Trizna	1958	Early Carboniferous Tournaisian	Russia
Rhombopora foerstei	Elias	1957	Carboniferous Mississippian Serpukhovian	USA Oklahoma
Rhombopora gippslandica	Chapman	1907	Silurian or Devonian	Australia
Rhombopora gracilescens	Li	1992	Devonian	China
Rhombopora gracilis	Ulrich	1890	Lower Carboniferous Tournaisian-Visean	USA Iowa, Missouri
Rhombopora granulata	Liu	1980	Early Permian	China
Rhombopora gratiosa	Bassler	1929	Permian	Afghanistan
Rhombopora hexagona	Wyse Jackson	1996	Lower Carboniferous Tournaisian-Visean	Ireland
Rhombopora hindei	Etheridge	1907	Early Permian	Australia
Rhombopora hoxtolgayensis	Lu	1999	Devonian	China
Rhombopora hunanensis	Yang, Hu & Xia	1988	Devonian Famennian	China
Rhombopora inermis	Yang & Xia	1976	Silurian	China Yunnan
Rhombopora inornata	Yang, Hu & Xia	1988	Devonian Famennian	China
Rhombopora insinuata	Trizna	1958	Lower Carboniferous Visean	Russia
Rhombopora inspissata	Yang, Hu & Xia	1988	Devonian Famennian	China
Rhombopora irregularis	Tolmatchoff	1924	Early Carboniferous	Russia
Rhombopora johnsvalleyensis	Harlton	1933	Late Carboniferous Bashkirian	USA Oklahoma
Rhombopora kawabei	Sakagami	1995	Permian Leonardian	Bolivia
Rhombopora kokpektensis	Nekhoroshev	1956	Early Carboniferous Serpukhovian	Russia Altai
Rhombopora kunlunensis	Lu	1983	Permian	China Xinjiang
Rhombopora laxa	Etheridge	1872	Early Permian Sakmarian-Artinskian	Australia
Rhombopora lepidodendroides	Meek	1872	Carboniferous (Penn.)	USA
Rhombopora lepidodendroides multinodata	Nikiforova	1933	Late Carboniferous Moscovian	Ukraine
Rhombopora lepidodendroides mutabilis	Nikiforova	1933	Late Carboniferous Moscovian	Ukraine
Rhombopora lineinodis	Ulrich	1890	Middle Devonian Eifelian	USA Indiana
Rhombopora lineinodis humilis	Ulrich	1890	Middle Devonian Eifelian	USA Indiana
Rhombopora longyinensis	Xsia	1979	Late Palaeozoic	China
Rhombopora maanshanensis	Yang	1964	Devonian Famennian	China
Rhombopora magna	Volkova	1974	Devonian Frasnian	Russia
Rhombopora mariae	Morozova	1961	Devonian Frasnian-Famennian	Russia
Rhombopora mawi	Owen	1965	Silurian Wenlockian	Wales, England
Rhombopora media	Yang, Hu & Xia	1988	Devonian Frasnian	China
Rhombopora millepuncta	McFarlan	1942	Lower Carboniferous Serpukhovian	USA Illinois
Rhombopora millepuncta recta	McFarlan	1942	Lower Carboniferous Serpukhovian	USA Illinois
Rhombopora minima	Tolmatchoff	1924	Early Carboniferous	Russia
Rhombopora minutula	Ernst & Königshof	2010	Middle Devonian Givetian	Western Sahara
Rhombopora mira	Xsia	1979	Late Palaeozoic	China
Rhombopora missouriensis	Branson	1922	Devonian Frasnian	USA Missouri
Rhombopora multiangularis	Portlock	1843	Carboniferous Mississippian	Ireland
Rhombopora multigranulata	Bretnall	1926	Permian	Western Australia Thailand
Rhombopora multipora	Foerste	1887	Carboniferous Mississippian	USA Illinois
Rhombopora multituberculata	Nekhoroshev	1977	Devonian Famennian	Russia
Rhombopora munda	Moore	1929	Late Carboniferous Gzhelian	USA Texas
Rhombopora muralis	Moore	1929	Late Carboniferous Gzhelian	USA Texas
Rhombopora nikiforovae	Baranova	1960	Early Permian Sakmarian-Artinskian	Russia
Rhombopora nitidula	Harlton	1933	Late Carboniferous Bashkirian	USA Oklahoma
Rhombopora nova	Ceretti	1963	Late Carboniferous Gzhelian	Italy
Rhombopora novitia	Trizna	1958	Lower Carboniferous Visean	Russia
Rhombopora obliqua	Waagen	1887	Permian	India
Rhombopora oculata	Phillips	1836	Carboniferous Mississippian	England
Rhombopora ohioensis	Ulrich	1888	Lower Carboniferous Tournaisian	USA, Ohio
Rhombopora optima	Gorjunova	1975	Early Permian Artinskian	Tajikistan Pamir
Rhombopora ornata	Shishova	1964	Permian Kazanian	Russian Platform
Rhombopora parallela	Phillips	1836	Carboniferous Mississippian	England
Rhombopora permiana	Baranova	1960	Early Permian Artinskian	Russia, China
Rhombopora perpera	Trizna	1958	Lower Carboniferous Visean	Russia
Rhombopora pesasica	Tolmatchoff	1924	Early Carboniferous	Russia
Rhombopora picchuensis	Chronic	1949	Early Permian	Peru
Rhombopora pilula	Moore	1929	Late Carboniferous Gzhelian	USA Texas
Rhombopora polyporata	Waagen	1887	Permian Guadalupian	India
Rhombopora praemultituberculata	Yaroshinskaya	1984	Devonian	Russia
Rhombopora praevarians	Nekhoroshev	1977	Middle Devonian Givetian	Russia
Rhombopora preciosa	Tung	1985	Carboniferous	China
Rhombopora prima	Lu	1999	Devonian	China Xinjiang
Rhombopora prompta	Gorjunova	1988	Lower Carboniferous Visean-Serpukhovian	Mongolia
Rhombopora pulchella	Ulrich	1884	Carboniferous Mississippian	USA Kentucky
Rhombopora roikensi	Tolmatchoff	1924	Early Carboniferous	Russia
Rhombopora saffordotaxiformis	Yang, Hu & Xia	1988	Lower Carboniferous Tournaisian	China Hunan
Rhombopora sarcinulata	Trizna	1958	Lower Carboniferous Tournaisian	Russia
Rhombopora schellwieni	Johnsen	1906	Permian	Austria
Rhombopora similis	Phillips	1841	Middle Devonian Givetian	England
Rhombopora simplex	Trizna	1958	Lower Carboniferous Tournaisian-Visean	Russia, China
Rhombopora snideri	Mather	1915	Carboniferous Pennsylvanian Bashkirian	USA Oklahoma
Rhombopora spicularis	Phillips	1836	Carboniferous Mississippian	England
Rhombopora spirala	Yang, Hu & Xia	1988	Late Devonian Famennian	China
Rhombopora spiralis	Ulrich	1890	Lower Carboniferous Visean	USA Kentucky
Rhombopora subcrassa	Coryell	1924	Carboniferous Pennsylvanian	USA Oklahoma
Rhombopora subtilis	Nekhoroshev	1977	Devonian Famennian	Russia
Rhombopora sulcifera	Ulrich	1890	Middle Devonian Givetian	USA Iowa
Rhombopora tenuirama	Ulrich	1890	Carboniferous Mississippian	USA
Rhombopora tenuis	Hinde	1890	Permian Cisuralian Sakmarian	Australia WA
Rhombopora tersiensis	Tolmatchoff	1924	Early Carboniferous	Russia
Rhombopora transversalis	Ulrich	1890	Carboniferous Mississippian Visean	USA Illinois
Rhombopora tuberculata	Nekhoroshev	1948	Carboniferous Pennsylvanian	Kazakhstan Pribalkhash
Rhombopora ulrichi	Elias	1957	Carboniferous Mississippian Serpukhovian	USA Oklahoma
Rhombopora variaxis	Schulga-Nesterenko	1955	Lower Carboniferous Serpukhovian	Russian Platform
Rhombopora vera	Dunaeva	1961	Upper Carboniferous Kasimovian	Ukraine
Rhombopora vinculariformis	Vine	1885	Carboniferous Mississippian	England
Rhombopora wortheni	Ulrich	1884	Lower Carboniferous Visean	USA Kentucky, Arizona
Rhombopora yanbianensis	Liu	1980	Early Permian	China
Rhombopora yui	Yang	1950	Devonian	China
Rhombopora zogangensis	Lu	1982	Early Carboniferous	China
