= Neoeridotrypella =

Scientific classification
- Kingdom: Animalia
- Phylum: Bryozoa
- Class: Stenolaemata
- Order: †Trepostomida
- Family: †Eridotrypellidae
- Genus: †Neoeridotrypella

Extinct genus of bryozoans

Neoeridotrypella is an extinct genus of bryozoan of the family Eridotrypellidae, known from the Permian period. Its colonies were typically branching or tree-shaped though sometimes encrusting or massive, and the walls of its zooecial chambers were thicker within the exozone and full of tiny tubules.

== Species ==
- Neoeridotrypella pulchra (Morozova, 1970) was the first Neoeridotrypella species described.
- Neoeridotrypella schilti (1997)
- Neoeridotrypella missionensis (2000) formed only encrusting colonies, which sometimes encrusted upon other bryozoans.
