= Cystodictyonidae =

Cystodictyonidae Temporal range: 388.1–61.7 Ma

Scientific classification
- Kingdom: Animalia
- Phylum: Bryozoa
- Class: Stenolaemata
- Order: †Cystoporida
- Suborder: †Hexagonellina
- Family: †Cystodictyonidae; Ulrich, 1884

Extinct family of bryozoans

Cystodictyonidae is an extinct family of bryozoans within the order Cystoporida. Members of this family have been known to live from the Ordovician to the Paleogene period.

== Genera ==
- †Acrogenia Hall, 1883
- †Cystodictya Ulrich, 1882
- †Dichotrypa Ulrich in Miller, 1889
- †Filiramoporina Fry & Cuffey, 1976
- †Lophoclema Morozova, 1955
- †Mongolodictya Gorjunova, 1988
- †Ptilocella Simpson, 1897
- †Semiopora Hall, 1883
- †Stictocella Simpson, 1897
- †Sulcoretepora d'Orbigny, 1849
- †Taeniopora Nicholson, 1874
- †Thamnotrypa Hall & Simpson, 1887
- †Wysejacksonella Ernst & Gorgij, 2013
