= Rhinoporidae =

Rhinoporidae Temporal range: 455.8–383.7 Ma

Scientific classification
- Kingdom: Animalia
- Phylum: Bryozoa
- Class: Stenolaemata
- Order: †Cystoporida
- Suborder: †Fistuliporina
- Family: †Rhinoporidae; Miller, 1889

Extinct family of bryozoans

Rhinoporidae is an extinct family of bryozoans within the order Cystoporida. There are currently 3 genera assigned to the family. Members of this family have lived from the Ordovician to the Devonian.

== Genera ==
- †Lichenalia Hall, 1851
- †Rhinopora Hall, 1851
- †Rhinoporella Gorjunova, 1992
