= Polyteichus =

Scientific classification
- Kingdom: Animalia
- Phylum: Bryozoa
- Class: Stenolaemata
- Order: †Trepostomatida
- Genus: †Polyteichus; Pocta in Barrande, 1902

Extinct genus of moss animals

Polyteichus is a genus of bryozoans of the order Trepostomatida. They are spherical, semi-spherical or disc shaped, with 3 or 4 radiating lobes, being 2–5 cm in diameter. The zooecia are shaped as wide prisms.

Representatives of this genus have been found in the Upper Ordovician of the Czech Republic.
