= Kukersella =

Scientific classification
- Kingdom: Animalia
- Phylum: Bryozoa
- Class: Stenolaemata
- Order: Cyclostomatida
- Family: †Crownoporidae
- Genus: †Kukersella; Toots, 1952

Species
- See text

Synonyms
- Crownopora Ross, 1967

Extinct genus of bryozoans

Kukersella is an extinct genus of bryozoan of the family Crownoporidae, known from the Ordovician period. Its colonies consist of cylindrical branches growing from an encrusting base.

== Species ==
- †Kukersella borealis (Bassler, 1911)
- †Kukersella erratica Dzik, 1981
