= Zigzagopora =

Scientific classification
- Kingdom: Animalia
- Phylum: Bryozoa
- Class: Stenolaemata
- Order: Cyclostomatida
- Family: Sagenellidae
- Genus: †Zigzagopora; Wilson & Taylor, 2016
- Species: †Z. wigleyensis

Binomial name
- †Zigzagopora wigleyensis Wilson & Taylor, 2016

Extinct genus of bryozoan

Zigzagopora is an extinct genus of bryozoans thought to belong to the family Sagenellidae, containing one species, Zigzagopora wigleyensis. It is distinctive because of its "zig-zag" appearance. The "fortuitous" species name references the Wigley Quarry in Oklahoma where it was found.
