= Characodoma =

Scientific classification
- Kingdom: Animalia
- Phylum: Bryozoa
- Class: Gymnolaemata
- Order: Cheilostomatida
- Family: Cleidochasmatidae
- Genus: Characodoma; Maplestone, 1900

Type species
- Characodoma halli Maplestone, 1900

Species
- Several, including: Characodoma elegans (Lu, 1991)

Synonyms
- Cleidochasma Harmer, 1957

Genus of moss animals

Characodoma is a genus of bryozoans. Some species are known in the fossil record.

== See also ==
- List of prehistoric bryozoan genera
