= Fenestrapora =

Scientific classification
- Kingdom: Animalia
- Phylum: Bryozoa
- Class: Stenolaemata
- Order: †Fenestrida
- Family: †Semicosciniidae
- Genus: †Fenestrapora; Hall, 1885

Genus of bryozoan

Fenestrapora is an extinct genus of bryozoans of the family Semicosciniidae that lived during the Devonian period. Its colonies have a net-like structure, shaped into a flaring funnel. It is distinct from most other fenestrate bryozoans due to its aviculomorphs, structures that are thought to have had the function of cleaning or defense.
