= Coscinium (bryozoan) =

Coscinium Temporal range: 466.0–279.5 Ma

Scientific classification
- Kingdom: Animalia
- Phylum: Bryozoa
- Class: Stenolaemata
- Order: †Cystoporida
- Family: †Hexagonellidae
- Genus: †Coscinium; Keyserling, 1846

Species
- †Coscinium cyclops (type); †Coscinium elegans; †Coscinium praenuntium; †Coscinium stenops

Extinct genus of bryozoans

Coscinium is an extinct genus of prehistoric bryozoans in the family Hexagonellidae. The species C. elegans is from the Paleozoic rocks of the western states and territories.
