= Palaeostomata =

Scientific classification
- Domain: Eukaryota
- Kingdom: Animalia
- Phylum: Bryozoa
- Class: Stenolaemata
- Superorder: †Palaeostomata; Ma, Buttler & Taylor, 2014

Extinct superorder of bryozoans

Palaeostomata is a superorder of extinct stenolaemate bryozoans, including all extinct orders within Stenolaemata and excluding the order Cyclostomata, which is the only extant stenolaemate order. Palaeostomates are sometimes called "stony bryozoans" because they are heavily calcified, making them ideal candidates for fossilization. They are distinct from cyclostomes because they lack calcified exterior walls above the basal lamina and because their zooecial tubes are transected by calcitic partitions, such as diaphragms (which serve as the "floor" for the individual zooids that live in the zooecial tubes).
