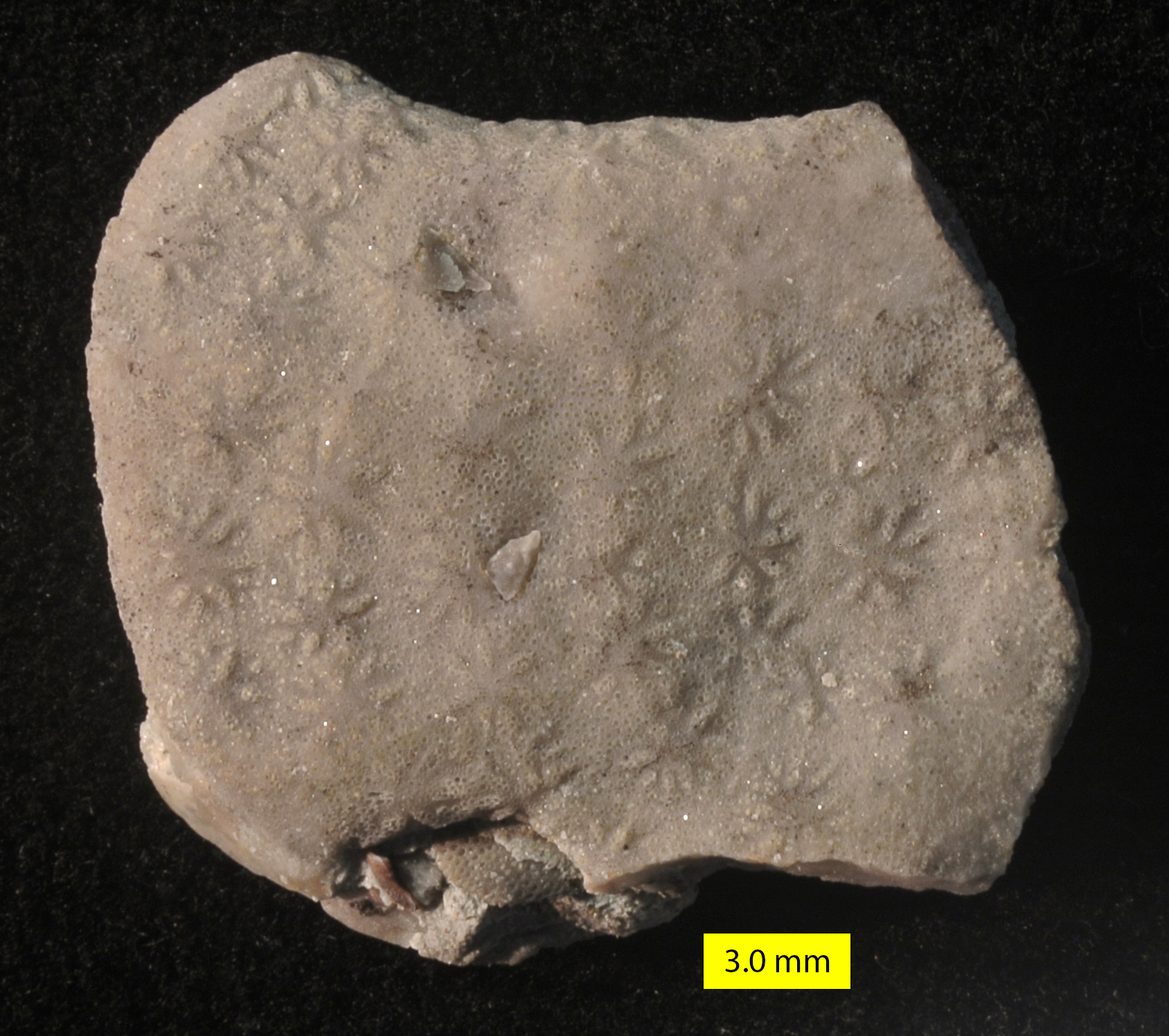
- Constellaria polystomella from the Liberty Formation, Caesar Creek Lake, Ohio.

Scientific classification
- Kingdom: Animalia
- Phylum: Bryozoa
- Class: Stenolaemata
- Order: †Cystoporida
- Family: †Constellariidae
- Genus: †Constellaria; Dana, 1846

Type species
- Constellaria constellata Dana, 1849

= Constellaria =

Constellaria Temporal range: Ordovician

Extinct genus of moss animals

Constellaria is an extinct genus of bryozoan from the Middle Ordovician to Early Silurian (510-410 million years ago) from North America, Asia and Europe. These branching coral-like bryozoans formed bushy colonies 10–15 mm (0.375-0.5 inches) across on the seabed. The fairly thick branches were erect, often compressed in one direction, and covered with distinctive tiny, star-shaped mounds called maculae or monticules (regularly shaped hummocks). Feeding zoids were located along the rays of the stars. The maculae probably formed "chimneys" for the expulsion of exhalant feeding currents from the surface of a colony, after water had been filtered to obtain food for the organisms.

== Discovery ==
Constellaria was the first fossil bryozoan genus to be described. It was initially discovered by naturalist J.W. Van Cleve, but Cleve's work had to be finished by James Dwight Dana.

== Species ==
C. antheloidea (Hall): Late Ordovician, Cincinnati Group, United States of America
