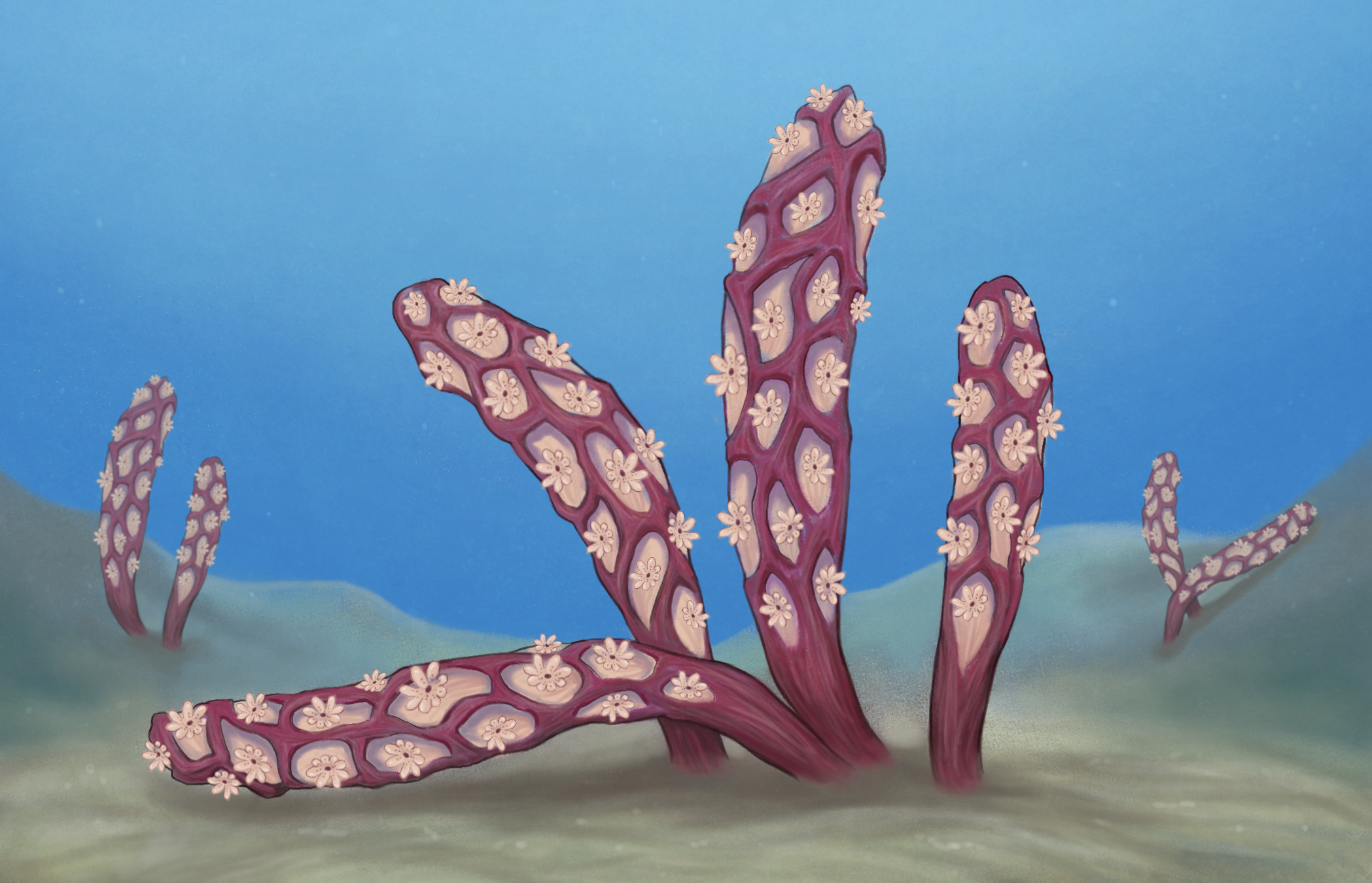
- Artist's restoration

Scientific classification
- Kingdom: Animalia
- Phylum: incertae sedis
- Genus: †Pywackia
- Species: †P. baileyi

Binomial name
- †Pywackia baileyi Landing in Landing et al., 2010

= Pywackia =

Pywackia Temporal range: Late Cambrian

Extinct genus of aquatic animals

Pywackia is a contentious Cambrian fossil that has been interpreted as the earliest (total group) bryozoan, and the only representative of that phylum in the Cambrian period. Its bryozoan credentials have been called into question, but the octocoral alternative is equally unconvincing, and there are reasons to suggest a position in the Stenolaemata stem lineage. Finally, the skeletal microstructure is consistent with a cnidarian affinity, but insufficient to support a close affinity with any modern subgroup.
