= Reptomulticava =

Reptomulticava Temporal range: early Cretaceous–Miocene

Scientific classification
- Kingdom: Animalia
- Phylum: Bryozoa
- Class: Stenolaemata
- Order: Cyclostomatida
- Genus: †Reptomulticava d'Orbigny

Species
- R. alhamensis R. cepularis R. collis R. mammilla R. micropora R. parviporosa R. texana

Extinct genus of bryozoa

Reptomulticava is an extinct genus of bryozoa belonging to the order Cyclostomatida. Specimens have been reported from France, Spain, and in the southern Western Interior of North America.
