= Diploclema =

Scientific classification
- Kingdom: Animalia
- Phylum: Bryozoa
- Class: Stenolaemata
- Order: Cyclostomatida
- Family: †Diploclemidae; Gorjunova, 1992
- Genus: †Diploclema; Ulrich, 1889

Extinct genus of bryozoans

Diploclema is an extinct genus of bryozoan belonging to the monotypic family Dipoclemidae, found from the Middle Ordovician to the Middle Silurian. It has pear-shaped autozooecia which grow in a biradial pattern, and its colonies have a dichotomously branching shape. Its laminated exterior wall possesses a prismatic structure, which is unique among the cyclostome bryozoans.
