= Mirifenestella =

Scientific classification
- Kingdom: Animalia
- Phylum: Bryozoa
- Class: Stenolaemata
- Order: †Fenestrida
- Family: †Fenestraporidae
- Genus: †Mirifenestella; Morozova, 1974

Extinct species of bryozoan

Mirifenestella is an extinct genus of bryozoans from the Devonian period, belonging to the order Fenestrida. Like some other fenestrate bryozoans, it produced a skeletal superstructure that protected the colony. It also developed specialized zooids known as "aviculomorphs" which occurred in pairs and may have been either for cleaning or defense purposes.
