= Acanthoceramoporella =

Scientific classification
- Kingdom: Animalia
- Phylum: Bryozoa
- Class: Stenolaemata
- Order: †Cystoporida
- Family: †Acanthoceramoporellidae
- Genus: †Acanthoceramoporella; Utgaard, 1968

Extinct genus of cystoporate bryozoans

Acanthoceramoporella is an extinct genus of cystoporate bryozoans from the Ordovician period.
