= Quadrisemicoscinium =

Quadrisemicoscinium Temporal range: Emsian–Eifelian

Scientific classification
- Kingdom: Animalia
- Phylum: Bryozoa
- Class: Stenolaemata
- Order: †Fenestrida
- Family: †Semicosciniidae
- Genus: †Quadrisemicoscinium; Plamenskaya, 1991

Extinct genus of bryozoans

Quadrisemicoscinium is an extinct genus of fenestrate bryozoan, known from the Early Devonian period, of the family Semicosciniidae. It formed net-like colonies of relatively thick branches with two rows of autozooids per branch, supported by a vesicular skeleton.

== Species ==
Three species are recognized.

- †Quadrisemicoscinium alticarinatum (Troitzkaia, 1968)
- †Quadrisemicoscinium fungiforme Plamenskaya, 1991
- †Quadrisemicoscinium intermedium (Nekhoroshev, 1926)
