= Marcusodictyon =

Marcusodictyon Temporal range: late Cambrian–Early Ordovician

Scientific classification
- Kingdom: Animalia
- Phylum: incertae sedis
- Genus: Marcusodictyon† Bassler, 1953

Species
- See text

Genus of fossils

Marcusodictyon is a genus of problematic fossils. It has been considered the oldest bryozoan in several publications. Taylor (1984) revised the systematics of the genus and removed it from Bryozoa. The fossil constitutes a phosphatic network of low ridges that enclose polygons about 0.3–1.2 mm wide that are generally 6-sided but can be 4-, 5- or 7-sided. The internal microstructure of Marcusodictyon is composed of laminae parallel to external surfaces of ridges (Taylor 1984). Marcusodictyon occurs on late Cambrian and Tremadocian lingulate brachiopods of Baltica (Vinn 2015).
