= Cleidochasmatidae =

Scientific classification
- Kingdom: Animalia
- Phylum: Bryozoa
- Class: Gymnolaemata
- Order: Cheilostomatida
- Family: Cleidochasmatidae

Family of bryozoans

Cleidochasmatidae is a family of bryozoans belonging to the order Cheilostomatida.

Genera:

- Anchicleidochasma Soule, Soule & Chaney, 1991
- Calyptooecia Winston, 1984
- Characodoma Maplestone, 1900
- Cleidochasmidra Ünsal & d'Hondt, 1979
- Fedorella Silén, 1947
- Gemelliporina Bassler, 1936
- Yrbozoon Gordon, 1989
