= Petraliella =

Scientific classification
- Kingdom: Animalia
- Phylum: Bryozoa
- Class: Gymnolaemata
- Order: Cheilostomatida
- Family: Petraliidae
- Genus: Petraliella; Canu & Bassler, 1927

Genus of bryozoans

Petraliella is a genus of bryozoans belonging to the family Petraliidae.

The genus has almost cosmopolitan distribution.

Species:

- Petraliella africana (Cook, 1967)
- Petraliella asanoi Kataoka, 1957
- Petraliella bisinuata (Smitt, 1873)
- Petraliella buski Stach, 1936
- Petraliella concinna (Hincks, 1891)
- Petraliella crassocirca (Canu & Bassler, 1929)
- Petraliella denticulata Canu & Bassler, 1935
- Petraliella dentilabris (Ortmann, 1892)
- Petraliella dorsiporosa (Busk, 1884)
- Petraliella elongata Canu & Bassler, 1929
- Petraliella globulata Chae, Kil & Seo, 2016
- Petraliella intermediata Gordon, 1984
- Petraliella magna (d'Orbigny, 1852)
- Petraliella marginata Canu & Bassler, 1928
- Petraliella megafera Guha & Gopikrishna, 2007
- Petraliella pirikaensis (Hayami, 1975)
- Petraliella ramifica Kataoka, 1961
- Petraliella serratilabrosa (Harmer, 1957)
- Petraliella snelliusi (d'Hondt, 1983)
- Petraliella tractifera Canu & Bassler, 1935
- Petraliella umbonata Okada & Mawatari, 1937
