= Gemelliporina =

Scientific classification
- Kingdom: Animalia
- Phylum: Bryozoa
- Class: Gymnolaemata
- Order: Cheilostomatida
- Family: Cleidochasmatidae
- Genus: Gemelliporina; Bassler, 1936

Genus of bryozoans

Gemelliporina is a genus of bryozoans belonging to the family Cleidochasmatidae.

The species of this genus are found in North and Central America.

Species:

- Gemelliporina glabra (Smitt, 1873)
- Gemelliporina hastata Winston & Woollacott, 2009
- Gemelliporina punctata (Canu & Bassler, 1919)
