= Coscinopleura =

Coscinopleura Temporal range: 66.043–61.7 Ma

Scientific classification
- Kingdom: Animalia
- Phylum: Bryozoa
- Class: Gymnolaemata
- Order: Cheilostomatida
- Family: †Coscinopleuridae
- Genus: †Coscinopleura; Marsson, 1887

Species
- Coscinpleura angusta; Coscinopleura elegans

Extinct genus of moss animals

Coscinopleura is an extinct genus of prehistoric bryozoans in the family Coscinopleuridae. Species are from the Paleocene of Sweden and New Jersey, United States. C. elegans and C. angusta are from the Senonian and Danian of Denmark.
