= Karl Friedrich von Hagenow =

Pomeranian aristocrat (1797–1865)

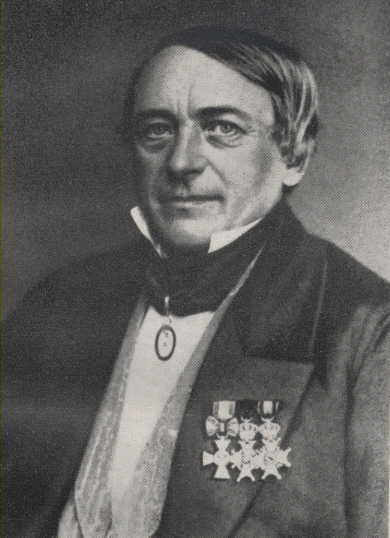

Karl Friedrich von Hagenow (19 January 1797 – 18 October 1865) was a Pomeranian aristocrat, archaeologist, paleontologist, geologist, naturalist, inventor, and antiquarian. He studied megalithic graves in the West Pomeranian region as well its birdlife. He also collected and documented chalk fossils in Rügen, amassing nearly 10000 fossils by the 1830s.

== Life and work ==
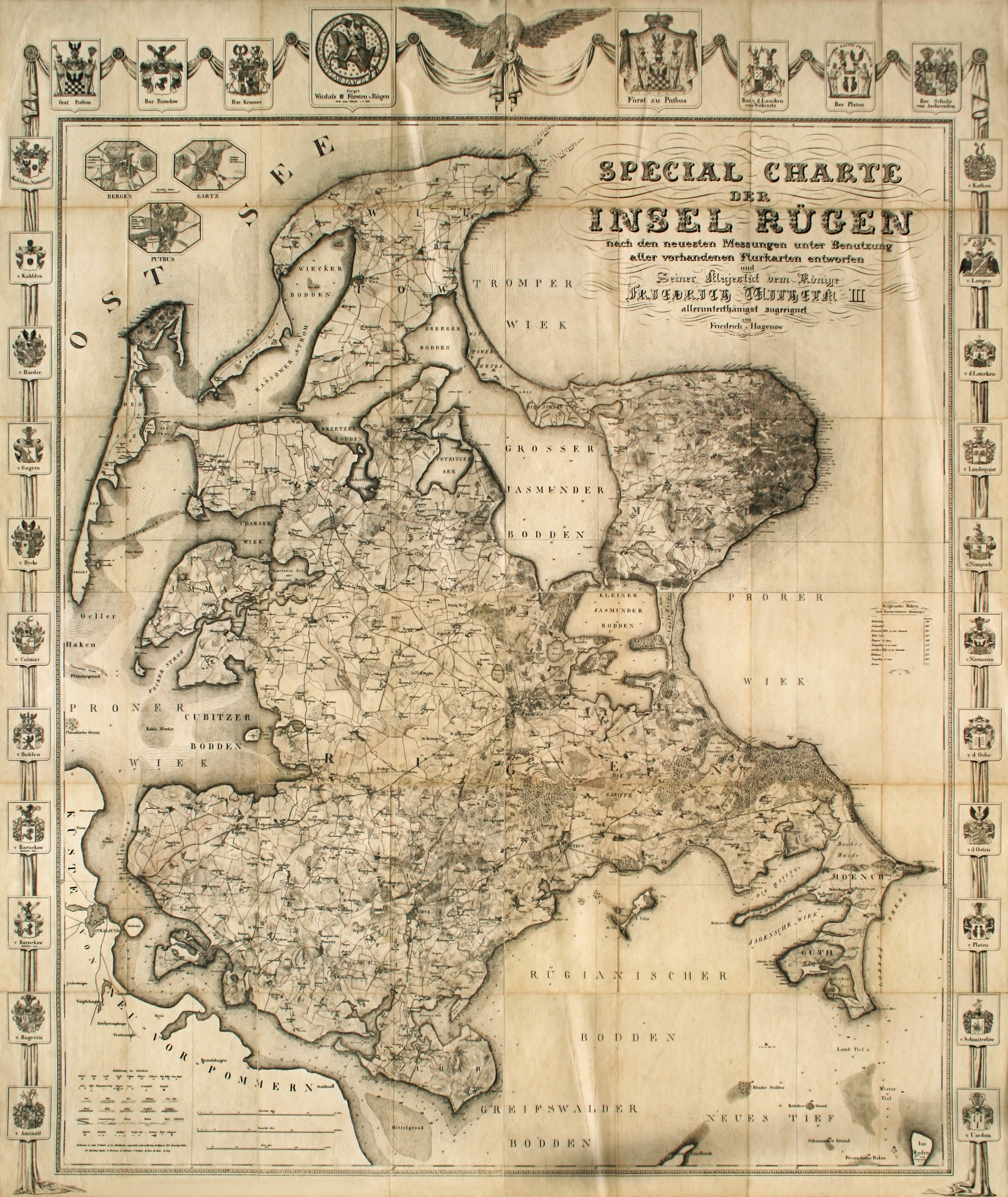
Map of Rügen by Hagenow, 1829

Hagenow was born in Langenfelde, Vorpommern, the eldest of nine children born in the manor of Friedrich Christoph Karl Hagenow and Marie Mentz. They were made nobility in 1802. The young Hagenow studied natural sciences at the University of Greifswald where he was influenced by Gustav Salomon Tillberg. After his father died, his mother married Tillberg. Hagenow initially studied agriculture and then went to Dargun, Mecklenburg where he worked as an adjunct in the judicial office. He worked as a military volunteer in 1817–18 with the Garde-Schützen-Bataillon in Berlin but also attended lectures in the Friedrich-Wilhelms-Universität. He moved to Rügen in 1818 to the Poggendorf Estate near Schaprode and married a relative, Elisabeth Karoline Hennings, the next year. They would have five children. He began to study West Pomeranian megalithic burials and also took an interest in the birds of the region. He found nearly 239 graves in the region. In 1830 he discovered a skeleton in a marl pit which drew a lot of attention. He received an honorary doctorate in 1830 from the University of Greifswald. In 1832 he setup Germany's first factory to produce chalk slurry (whiting or calcium carbonate) with equipment that he designed himself. He also gave lectures in applied mathematics at the Agricultural Academy in Eldena between 1835 and 1838. After the death of his mother in 1844 he inherited Nielitz estate. He began to use trigonometrical survey techniques to produce a map of Pomerania and Rügen in 1839. He sold off his factory in 1850 and spent all his time on scientific research. In 1851 he published a work on the Bryozoans of Mastricht cretaceous which he examined in the company of Charles Lyell, making use of an instrument he designed to draw fossils accurately. He called this camera lucida like instrument the dicatopter and patented it in 1851. He presented the dicatopter at the Vienna meeting of the Academy of Sciences in 1854. Failing eyesight led to a reduction in his paleontology work and he shifted to archaeology and history. He studied heraldry and began to reproduce old seals.

Hagenow's collection of antiquities was purchased after his death for 1550 thalers and are now held in the Stralsund Museum. Some of his fossils were in the state museum in Stettin but a lot was destroyed in World War II. From his manuscript notes, some of the fossils have been identified as that of Mosasaurs.
