= Ceramoporidae =

Scientific classification
- Kingdom: Animalia
- Phylum: Bryozoa
- Class: Stenolaemata
- Order: †Cystoporida
- Suborder: †Ceramoporina
- Family: †Ceramoporidae; Ulrich, 1882

Extinct family of moss animals

Ceramoporidae is a family of bryozoans placed in the Cystoporida. Species are from the Paleozoic.
