= Cryptostomida =

Cryptostomida Temporal range: Ordovician–Permian

Scientific classification
- Kingdom: Animalia
- Phylum: Bryozoa
- Class: Stenolaemata
- Order: †Cryptostomida; Vine, 1884

Suborders
- Goldfussitrypina; Ptilodictyina; Rhabdomesina; Streblotrypina; Timanodictyina

Synonyms
- Cryptostomata

Extinct order of moss animals

Cryptostomida is an order of fossil bryozoans that lived from the Ordovician to the Permian.
