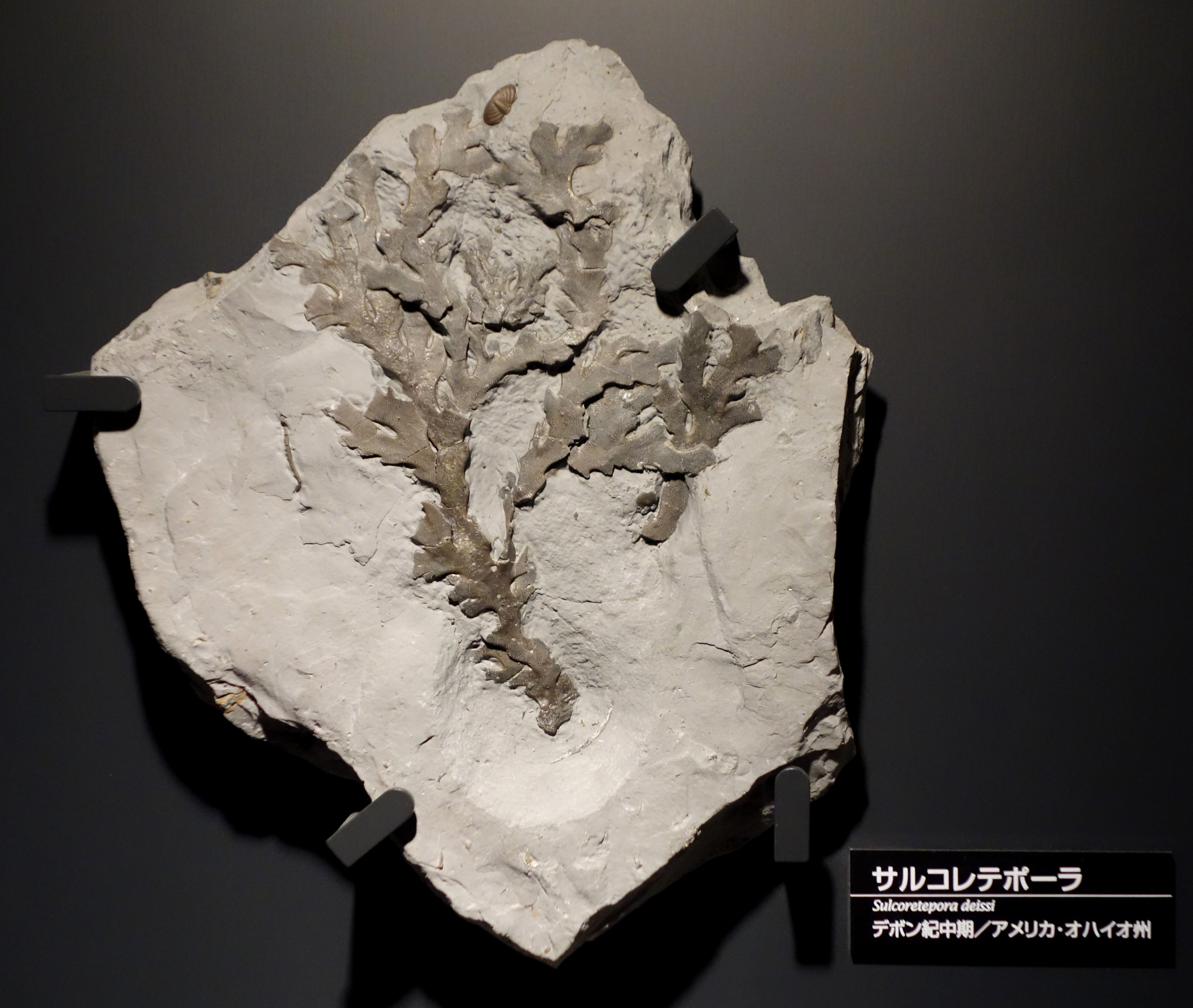
- Sulcoretepora deissi

Scientific classification
- Kingdom: Animalia
- Phylum: Bryozoa
- Class: Stenolaemata
- Order: †Cystoporida; Astrova, 1964

Synonyms
- Cystoporata

= Cystoporida =

Extinct order of moss animals

Cystoporida, also known as Cystoporata or cystoporates, are an extinct order of Paleozoic bryozoans in the class Stenolaemata. Their fossils are found from Ordovician to Triassic strata.

All cystoporatan bryozoan genera (around 50 or so) have a "cystopore", a chamber-like supporting structure, separated from each other by transverse septa, situated between the characteristically elongated zooecia of each individual colony.

== Families ==
- Acanthoceramoporellidae (Ordovician)
- Actinotrypidae (Carboniferous-Permian)
- Anolotichiidae (Ordovician)
- Botrylloporidae (Ordovician-Devonian)
- Ceramoporidae (Ordovician-Devonian)
- Constellariidae (Ordovician-Silurian)
- Cystodictyonidae (Devonian-Permian)
- Etherellidae (Permian)
- Evactinoporidae (Carboniferous-Permian)
- Fistuliporidae (Ordovician-Permian)
- Goniocladiidae (Devonian-Permian)
- Hexagonellidae (Ordovician-Permian)
- Revalotrypidae (Ordovician)
- Rhinoporidae (Ordovician-Devonian)
- Xenotrypidae (Ordovician-Silurian)
