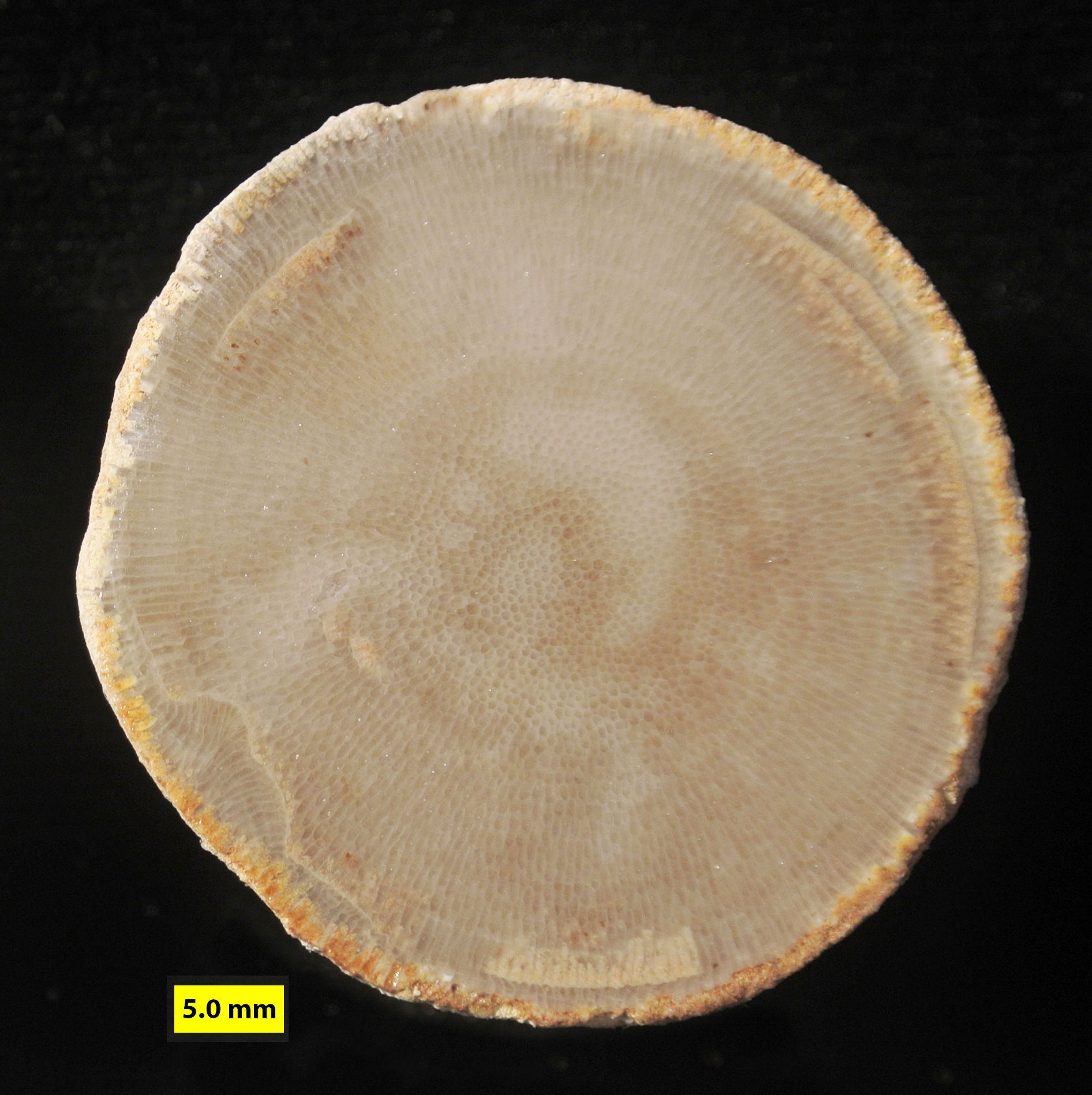
- Esthoniopora, a trepostome from the Ordovician of Estonia (cross-section).

Scientific classification
- Kingdom: Animalia
- Phylum: Bryozoa
- Class: Stenolaemata
- Order: †Trepostomatida; Ulrich 1882

Suborders
- Amplexoporina; Halloporina

Synonyms
- Trepostomata; Trepostomida

= Trepostomatida =

Trepostomatida Temporal range: Early Ordovician–Triassic

Extinct order of moss animals

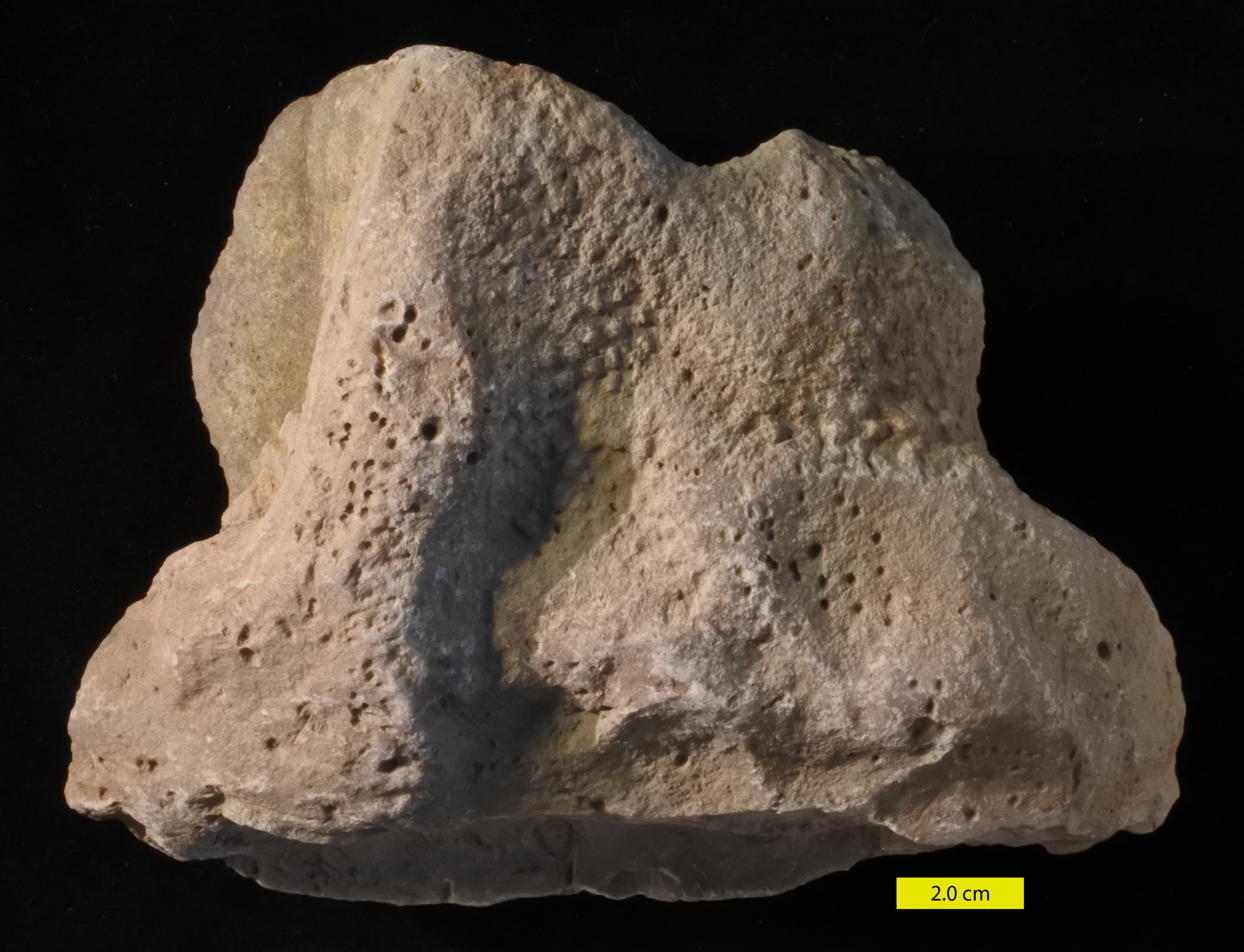
Trepostome bryozoan with bioerosion; Bellevue Formation, Upper Ordovician (Katian), northern Kentucky.

Trepostomatida (the trepostomates or trepostomes) is an extinct order of bryozoans in the class Stenolaemata. Trepostome bryozoans possessed mineralized calcitic skeletons and are frequently fossilized; some of the largest known fossilized bryozoan colonies are branching trepostomes and massive dome-shaped trepostomes. Trepostomes did not have many specialized zooecia beyond ordinary feeding autozooecia. The two main known heteromorphs are exilazooecia and mesozooecia, which have the purpose of maintaining regular spacing between autozooecia.
