= Stenolaemata =

Stenolaemata Temporal range: Cambrian Stage 3–Recent

Scientific classification
- Kingdom: Animalia
- Phylum: Bryozoa
- Class: Stenolaemata; Borg, 1926

Orders
- See text

Class of moss animals

Stenolaemata are a class of exclusively marine bryozoans. Stenolaemates originated and diversified since the early Cambrian. All extant (living) species are in the order Cyclostomatida, the third-largest order of living bryozoans.

These animals are stationary suspension feeders that live on the ocean floor. They formed colonies with robust, calcified exoskeletons, allowing for a high potential for fossil preservation. The individual zooids in the colony may be tubular, conical, or sac-shaped. Each individual, or zooid, may extend from the colony at an angle, extending its tentacles to feed. The fossil genus Batostoma in the order Trepostomatida existed in monticular colonies.

Stenolaemates were the predominant bryozoan group during the Paleozoic, when many extinct orders proliferated within the class. Some grew as lacy or fan-like colonies that became important reef builders, and in some regions form an abundant component of limestones. The extinct Palaeozoic stenolaemate orders are placed in the superorder Palaeostomata. Their numbers were greatly reduced during the terminal Permian extinction event, and most stenolaemates were extinct by the start of the Jurassic.

However, the basal and previously rare stenolaemate order Cyclostomatida diversified in the Jurassic and became the most abundant group of bryozoans in the late Mesozoic. Cyclostomatida is no longer the most speciose bryozoan group, as the order experienced high rates of extinction during the end-Cretaceous mass extinction, while ctenostome and cheilostome bryozoans in the class Gymnolaemata diversified around the same time. Nevertheless, cyclostomates are still major components of modern marine ecosystems.

Extant and extinct orders in this class include:

- Cyclostomatida/Cyclostomata (Ordovician-present)
- Cryptostomida/Cryptostomata † (Ordovician-Triassic)
- Cystoporida/Cystoporata † (Ordovician-Triassic)
- Esthonioporata † (Ordovician-Devonian)
- Fenestrida/Fenestrata † (Ordovician-Permian)
- Timanodictyina † (Devonian-Permian, may be a suborder of Cryptostomida)
- Trepostomatida/Trepostomata † (Ordovician-Triassic)
