= List of Cyclostomatida families =

Cyclostomatida or Cyclostomata, are an order of stenolaemate bryozoans consisting of 7+ suborders, 59+ families, 373+ genera, 666+ species.

- Suborder Articulina (2+ families, 9+ genera, 10+ species)
  - Family Crisiidae (8+ genera, 9+ species)
  - Family Crisuliporidae (1+ genera, 1+ species)
- Suborder Paleotubuliporina (4+ families, 4+ genera, 47+ species)
  - Family Corynotrypidae (4+ genera, 27+ species)
  - Family Sagenellidae (2+ genera, 2+ species)
  - Family Crownoporidae (7+ genera, 17+ species)
  - Family Kukersellidae (1+ genera, 1+ species)
- Suborder Tubuliporina (22 families, 175+ genera, 384+ species)
  - Family Stomatoporidae (8+ genera, 16+ species)
  - Family Cinctiporidae (4+ genera, 8+ species)
  - Family Oncousoeciidae (5+ genera, 47+ species)
  - Family Oncousoeciidae (22+ genera, 69+ species)
  - Family Tubuliporidae (7+ genera, 10+ species)
  - Family Diploclemidae (1+ Genus 1+ species)
  - Family Multiparsidae (1+ genera, 1+ species)
  - Family Diploclemidae (40+ genera, 74+ species)
  - Family Celluliporidae (8+ genera, 8+ species)
  - Family Plagioeciidae (38+ genera, 64+ species)
  - Family Eleidae (8+ genera, 8+ species)
  - Family terviidae (4+ genera, 6+ species)
  - Family Spiroporidae (1+ Genus, 1+ species)
  - Family Diastoporidae (4+ genera, 7+ species)
  - Family Annectocymidae (1+ genera, 5+ species)
  - Family Bereniceidae (1+ genera, 1+ species)
  - Family Filisparsidae (3+ genera, 3+ species)
  - Family Mecynoeciidae (1+ genera, 1+ species)
  - Family Diaperoeciidae (3+ genera, 3+ species)
  - Family Entalophoridae (11+ genera, 11+ species)
  - Family Pustuloporidae (3+ genera, 3+ species)
- Suborder Fascilculina (8+ families, 34+ genera, 55+ species)
  - Family Frondiporidae (9+ genera, 11+ species)
  - Family Fasciculiporidae (1+ genera, 1+ species)
  - Family Fascigeridae (1+ genera, 1+ species)
  - Family Theonoidae (14+ genera, 23+ species)
  - Family Actinoporidae (1+ genera, 9+ species)
  - Family Siphoniotyphlidae (2+ genera, 2+ species)
  - Family Hastingsiidae (1+ genera, 3+ species)
  - Family Semiceidae (5+ genera, 5+ species)
- Suborder Cancellata (11+ families, 89+ genera, 99+ species)
  - Family Horneridae (5+ genera, 8+ species)
  - Family Stigmatoechidae (1+ genera, 1+ species)
  - Family Stegohorneridae (1+ genera, 1+ species)
  - Family Petaloporidae (13+ genera, 13+ species)
  - Family Calvetiidae (1+ genera, 1+ species)
  - Family Crisinidae (15+ genera, 18+ species)
  - Family Crassodiscoporidae (1+ genera, 1+ species)
  - Family Ctyididae (27+ genera, 28+ species)
  - Family Pseudidmoneidae (1+ genera, 1+ species)
  - Family Radioporidae (23+ genera, 26+ species)
  - Family Canaliporidae (1+ genera, 1+ species)
- Suborder Cerioporina (10+ families, 60+ genera, 69+ species)
  - Family Cerioporidae (40+ genera, 47+ species)
  - Family Heteroporidae (2+ genera, 2+ species)
  - Family Leiosoeciidae (4+ genera, 4+ species)
  - Family Densiporidae (1+ genera, 1+ species)
  - Family Tretocycloeciidae (1+ genera, 1+ species)
  - Family Cavidae (3+ genera, 5+ species)
  - Family Corymboporidae (4+ genera, 4+ species)
  - Family Gungellidae (1+ genera, 1+ species)
  - Family Pseudocerioporidae (1+ genera, 1+ species)
- Suborder Rectangulata (2+ families, 2+ genera, 2+ species)
  - Family Lichenoporidae (1+ genera, 1+ species)
  - Family Disporellidae (1+ genera, 1+ species)
