= List of Bryozoa of Ireland =

There are 100 species of Bryozoa (moss animals) recorded in Ireland.

== Class Gymnolaemata ==
=== Order Cheilostomata ===
==== Family Adeonidae ====
- Reptadeonella violacea

==== Family Aeteidae ====
- Aetea anguina
- Aetea truncata

==== Family Bitectiporidae ====
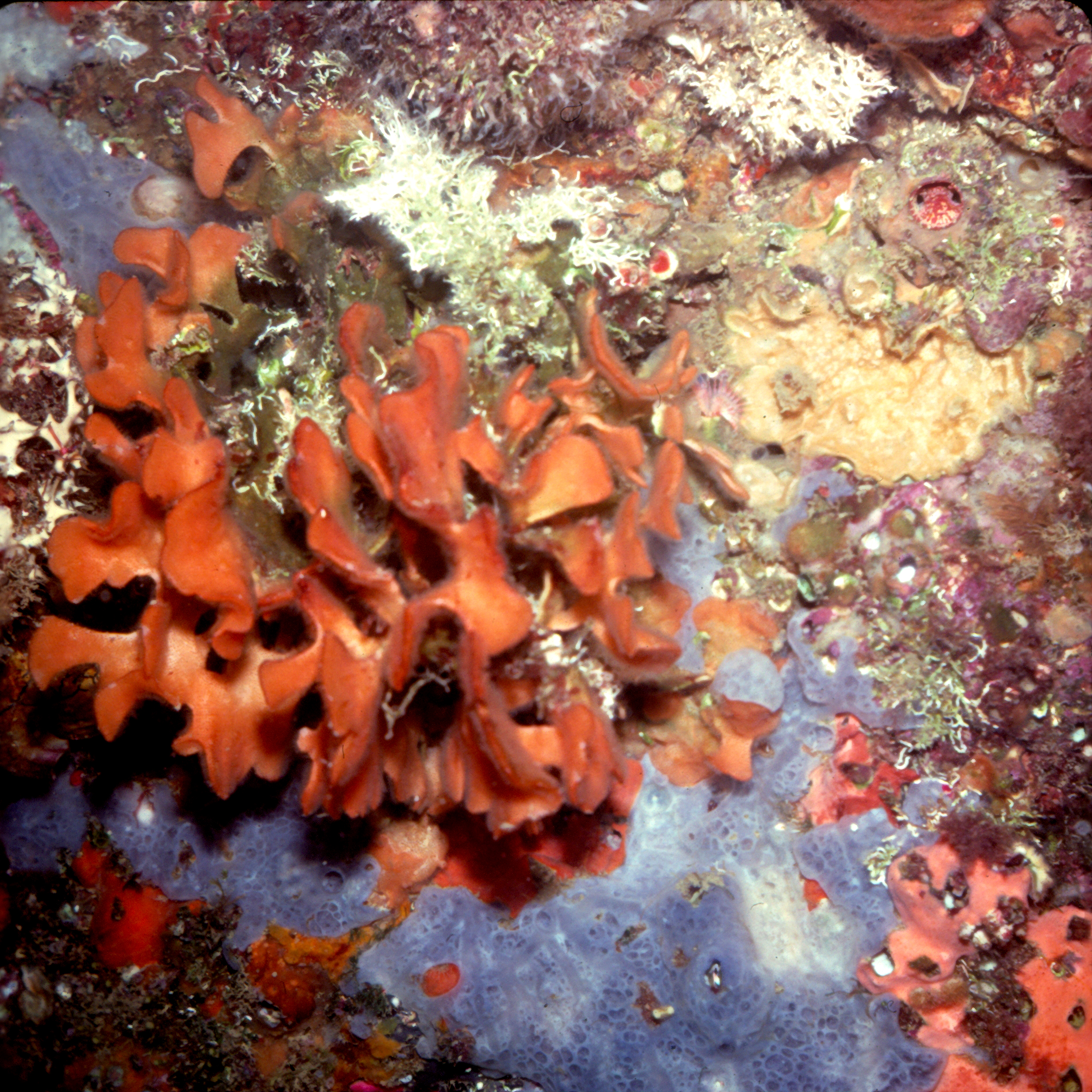
Pentapora fascialis

- Pentapora fascialis
- Schizomavella linearis
- Schizomavella sarniensis

==== Family Bryocryptellidae ====
- Palmiskenea skenei
- Porella compressa

==== Family Bugulidae ====
- Bicellariella ciliata
- Bugula angustiloba
- Bugula avicularia
- Bugula calathus
- Bugula fulva
- Bugula neritina
- Bugula plumosa
- Bugula purpurotincta
- Bugula stolonifera
- Bugula turbinata

==== Family Candidae ====
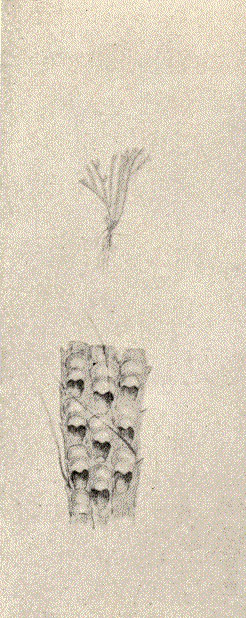
Caberea ellisii

- Caberea boryi
- Caberea ellisii
- Scrupocellaria reptans
- Scrupocellaria scrupea
- Scrupocellaria scruposa

==== Family Calloporidae ====
- Callopora lineata
- Callopora rylandi
- Cauloramphus spiniferum

==== Family Cellariidae ====
- Cellaria fistulosa
- Cellaria salicornioides
- Cellaria sinuosa

==== Family Celleporidae ====
- Buskea dichotoma
- Buskea quincuncialis
- Cellepora pumicosa
- Celleporina caliciformis
- Omalosecosa ramulosa
- Turbicellepora avicularis

==== Family Cribrilinidae ====
- Cribrilina cryptooecium

==== Family Cryptosulidae ====
- Cryptosula pallasiana

==== Family Diastoporidae ====
- Diplosolen obelia

==== Family Electridae ====
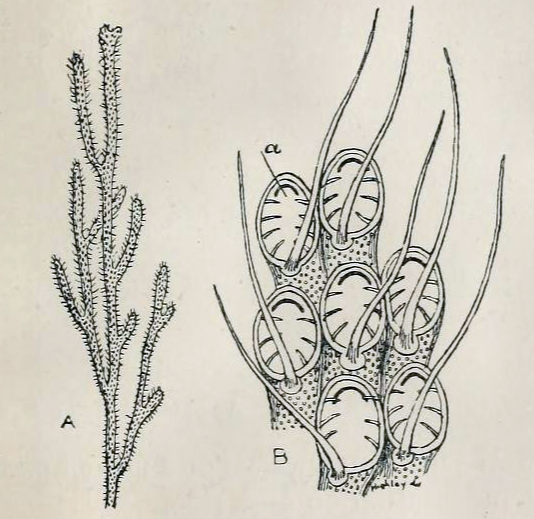
Electra pilosa

- Electra pilosa

==== Family Escharellidae ====
various species

==== Family Escharinidae ====
- Phaeostachys spinifera

==== Family Eucrateidae ====
- Eucratea loricata

==== Family Exochellidae ====
- Escharoides coccinea

==== Family Flustridae ====
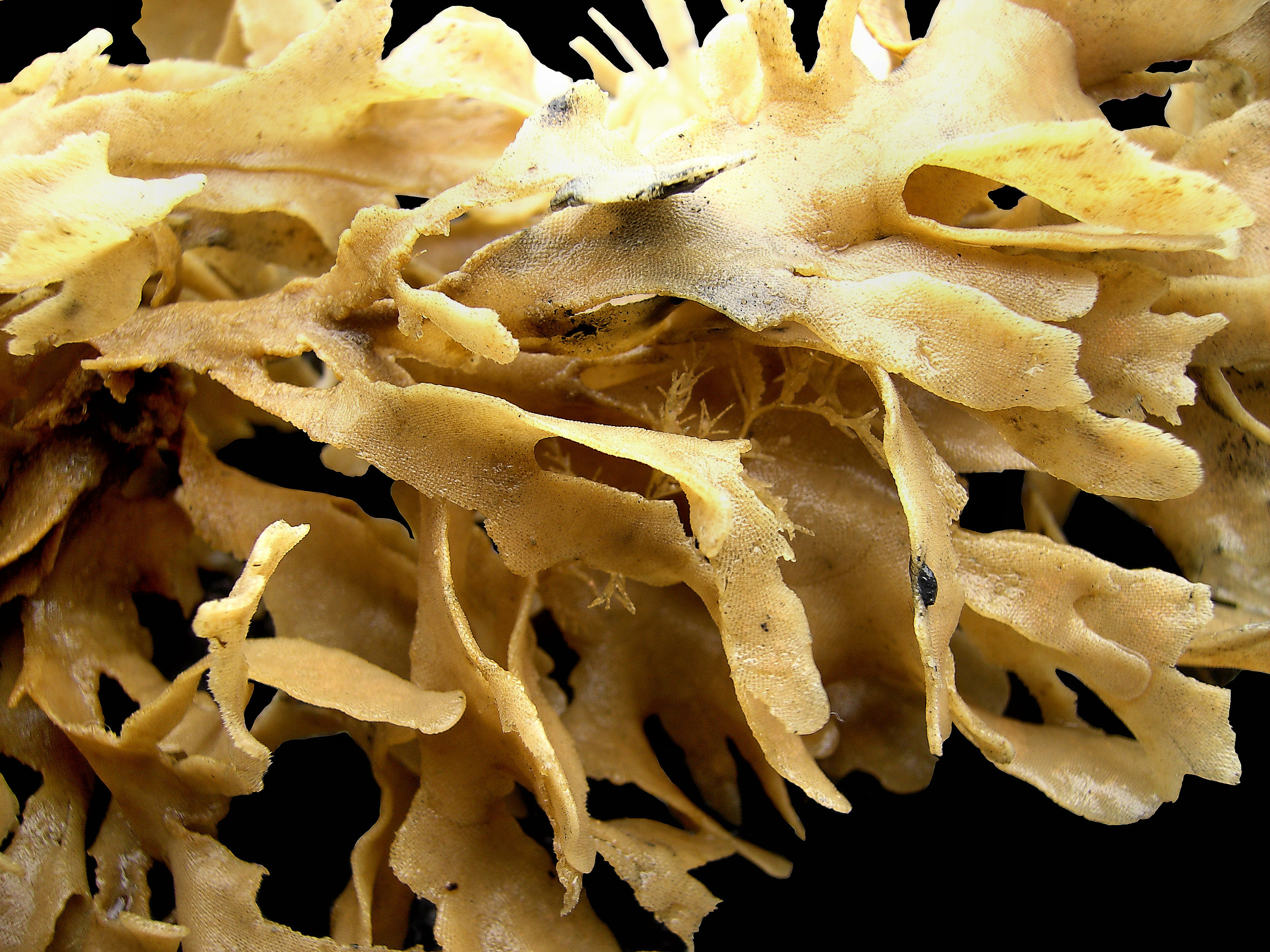
Flustra foliacea

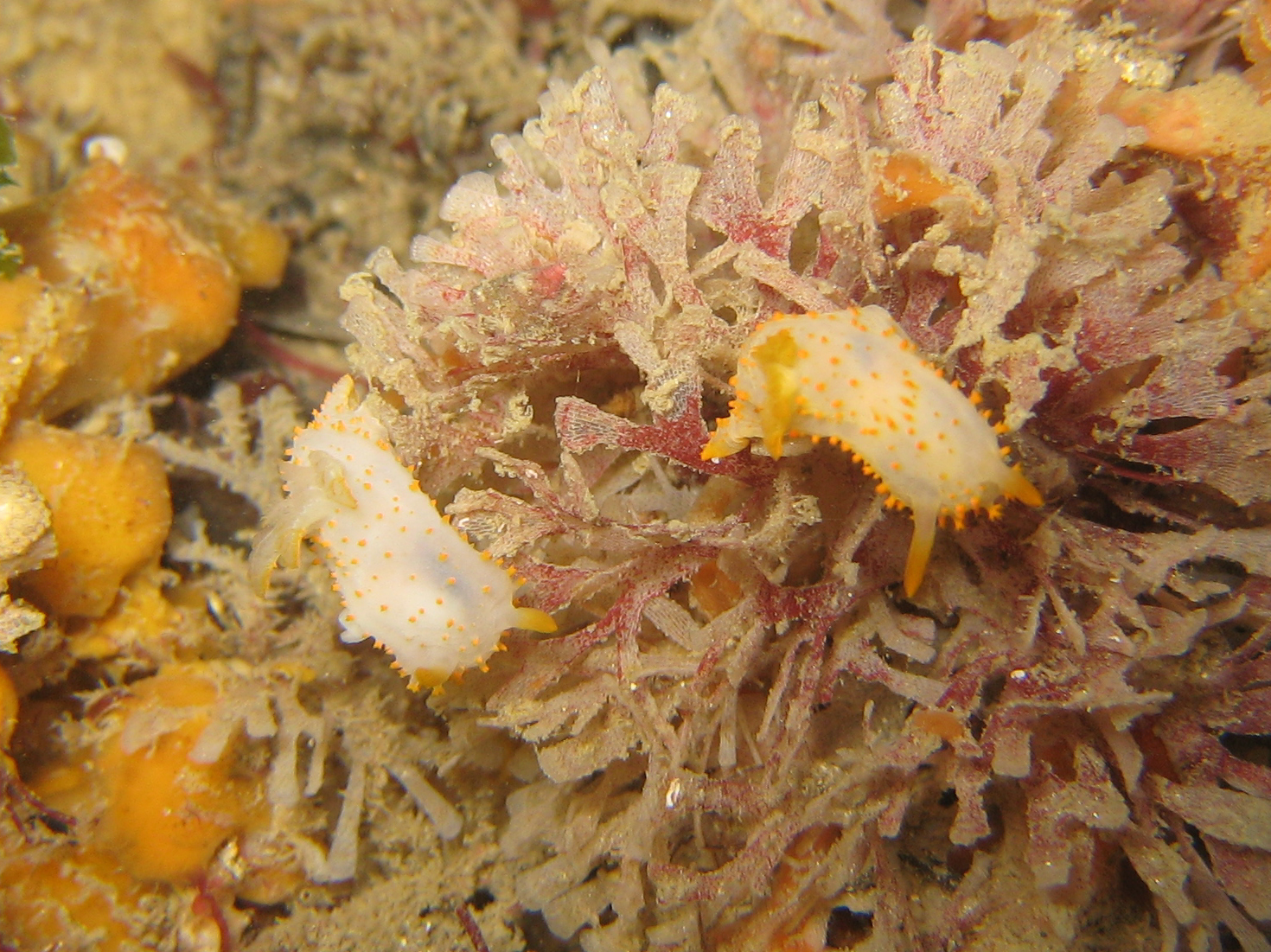
Chartella papyracea

- Carbasea carbasea
- Chartella papyracea
- Flustra foliacea
- Securiflustra securifrons

==== Family Haplopomidae ====
- Haplopoma impressum

==== Family Hippothoidae ====
- Celleporella hyalina

==== Family Membraniporidae ====
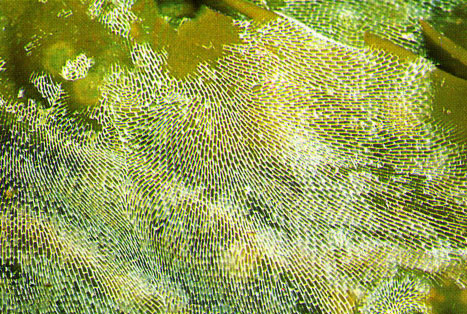
Membranipora membranacea

- Conopeum reticulum
- Conopeum seurati
- Membranipora membranacea

==== Family Microporellidae ====
- Fenestrulina malusii

==== Family Phidoloporidae ====
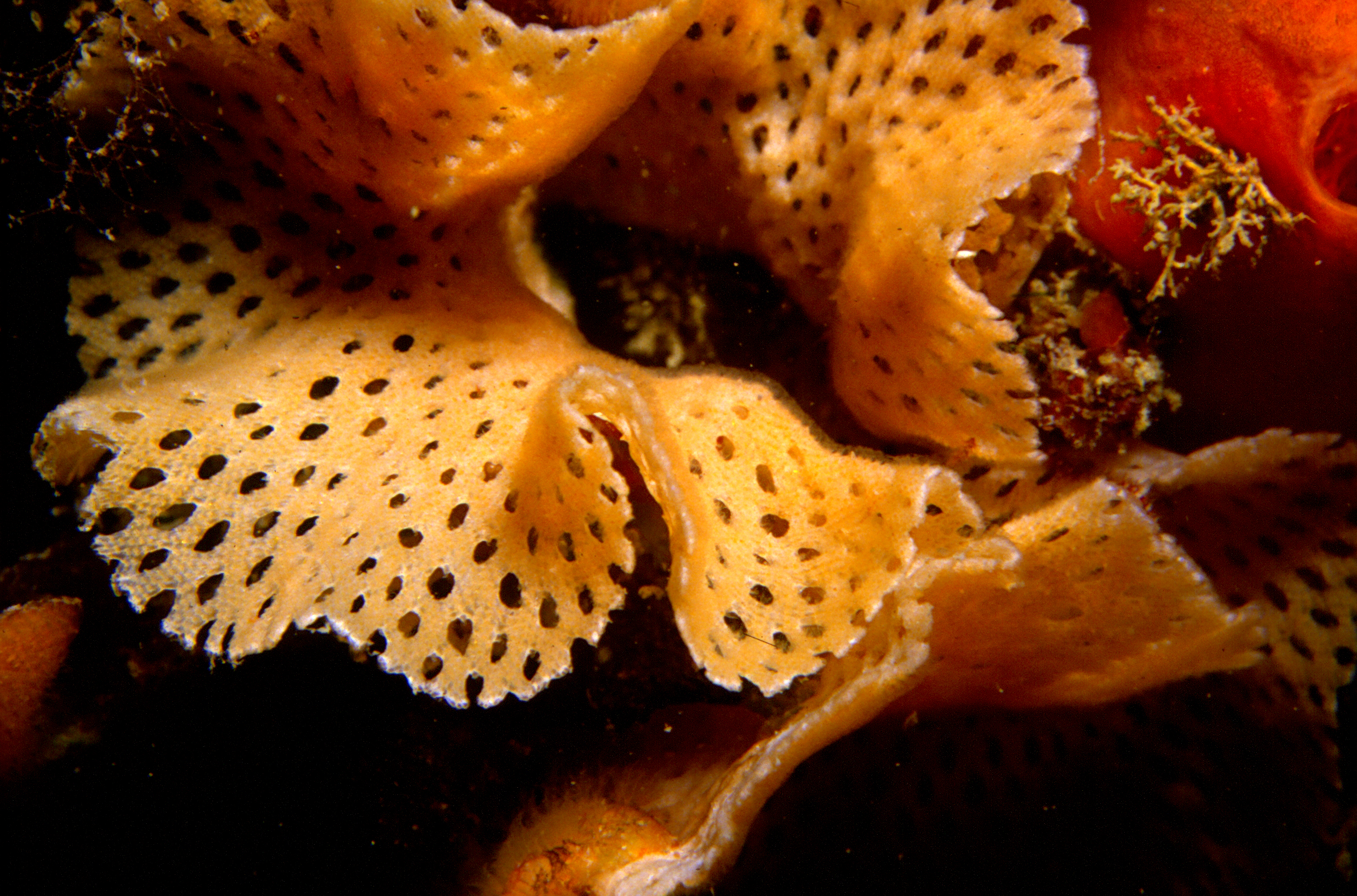
Reteporella grimaldii

- Reteporella beaniana
- Reteporella grimaldii

==== Family Schizoporellidae ====
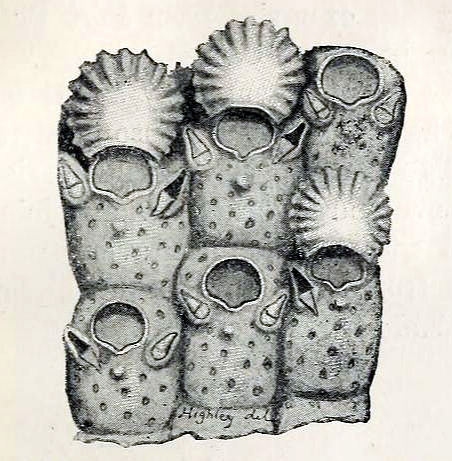
Schizoporella unicornis

- Schizoporella unicornis

==== Family Scrupariidae ====
- Scruparia chelata

==== Family Smittinidae ====
- Parasmittina trispinosa
- Smittina affinis
- Smittoidea reticulata

==== Family Umbonulidae ====
- Oshurkovia littoralis

=== Order Ctenostomatida ===
==== Family Alcyonidiidae ====
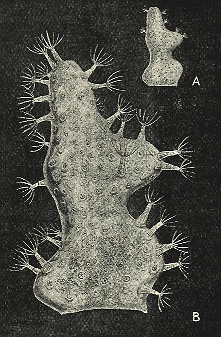
Alcyonidium gelatinosum

- Alcyonidioides mytili
- Alcyonidium diaphanum
- Alcyonidium gelatinosum
- Alcyonidium hirsutum
- Alcyonidium parasiticum

==== Family Flustrellidridae ====
- Flustrellidra hispida

==== Family Vesiculariidae ====
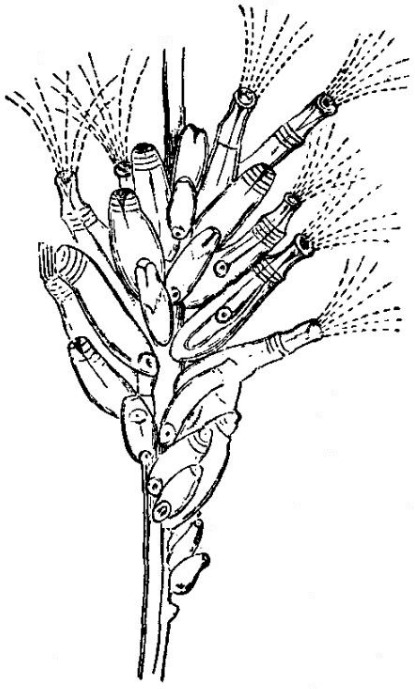
Part of a branch of Bowerbankia pustulosa

- Amathia lendigera
- Bowerbankia imbricata
- Bowerbankia pustulosa
- Vesicularia spinosa

== Class Stenolaemata ==
=== Order Cyclostomatida ===
==== Family Crisiidae ====
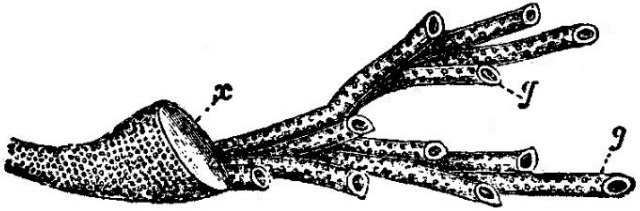
Part of a branch of Crisia eburnea

- Crisia aculeata
- Crisia denticulata
- Crisia eburnea
- Crisidia cornuta
- Filicrisia geniculata

==== Family Lichenoporidae ====
- Disporella hispida

==== Family Plagioeciidae ====
- Plagioecia patina

==== Family Tubuliporidae ====
- Tubulipora liliacea
- Tubulipora plumosa

=== References ===
- Prenant M. et Bobin G., 1966. Bryozoaires. 2ème partie. Chilostomes, Anasca. Faune de France n° 68 647 p.PDF (33 Mo) Identification

=== External links ===
- Marine species identification portal
