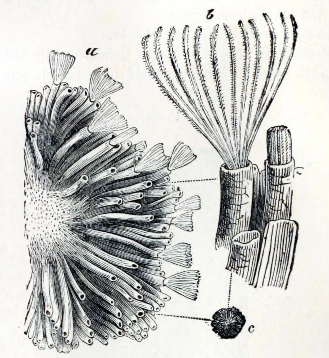
- Tubulipora flabellaris; a) half an incrusting colony, x 8; b) a few cells, x 44; c) a colony, natural size

Scientific classification
- Domain: Eukaryota
- Kingdom: Animalia
- Phylum: Bryozoa
- Class: Stenolaemata
- Order: Cyclostomatida
- Suborder: Tubuliporina

Families
- See text

= Tubuliporina =

Tubuliporina Temporal range: Rhaetian – Recent

Suborder of moss animals

Tubuliporina is a suborder of bryozoans in the order Cyclostomatida. The earliest possible crown-group fossil date to the upper Triassic.

== Families list ==
- Annectocymidae
- Bereniceidae?
- †Celluliporidae
- Cinctiporidae
- Diaperoeciidae
- Diastoporidae
- †Diploclemidae
- Eleidae
- Entalophoridae
- Filisparsidae
- Idmoneidae
- Mecynoeciidae
- Multisparsidae
- Oncousoeciidae
- †Phaceloporidae
- Plagioeciidae
- Pustuloporidae
- †Spiroporidae
- Stomatoporidae
- Tubuliporidae

Genera incertae sedis: Supercytis
