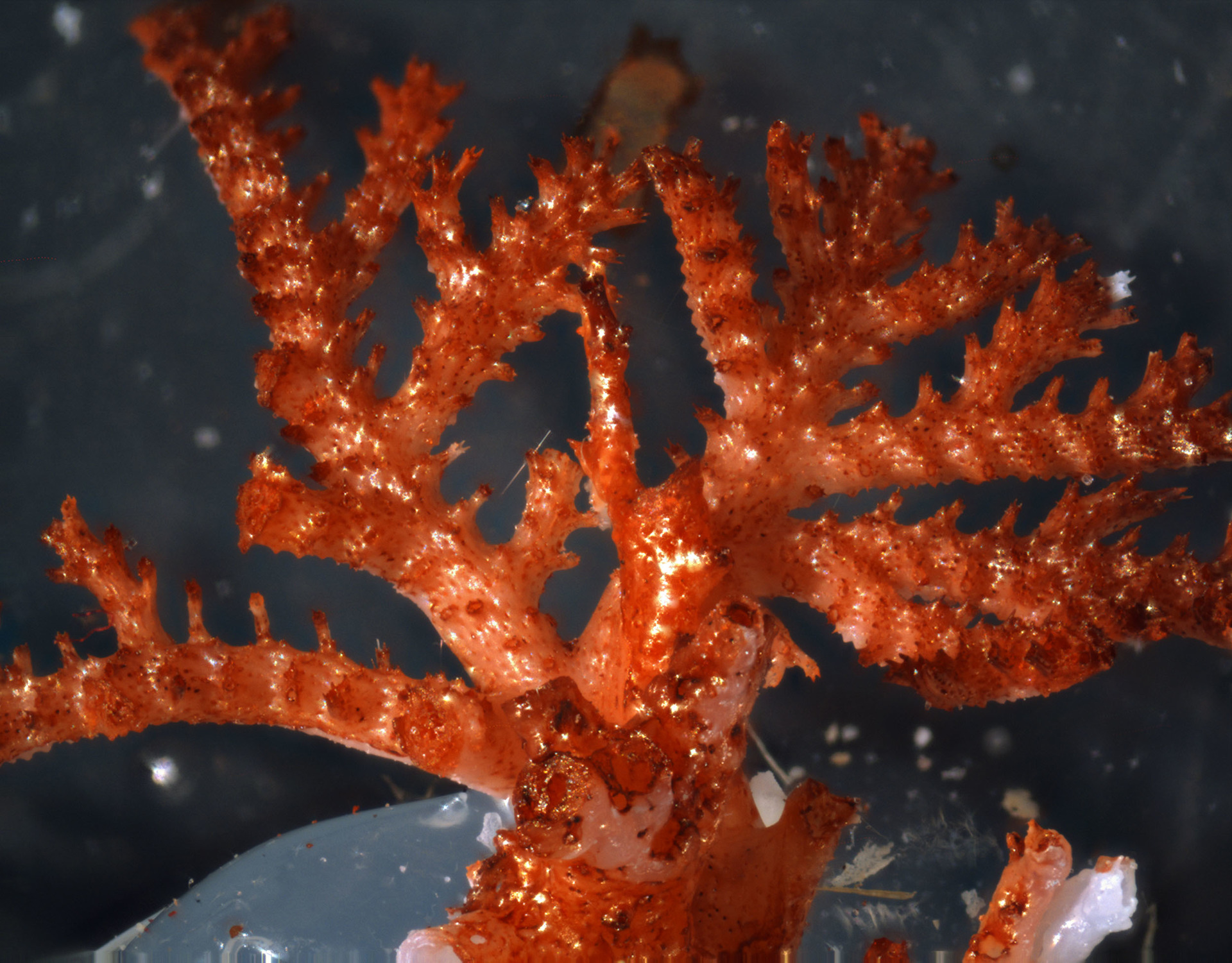
- Spinihornera spinigera

Scientific classification
- Domain: Eukaryota
- Kingdom: Animalia
- Phylum: Bryozoa
- Class: Stenolaemata
- Order: Cyclostomatida
- Suborder: Cancellata; Marsson, 1887

Families
- See text.

= Cancellata =

Suborder of moss animals

Cancellata is a suborder of bryozoans in the order Cyclostomatida.

== Families ==
The following families are accepted:

- Calvetiidae Borg, 1944 (1+ Genera, 2+ Species)
- † Canaliporidae Brood, 1972 (1+ Genera, 4+ Species)
- † Crassodiscoporidae Brood, 1972 (1+ Genera, 1+ Species)
- Crisinidae d'Orbigny, 1853 (15+ Genera, 18+ Species)
- Ctyididae d'Orbigny, 1854 (27+ Genera, 28+ Species)
- Horneridae Smitt, 1867 (5+ Genera, 8+ Species)
- Petaloporidae Gregory, 1899 (13+ Genera, 13+ Species)
- Pseudidmoneidae Borg, 1944 (1+ Genera, 1+ Species)
- Stigmatoechidae Brood, 1972 (1+ Genera, 5+ Species)

The following were formerly included

- Radioporidae is now accepted as Lichenoporidae Smitt, 1867
- Stegohorneridae Borg, 1944 is now accepted as Stigmatoechidae Brood, 1972

== See also ==
- List of Cyclostomatida families
