= Bicrisia abyssicola =

Scientific classification
- Domain: Eukaryota
- Kingdom: Animalia
- Phylum: Bryozoa
- Class: Stenolaemata
- Order: Cyclostomatida
- Family: Crisiidae
- Genus: Bicrisia
- Species: B. abyssicola

Binomial name
- Bicrisia abyssicola Kluge, 1962

Species of bryozoan

Bicrisia abyssicola is a species of bryozoan within the family Crisiidae. It lives in benthic marine environments within the Arctic Ocean, where it feeds off zooplankton. It has also been found in waters off the United Kingdom and Norway.
