= Crisia acuta =

Crisia acuta Temporal range: Paleogene

Scientific classification
- Domain: Eukaryota
- Kingdom: Animalia
- Phylum: Bryozoa
- Class: Stenolaemata
- Order: Cyclostomatida
- Family: Crisiidae
- Genus: Crisia
- Species: C. acuta

Binomial name
- Crisia acuta Maplestone, 1908

Extinct species of marine bryozoan

Crisia acuta is an extinct species of marine bryozoan within the family Crisiidae. It lived in the Paleogene period in southeastern Australia, with the locality being from Cape Otway. The species is distinguished by the convexity and smoothness of the zoarium in its front surface.
