= Crisia elegans =

Scientific classification
- Domain: Eukaryota
- Kingdom: Animalia
- Phylum: Bryozoa
- Class: Stenolaemata
- Order: Cyclostomatida
- Family: Crisiidae
- Genus: Crisia
- Species: C. elegans

Binomial name
- Crisia elegans Lamouroux, 1821

Species of moss animal

Crisia elegans is a species of bryozoans in the family Crisiidae. It was described from Cape of Good Hope in South Africa.
