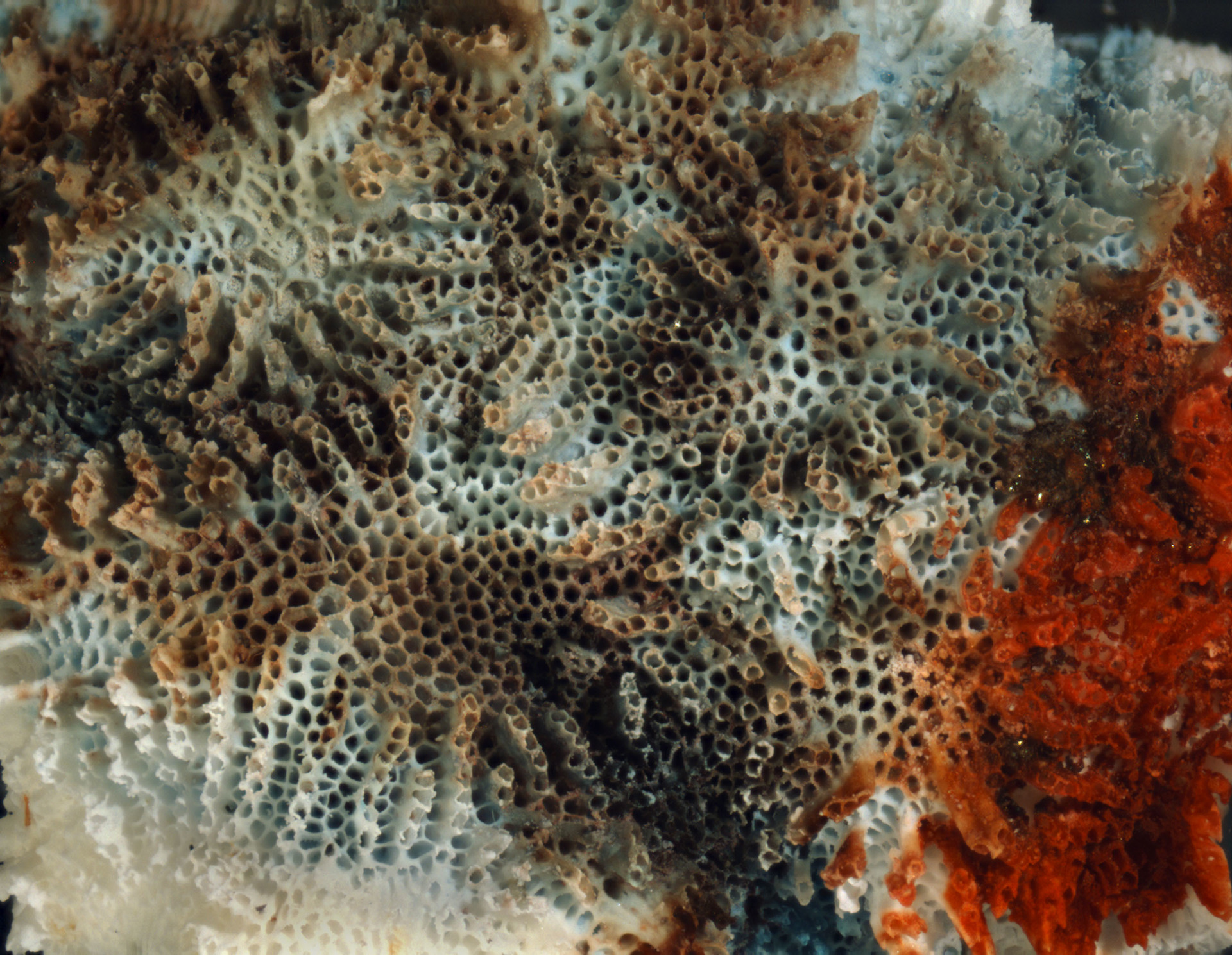
- Lichenopora intricata

Scientific classification
- Kingdom: Animalia
- Phylum: Bryozoa
- Class: Stenolaemata
- Order: Cyclostomatida
- Family: Lichenoporidae
- Genus: Lichenopora; Defrance, 1823

= Lichenopora =

Genus of bryozoans

Lichenopora is a genus of bryozoans belonging to the family Lichenoporidae.

The genus has cosmopolitan distribution.

Species:

- Lichenopora aldingensis Waters, 1884
- Lichenopora annularis (Heller, 1867)
- Lichenopora australis Hall, 1895
- Lichenopora bassleri Canu & Lecointre, 1934
- Lichenopora betsibokensis Brood, 1976
- Lichenopora boletiformis (Reuss, 1869)
- Lichenopora bueltenensis Voigt, 1924
- Lichenopora burdigalensis Duvergier, 1921
- Lichenopora butzmanni Voigt, 1924
- Lichenopora californica Conrad, 1855
- Lichenopora canui Roger & Buge, 1946
- Lichenopora castanyi Buge, 1956
- Lichenopora cavernosa (von Hagenow, 1851)
- Lichenopora cochloidea (d'Orbigny, 1854)
- Lichenopora conica Ortmann, 1890
- Lichenopora convergens Canu & Lecointre, 1934
- Lichenopora convexa Canu, 1909
- Lichenopora costata (von Hagenow, 1846)
- Lichenopora cribraria Hall, 1895
- Lichenopora cyatiformis (Manzoni, 1878)
- Lichenopora davidi El Hajjaji, 1992
- Lichenopora defranciana Michelin, 1845
- Lichenopora depressa d'Orbigny, 1853
- Lichenopora diadema
- Lichenopora discoplanata Neviani, 1939
- Lichenopora elegantissima Borg, 1944
- Lichenopora elliptica Canu, 1916
- Lichenopora erecta Canu, 1910
- Lichenopora falunica Buge, 1957
- Lichenopora fasciculifera Canu & Bassler, 1929
- Lichenopora fava O'Donoghue & O'Donoghue, 1923
- Lichenopora filifera Canu & Bassler, 1929
- Lichenopora foveolata (Marsson, 1887)
- Lichenopora fungicula (Michelin, 1847)
- Lichenopora gregoryi Canu, 1909
- Lichenopora grignonensis (Milne Edwards, 1838)
- Lichenopora huillereti Balavoine, 1956
- Lichenopora interradiata Walter, 1989
- Lichenopora interrupta (Reuss, 1869)
- Lichenopora intricata (Busk, 1856)
- Lichenopora irregularis (J.Y.Johnson, 1897)
- Lichenopora japonica Busk, 1944
- Lichenopora lamellosa Canu & Bassler, 1929
- Lichenopora lecointrei Buge, 1957
- Lichenopora loveni Borg, 1944
- Lichenopora macropora (Hamm, 1881)
- Lichenopora magnicentralis Canu, 1919
- Lichenopora magnifica MacGillivray, 1869
- Lichenopora meandriformis Canu & Lecointre, 1933
- Lichenopora mellevillensis (d'Orbigny, 1854)
- Lichenopora mucronata Canu & Lecointre, 1933
- Lichenopora multifascigera Canu & Lecointre, 1934
- Lichenopora neocomiensis (d'Orbigny, 1853)
- Lichenopora nevianii Borg, 1944
- Lichenopora orbignyana Etallon, 1862
- Lichenopora orientalis Balavoine, 1960
- Lichenopora parva Gordon & Taylor, 1997
- Lichenopora pedunculata Voigt, 1989
- Lichenopora perneri Prantl, 1929
- Lichenopora picoensis Jullien, 1903
- Lichenopora placenta (Reuss, 1872)
- Lichenopora porosa Hall, 1895
- Lichenopora prolifica Jullien, 1903
- Lichenopora proposita Canu & Lecointre, 1934
- Lichenopora quincuncialis Canu & Bassler, 1929
- Lichenopora radiata (Reuss, 1846)
- Lichenopora radiuscula Lagaaij, 1952
- Lichenopora reussi Buge, 1957
- Lichenopora rifensis El Hajjaji, 1992
- Lichenopora rogeri Buge, 1957
- Lichenopora schoelleri Vigneaux, 1948
- Lichenopora spinata J.Y.Johnson, 1897
- Lichenopora stellata
- Lichenopora stelliformis (Michelin, 1845)
- Lichenopora strougoi Safori, 2000
- Lichenopora tenuifasciculifera Canu & Lecointre, 1934
- Lichenopora tubicen Borg, 1944
- Lichenopora tubulifera Canu & Lecointre, 1934
- Lichenopora turbinata Defrance, 1823
- Lichenopora vireti David, 1965
- Lichenopora wilsoni MacGillivray, 1886
