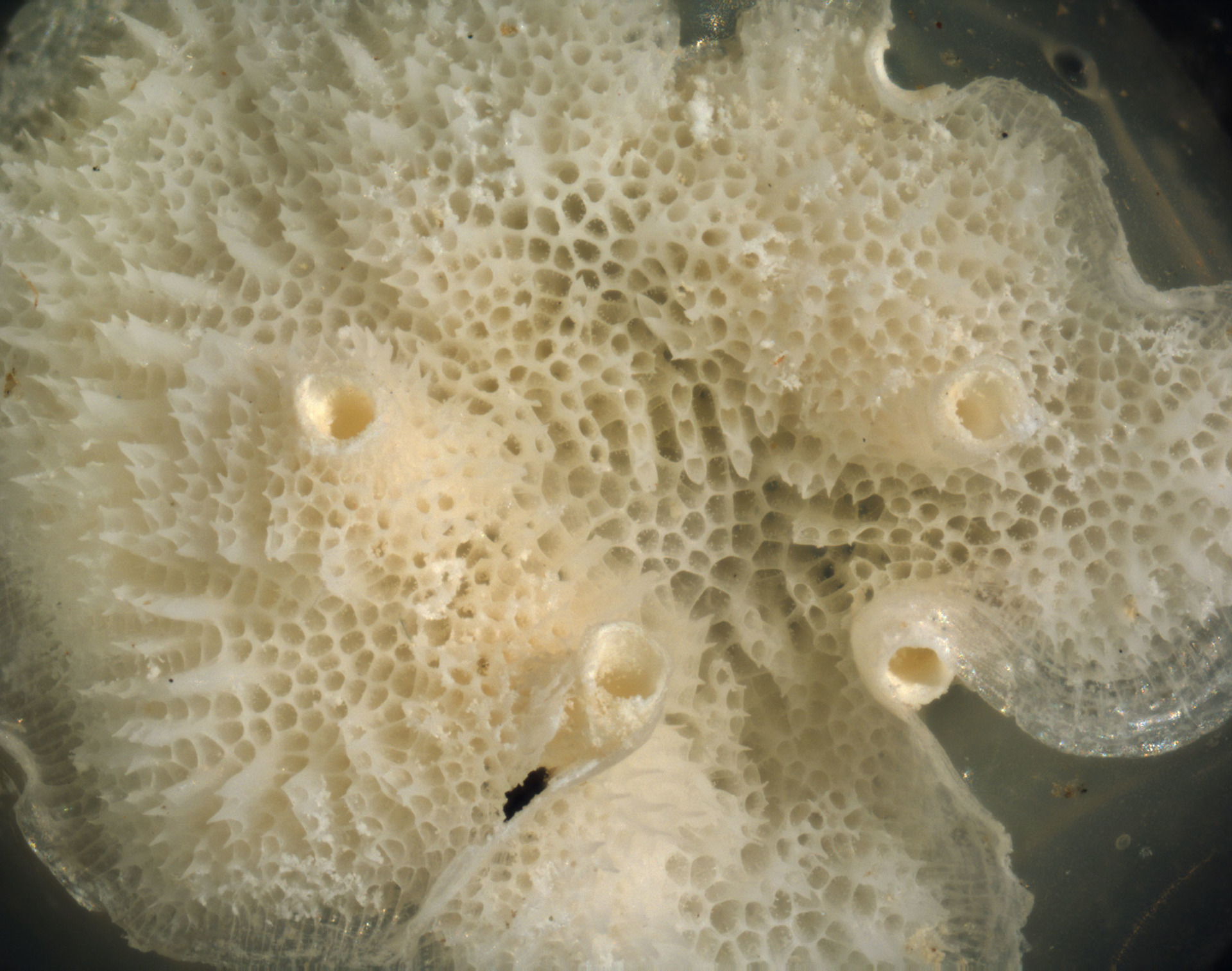
- Disporella novaezelandiae

Scientific classification
- Kingdom: Animalia
- Phylum: Bryozoa
- Class: Stenolaemata
- Order: Cyclostomatida
- Family: Lichenoporidae
- Genus: Disporella; Gray, 1848

= Disporella =

Genus of bryozoans

Disporella is a genus of bryozoans belonging to the family Lichenoporidae.

The genus has cosmopolitan distribution.

Species:

- Disporella alaskensis Osburn, 1953
- Disporella alboranensis Alvarez, 1992
- Disporella algoensis (Busk, 1875)
- Disporella anhaltina (Stoliczka, 1862)
- Disporella astraea Osburn, 1953
- Disporella borgi Alvarez, 1995
- Disporella boutani Alvarez, 1995
- Disporella brasiliana Winston, Vieira & Woollacott, 2014
- Disporella bullata (MacGillivray, 1887)
- Disporella buski (Harmer, 1915)
- Disporella buskiana (Canu & Bassler, 1928)
- Disporella calcitrapa Winston & Vieira, 2013
- Disporella californica (d'Orbigny, 1853)
- Disporella canaliculata (Busk, 1876)
- Disporella capillata (Kirkpatrick, 1890)
- Disporella clypeiformis (d'Orbigny, 1842)
- Disporella complicata (Haswell, 1880)
- Disporella composita (Waters, 1918)
- Disporella compta Dick, Tilbrook & Mawatari, 2006
- Disporella confluens (Römer, 1841)
- Disporella cookae David & Pouyet, 1986
- Disporella coronula (Reuss, 1848)
- Disporella crassa Borg, 1944
- Disporella crassiuscula (Smitt, 1867)
- Disporella cristata (Busk, 1875)
- Disporella deformis (Reuss, 1848)
- Disporella densiporoides Moyano, 1982
- Disporella ezoensis Taylor & Grischenko, 2015
- Disporella fimbriata (Busk, 1875)
- Disporella goldfussi (Reuss, 1864)
- Disporella grignonensis (Milne Edwards, 1838)
- Disporella harmeri (Neviani, 1939)
- Disporella hispida (Fleming, 1828)
- Disporella humilis Gordon & Taylor, 2001
- Disporella imperialis (Ortmann, 1890)
- Disporella infundibuliformis (Busk, 1876)
- Disporella julesi d'Hondt & Mascarell, 2004
- Disporella laticosta (Reuss, 1864)
- Disporella marambioensis Hara, 2001
- Disporella minicamera Gordon & Taylor, 2010
- Disporella minima Moyano, 1991
- Disporella minutissima Gordon & Taylor, 2010
- Disporella mosquensis (Gerasimov, 1955)
- Disporella novaehollandiae (d'Orbigny, 1853)
- Disporella octoradiata (Waters, 1904)
- Disporella osburni Winston & Jackson, 2021
- Disporella ovoidea Osburn, 1953
- Disporella pattersonae (Chapman, 1933)
- Disporella phaohoa Dick, Ngai & Doan, 2020
- Disporella pila Marcus, 1955
- Disporella piramidata Alvarez, 1992
- Disporella plumosa Winston & Hakansson, 1986
- Disporella porosa (Haswell, 1880)
- Disporella pristis (MacGillivray, 1884)
- Disporella radiata (Busk, 1859)
- Disporella robusta Alvarez, 1992
- Disporella sacculus Gordon & Taylor, 2001
- Disporella sagamiensis (Okada, 1917)
- Disporella separata Osburn, 1953
- Disporella smitti (Calvet, 1906)
- Disporella spinulosa Jullien, 1888
- Disporella stellata (Reuss, 1848)
- Disporella tridentata (Haswell, 1880)
- Disporella truncata (Philipps, 1900)
- Disporella umbellata
- Disporella verrucosa (Philippi, 1843)
- Disporella violacea (Canu & Bassler, 1928)
- Disporella wanganuiensis (Waters, 1887)
- Disporella xianqiureni Liu, Liu & Zágoršek, 2019
- Disporella zurigneae Alvarez, 1992
