= Cinctipora elegans =

Scientific classification
- Domain: Eukaryota
- Kingdom: Animalia
- Phylum: Bryozoa
- Class: Stenolaemata
- Order: Cyclostomatida
- Family: Cinctiporidae
- Genus: Cinctipora
- Species: C. elegans

Binomial name
- Cinctipora elegans Hutton, 1873

Species of moss animal

Cinctipora elegans is a bryozoan species in the genus Cinctipora found in shallow sea-bed around New Zealand. Fossils of the species are also known.
