= Spiritopora =

Conservation status
- Nationally Vulnerable (NZ TCS)

Scientific classification
- Domain: Eukaryota
- Kingdom: Animalia
- Phylum: Bryozoa
- Class: Stenolaemata
- Order: Cyclostomatida
- Family: Diaperoeciidae
- Genus: Spiritopora; Taylor & Gordon, 2003
- Species: S. perplexa

Binomial name
- Spiritopora perplexa Taylor & Gordon, 2003

Genus of marine invertebrate

Spiritopora is a genus of marine invertebrate. The only known species is Spiritopora perplexa which is endemic to New Zealand. It is a cyclostome bryozoan, in the family Diaperoeciidae and order Cyclostomatida, described by Taylor and Gordon in 2003.

Spiritopora perplexa has been found only in Piwhane / Spirits Bay at the northern tip of the North Island of New Zealand.
