= Actinoporidae =

Scientific classification
- Kingdom: Animalia
- Phylum: Bryozoa
- Class: Stenolaemata
- Order: Cyclostomatida
- Family: Actinoporidae

Family of bryozoans

Actinoporidae is a family of bryozoans belonging to the order Cyclostomatida.

Genera:

- Actinopora d'Orbigny, 1853
