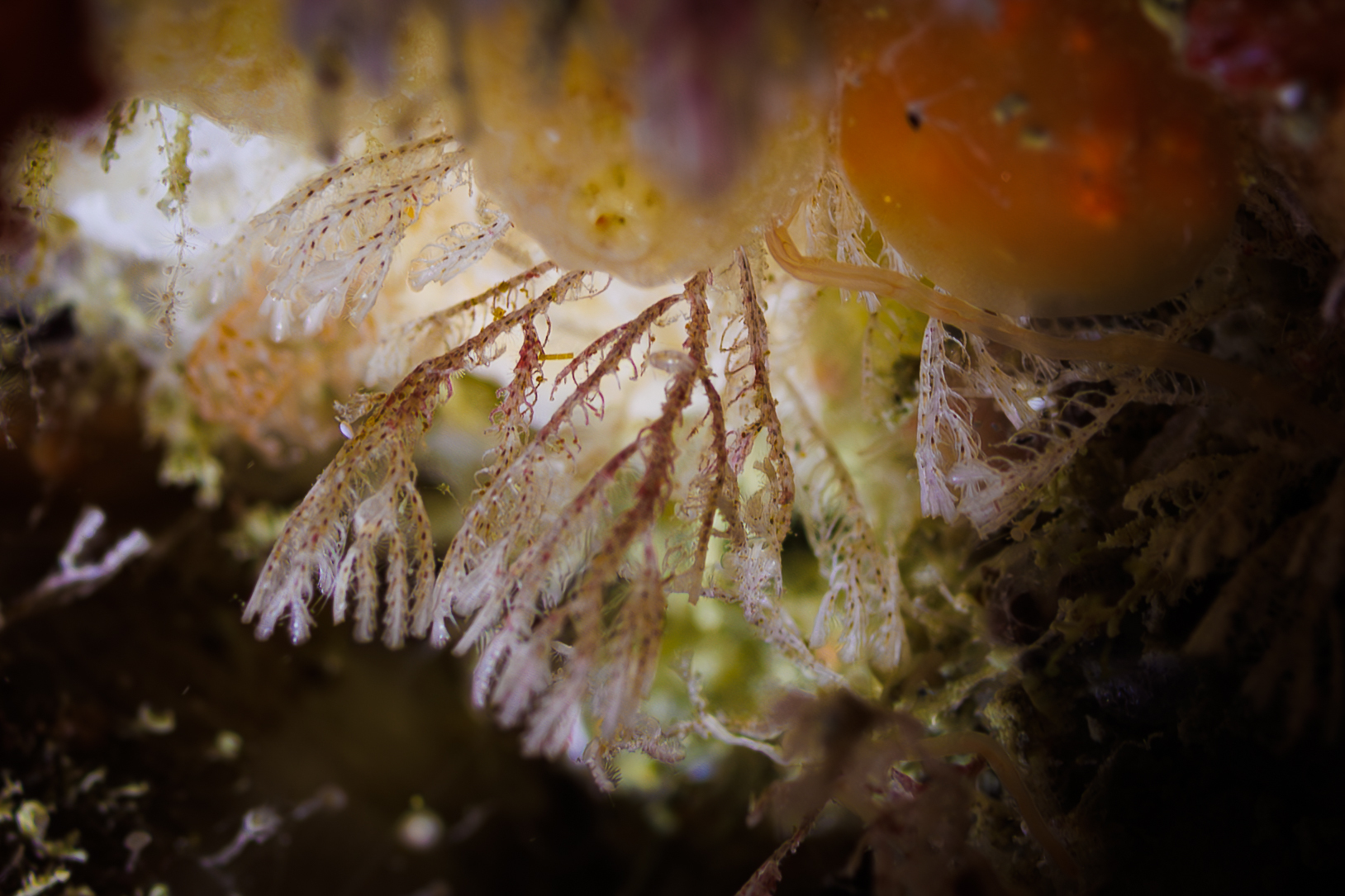
- Bicrisia edwardsiana

Scientific classification
- Kingdom: Animalia
- Phylum: Bryozoa
- Class: Stenolaemata
- Order: Cyclostomatida
- Family: Crisiidae
- Genus: Bicrisia d'Orbigny, 1853

= Bicrisia =

Genus of bryozoans

Bicrisia is a genus of bryozoans belonging to the family Crisiidae.

The genus has an almost cosmopolitan distribution.

== Species ==
The following species are recognised in the genus Bicrisia:

- Bicrisia abyssicola Kluge, 1962
- Bicrisia biciliata (MacGillivray, 1869)
- Bicrisia edwardsiana (d'Orbigny, 1841)
- Bicrisia erecta Mawatari & Mawatari, 1973
- Bicrisia gibraltarensis Harmelin, 1990
- Bicrisia robertsonae Soule, Soule & Chaney, 1995
