= Cinctipora =

Scientific classification
- Domain: Eukaryota
- Kingdom: Animalia
- Phylum: Bryozoa
- Class: Stenolaemata
- Order: Cyclostomatida
- Family: Cinctiporidae
- Genus: Cinctipora; Hutton, 1873

Species
- Cinctipora elegans Hutton 1873

Genus of moss animals

Cinctipora is a genus of bryozoans in the family Cinctiporidae also known in fossil records.

== See also ==
- List of prehistoric bryozoans
