= Idmonea =

Scientific classification
- Kingdom: Animalia
- Phylum: Bryozoa
- Class: Stenolaemata
- Order: Cyclostomatida
- Family: Idmoneidae
- Genus: Idmonea; Lamouroux, 1821

Genus of bryozoans

Idmonea is a genus of bryozoans belonging to the family Idmoneidae.

The genus has almost cosmopolitan distribution.

Species:

- Idmonea affinis De Raynevald, von Heck & Ponzi, 1854
- Idmonea aldingensis Waters, 1884
- Idmonea alfredi (Haime, 1854)
- Idmonea alipes Gregory, 1899
- Idmonea alternata Tenison-Woods, 1880
- Idmonea arborea Calvet, 1911
- Idmonea arcuata Canu & Bassler, 1920
- Idmonea bacillaris Seguenza, 1880
- Idmonea bairnsdalei MacGillivray, 1895
- Idmonea bialternata Gregory, 1893
- Idmonea bifrons Waters, 1884
- Idmonea brutia Neviani, 1900
- Idmonea californica Conrad, 1855
- Idmonea carinata Roemer, 1841
- Idmonea complanata d'Orbigny, 1850
- Idmonea compressa Brood, 1977
- Idmonea concinna Maplestone, 1908
- Idmonea conferta MacGillivray, 1895
- Idmonea conferta Seguenza, 1880
- Idmonea cristata (Meunier & Pergens, 1885)
- Idmonea delicatissima Maplestone, 1908
- Idmonea denticulata (Canu & Bassler, 1926)
- Idmonea diligens Mokrinskij, 1916
- Idmonea divergens MacGillivray, 1895
- Idmonea elongata Maplestone, 1908
- Idmonea erecta Calvet, 1902
- Idmonea expansa Ulrich & Bassler, 1904
- Idmonea falciformis Ortmann, 1890
- Idmonea fasciculata Maplestone, 1909
- Idmonea fenestrata Busk, 1859
- Idmonea flabellata Kirchenpauer, 1869
- Idmonea frondosa Meneghini, 1845
- Idmonea galeotti Nyst, 1843
- Idmonea geminata MacGillivray, 1895
- Idmonea gracilis (von Hagenow, 1846)
- Idmonea gracilis Meneghini, 1844
- Idmonea grandiora Canu & Bassler, 1920
- Idmonea granulata Milne Edwards, 1838
- Idmonea grateloupi d'Orbigny, 1853
- Idmonea hedenborgi Manzoni, 1877
- Idmonea horrida Calvet, 1906
- Idmonea insolita Jullien, 1882
- Idmonea lata MacGillivray, 1895
- Idmonea macgillivrayi Stach, 1936
- Idmonea magna Canu & Bassler, 1920
- Idmonea magnireversa Canu & Bassler, 1920
- Idmonea marionensis Busk, 1875
- Idmonea minor L.
- Idmonea minor L.u.Yang, 1981
- Idmonea morningtoniensis Maplestone, 1908
- Idmonea nana Calvet, 1902
- Idmonea obliqua (d'Orbigny, 1853)
- Idmonea parasitica (von Hagenow, 1839)
- Idmonea parvula Canu & Bassler, 1920
- Idmonea parvula Maplestone, 1908
- Idmonea pedata Norman, 1909
- Idmonea pseudodisticha von Hagenow, 1851
- Idmonea radiata (Hennig, 1894)
- Idmonea radiolitorum d'Orbigny, 1850
- Idmonea rostrigera Balavoine, 1960
- Idmonea rugica (Voigt, 1924)
- Idmonea schlumbergeri Locard, 1878
- Idmonea seguenzai Neviani, 1900
- Idmonea semispiralis MacGillivray, 1895
- Idmonea simplex (de Loriol, 1863)
- Idmonea sloani Canu & Bassler, 1920
- Idmonea snehi Wilson, Bosch & Taylor, 2015
- Idmonea spica Seguenza, 1880
- Idmonea subcarinata d'Orbigny, 1853
- Idmonea subdistica De Gregorio, 1890
- Idmonea tortuosa Kirkpatrick, 1888
- Idmonea translucens Voigt, 1924
- Idmonea triangularis (Hennig, 1894)
- Idmonea triquetra Lamouroux, 1821
- Idmonea tuberosa d'Orbigny, 1853
- Idmonea tubulipora Meneghini, 1847
- Idmonea tumida (Smitt, 1872)
- Idmonea uniseriata Maplestone, 1908
- Idmonea venusta MacGillivray, 1895
