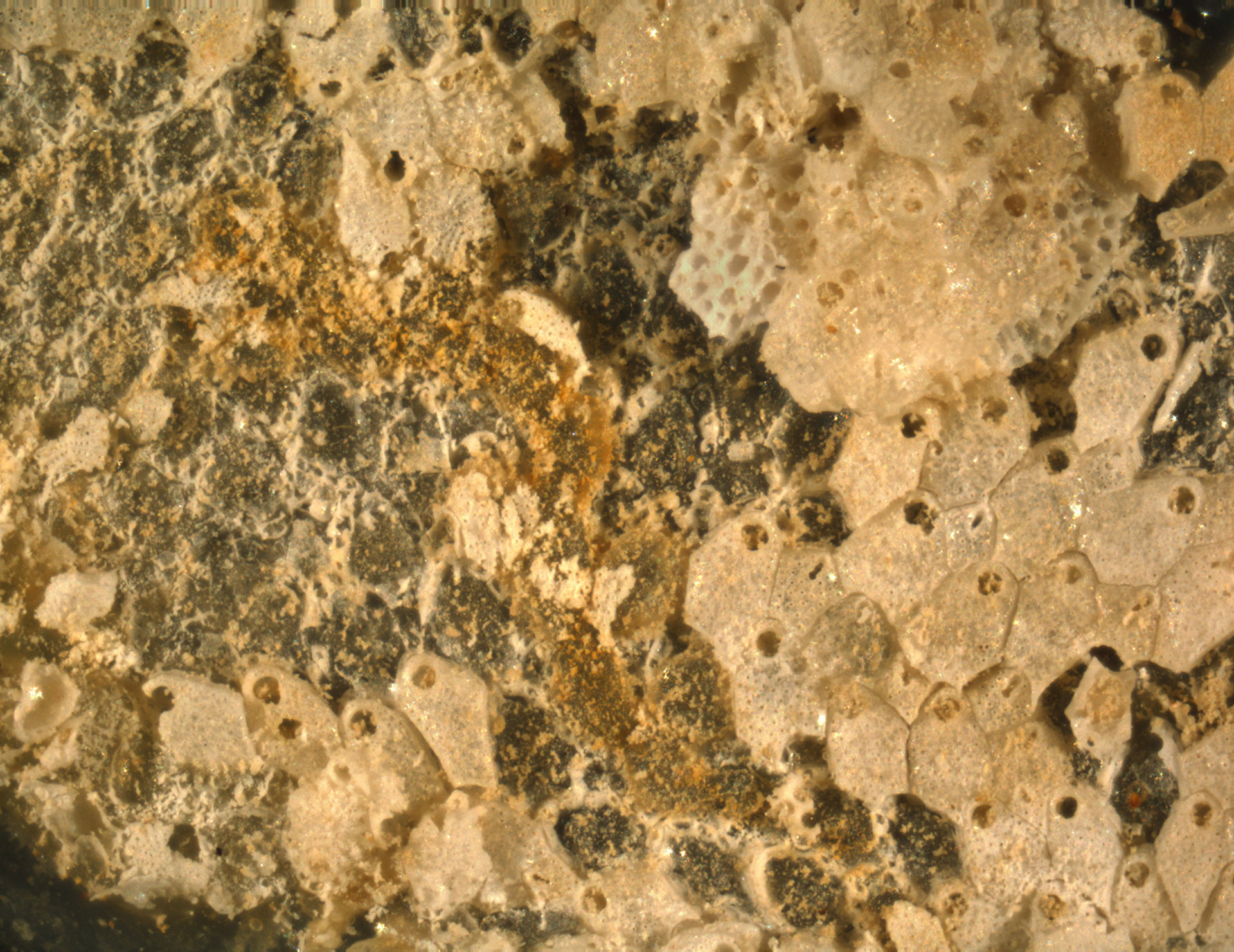
- Proboscina

Scientific classification
- Kingdom: Animalia
- Phylum: Bryozoa
- Class: Stenolaemata
- Order: Cyclostomatida
- Family: Oncousoeciidae
- Genus: Proboscina; Audouin, 1826

= Proboscina =

Genus of bryozoans

Proboscina is a genus of bryozoans belonging to the family Oncousoeciidae.

The genus has almost cosmopolitan distribution.

Species:

- Proboscina admota Canu & Bassler, 1920
- Proboscina alternata Canu & Bassler, 1920
- Proboscina alternata d'Orbigny, 1852
- Proboscina anceps Canu & Bassler, 1920
- Proboscina angula (Počta, 1892)
- Proboscina angustiramae Canu & Lecointre, 1933
- Proboscina anomala Reuss, 1872
- Proboscina bifurcata Canu, 1919
- Proboscina bohemica Novak, 1877
- Proboscina boryi (Audouin, 1826)
- Proboscina celsa Voigt, 1924
- Proboscina clavatiramosa Canu & Bassler, 1920
- Proboscina clavatula Canu & Bassler, 1920
- Proboscina coapta Canu & Bassler, 1929
- Proboscina colubra Canu & Bassler, 1920
- Proboscina compacta Canu & Lecointre, 1933
- Proboscina concava Weiss, 1988
- Proboscina confluens Reuss, 1864
- Proboscina conveniens Canu & Bassler, 1920
- Proboscina cornigera (Michelin, 1847)
- Proboscina cottreaui Canu & Lecointre, 1933
- Proboscina cranei Canu & Bassler, 1920
- Proboscina crassa (Römer, 1840)
- Proboscina crassitubae Canu & Lecointre, 1933
- Proboscina cunningtoni Gregory, 1895
- Proboscina denticulata Voigt, 1983
- Proboscina desoudini (Haime, 1854)
- Proboscina divergens Canu & Bassler, 1920
- Proboscina dutertrei Orieux, 1939
- Proboscina echinata (Munster, 1826)
- Proboscina elegans Canu & Lecointre, 1933
- Proboscina erecta Canu & Lecointre, 1933
- Proboscina erucaeformis Wolfer, 1913
- Proboscina exigua Canu & Bassler, 1920
- Proboscina expansa Etallon, 1862
- Proboscina expatiata Canu & Bassler, 1920
- Proboscina fascicularis (d'Orbigny, 1850)
- Proboscina fasciculata (Reuss, 1846)
- Proboscina fecunda Kluge, 1962
- Proboscina fimbriata (Lamarck, 1816)
- Proboscina fragilis Moyano, 1991
- Proboscina francorum (Pergens, 1890)
- Proboscina geminata Canu & Bassler, 1920
- Proboscina gracilis Kluge, 1962
- Proboscina hamzai Safori, 2000
- Proboscina hennigi Brood, 1972
- Proboscina horrida (d'Orbigny, 1851)
- Proboscina hunstantonensis Vine, 1890
- Proboscina idmoneoides Canu & Bassler, 1920
- Proboscina incrassata Smitt, 1867
- Proboscina indivisa Etallon, 1862
- Proboscina ingentis Viskova, 2005
- Proboscina inornata Vine, 1892
- Proboscina interjecta Canu & Lecointre, 1933
- Proboscina jaccardi de Loriol, 1868
- Proboscina japonica Okada, 1923
- Proboscina junctitubae Canu & Lecointre, 1933
- Proboscina khvalynskensis Viskova, 2005
- Proboscina laevigata Canu, 1904
- Proboscina lamellifera Canu & Bassler, 1930
- Proboscina lateralis d'Orbigny, 1853
- Proboscina latifolia d'Orbigny, 1853
- Proboscina latobrevis Canu & Bassler, 1923
- Proboscina laxa Whiteaves, 1891
- Proboscina lecointrei Canu & Lecointre, 1933
- Proboscina lesurensis Canu, 1914
- Proboscina liassica (Quenstedt, 1852)
- Proboscina linearis (Reuss, 1872)
- Proboscina magniramosa Canu & Bassler, 1920
- Proboscina mesleri Canu & Bassler, 1923
- Proboscina michelini (Milne Edwards, 1838)
- Proboscina microstoma Canu, 1904
- Proboscina minnesotensis (Ulrich, 1886)
- Proboscina minuscula Buge, 1957
- Proboscina morinica Sauvage, 1888
- Proboscina mutabilis Canu & Lecointre, 1933
- Proboscina obscura Vine, 1892
- Proboscina orbis Viskova, 2005
- Proboscina parasitica (von Hagenow, 1851)
- Proboscina parca (Römer, 1840)
- Proboscina parviangulata Canu & Bassler, 1920
- Proboscina procera (Počta, 1892)
- Proboscina projecta Canu & Bassler, 1920
- Proboscina prominens Canu & Bassler, 1920
- Proboscina protracta (Počta, 1892)
- Proboscina punctatella Reuss, 1854
- Proboscina pustulosa (Giebel, 1848)
- Proboscina radians (Novak, 1877)
- Proboscina ramea (de Blainville, 1834)
- Proboscina rectalinea Canu & Bassler, 1920
- Proboscina robusta Canu & Bassler, 1928
- Proboscina romeroi (Canu, 1911)
- Proboscina rugosa Canu & Bassler, 1920
- Proboscina rugulosa (Reuss, 1848)
- Proboscina serpulaeformis (Römer, 1840)
- Proboscina sigmata Osburn, 1953
- Proboscina striata (Giebel, 1848)
- Proboscina striata Canu, 1911
- Proboscina striatula Canu & Bassler, 1920
- Proboscina subechinata Canu & Bassler, 1920
- Proboscina subincrassata Canu & Lecointre, 1933
- Proboscina taeniaplana Wolfer, 1913
- Proboscina truncata (von Hagenow, 1839)
- Proboscina tubigera (d'Orbigny, 1853)
- Proboscina tumulosa Ulrich, 1893
- Proboscina undulata Canu & Bassler, 1920
- Proboscina variabilis Canu & Bassler, 1920
- Proboscina watersi Canu, 1912
- Proboscina ziczac (d'Orbigny, 1850)
