= Zagorsekia =

Scientific classification
- Kingdom: Animalia
- Phylum: Bryozoa
- Class: Stenolaemata
- Order: Cyclostomatida
- Family: Tubuliporidae
- Genus: †Zagorsekia; Gordon & Taylor, 2015

Extinct genus of bryozoans

Zagorsekia is an extinct Eocene genus of bryozoan. It formed erect colonies of bifurcating branches, which were a few millimeters long and sometimes terminated in mushroom-like capitula covered in numerous holes that would have contained autozooids. Branches had multiple annulations along their length, which were also covered in large autozooidal apertures and smaller kenozooidal apertures. The genus was discovered in Chatham Island, New Zealand.
