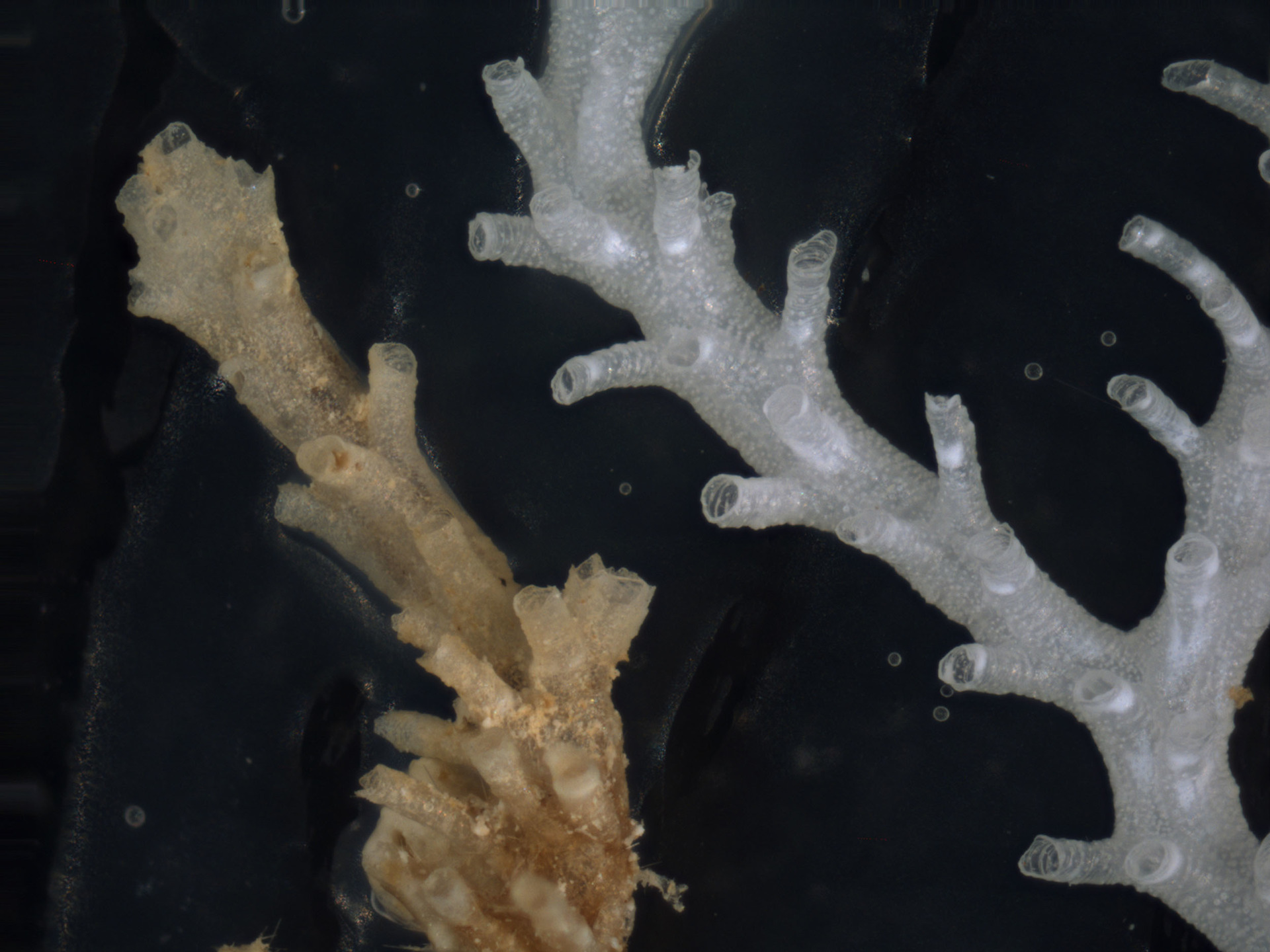
- Nevianipora pulcherrima

Scientific classification
- Kingdom: Animalia
- Phylum: Bryozoa
- Class: Stenolaemata
- Order: Cyclostomatida
- Family: Diaperoeciidae
- Genus: Nevianipora; Borg, 1944

= Nevianipora =

Genus of bryozoans

Nevianipora is a genus of bryozoans belonging to the family Diaperoeciidae.

The genus has cosmopolitan distribution.

Species:

- Nevianipora arcuata Winston, Vieira & Woollacott, 2014
- Nevianipora borgi Buge, 1979
- Nevianipora fasciculata (Canu & Bassler, 1929)
- Nevianipora faxeensis (Pergens & Meunier, 1886)
- Nevianipora floridana (Osburn, 1940)
- Nevianipora gasparensis (MacGillivray, 1887)
- Nevianipora interjuncta MacGillivray, 1886
- Nevianipora isfahani Zágoršek, Yazdi & Bahrami, 2017
- Nevianipora macgillivrayi (Stach, 1936)
- Nevianipora milneana (d'Orbigny, 1842)
- Nevianipora minor (Canu & Bassler, 1929)
- Nevianipora pedleyi (Haswell, 1880)
- Nevianipora pulcherrima (Kirkpatrick, 1890)
- Nevianipora pulcherrimoidea (Liu, 2001)
- Nevianipora rugatata (Liu, 2001)
- Nevianipora rugosa (Osburn, 1940)
- Nevianipora stoliczkai Guha & Nathan, 1996
- Nevianipora subgracilis (d'Orbigny, 1850)
