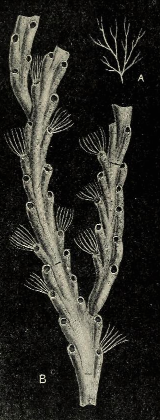
- Crisia denticulata

Scientific classification
- Domain: Eukaryota
- Kingdom: Animalia
- Phylum: Bryozoa
- Class: Stenolaemata
- Order: Cyclostomatida
- Family: Crisiidae
- Genus: Crisia; Lamouroux, 1812

Synonyms
- Crisevia Marcus, 1937

= Crisia =

Crisia Temporal range: 136.4–Recent Ma

Genus of moss animals

Crisia is a genus of bryozoans in the family Crisiidae. Some species are known from the fossil record.

== Species ==
- Crisia acropora Busk, 1852
- Crisia aculeata Hassall, 1841
- Crisia acuminata Busk, 1886
- †Crisia acuta Maplestone, 1908
- †Crisia admota Canu & Lecointre, 1933
- †Crisia angusta Weiss, 1988
- Crisia arctica Sars, 1862
- †Crisia berardi Pergens, 1892
- Crisia bifurcata Brood, 1976
- †Crisia borgii Dartevelle, 1937
- †Crisia boutini Canu, 1909
- Crisia brasiliensis Ramalho & Moraes, 2021
- Crisia bucinaform Okada, 1928
- Crisia calyptostoma Hayward & Ryland, 1978
- Crisia carolina Winston, 2005
- Crisia conferta Busk, 1875
- Crisia constans Kluge, 1946
- Crisia corallina Winston & Jackson, 2021
- †Crisia corbini Canu, 1909
- Crisia crassipes Calvet, 1906
- Crisia cribraria Stimpson, 1854
- Crisia crisidioides Ortmann, 1890
- Crisia cuneata Maplestone, 1905
- Crisia cylindrica Busk, 1886
- Crisia delicatula Canu & Bassler, 1929
- Crisia denticulata (Lamarck, 1816)
- †Crisia destefanii Neviani, 1891
- Crisia eburnea (Linnaeus, 1758)
- Crisia eburneodenticulata Smitt ms in Busk, 1875
- Crisia elegans Lamouroux, 1821
- †Crisia elliptica Hejjas, 1894
- Crisia elongata Milne Edwards, 1838
- Crisia ficulnea Buge, 1979
- Crisia fistulosa (Heller, 1867)
- Crisia fragosa Ramalho, Muricy & Taylor, 2009
- Crisia globosa Mawatari & Mawatari, 1973
- †Crisia gracilis MacGillivray, 1895
- †Crisia grandis Weiss, 1988
- Crisia grimaldi Calvet, 1911
- Crisia guang Liu, Liu & Zágoršek, 2019
- Crisia hamifera Levinsen, 1912
- †Crisia haueri Reuss, 1848
- †Crisia hoernesii Reuss, 1848
- Crisia holdsworthii Busk, 1875
- Crisia howensis Maplestone, 1905
- Crisia hurghadaensis Ziko, El Safori, El Sorogy, El-Wahab, El Dera & Sheata, 2011
- Crisia incurva Haswell, 1880
- Crisia inflata Waters, 1914
- Crisia irregularis Borg, 1944
- Crisia kerguelensis Busk, 1876
- Crisia klugei Ryland, 1967
- †Crisia kuehni Bobies, 1958
- †Crisia lateralis Canu & Lecointre, 1933
- †Crisia lecointrei Bobies, 1958
- †Crisia limata Ponomareva, 1977
- †Crisia lowei Canu & Bassler, 1920
- †Crisia macilenta Ponomareva, 1977
- †Crisia macrostoma MacGillivray, 1895
- Crisia margaritacea Busk, 1875
- Crisia martinicensis d'Orbigny, 1853
- Crisia maxima Robertson, 1910
- †Crisia megalostoma Bobies, 1958
- Crisia micra Marcus, 1955
- †Crisia mirabilis Weiss, 1988
- †Crisia morozovae Ponomareva, 1978
- Crisia nordenskjoldi Borg, 1944
- †Crisia nozeroyensis Voigt & Walter, 1991
- Crisia obliqua Mawatari & Mawatari, 1973
- Crisia occidentalis Trask, 1857
- Crisia operculata Robertson, 1910
- Crisia oranensis Waters, 1916
- Crisia osburni Winston & Hayward, 2012
- Crisia parvinternodata Moyano, 1983
- Crisia patagonica d'Orbigny, 1841
- †Crisia plauensis Pergens, 1892
- †Crisia procera Ponomareva, 1978
- Crisia pseudosolena (Marcus, 1937)
- Crisia pugeti Robertson, 1910
- †Crisia pulchella Canu, 1909
- Crisia pyrula Harmelin, 1990
- Crisia ramosa Harmer, 1891
- Crisia recurva Heller, 1867
- Crisia romanica Zágoršek, Silye & Szabó, 2008
- †Crisia rugosa Ponomareva, 1977
- †Crisia scalaris MacGillivray, 1895
- †Crisia schmitzi Pergens, 1892
- †Crisia serrata d'Orbigny, 1853
- Crisia serrulata Osburn, 1953
- Crisia sertularioides (Audouin, 1826)
- Crisia setosa MacGillivray, 1869
- Crisia sigmoidea Waters, 1916
- Crisia simplex Okada, 1917
- Crisia sinclarensis Busk, 1875
- Crisia spissus Chae, Kil, Zágoršek & Seo, 2018
- †Crisia strangulata Buge, 1956
- †Crisia striatula Canu & Lecointre, 1933
- †Crisia subaequalis Reuss, 1869
- †Crisia taiwanica Hu, 1987
- Crisia tenella Calvet, 1906
- Crisia tenera Okada, 1928
- Crisia tenuis MacGillivray, 1879
- Crisia transversata Brood, 1976
- Crisia tubulosa Busk, 1875
- Crisia vincentensis Waters, 1918
- Crisia zanzibarensis Brood, 1976

== See also ==
- List of prehistoric bryozoan genera
