= Multisparsidae =

Scientific classification
- Domain: Eukaryota
- Kingdom: Animalia
- Phylum: Bryozoa
- Class: Stenolaemata
- Order: Cyclostomatida
- Family: Multisparsidae

Family of bryozoans

Multisparsidae is a family of bryozoans belonging to the order Cyclostomatida.

Genera:

- Collapora Quenstedt, 1881
- Entalophora Androsova, 1968
- Heterohaplooecia Voigt & Viaud, 1983
- Multisparsa d'Orbigny, 1853
- Patulopora Taylor & Wilson, 1999
- Reptoclausa d'Orbigny, 1853
- Reptomultisparsa d'Orbigny, 1853
- Reptotubigera
