= Stomatopora =

Scientific classification
- Kingdom: Animalia
- Phylum: Bryozoa
- Class: Stenolaemata
- Order: Cyclostomatida
- Family: Stomatoporidae
- Genus: Stomatopora; Bronn, 1825

Genus of bryozoans

Stomatopora is a genus of bryozoans belonging to the family Stomatoporidae.

The genus has cosmopolitan distribution.

Species:

- Stomatopora antarctica Waters, 1904
- Stomatopora antiqua Haime, 1854
- Stomatopora bajocensis (d'Orbigny, 1850)
- Stomatopora bifurca Illies, 1971
- Stomatopora bilix Illies, 1971
- Stomatopora cellisalternans Wolfer, 1913
- Stomatopora coarctata Buge, 1957
- Stomatopora compressa Packard, 1863
- Stomatopora contracta Canu & Bassler, 1920
- Stomatopora corallina (d'Orbigny, 1850)
- Stomatopora cornu Canu & Bassler, 1920
- Stomatopora dichotoma (Lamouroux, 1821)
- Stomatopora dichotoma (d'Orbigny, 1839)
- Stomatopora dichotomoides (d'Orbigny, 1850)
- Stomatopora divaricata (Römer, 1839)
- Stomatopora dubia Papp, 1900
- Stomatopora eburnea (d'Orbigny, 1842)
- Stomatopora elevata (d'Orbigny, 1853)
- Stomatopora excavans Canu & Bassler, 1920
- Stomatopora exigua Canu & Bassler, 1920
- Stomatopora fasciculata (Hincks)
- Stomatopora fasciolata Canu & Bassler, 1920
- Stomatopora filiformis Cipolla, 1922
- Stomatopora filiformis de Loriol, 1863
- Stomatopora geminata MacGillivray, 1887
- Stomatopora gingrina Jullien, 1882
- Stomatopora gippslandi Maplestone, 1908
- Stomatopora gracilis (Milne Edwards, 1838)
- Stomatopora granulata Milne Edwards, 1838
- Stomatopora gregoryi Lang, 1905
- Stomatopora hemmoorensis Illies, 1987
- Stomatopora hirsuta Calvet, 1902
- Stomatopora illiesae Guha & Gopikrishna, 2007
- Stomatopora illiesi Bizzarini & Braga, 1994
- Stomatopora irregularis (Hennig, 1894)
- Stomatopora kashpirica Gerasimov, 1955
- Stomatopora kuemmelli Ulrich & Bassler, 1907
- Stomatopora linearis d'Orbigny, 1851
- Stomatopora macroura Illies, 1971
- Stomatopora maeandrina MacGillivray, 1895
- Stomatopora melvillei Pitt & Taylor, 1990
- Stomatopora miniscula Počta, 1892
- Stomatopora minuta Canu & Bassler, 1920
- Stomatopora minuta Kluge, 1946
- Stomatopora nagalurensis Guha & Nathan, 1996
- Stomatopora opposita Canu & Bassler, 1920
- Stomatopora osterfeldi Illies, 1973
- Stomatopora papillosa Brood, 1976
- Stomatopora parnensis Canu, 1909
- Stomatopora parvipora Canu & Bassler, 1920
- Stomatopora parvula (Michelin, 1847)
- Stomatopora parvula Brood, 1972
- Stomatopora pedicellata Marsson, 1887
- Stomatopora polygona Canu & Bassler, 1920
- Stomatopora pratti Canu & Bassler, 1920
- Stomatopora recurva Waagen, 1867
- Stomatopora regularis Gabb & Horn, 1862
- Stomatopora reticulata Calvet, 1900
- Stomatopora richardsoni Lang, 1905
- Stomatopora rugosa Brood, 1976
- Stomatopora rupellensis (d'Orbigny, 1850)
- Stomatopora semierecta Jullien, 1903
- Stomatopora siluriana Bassler, 1928
- Stomatopora simplicissima Viskova, 2005
- Stomatopora spatiosa (Walford, 1889)
- Stomatopora spicea Gregory, 1899
- Stomatopora striatula Canu & Bassler, 1920
- Stomatopora subdivaricata d'Orbigny, 1852
- Stomatopora subgracilis (d'Orbigny, 1853)
- Stomatopora taurinensis Manzoni, 1870
- Stomatopora tenuisa Guha & Nathan, 1996
- Stomatopora thalassae Harmelin, 1979
- Stomatopora trahens (Couch, 1841)
- Stomatopora undulata Wolfer, 1913
- Stomatopora waltoni Haime, 1854
- Stomatopora watersi Canu, 1912
