= Stomatoporina =

Stomatoporina Temporal range: Middle Jurassic–Recent

Scientific classification
- Domain: Eukaryota
- Kingdom: Animalia
- Phylum: Bryozoa
- Class: Stenolaemata
- Order: Cyclostomatida
- Family: Stomatoporidae
- Genus: Stomatoporina; Balavoine, 1958

Type species
- Alecro incurvata Hincks, 1859

Genus of moss animals

Stomatoporina is a genus of stenolaematan bryozoans. The type species is Stomatoporina incurvata. Like almost all bryozoans, it is colonial.

== Species ==
There are three species:

- Stomatoporina incurvata (Hincks, 1859)
- Stomatoporina lamii Balavoine, 1958
- Stomatoporina roberti Balavoine, 1958
