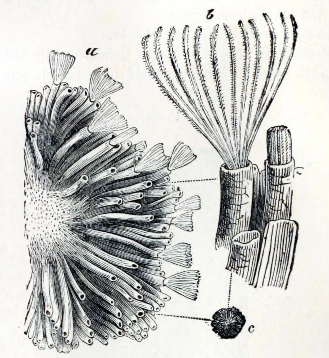
- sketch of Tubulipora flabellaris

Scientific classification
- Kingdom: Animalia
- Phylum: Bryozoa
- Class: Stenolaemata
- Order: Cyclostomatida
- Family: Tubuliporidae
- Genus: Tubulipora; Lamarck, 1816

= Tubulipora =

Genus of bryozoans

Tubulipora is a genus of bryozoans belonging to the family Tubuliporidae, with cosmopolitan distribution and containing these species:

- Tubulipora admiranda Osburn, 1953
- Tubulipora aliciae Soule, Soule & Chaney, 1995
- Tubulipora alternata (Michelin, 1847)
- Tubulipora anderssoni Borg, 1926
- Tubulipora anhaltina (Stoliczka, 1862)
- Tubulipora aperta Harmer, 1898
- Tubulipora biduplicata Waters, 1887
- Tubulipora biserialis Canu & Bassler, 1925
- Tubulipora bocki Borg, 1944
- Tubulipora borgi Kluge, 1946
- Tubulipora brasiliensis Buge, 1979
- Tubulipora capitata Hincks, 1881
- Tubulipora carinata Borg, 1944
- Tubulipora chilensis Brood, 1981
- Tubulipora clavata MacGillivray, 1884
- Tubulipora confracta Winston & Hayward, 2012
- Tubulipora congesta Reuss, 1848
- Tubulipora connata MacGillivray, 1885
- Tubulipora continua Ortmann, 1890
- Tubulipora crates Stimpson, 1854
- Tubulipora cumulus Sinzow, 1892
- Tubulipora dichotoma (De Stefani, 1884)
- Tubulipora dimidiata (Reuss, 1848)
- Tubulipora disposita (Hutton, 1873)
- Tubulipora disticha (Michelin, 1847)
- Tubulipora druidica Busk, 1859
- Tubulipora duplicatocrenata Gontar, 2009
- Tubulipora egregia Osburn, 1953
- Tubulipora eminens Kluge, 1955
- Tubulipora euroa Marcus, 1938
- Tubulipora expansa (Packard, 1863)
- Tubulipora falunica Canu & Lecointre, 1933
- Tubulipora fasciculifera Hincks, 1884
- Tubulipora fimbria Lamarck, 1816
- Tubulipora flabellaris (O.Fabricius, 1780)
- Tubulipora floriformis Hassall, 1841
- Tubulipora foliacea Reuss, 1848
- Tubulipora foraminulata Lamarck, 1816
- Tubulipora fructuosa Gostilovskaya, 1955
- Tubulipora fruticosa Kluge, 1946
- Tubulipora gambierensis Tenison Woods, 1877
- Tubulipora glomerata Hutton, 1873
- Tubulipora gracillima Borg, 1944
- Tubulipora gregaria d'Orbigny, 1853
- Tubulipora hemiphragmata Harmelin, 1976
- Tubulipora hirsuta Canu & Lecointre, 1933
- Tubulipora ingens Canu & Bassler, 1928?
- Tubulipora interrupta Canu & Bassler, 1920
- Tubulipora labiata O'Donoghue & O'Donoghue, 1923
- Tubulipora lecointreae Canu & Lecointre, 1933
- Tubulipora liliacea (Pallas, 1766)
- Tubulipora lobifera Hastings, 1963
- Tubulipora lobulata Hassall, 1841
- Tubulipora lucida MacGillivray, 1885
- Tubulipora lunata Marcus, 1937
- Tubulipora macella Marcus, 1955
- Tubulipora margaritacea Maplestone, 1908
- Tubulipora marisalbi Gostilovskaya, 1955
- Tubulipora meneghini (Heller, 1867)
- Tubulipora midwayanica Canu & Bassler, 1920
- Tubulipora minuta Kluge, 1946
- Tubulipora minuta Maplestone, 1908
- Tubulipora miocenica Michelotti, 1847
- Tubulipora misakiensis Okada, 1917
- Tubulipora mitis Marcus, 1955
- Tubulipora murmanica Kluge, 1955
- Tubulipora mutsu Okada, 1928
- Tubulipora nevianii El Hajjaji, 1989
- Tubulipora nordgaardi Kluge, 1946
- Tubulipora notomala (Busk, 1875)
- Tubulipora orbiculus Lamarck, 1816
- Tubulipora organisans d'Orbigny, 1842
- Tubulipora pacifica Robertson, 1910
- Tubulipora parvus Canu & Bassler, 1928
- Tubulipora patula Canu & Lecointre, 1933
- Tubulipora perforata Liu, Liu & Zágoršek, 2019
- Tubulipora perfragilis Hincks, 1884
- Tubulipora phalangea Couch, 1844
- Tubulipora plumosa Thompson, 1898
- Tubulipora proteica Moyano, 1983
- Tubulipora pulchra MacGillivray, 1885
- Tubulipora pyriformis Canu & Bassler, 1929
- Tubulipora radiata Okada, 1917
- Tubulipora radicata Canu & Bassler, 1929
- Tubulipora rarofasciculata Canu & Lecointre, 1933
- Tubulipora samuelsoni Brood, 1980
- Tubulipora serpens Canu & Bassler, 1928
- Tubulipora similis Liu, 2001
- Tubulipora simplex (Römer, 1863)
- Tubulipora smitti Kluge, 1962
- Tubulipora soluta Kluge, 1946
- Tubulipora spatiosa Borg, 1944
- Tubulipora stellata Busk, 1886
- Tubulipora subdisticha Buge, 1950
- Tubulipora suberecta Brood, 1972
- Tubulipora tenuis Canu & Bassler, 1930
- Tubulipora trifaria Römer, 1852
- Tubulipora tuba (Gabb & Horn, 1862)
- Tubulipora tuboangusta Moyano, 1983
- Tubulipora tubolata Moyano, 1983
- Tubulipora uniformis Gostilovskaya, 1955
- Tubulipora varians Canu & Bassler, 1929
- Tubulipora ventricosa Busk, 1855
- Tubulipora verrucosa
- Tubulipora ziczac Harmelin, 1976
