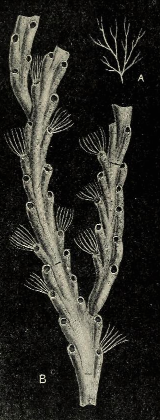
- Crisia denticulata

Scientific classification
- Domain: Eukaryota
- Kingdom: Animalia
- Phylum: Bryozoa
- Class: Stenolaemata
- Order: Cyclostomatida
- Suborder: Articulina

= Articulina =

Suborder of moss animals

Articulina is an extant suborder of bryozoans in the order Cyclostomatida.

Families in this suborder include:

- Crisiidae
- Crisuliporidae
