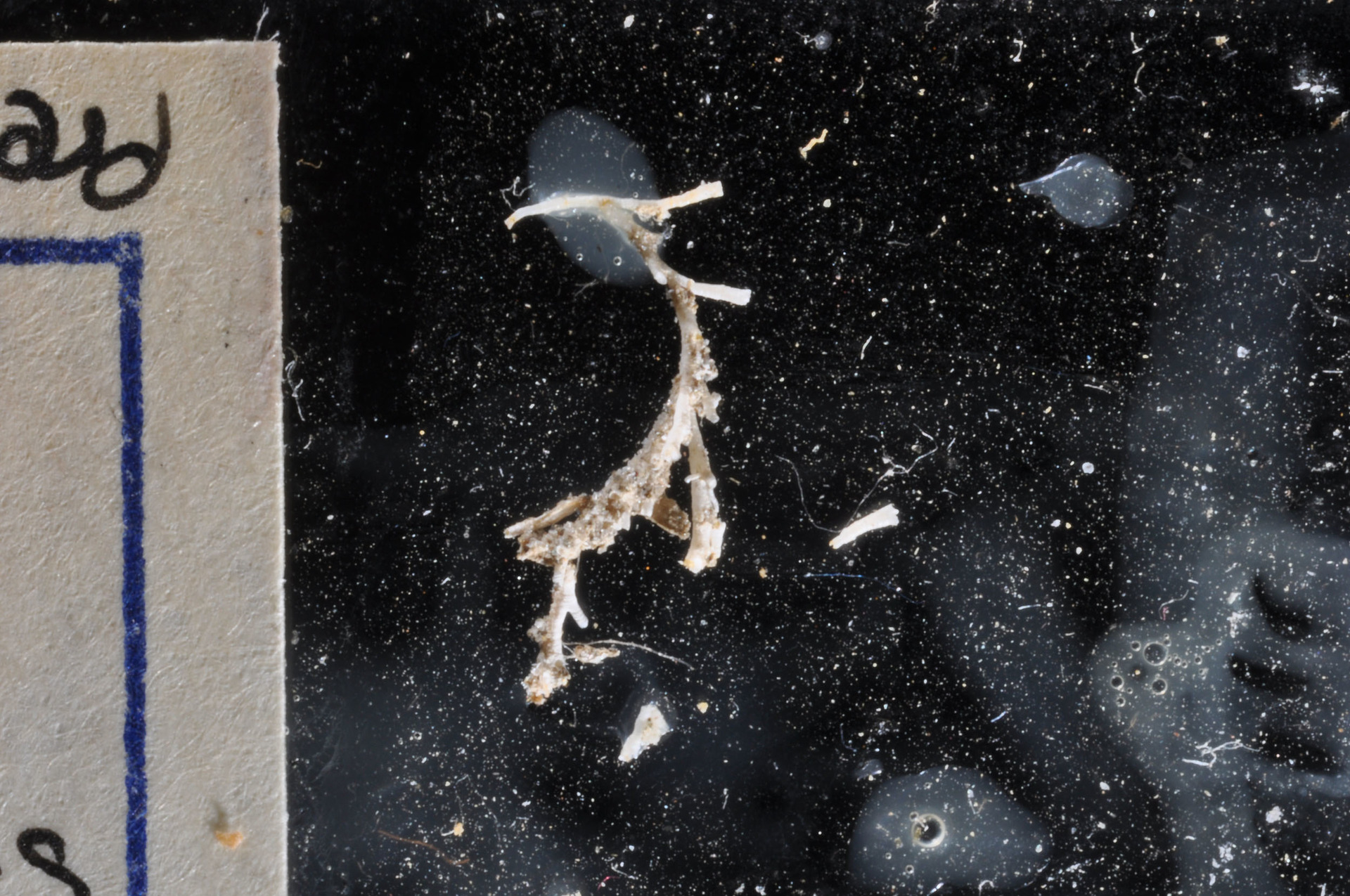
- Filicrisia sp.

Scientific classification
- Kingdom: Animalia
- Phylum: Bryozoa
- Class: Stenolaemata
- Order: Cyclostomatida
- Family: Crisiidae
- Genus: Filicrisia d'Orbigny, 1853

Type species
- Filicrisia geniculata (Milne Edwards, 1838)

= Filicrisia =

Genus of bryozoans

Filicrisia is a genus of bryozoans belonging to the family Crisiidae. It was first described in 1853 by Alcide d'Orbigny, and the type species is Filicrisia geniculata.

The genus has almost cosmopolitan distribution.

Species:

- Filicrisia allooeciata Liu, 2001
- Filicrisia franciscana (Robertson, 1910)
- Filicrisia geniculata (Milne Edwards, 1838)
- Filicrisia neocomiensis Voigt & Walter, 1991
- Filicrisia smitti (Kluge, 1946)
