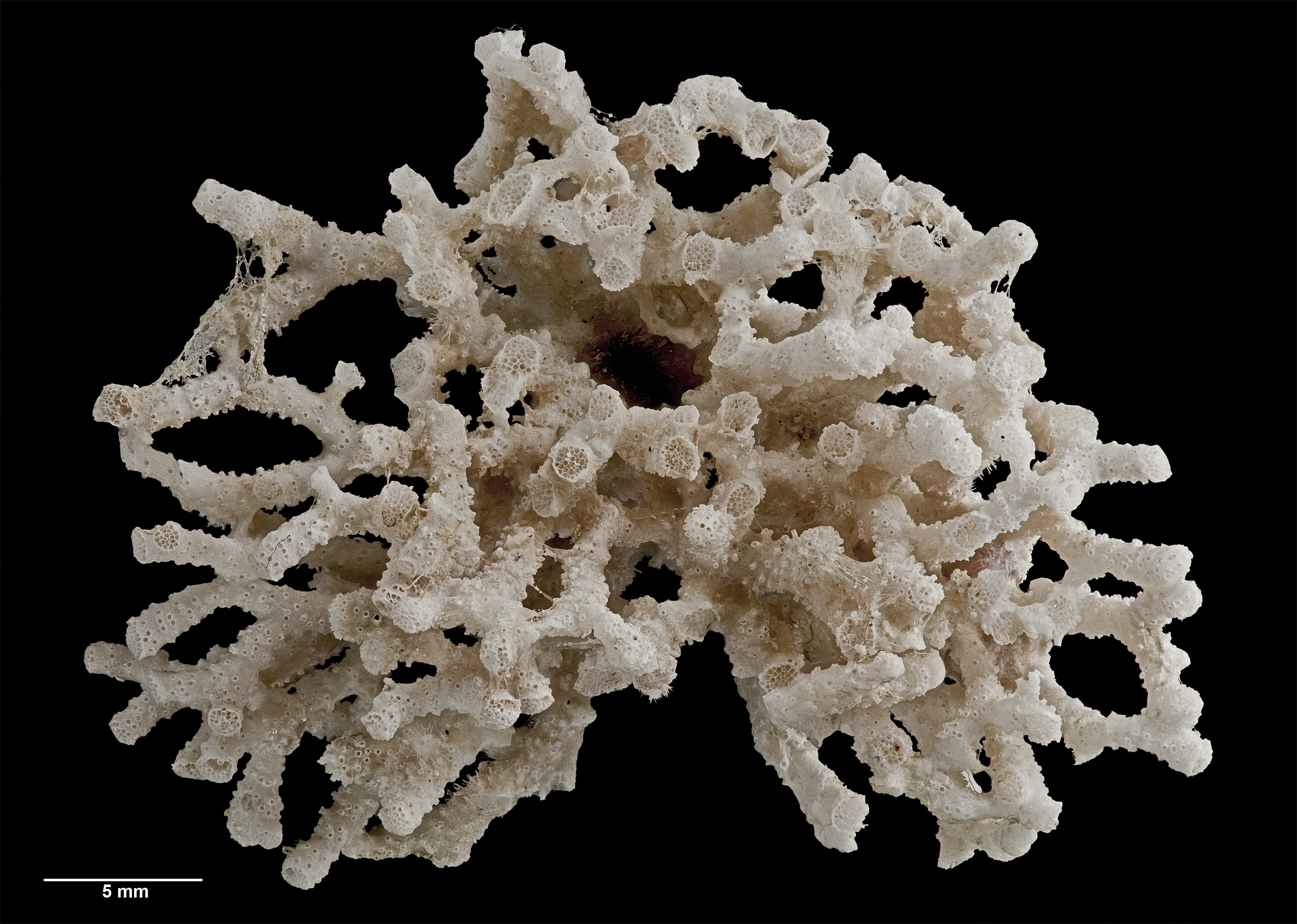
- Mecynoecia on the collections of the Auckland Museum.

Scientific classification
- Kingdom: Animalia
- Phylum: Bryozoa
- Class: Stenolaemata
- Order: Cyclostomatida
- Family: Entalophoridae
- Genus: Mecynoecia; Canu, 1918

= Mecynoecia =

Genus of bryozoans

Mecynoecia is a genus of bryozoans belonging to the family Entalophoridae.

The genus has almost cosmopolitan distribution.

Species:

- Mecynoecia angustata (d'Orbigny, 1851)
- Mecynoecia bajocina (d'Orbigny, 1850)
- Mecynoecia bellidis Winston & Jackson, 2021
- Mecynoecia benedeniana (von Hagenow, 1851)
- Mecynoecia brevicula Canu & Bassler, 1929
- Mecynoecia buskii (Borg, 1944)
- Mecynoecia carantina (d'Orbigny, 1853)
- Mecynoecia clavaeformis (Busk, 1875)
- Mecynoecia compressa Canu & Bassler, 1920
- Mecynoecia cornucopiae (d'Orbigny, 1851)
- Mecynoecia cornuta Canu & Bassler, 1920
- Mecynoecia cretacea (d'Orbigny, 1851)
- Mecynoecia cylindrica Canu & Bassler, 1920
- Mecynoecia dannevigi Chapman, 1941
- Mecynoecia delicatula (Busk, 1875)
- Mecynoecia elongatotuba Canu & Bassler, 1920
- Mecynoecia exterogemma Taylor & McKinney, 2006
- Mecynoecia filiformis (d'Orbigny, 1851)
- Mecynoecia geinitzi (Reuss, 1872)
- Mecynoecia geminata Canu & Bassler, 1929
- Mecynoecia globula Canu & Bassler, 1920
- Mecynoecia icaunensis (d'Orbigny, 1850)
- Mecynoecia iranensis (Balavoine, 1960)
- Mecynoecia kaimi Zatoń & Taylor, 2010
- Mecynoecia labiata (Römer, 1840-1841)
- Mecynoecia latedistans Voigt & Viaud, 1983
- Mecynoecia lobata Canu & Bassler, 1920
- Mecynoecia longipora (MacGillivray, 1895)
- Mecynoecia lunata Canu & Bassler, 1920
- Mecynoecia luvernensis Canu & Bassler, 1920
- Mecynoecia magnicella Canu & Bassler, 1920
- Mecynoecia montensis (Meunier & Pergens, 1886)
- Mecynoecia obesa Canu & Bassler, 1922
- Mecynoecia ovata Walter, 1987
- Mecynoecia parvituba Canu & Bassler, 1920
- Mecynoecia plauensis (Reuss, 1872)
- Mecynoecia proboscidea (Milne Edwards, 1838)
- Mecynoecia proboscideoides (Gabb & Horn, 1862)
- Mecynoecia pulchella (Reuss, 1848)
- Mecynoecia pusilla Canu & Bassler, 1920
- Mecynoecia quisenberryae Canu & Bassler, 1920
- Mecynoecia ramosissima (d'Orbigny, 1850)
- Mecynoecia rectangulata Canu & Bassler, 1929
- Mecynoecia repens O'Donoghue & O'Donoghue, 1926
- Mecynoecia rustica (von Hagenow, 1850)
- Mecynoecia semota Canu & Bassler, 1920
- Mecynoecia smitti (Pergens, 1887)
- Mecynoecia soror (Počta, 1892)
- Mecynoecia stipata Canu & Bassler, 1922
- Mecynoecia suprabajocina Hara & Taylor, 1996
- Mecynoecia tenuissima (Reuss, 1869)
- Mecynoecia thomasi Walter, 1969
