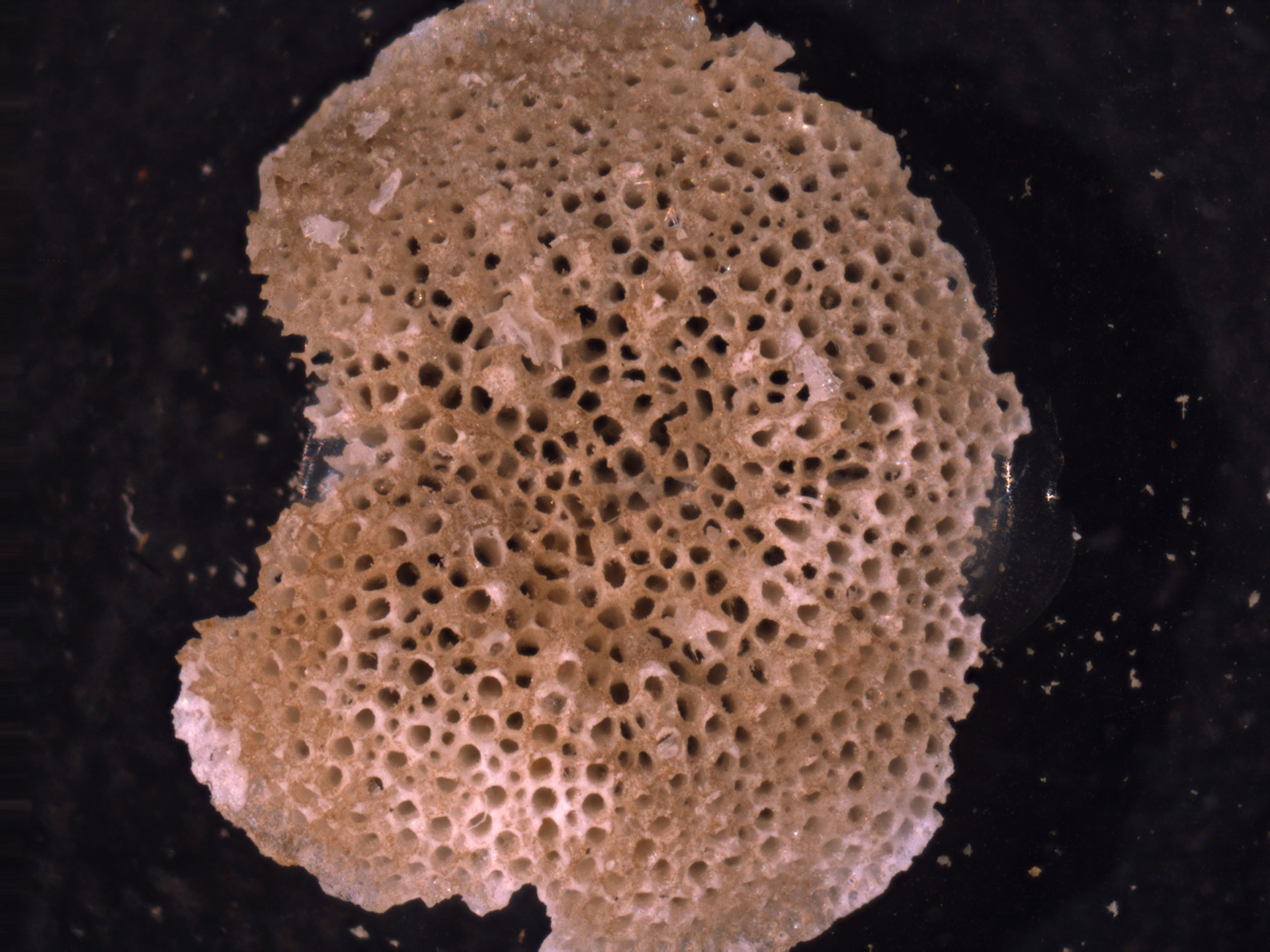
- Microslide of Borgella pustulosa

Scientific classification
- Kingdom: Animalia
- Phylum: Bryozoa
- Class: Stenolaemata
- Order: Cyclostomatida
- Family: Cerioporidae
- Genus: Borgella; Kluge, 1955
- Species: B. pustulosa

Binomial name
- Borgella pustulosa (Osburn, 1953)

= Borgella (genus) =

Genus of bryozoans

Borgella is a monotypic genus of bryozoans belonging to the family Cerioporidae. The only species is Borgella pustulosa.

The species is found in New Zealand.
