= Stomatoporidae =

Scientific classification
- Kingdom: Animalia
- Phylum: Bryozoa
- Class: Stenolaemata
- Order: Cyclostomatida
- Suborder: Tubuliporina
- Family: Stomatoporidae

Family of bryozoans

Stomatoporidae is a family of bryozoans belonging to the order Cyclostomatida.

== Genera ==
Genera:

- Guzhoviella Viskova, 2014
- Jullienipora Reverter-Gil & Fernandez-Pulpeiro, 2005
- Metastomatopora Moyano, 1991
- Peristomatopora Moyano, 1991
- Proboscinopora Pitt & Taylor, 1990
- Stomatopora Bronn, 1825
- Stomatoporina Balavoine, 1958
- Stomatoporopsis Illies, 1981
- Stoporatoma Viskova, 2006
- Tetrastomatopora Moyano, 1991
- Voigtopora Bassler, 1952
