= Hastingsia (bryozoan) =

Scientific classification
- Kingdom: Animalia
- Phylum: Bryozoa
- Class: Stenolaemata
- Order: Cyclostomatida
- Family: Hastingsiidae; Borg, 1944
- Genus: Hastingsia; Borg, 1944

Genus of bryozoans

Hastingsia is a genus of bryozoans belonging to the monotypic family Hastingsiidae.

The species of this genus are found in southernmost South Hemisphere.

Species:

- Hastingsia gracilis (MacGillivray, 1883)
- Hastingsia irregularis Borg, 1944
- Hastingsia pygmaea Borg, 1944
- Hastingsia whitteni Taylor, Waeschenbach, Smith & Gordon, 2015
