= Entalophora =

Scientific classification
- Kingdom: Animalia
- Phylum: Bryozoa
- Class: Stenolaemata
- Order: Cyclostomatida
- Family: Entalophoridae
- Genus: Entalophora; Lamouroux, 1821

Genus of bryozoans

Entalophora is a genus of bryozoans belonging to the family Entalophoridae.

The genus has cosmopolitan distribution.

== Species ==
Species:

- Entalophora arcuata Canu & Bassler, 1929
- Entalophora guangdongensis Yang & Lu, 1981
- Entalophora idmoneoides Calvet, 1903
- Entalophora symmetrica Osburn, 1953
- Entalophora unifasciata (Canu & Bassler, 1929)
