= Bereniceidae =

Scientific classification
- Kingdom: Animalia
- Phylum: Bryozoa
- Class: Stenolaemata
- Order: Cyclostomatida
- Family: Bereniceidae

Family of bryozoans

Bereniceidae is a family of bryozoans belonging to the order Cyclostomatida, possibly to the suborder Tubuliporina.

Genera:

- Berenicea Lamouroux, 1821
