= Plagioeciidae =

Plagioeciidae Temporal range: Middle Jurassic–Recent

Scientific classification
- Kingdom: Animalia
- Phylum: Bryozoa
- Class: Stenolaemata
- Order: Cyclostomatida
- Suborder: Tubuliporina
- Family: Plagioeciidae; Canu, 1918

Family of bryozoans

Plagioeciidae is a family of bryozoans, containing many genera once assigned to Diastoporidae. Extant representatives include Microecia.
