= Idmoneidae =

Scientific classification
- Kingdom: Animalia
- Phylum: Bryozoa
- Class: Stenolaemata
- Order: Cyclostomatida
- Family: Idmoneidae

Family of bryozoans

Idmoneidae is a family of bryozoans belonging to the order Cyclostomatida.

Genera:

- Castellia Viskova, 2004
- Idemona Viskova, 2004
- Idemonea Viskova, 2004
- Idmonea Lamouroux, 1821
- Lagonoecia Canu & Bassler, 1920
