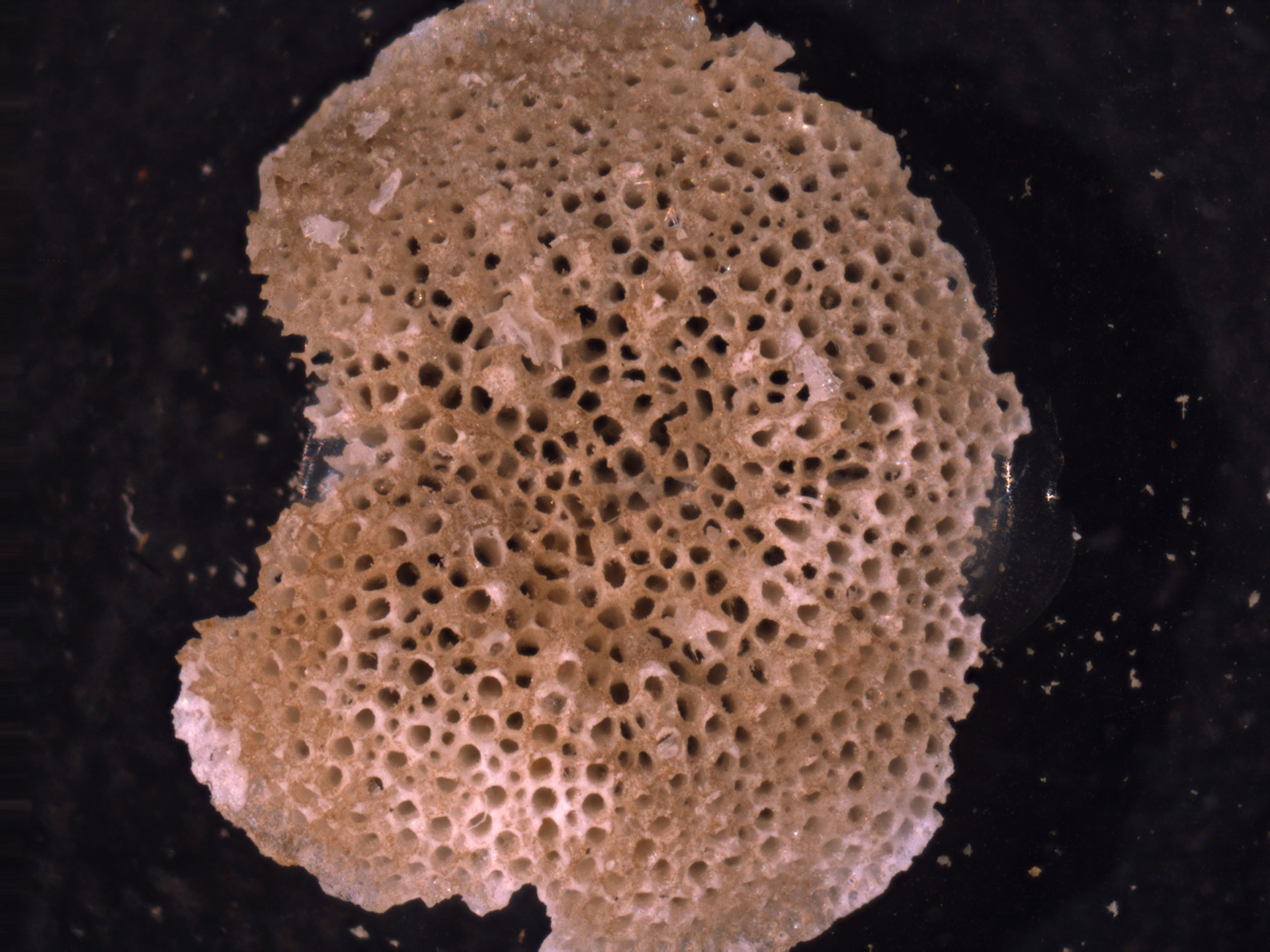
- Borgella pustulosa

Scientific classification
- Kingdom: Animalia
- Phylum: Bryozoa
- Class: Stenolaemata
- Order: Cyclostomatida
- Family: Cerioporidae; Busk, 1859

= Cerioporidae =

Family of bryozoans

Cerioporidae is a family of bryozoans belonging to the order Cyclostomatida.

== Genera ==
Genera:

- Acanthopora d'Orbigny, 1849
- Alveolaria Busk, 1859
- Biflabellaria Pergens, 1894
- Borgella
- Klugenotus
- Neofungella
- Telopora
- Tetrocycloecia
