= Diaperoeciidae =

Scientific classification
- Domain: Eukaryota
- Kingdom: Animalia
- Phylum: Bryozoa
- Class: Stenolaemata
- Order: Cyclostomatida
- Family: Diaperoeciidae

Family of bryozoans

Diaperoeciidae is a family of bryozoans belonging to the order Cyclostomatida.

Genera:

- Desmediaperoecia Canu & Bassler, 1920
- Diaperaecia Canu, 1918
- Diaperoecia Canu, 1918
- Nevianipora Borg, 1944
- Spiritopora Taylor & Gordon, 2003
- Ybselosoecia Canu & Lecointre, 1933
