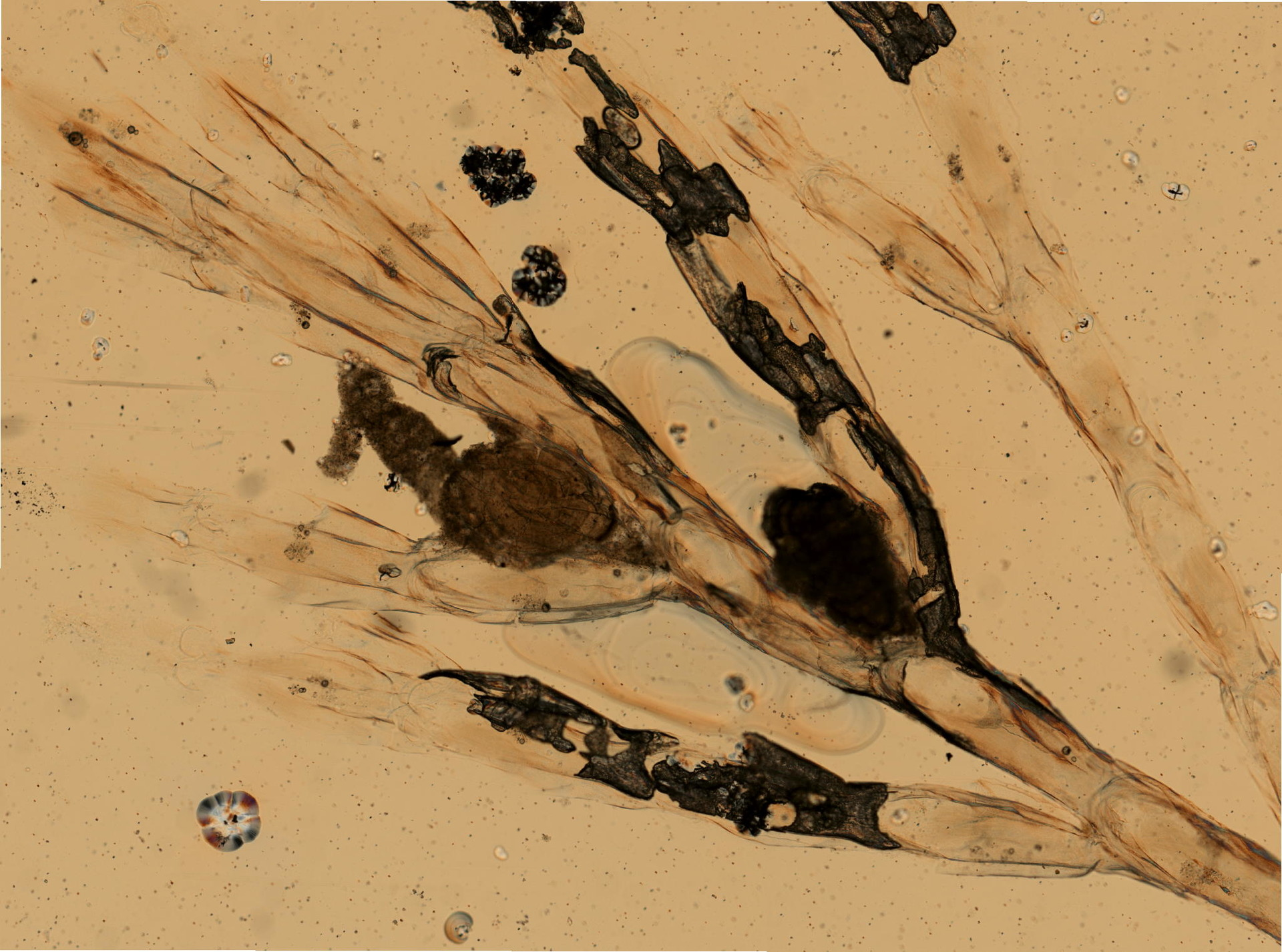
- Eucratea loricata

Scientific classification
- Kingdom: Animalia
- Phylum: Bryozoa
- Class: Gymnolaemata
- Order: Cheilostomatida
- Family: Eucrateidae
- Genus: Eucratea; Lamouroux, 1812

= Eucratea =

Genus of bryozoans

Eucratea is a genus of bryozoans belonging to the monotypic family Eucrateidae.

The species of this genus are found in Northern Hemisphere.

Species:

- Eucratea loricata (Linnaeus, 1758)
- Eucratea wallaysii Westendorp, 1843
