= Oncousoeciidae =

Scientific classification
- Kingdom: Animalia
- Phylum: Bryozoa
- Class: Stenolaemata
- Order: Cyclostomatida
- Family: Oncousoeciidae

Family of bryozoans

Oncousoeciidae is a family of bryozoans belonging to the order Cyclostomatida.

== Genera ==
Genera:

- Abyssoecia Grischenko, Gordon & Melnik, 2018
- Anguisia Jullien, 1882
- Axilosoecia Taylor & Brezina, 2018
- Filicisparsa Voigt, 1994
- Filisparsa d'Orbigny, 1853
- Foliopora Brood, 1977
- Hemipustulopora Brood, 1976
- Leptopora d'Orbigny, 1849
- Microeciella Taylor & Sequeiros, 1982
- Oncousoecia Canu, 1918
- Paulella Gontar, 2009
- Proboscina Audouin, 1826
