= Petaloporidae =

Scientific classification
- Kingdom: Animalia
- Phylum: Bryozoa
- Class: Stenolaemata
- Order: Cyclostomatida
- Family: Petaloporidae

Family of marine bryozoans

Petaloporidae is a family of bryozoans belonging to the order Cyclostomatida.

== Genera ==
Genera:

- Cavarinella Marsson, 1887
- Choristopetalum Lonsdale, 1849
- Coelocochlea von Hagenow, 1851
