= Pustuloporidae =

Scientific classification
- Domain: Eukaryota
- Kingdom: Animalia
- Phylum: Bryozoa
- Class: Stenolaemata
- Order: Cyclostomatida
- Family: Pustuloporidae

Family of bryozoans

Pustuloporidae is a family of bryozoans belonging to the order Cyclostomatida.

Genera:

- Bientalophora Borg, 1944
- Pustulopora de Blainville, 1830
- Umbrellina Reuss, 1872
