= Crisuliporidae =

Scientific classification
- Domain: Eukaryota
- Kingdom: Animalia
- Phylum: Bryozoa
- Class: Stenolaemata
- Order: Cyclostomatida
- Family: Crisuliporidae

Family of bryozoans

Crisuliporidae is a family of bryozoans belonging to the order Cyclostomatida.

Genera:

- Crisulipora Robertson, 1910
