= Annectocymidae =

Scientific classification
- Kingdom: Animalia
- Phylum: Bryozoa
- Class: Stenolaemata
- Order: Cyclostomatida
- Family: Annectocymidae

Family of bryozoans

Annectocymidae is a family of bryozoans belonging to the order Cyclostomatida.

Genera:

- Annectocyma Hayward & Ryland, 1985
- Entalophoroecia Harmelin, 1976
