= Stigmatoechidae =

Scientific classification
- Kingdom: Animalia
- Phylum: Bryozoa
- Class: Stenolaemata
- Order: Cyclostomatida
- Family: Stigmatoechidae

Family of bryozoans

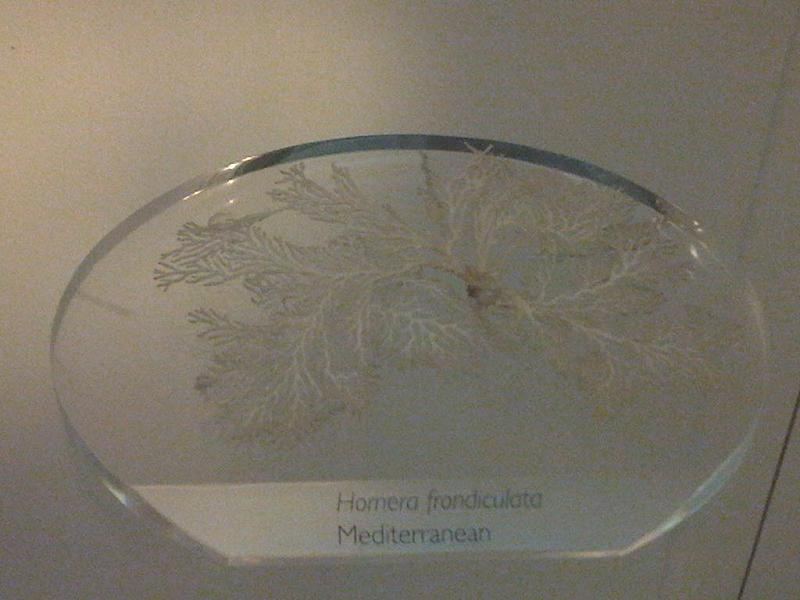
A specimen of Hornera frondiculata on display at the Natural History Museum in London, England

Stigmatoechidae is a family of bryozoans belonging to the order Cyclostomatida.

Genera:

- Hornera Lamouroux, 1821
- Stigmatoechos Marsson, 1887
