= Entalophoridae =

Scientific classification
- Kingdom: Animalia
- Phylum: Bryozoa
- Class: Stenolaemata
- Order: Cyclostomatida
- Family: Entalophoridae

Family of bryozoans

Entalophoridae is a family of bryozoans belonging to the order Cyclostomatida.

== Genera ==
Genera:

- †Bicoronipora Walter, 1987
- Bisidmonea d'Orbigny, 1853
- †Brachysoecia Canu & Bassler, 1922
- †Clavisparsa d'Orbigny, 1853
- †Clypeina Michelin, 1844
- Entalophora Lamouroux, 1821
- †Exochoecia Canu & Bassler, 1920
- Mecynoecia Canu, 1918
- †Nematifera Canu & Bassler, 1922
- †Pergensia Walford, 1894
