= Scrupariidae =

Scientific classification
- Kingdom: Animalia
- Phylum: Bryozoa
- Class: Gymnolaemata
- Order: Cheilostomatida
- Suborder: Scrupariina
- Family: Scrupariidae

Synonyms
- Scupariadae

Family of bryozoans

Scrupariidae is a family of bryozoans belonging to the order Cheilostomatida.

Genera:

- Brettiopsis López Gappa, 1986
- Scruparia Oken, 1815
