= Pseudidmonea =

Scientific classification
- Kingdom: Animalia
- Phylum: Bryozoa
- Class: Stenolaemata
- Order: Cyclostomatida
- Family: Pseudidmoneidae; Borg, 1944
- Genus: Pseudidmonea; Borg, 1944

Genus of bryozoans

Pseudidmonea is a genus of bryozoans belonging to the monotypic family Pseudidmoneidae.

The species of this genus are found in Southern Hemisphere.

Species:

- Pseudidmonea fissurata (Busk, 1886)
- Pseudidmonea gracilis Androsova, 1968
- Pseudidmonea johnsoni Di Martino & Taylor, 2014
