= Crisinidae =

Scientific classification
- Kingdom: Animalia
- Phylum: Bryozoa
- Class: Stenolaemata
- Order: Cyclostomatida
- Family: Crisinidae d'Orbigny, 1853

Family of bryozoans

Crisinidae is a family of bryozoans belonging to the order Cyclostomatida. The family was established by French naturalist Alcide d'Orbigny in 1853.

== Description ==
Members of Crisinidae have calcified colonies with tubular zooids. The family exhibits encrusting, mound, and erect branching forms. Like other members of the order Cyclostomatida, the zooids have terminal orifices for lophophore protrusion.

The form taken by bryozoan colonies can be highly variable, from gelatinous blobs to upright branching structures and sheet-like encrusters. Erect branching colonies have branches that are roughly circular in cross section. Individual zooids, the microscopic units that make up the colony, are typically arranged along the branches of the colony structure.

Like all bryozoans, members of this family strain food out of the water by means of a lophophore, a "crown" of hollow tentacles.

== Distribution and habitat ==
Crisinidae species are marine organisms found in various ocean habitats. Most marine bryozoan species live in tropical waters at depths less than 100 meters, however, a few have been found in deep-sea trenches and others near the poles.

== Genera ==
The World Register of Marine Species currently recognizes five genera in Crisinidae:

   Biidmonea Calvet, 1903
   Crisidmonea Marsson, 1887
   Crisina d'Orbigny, 1853 – type genus
   Mesonea Canu & Bassler, 1920
   Polyascosoeciella Taylor & McKinney, 1996 (synonym of Crisidmonea)

Additionally, several fossil genera have been described, including Bicrisina, Bitubigera, Brestopora, Centronea, Clavicava, Clavitubigera, Diplopetalopora, Pseudotervia, and Reteporidea.
