= Calvetiidae =

Scientific classification
- Domain: Eukaryota
- Kingdom: Animalia
- Phylum: Bryozoa
- Class: Stenolaemata
- Order: Cyclostomatida
- Family: Calvetiidae

Family of bryozoans

Calvetiidae is a family of bryozoans belonging to the order Cyclostomatida.

Genera:

- Calvetia Borg, 1944
