= Cinctiporidae =

Scientific classification
- Kingdom: Animalia
- Phylum: Bryozoa
- Class: Stenolaemata
- Order: Cyclostomatida
- Suborder: Tubuliporina
- Family: Cinctiporidae; Boardman, Taylor & McKinney, 1992

Genera
- Attinopora†; Cinctipora; Cylindropora; Semicinctipora

Family of bryozoans

Cinctiporidae is a bryozoan family in the order Cyclostomatida.
