= Actinopora =

Scientific classification
- Kingdom: Animalia
- Phylum: Bryozoa
- Class: Phylactolaemata
- Order: Plumatellida
- Family: Plumatellidae
- Genus: Actinopora d'Orbigny, 1853

Genus of bryozoans

Actinopora is a genus of bryozoans belonging to the family Plumatellidae.

The species of this genus are found in Europe.

== Species ==
Species:

- Actinopora armorica (Michelin, 1847)
- Actinopora auei Voigt, 1996
- Actinopora bowerbanki (Haime, 1854)
- Actinopora brevis Canu & Bassler, 1920
- Actinopora brongniarti (Milne-Edwards, 1837)
- Actinopora campicheana (d'Orbigny, 1853)
- Actinopora complicata Viskova & Endelman, 1971
- Actinopora conjuncta (Michelin, 1847)
- Actinopora convexa (Römer, 1840)
- Actinopora erecta (Brood, 1972)
- Actinopora excavata (d'Orbigny, 1851)
- Actinopora gregaria (d'Orbigny, 1850)
- Actinopora incrassata Canu, 1911
- Actinopora japonica Canu & Bassler, 1929
- Actinopora moneta (d'Orbigny, 1853)
- Actinopora multipora Römer, 1863
- Actinopora philippinensis Canu & Bassler, 1929
- Actinopora plana Römer, 1863
- Actinopora plicata Canu, 1916
- Actinopora radiata (Woodward, 1833)
- Actinopora regularis Gregory, 1909
- Actinopora robertsoniana Canu, 1911
- Actinopora rugosa (Canu & Lecointre, 1933)
- Actinopora stellata (Koch & Dunker, 1837)
- Actinopora striata Canu, 1911
- Actinopora sulcata (Gregory, 1909)
- Actinopora tenuissima Canu & Bassler, 1920
