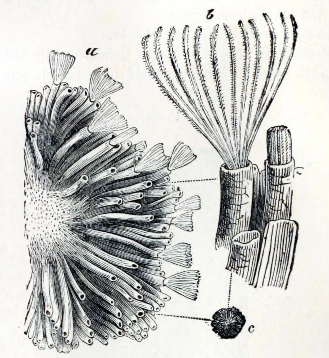
- Diagram of Tubulipora flabellaris

Scientific classification
- Kingdom: Animalia
- Phylum: Bryozoa
- Class: Stenolaemata
- Order: Cyclostomatida
- Family: Tubuliporidae

= Tubuliporidae =

Family of bryozoans

Tubuliporidae is a family of bryozoans belonging to the order Cyclostomatida.

== Genera ==
- Bathysoecia Osburn, 1953
- Biovicella Mongereau, 1970
- Buglovella Ponomareva, 1975
- Coronidmonea Voigt, 1975
- Tennysonia Busk, 1867
- Tretonea Canu & Bassler, 1920
- Tubulipora Lamarck, 1816
- Zagorsekia Gordon & Taylor, 2015
