= Diastoporidae =

Scientific classification
- Kingdom: Animalia
- Phylum: Bryozoa
- Class: Stenolaemata
- Order: Cyclostomatida
- Family: Diastoporidae

Family of bryozoans

Diastoporidae is a family of bryozoans belonging to the order Cyclostomatida.

Genera:

- Bidiastopora
- Clinopora Marsson, 1887
- Discosparsa d'Orbigny, 1853
- Fascipora d'Orbigny, 1853
- Microecia
