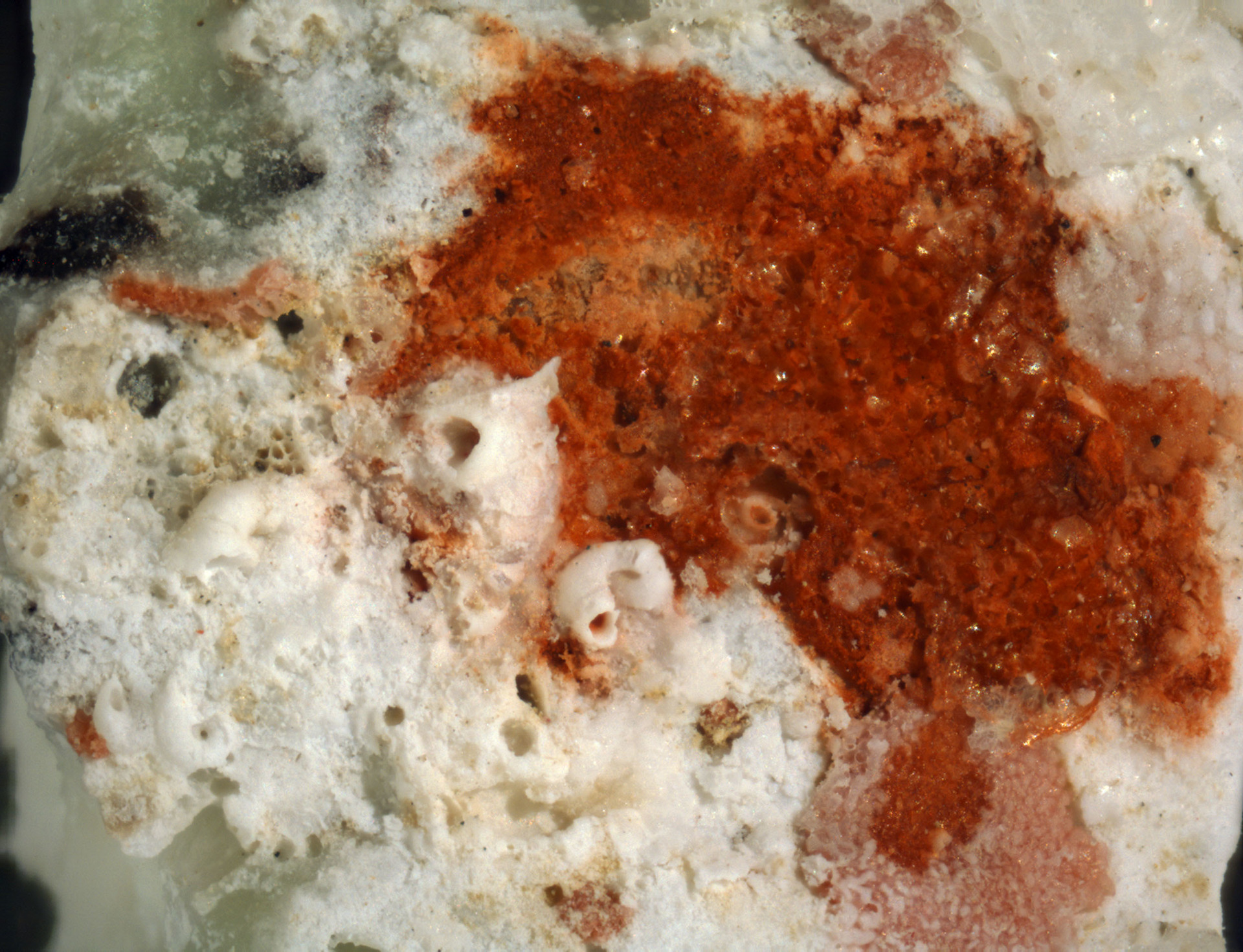

Scientific classification
- Kingdom: Animalia
- Phylum: Bryozoa
- Class: Stenolaemata
- Order: Cyclostomatida
- Family: Lichenoporidae

Synonyms
- Disporellidae; Radioporidae

= Lichenoporidae =

Family of bryozoans

Lichenoporidae is a family of bryozoans belonging to the order Cyclostomatida. The Lichenoporidae family is characterized by its distinctive lichen-like appearance and is closely related to other bryozoan families, such as the Membraniporidae and Bugulidae.

== Habitat ==
Lichenoporidae are primarily found in marine environments, inhabiting shallow coastal waters to deeper oceanic zones. They can be found in various substrates, including hard surfaces like rocks and coral, as well as softer sediments. Some species are also capable of surviving in brackish waters.

== Genera ==
Genera:

- Actinotaxia Hamm, 1881
- Bimulticavea d'Orbigny, 1853
- Camerapora Meunier & Pergens, 1885
