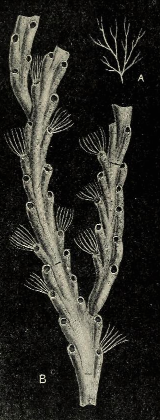
- Crisia denticulata

Scientific classification
- Kingdom: Animalia
- Phylum: Bryozoa
- Class: Stenolaemata
- Order: Cyclostomatida
- Suborder: Articulina
- Family: Crisiidae; Johnston, 1838

Genera
- Bicrisia; Crisevia; Crisia; Crisidia; Crisiella; Crisiona; Filicrisia; †Unicrisia

= Crisiidae =

Family of moss animals

Crisiidae is a family of bryozoans in the suborder Articulina.
