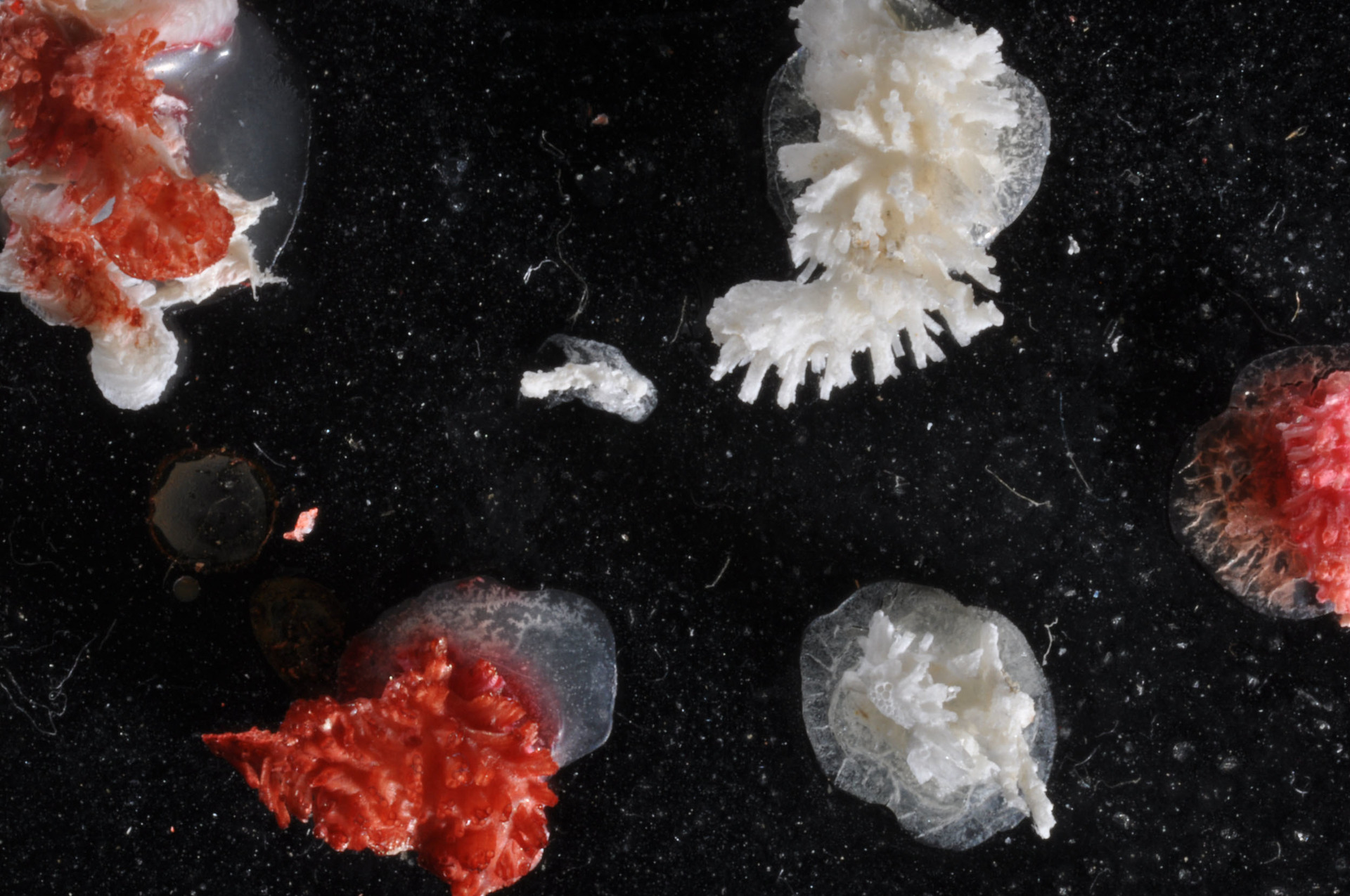
- Tubulipora flabellaris

Scientific classification
- Kingdom: Animalia
- Phylum: Bryozoa
- Class: Stenolaemata
- Order: Cyclostomatida

Subgroups
- See List of Cyclostomatida families.

= Cyclostomatida =

Cyclostomatida Temporal range: Lower Ordovician–Recent

Order of moss animals

Cyclostomatida, or cyclostomata (also known as cyclostomes), are an ancient order of stenolaemate bryozoans which first appeared in the Lower Ordovician. It consists of 7+ suborders, 59+ families, 373+ genera, and 666+ species. The cyclostome bryozoans were dominant in the Mesozoic; since that era, they have decreased. Currently, cyclostomes seldom constitute more than 20% of the species recorded in regional bryozoan faunas.

== Taxonomy ==
Traditionally, cyclostomes have been divided into two groups according to the skeletal organization. In free-walled (or double-walled) cyclostomes, the exterior frontal walls of the zooids are uncalcified; autozooids have either a polygonal aperture bounded by vertical interior walls, or a subcircular aperture in species with kenozooids filling the spaces between the autozooids. By contrast, fixed-walled (or single-walled) cyclostomes have much of the exterior frontal wall calcified; autozooids normally have a subcircular aperture located at or close to the frontal wall.

== Anatomy ==
Among cyclostome bryozoans, the calcitic skeleton is usually lamellar, consisting of tabular or lath-like crystallites stacked like tiles at a low angle to the wall surface. Cheilostome bryozoans may exhibit a similar ultrastructure but more commonly have fibrous skeletons consisting of needle-like or bladed crystallites oriented almost perpendicular to wall surfaces.

The skeletal parts of individual feeding zooids — autozooecia — are typically long, curved tubes with terminal apertures which are either circular or polygonal in shape. Colonies vary greatly in form according to species. Many cyclostomes have encrusting colonies, firmly cemented to hard substrates such as rocks and shells. These usually grow as subcircular sheets, spots or pimples, or systems of ramifying branches. Most erect cyclostomes develop bushy colonies with narrow, bifurcating branches. Feeding zooids are borne either evenly around the branch circumference or are absent from one face. New zooids are generally formed in distinct budding zones, for example, around the outer circumference of subcircular encrusting colonies, or at the tips of the branches in ramifying encrusting and bushy erect colonies.

All post-Palaeozoic cyclostomes have interzooidal connections via pores in the vertical walls separating adjacent zooids. In the fixed-walled forms, these narrow pores constitute the only coelomic connection, because the vertical walls contact and fuse with the calcified, exterior frontal walls. However, in free-walled forms, the frontal walls are uncalcified, and no contact is made with the vertical walls, creating a wider coelomic connection around the distal ends of the vertical walls.

Polymorphism of zooids is less conspicuous than in cheilostomes. However, almost all cyclostome species have enlarged zooids - gonozooids - for brooding larvae, and some species also possess non-feeding zooids - kenozooids - with space-filling and structural roles. Modern cyclostomes exhibit polyembryony: fertilized ova divide to produce multiple, genetically identical larvae which are housed in the spacious gonozooid before being released, swimming for a short period before settling and undergoing metamorphosis to establish new clonal colonies. Gonozooids are also very important in the taxonomy of cyclostomes, particularly in the largest suborder the Tubuliporina. Unfortunately, not all colonies develop gonozooids and infertile colonies may be difficult to identify even to family-level.

== Differentiation ==
A colony is founded by a larva which settles and metamorphoses into a zooid, the ancestrula. In Cyclostomata it may be of two types: holoancestrula and artroancenstrula (in crisiids) The ancestrula gives rise to the second generation of zooids, which in turn gives rise to a third, and so on, in a process called astogeny. Generational variation among zooids is called astogenetic differentiation. In all species, there is a primary zone of differentiation, which is limited to the first few generations and followed by a much longer zone of repetition of nearly identical zooids. In some species, however, there is a secondary differentiated zone, which can take various forms. In species in which the colony branches, new branches normally arise by the division of a distal growing tip of an existing branch. An adventitious branch, in contrast, arises from the side of an existing branch, beginning with a short series of differentiated zooids, a secondary zone. Subsequent generations of zooids along the branch then typically return to the normal colony budding pattern.

== Ecology ==
At the present day cyclostome bryozoans are exclusively marine and stenohaline, with most species living subtidally on the continental shelf. UK government-sponsored scientific reports in connection with renewable energy in 2014 uncovered the first recordings of Escharoides bishopi and the non-native Fenestrulina delicia in British waters. Relative to cheilostomes, they appear to be less numerous and diverse in low latitudes — temperate and arctic environments host almost all of the large species. Although some cyclostomes encrust fleshy algae, the majority colonize hard substrates. Encrusting species can be especially numerous in cryptic habitats, for example, the concave interiors of bivalve shells. Cyclostomes are comparatively poor competitors for living space - they are routinely overgrown by larger animals such as sponges and ascidians, and also lose the majority of competitive encounters for space with cheilostome bryozoans. Tentacle size and number tend to be smaller in species of cyclostomes than cheilostomes. As a result, cyclostomes create less powerful feeding currents. Colony size is small in many encrusting species, suggesting a "weedy", opportunistic lifestyle. These small encrusting colonies probably live for less than a year, whereas some of the larger encrusting and erect colonies are undoubtedly perennials. However, scant data exists on growth rates in cyclostomes.

Little is known about predation specifically on cyclostomes although it is likely that they are preyed upon by the nudibranchs (sea-slugs), pycnogonids (sea-spiders), echinoids and fishes which consume other marine bryozoans. Little is known about the reproductive ecology of cyclostomes. Sperm are known to be released from the tips of the tentacles, as in other bryozoans, but fertilization of eggs has never been observed. It is unclear if each gonozooid broods single or multiple clutches of larvae, whether one or more clones of polyembryonous larvae are present per gonozooid, and what is the duration of the brooding period.
