= Schizotheca =

Schizotheca may refer to:

- Schizotheca (bryozoan), a genus of bryozoans in the family Phidoloporidae
- Schizotheca, a genus of plants in the family Hydrocharitaceae, considered synonymous with Thalassia
- Schizotheca, an illegitimate name for a genus of plants in the family Amaranthaceae, considered synonymous with Atriplex
