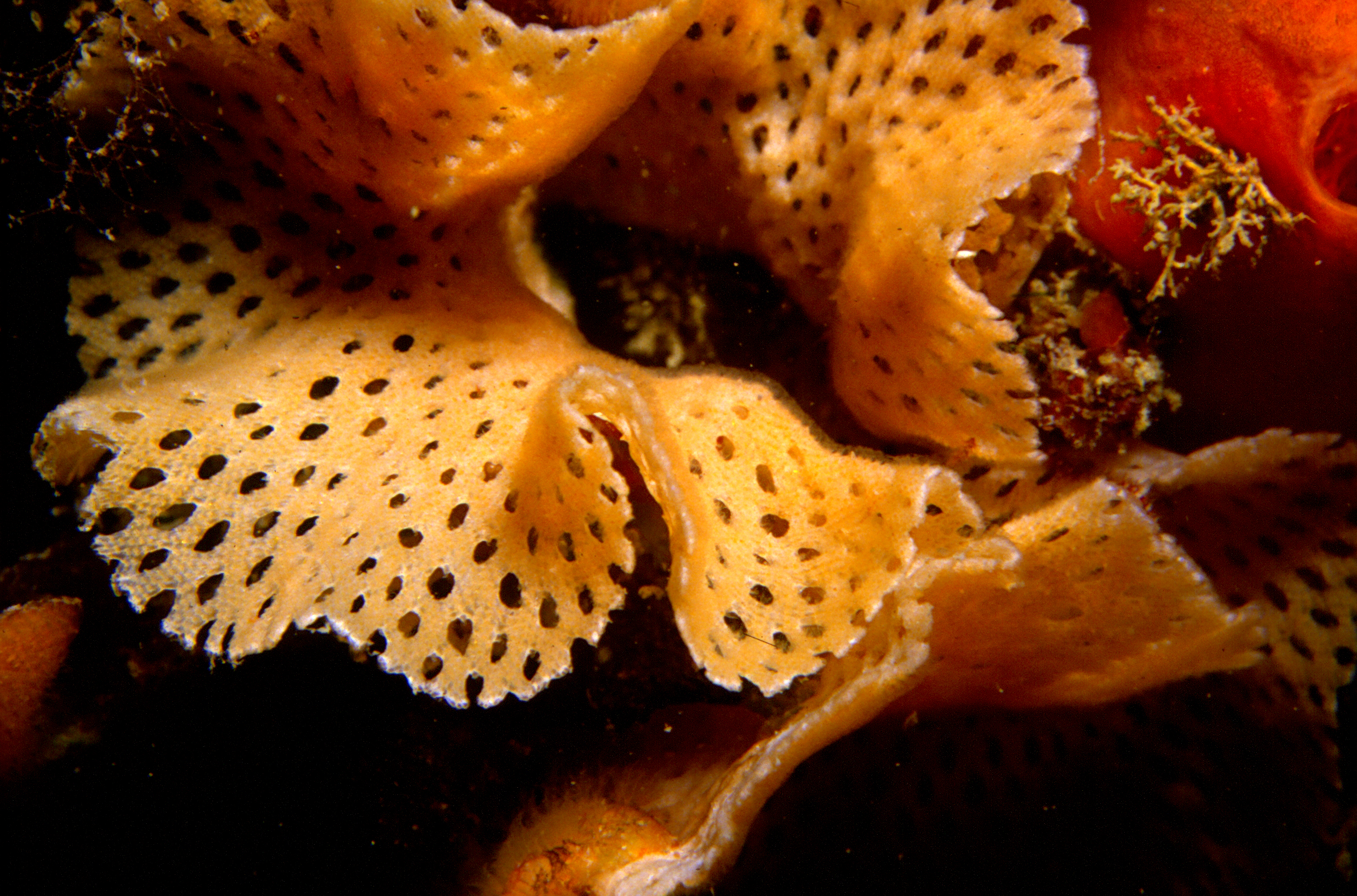

Scientific classification
- Kingdom: Animalia
- Phylum: Bryozoa
- Class: Gymnolaemata
- Order: Cheilostomatida
- Family: Phidoloporidae
- Genus: Reteporella
- Species: R. grimaldii

Binomial name
- Reteporella grimaldii (Jullien, 1903)

= Reteporella grimaldii =

Species of moss animal

Reteporella grimaldii is a species of bryozoans in the family Phidoloporidae.
