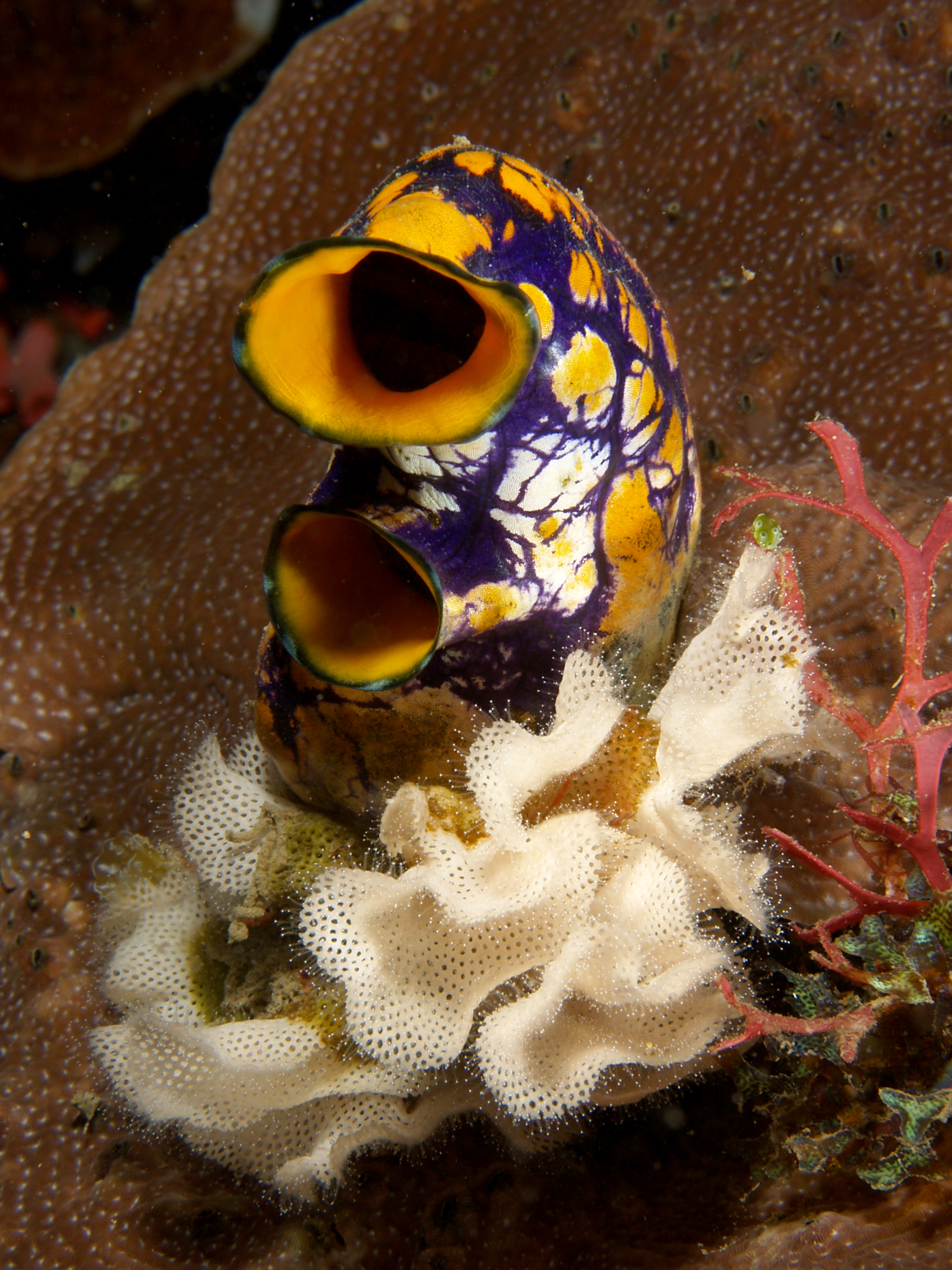
- The white Triphyllozoon inornatum and the multicolored tunicate Polycarpa aurata

Scientific classification
- Kingdom: Animalia
- Phylum: Bryozoa
- Class: Gymnolaemata
- Order: Cheilostomatida
- Family: Phidoloporidae
- Genus: Triphyllozoon
- Species: T. inornatum

Binomial name
- Triphyllozoon inornatum Harmer, 1934

= Triphyllozoon inornatum =

Species of moss animal

Triphyllozoon inornatum is a species of bryozoa in the family Phidoloporidae.
