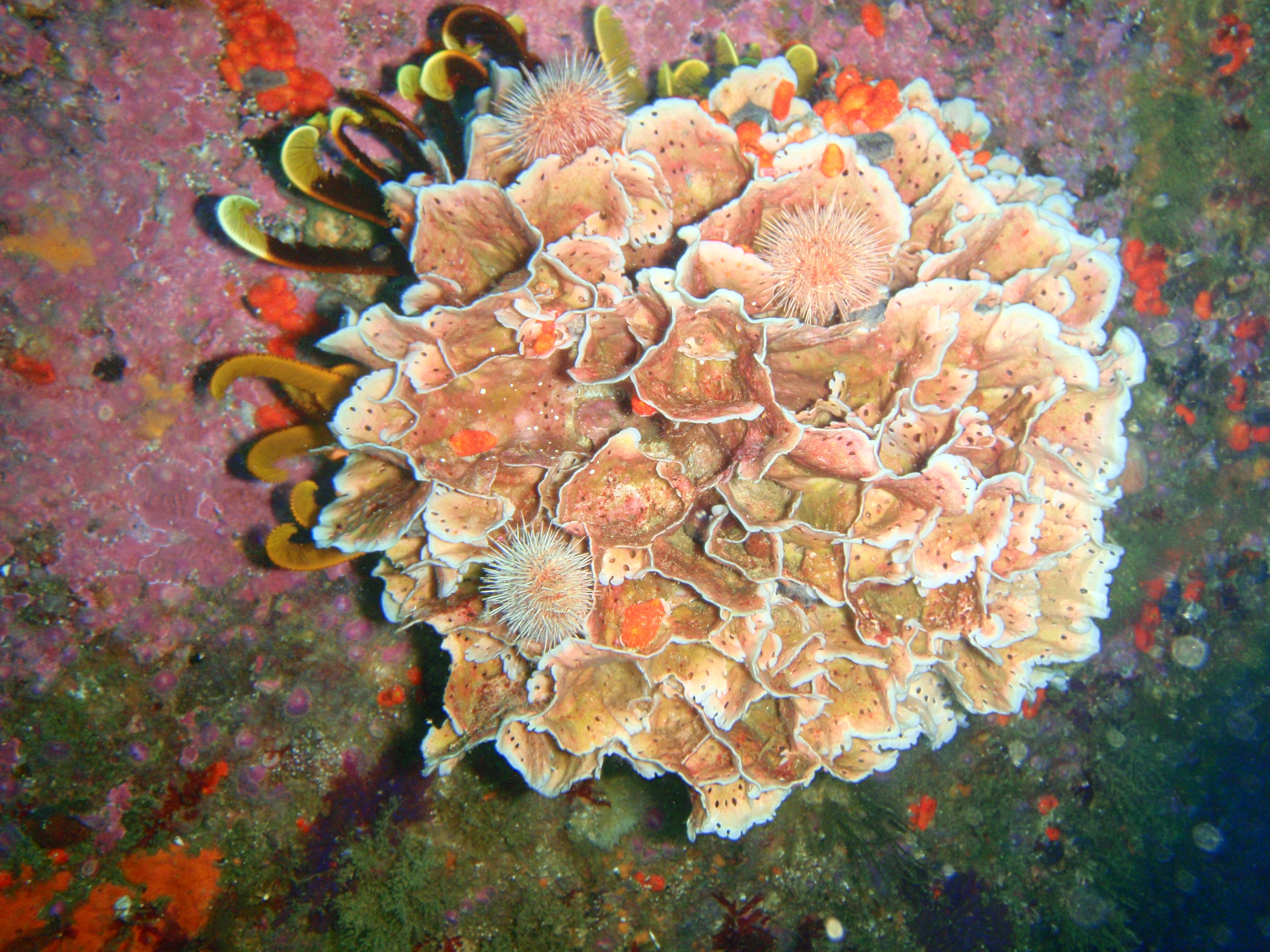
- Schizoretepora tessellata

Scientific classification
- Kingdom: Animalia
- Phylum: Bryozoa
- Class: Gymnolaemata
- Order: Cheilostomatida
- Family: Phidoloporidae
- Genus: Schizoretepora; Gregory, 1893

= Schizoretepora =

Genus of bryozoans

Schizoretepora is a genus of bryozoans belonging to the family Phidoloporidae.

The genus has almost cosmopolitan distribution.

Species:

- Schizoretepora aviculifera (Canu & Bassler, 1930)
- Schizoretepora calveti d'Hondt, 1975
- Schizoretepora dentata (Calvet, 1931)
- Schizoretepora elongata (Canu & Bassler, 1928)
- Schizoretepora fungosa (Canu & Lecointre, 1930)
- Schizoretepora hamzai El Safori & El-Sorogy, 1999
- Schizoretepora hassi Harmelin, Bitar & Zibrowius, 2007
- Schizoretepora imperati Busk, 1884
- Schizoretepora irregularis (Vigneaux, 1949)
- Schizoretepora lutea (Canu & Bassler, 1929)
- Schizoretepora moharramii Abbas & El-Senoussi, 1979
- Schizoretepora pungens (Canu & Bassler, 1925)
- Schizoretepora robusta Hayward, 2000
- Schizoretepora serratimargo (Hincks, 1886)
- Schizoretepora solanderia (Risso, 1827)
- Schizoretepora tamagawensis Zágoršek, Takashima & Hirose, 2015
- Schizoretepora tessellata (Hincks, 1878)
- Schizoretepora tumescens (Ortmann, 1890)
- Schizoretepora vigneauxi Souaya, 1965
