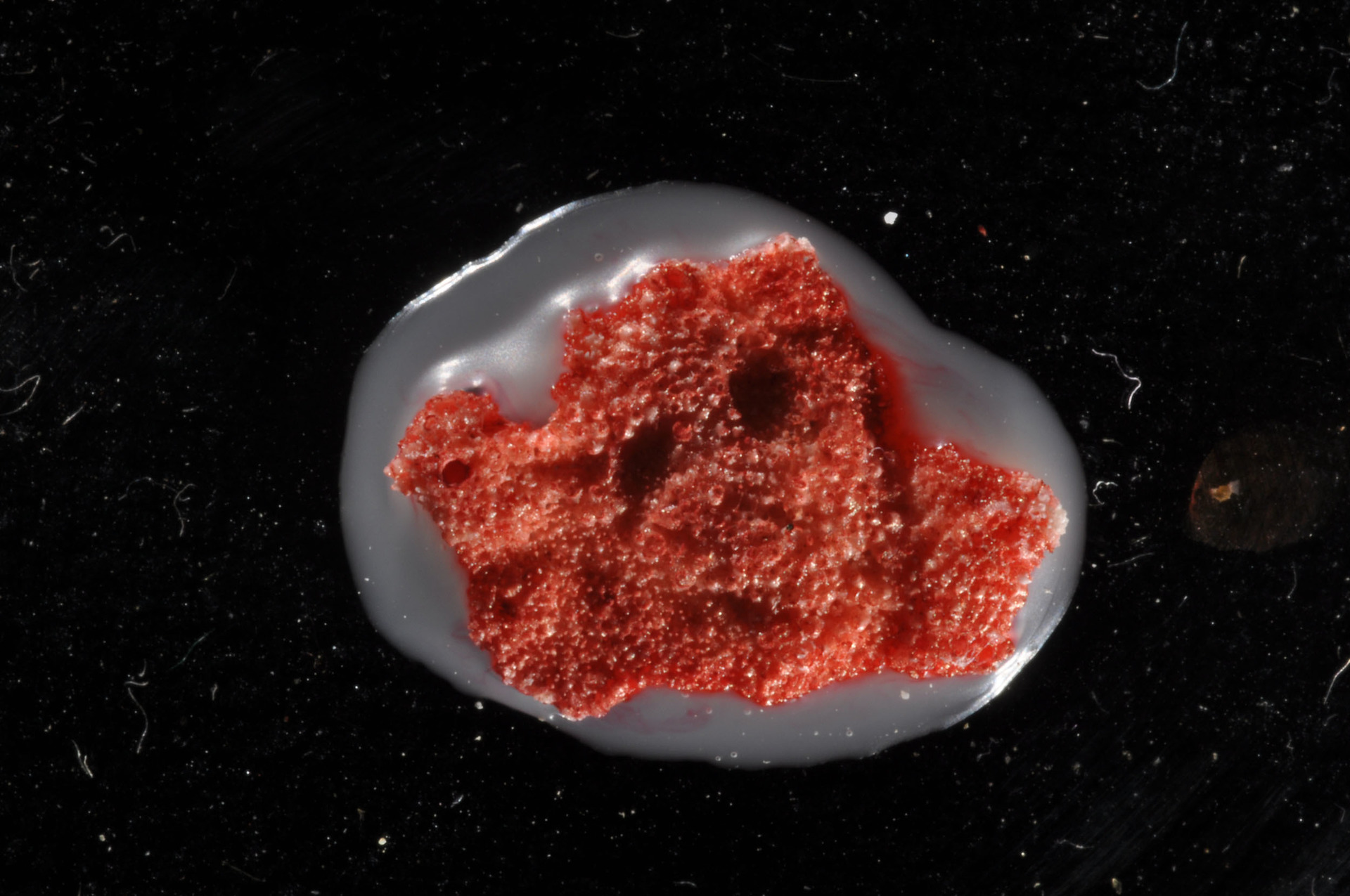
- Rhynchozoon sp.

Scientific classification
- Kingdom: Animalia
- Phylum: Bryozoa
- Class: Gymnolaemata
- Order: Cheilostomatida
- Family: Phidoloporidae
- Genus: Rhynchozoon; Hincks, 1895

= Rhynchozoon =

Genus of bryozoans

Rhynchozoon is a genus of bryozoans belonging to the family Phidoloporidae.

The genus has almost cosmopolitan distribution.

Species:

- Rhynchozoon abscondum Florence, Hayward & Gibbons, 2007
- Rhynchozoon adamanteus Tilbrook, 2006
- Rhynchozoon angulatum Levinsen, 1909
- Rhynchozoon ardeolum Ryland & Hayward, 1992
- Rhynchozoon attina Tilbrook, 2006
- Rhynchozoon beatulum Hayward & Cook, 1983
- Rhynchozoon bifurcum Harmer, 1957
- Rhynchozoon bispinosum (Johnston, 1847)
- Rhynchozoon brasiliensis Almeida, Souza, Menegola & Vieira, 2017
- Rhynchozoon capoblanquense Weisbord, 1967
- Rhynchozoon caribense Weisbord, 1967
- Rhynchozoon celestinoi Souto, Reverter-Gil & Fernández-Pulpeiro, 2010
- Rhynchozoon coalitum Vieira, Gordon, Souza & Haddad, 2010
- Rhynchozoon compactum (Thornely, 1905)
- Rhynchozoon complanatum (Maplestone, 1913)
- Rhynchozoon confusum (Calvet, 1906)
- Rhynchozoon corniculatum (Maplestone, 1909)
- Rhynchozoon corniger Canu & Bassler, 1928
- Rhynchozoon crenulatum (Waters, 1887)
- Rhynchozoon curtum Canu & Bassler, 1923
- Rhynchozoon cutleriana (Waters, 1879)
- Rhynchozoon decoratum Winston & Jackson, 2021
- Rhynchozoon delicatulum (MacGillivray, 1890)
- Rhynchozoon detectum Harmer, 1957
- Rhynchozoon digitatum (Waters, 1879)
- Rhynchozoon discus (Kirkpatrick, 1888)
- Rhynchozoon documentum Hayward & Cook, 1983
- Rhynchozoon exigua (MacGillivray, 1860)
- Rhynchozoon ferocula Hayward, 1988
- Rhynchozoon fistulosum Hayward, 1993
- Rhynchozoon fulgidum O'Donoghue & de Watteville, 1935
- Rhynchozoon glabrum Dick, Grischenko & Mawatari, 2005
- Rhynchozoon globosum Harmer, 1957
- Rhynchozoon grandicella Canu & Bassler, 1923
- Rhynchozoon grandiporosum (Canu & Bassler, 1925)
- Rhynchozoon haha Hayward, 1988
- Rhynchozoon heteromorpha (Maplestone, 1905)
- Rhynchozoon incallidum Hayward & Cook, 1983
- Rhynchozoon inclemens Gordon, 1989
- Rhynchozoon incomitatum Tilbrook, 2006
- Rhynchozoon incrassatum (Hincks, 1882)
- Rhynchozoon incurvata (Neviani, 1902)
- Rhynchozoon itaparicaensis Almeida, Souza, Farias, Alves & Vieira, 2018
- Rhynchozoon krouzkovensis Zágoršek, 2010
- Rhynchozoon larreyi (Audouin, 1826)
- Rhynchozoon laterale Harmer, 1957
- Rhynchozoon latiavicularium Dick, Ngai & Doan, 2020
- Rhynchozoon leognanensis Vigneaux, 1949
- Rhynchozoon levigatum Canu & Bassler, 1923
- Rhynchozoon ligulatum Gordon & d'Hondt, 1997
- Rhynchozoon limatulum Ryland & Hayward, 1992
- Rhynchozoon lobulatum (Waters, 1879)
- Rhynchozoon longirostris (Hincks, 1881)
- Rhynchozoon lunifrons Dick & Grischenko, 2016
- Rhynchozoon maculosum Dick & Grischenko, 2016
- Rhynchozoon monoceros (Reuss, 1848)
- Rhynchozoon multiformatatum Liu, 2001
- Rhynchozoon nasutum Marcus, 1938
- Rhynchozoon neapolitanum Gautier, 1962
- Rhynchozoon notialis Winston & Jackson, 2021
- Rhynchozoon nudum Canu & Bassler, 1927
- Rhynchozoon obliquimandibulatum Liu, 2001
- Rhynchozoon oscitans Hayward & Cook, 1983
- Rhynchozoon oslavanensis Zágoršek, 2010
- Rhynchozoon paa Uttley & Bullivant, 1972
- Rhynchozoon papuliferum Souto, Kaufmann & Canning-Clode, 2015
- Rhynchozoon phrynoglossum Marcus, 1937
- Rhynchozoon profundum (MacGillivray, 1883)
- Rhynchozoon pseudodigitatum Zabala & Maluquer, 1988
- Rhynchozoon ptarmicum Hayward & Cook, 1983
- Rhynchozoon pustulans Hayward, 1988
- Rhynchozoon quadratus Hara, 2001
- Rhynchozoon quadrispinatum Zabala & Maluquer, 1988
- Rhynchozoon rosae Souto, Reverter-Gil & Fernández-Pulpeiro, 2010
- Rhynchozoon rostratum (Busk, 1855)
- Rhynchozoon ryukyuense Dick & Grischenko, 2016
- Rhynchozoon scimitar Dick & Grischenko, 2016
- Rhynchozoon scopulorum Ryland & Hayward, 1992
- Rhynchozoon setiavicularium Dick, Ngai & Doan, 2020
- Rhynchozoon sexaspinatum Winston & Woollacott, 2009
- Rhynchozoon solidum Osburn, 1914
- Rhynchozoon solitarium Tilbrook, 2006
- Rhynchozoon spicatum Osburn, 1952
- Rhynchozoon spiniferum (MacGillivray, 1895)
- Rhynchozoon splendens Hayward, 1988
- Rhynchozoon stomachosum Hayward & Cook, 1983
- Rhynchozoon taoraensis Tilbrook, 2006
- Rhynchozoon triangulare Harmer, 1957
- Rhynchozoon tristelidion Tilbrook, 2006
- Rhynchozoon tuberosum Canu & Bassler, 1927
- Rhynchozoon tubulosum (Hincks, 1880)
- Rhynchozoon tumulosum (Hincks, 1883)
- Rhynchozoon unispinatum Winston & Jackson, 2021
- Rhynchozoon verruculatum (Smitt, 1873)
- Rhynchozoon zealandicum Gordon, 2009
