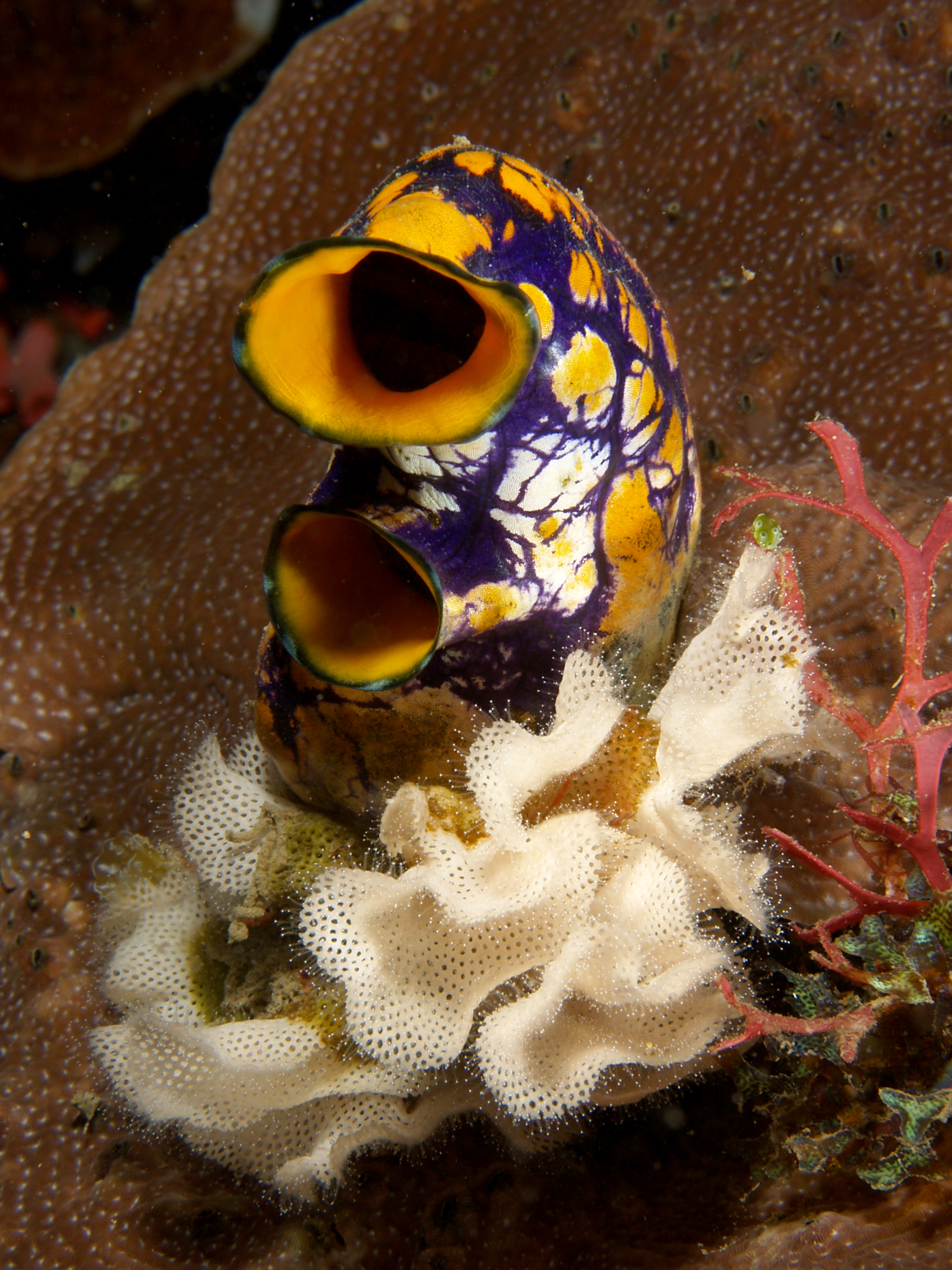
- Triphyllozoon inornatum

Scientific classification
- Kingdom: Animalia
- Phylum: Bryozoa
- Class: Gymnolaemata
- Order: Cheilostomatida
- Family: Phidoloporidae
- Genus: Triphyllozoon; Canu & Bassler, 1917

Species
- See text

= Triphyllozoon =

Genus of moss animals

Triphyllozoon is a genus of bryozoans in the family Phidoloporidae.

== Species ==
- Triphyllozoon arcuatum (MacGillivray, 1889)
- Triphyllozoon benemunitum (Hastings, 1932)
- Triphyllozoon bimunitum (Ortmann, 1890)
- Triphyllozoon bucculentum Hayward, 2004
- Triphyllozoon cornutum Silén, 1954
- Triphyllozoon floribundum Hayward, 1999
- Triphyllozoon formosoides Hayward, 2004
- Triphyllozoon formosum (MacGillivray, 1884)
- Triphyllozoon gracile Gordon & d'Hondt, 1997
- Triphyllozoon hirsutum (Busk, 1884)
- Triphyllozoon indivisum Harmer, 1934
- Triphyllozoon inornatum Harmer, 1934
- Triphyllozoon mauritzoni Silén, 1943
- Triphyllozoon microstigmatum Silén, 1954
- Triphyllozoon moniliferum (MacGillivray, 1860)
- Triphyllozoon mucronatum (Busk, 1884)
- Triphyllozoon munitum (Hincks, 1878)
- Triphyllozoon patens Harmer, 1934
- Triphyllozoon patulum Harmer, 1934
- Triphyllozoon philippinense (Busk, 1884)
- Triphyllozoon regulare Silén, 1954
- Triphyllozoon rictum Hayward, 2004
- Triphyllozoon separatum Harmer, 1934
- Triphyllozoon sinicum Liu & Li, 1987
- Triphyllozoon sinuatum (MacGillivray, 1884)
- Triphyllozoon tenue (Kirkpatrick, 1888)
- Triphyllozoon trifoliatum Harmer, 1934
- Triphyllozoon tuberculiferum Harmer, 1934
- Triphyllozoon tubulatum (Busk, 1884)
