= Phidolopora =

Scientific classification
- Kingdom: Animalia
- Phylum: Bryozoa
- Class: Gymnolaemata
- Order: Cheilostomatida
- Family: Phidoloporidae
- Genus: Phidolopora; Gabb & Horn, 1862

Genus of bryozoans

Phidolopora is a genus of bryozoans belonging to the family Phidoloporidae.

The genus has almost cosmopolitan distribution.

Species:

- Phidolopora avicularis (MacGillivray, 1883)
- Phidolopora bartrumi (Brown, 1952)
- Phidolopora chakra Boonzaaier-Davids, Florence & Gibbons, 2020
- Phidolopora cyclops Boonzaaier-Davids, Florence & Gibbons, 2020
- Phidolopora elongata (Smitt, 1866)
- Phidolopora labiata Gabb & Horn, 1862
- Phidolopora pacifica (Robertson, 1908)
- Phidolopora pacificoidea Liu, 2001
- Phidolopora robusta Canu & Bassler, 1927
- Phidolopora trisinuata Liu, 2001
