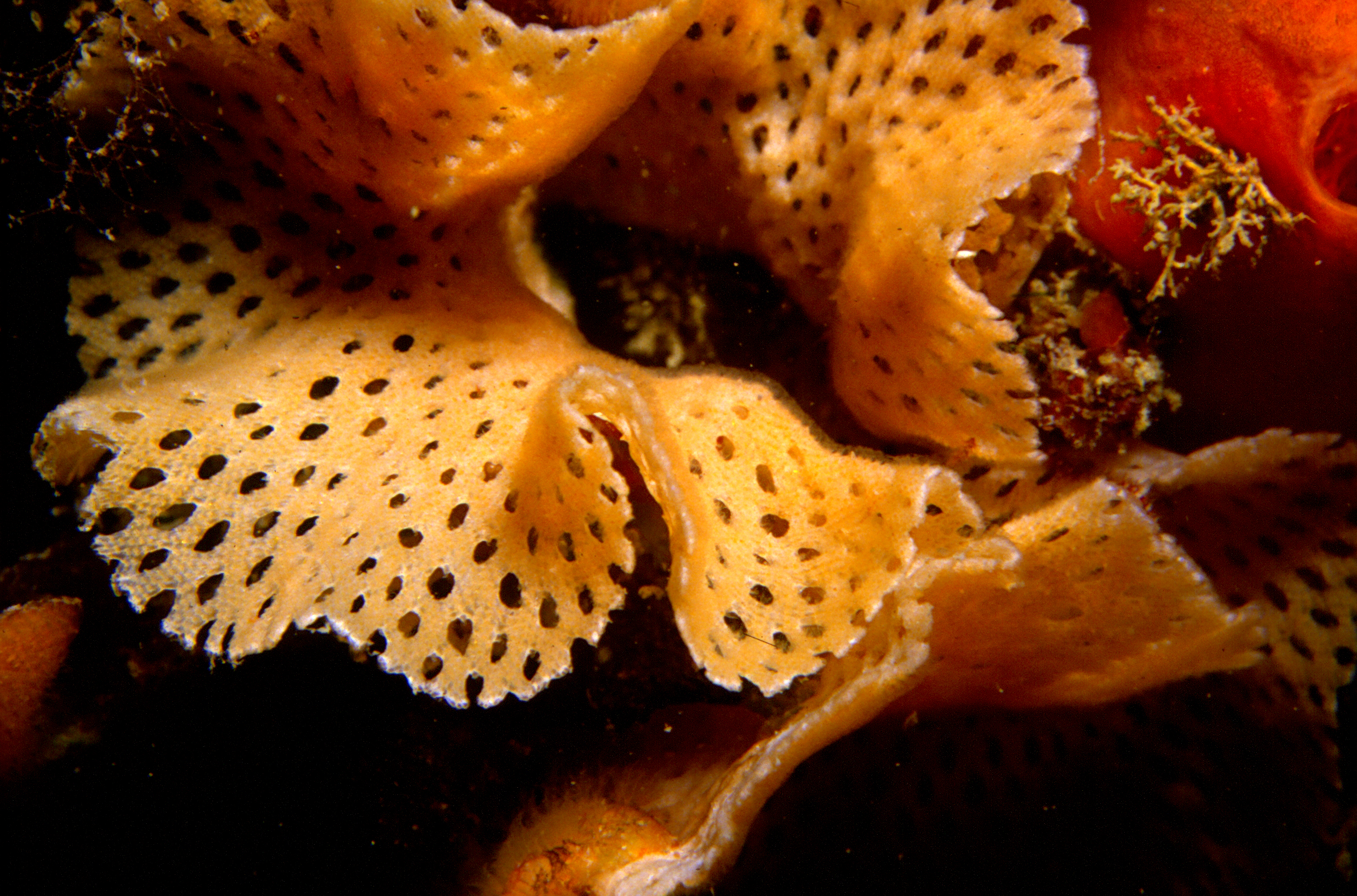
- Reteporella grimaldii

Scientific classification
- Kingdom: Animalia
- Phylum: Bryozoa
- Class: Gymnolaemata
- Order: Cheilostomatida
- Family: Phidoloporidae
- Genus: Reteporella; Busk, 1884

Species
- See text

Synonyms
- Sertella Jullien, 1903

= Reteporella =

Genus of moss animals

Reteporella is a genus of bryozoans in the family Phidoloporidae.

== Species ==
- Reteporella abnormis (Lu Nie & Zhong in Lu, 1991)
- Reteporella abyssinica (Waters, 1909)
- Reteporella alberti (Calvet, 1931)
- Reteporella antarctica (Waters, 1904)
- Reteporella antennata Ramalho, Muricy & Taylor, 2011
- Reteporella antennula (Buchner, 1924)
- Reteporella aporosa (Waters, 1895)
- Reteporella aquitanica (Jullien & Calvet, 1903)
- Reteporella arborea (Jullien, 1882)
- Reteporella atlantica (Busk, 1884)
- Reteporella aurantiaca (MacGillivray, 1883)
- Reteporella aurantium Gordon, 2009
- Reteporella axillaris
- Reteporella beaniana (King, 1846)
- Reteporella bullata (Hayward & Cook, 1979)
- Reteporella carinata (MacGillivray, 1884)
- Reteporella cellulosa (Linnaeus, 1767)
- Reteporella clancularia Hayward & Cook, 1979
- Reteporella clypeata Canu & Bassler, 1929
- Reteporella complanata (Waters, 1895)
- Reteporella concinna Gordon, 1984
- Reteporella concinnoides Gordon & d'Hondt, 1997
- Reteporella constricta (Powell, 1967)
- Reteporella couchii (Hincks, 1878)
- Reteporella cyclostoma (Harmer, 1934)
- Reteporella defensa Gordon & d'Hondt, 1997
- Reteporella dinotorhynchus Hayward & Cook, 1979
- Reteporella dorsoporata Liu & Hu, 1991
- Reteporella dumosa Hayward, 2000
- Reteporella elegans Harmelin, 1976
- Reteporella erugata Hayward, 1993
- Reteporella fenestrata (Powell, 1967)
- Reteporella ferox Gordon & d'Hondt, 1997
- Reteporella feuerbornii (Hass, 1948)
- Reteporella fimbriata Canu & Bassler, 1927
- Reteporella fissa (MacGillivray, 1869)
- Reteporella flabellata Busk, 1884
- Reteporella frigida (Waters, 1904)
- Reteporella frigidoidea (Liu & Hu, 1991)
- Reteporella gelida (Waters, 1904)
- Reteporella gigantea (Busk, 1884)
- Reteporella gilchristi (O'Donoghue, 1924)
- Reteporella gracilis Gordon, 1989
- Reteporella graeffei (Kirchenpauer, 1869)
- Reteporella granti Guha & Gopikrishna, 2007
- Reteporella granulata (MacGillivray, 1869)
- Reteporella grimaldii (Jullien, 1903)
- Reteporella harmeri (Hass, 1948)
- Reteporella hincksii (Kirkpatrick, 1888)
- Reteporella hippocrepis (Waters, 1904)
- Reteporella incognita Hayward & Ryland, 1996
- Reteporella jermanensis (Waters, 1909)
- Reteporella jullieni Calvet, 1931
- Reteporella laciniata Hayward, 2000
- Reteporella laevigata (Waters, 1904)
- Reteporella lata (Busk, 1884)
- Reteporella laxipes
- Reteporella lepralioides (Waters, 1904)
- Reteporella ligulata Gordon, 1989
- Reteporella longichila Hayward, 1993
- Reteporella longicollis Canu & Bassler, 1929
- Reteporella longifissa (Harmer, 1934)
- Reteporella magellensis (Busk, 1884)
- Reteporella malleata Hayward, 2000
- Reteporella malleatia Gordon, 1984
- Reteporella marsupiata (Smitt, 1873)
- Reteporella mediterranea Hass, 1948
- Reteporella millespinae Canu & Bassler, 1929
- Reteporella monomorpha Hayward, 2004
- Reteporella nanshaensis (Lu, Nie & Zhong in Lu, 1991)
- Reteporella obtecta (Buchner, 1924)
- Reteporella parallelata Hayward, 2000
- Reteporella parva Hayward, 1993
- Reteporella pelecanus lopez de la Cuadra & Garcia-Gomez, 2001
- Reteporella porcellana (MacGillivray, 1869)
- Reteporella prominens Canu & Bassler, 1928
- Reteporella protecta (Waters, 1904)
- Reteporella pseudofinis Canu & Bassler, 1929
- Reteporella quadripora Guha & Gopikrishna, 2007
- Reteporella reginae Hayward, 2000
- Reteporella reticulata (Powell, 1967)
- Reteporella simplex (Waters, 1888)
- Reteporella smitti Gautier, 1955
- Reteporella sparteli (Calvet, 1906)
- Reteporella spinosissima Canu & Bassler, 1929
- Reteporella sudbournensis (Gautier, 1962)
- Reteporella sudbourniensis Gautier, 1962
- Reteporella suluensis (Harmer, 1934)
- Reteporella syrtoxylon Gordon, 1989
- Reteporella tenuitelifera Canu & Bassler, 1929
- Reteporella terebrata (Buchner, 1924)
- Reteporella trabeculifera Canu & Bassler, 1927
- Reteporella tristis (Jullien, 1903)
- Reteporella tuberosa Hayward, 2000
- Reteporella unguicula Hayward, 2004
- Reteporella vallata Hayward, 2000
- Reteporella verecunda (Hayward & Cook, 1983)
- Reteporella watersi (Nordgaard, 1907)
