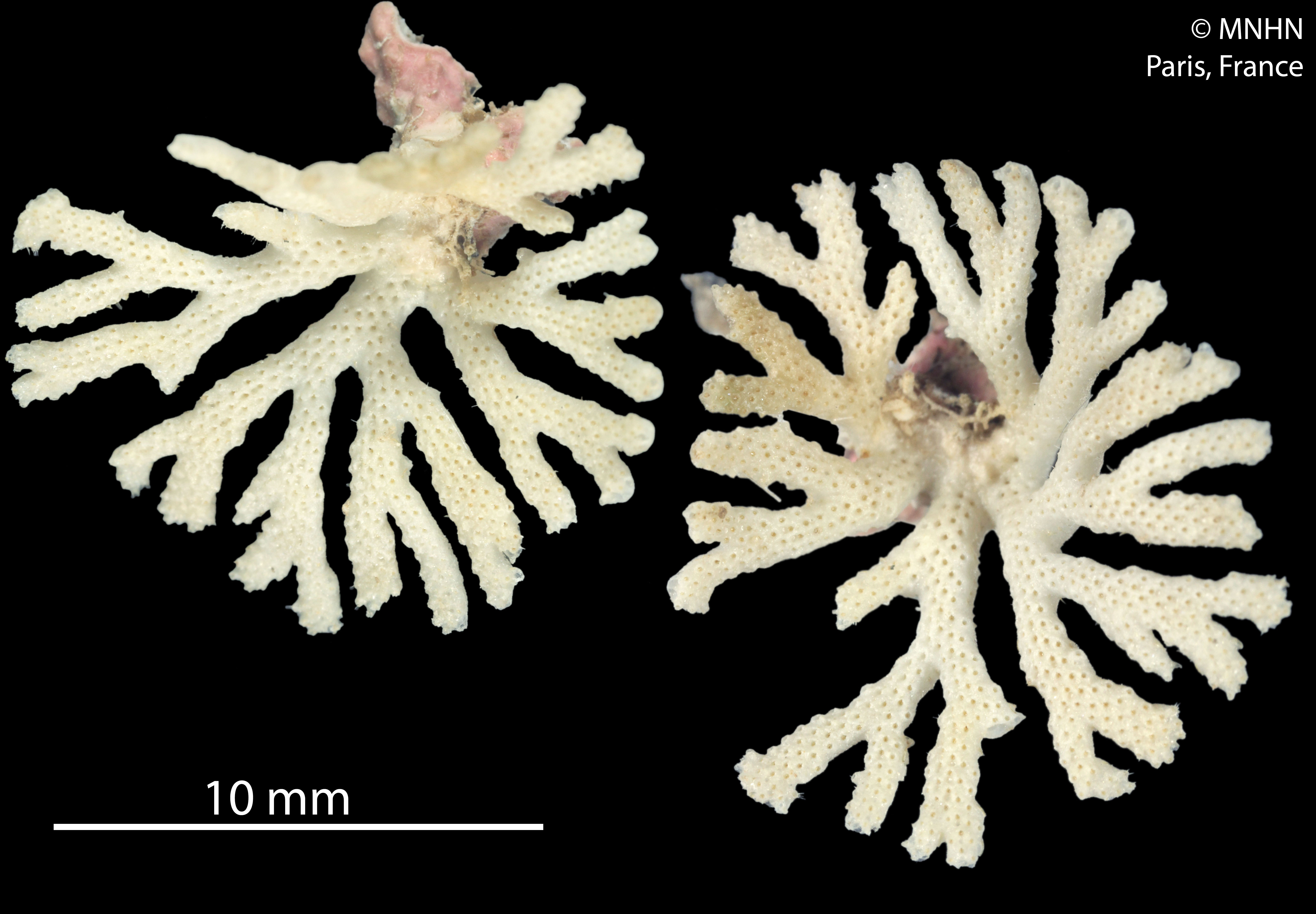
- Schizoretepora hassi

Scientific classification
- Kingdom: Animalia
- Phylum: Bryozoa
- Class: Gymnolaemata
- Order: Cheilostomatida
- Suborder: Flustrina
- Superfamily: Celleporoidea
- Family: Phidoloporidae; Gabb & Horn, 1862

Genera
- See classification

Synonyms
- Reteporidae Smitt, 1868

= Phidoloporidae =

Phidoloporidae Temporal range: Paleocene - Recent

Family of moss animals

Phidoloporidae is a family within the bryozoan order Cheilostomatida. The colonies of many genera grow in an upright, reticulate branching manner, which gave rise to one colloquial name for this group as 'lace corals'. Zooids generally open on one side of the branches.

== Classification ==
This family was previously commonly known as Reteporidae Smitt (1868), which is a junior synonym of Phidoloporidae Gabb & Horn (1862).

- Family Phidoloporidae
  - Genus Bryorachis
  - Genus Chevron
  - Genus Dentiporella
  - Genus Dictyochasma
  - Genus Fodinella
  - Genus Hippellozoon
  - Genus Hippopozoon
  - Genus Iodictyum
  - Genus Lifuella
  - Genus Malleatia
  - Genus Metacleidochasma
  - Genus Phidolopora
  - Genus Plesiocleidochasma
  - Genus Psileschara
  - Genus Psilosecos
  - Genus Reteporella
  - Genus Reteporellina
  - Genus Rhynchozoon
  - Genus Schedocleidochasma
  - Genus Schizoretepora
  - Genus Schizotheca
  - Genus Sparsiporina
  - Genus Stephanollona
  - Genus Strophiella
  - Genus Triphyllozoon
