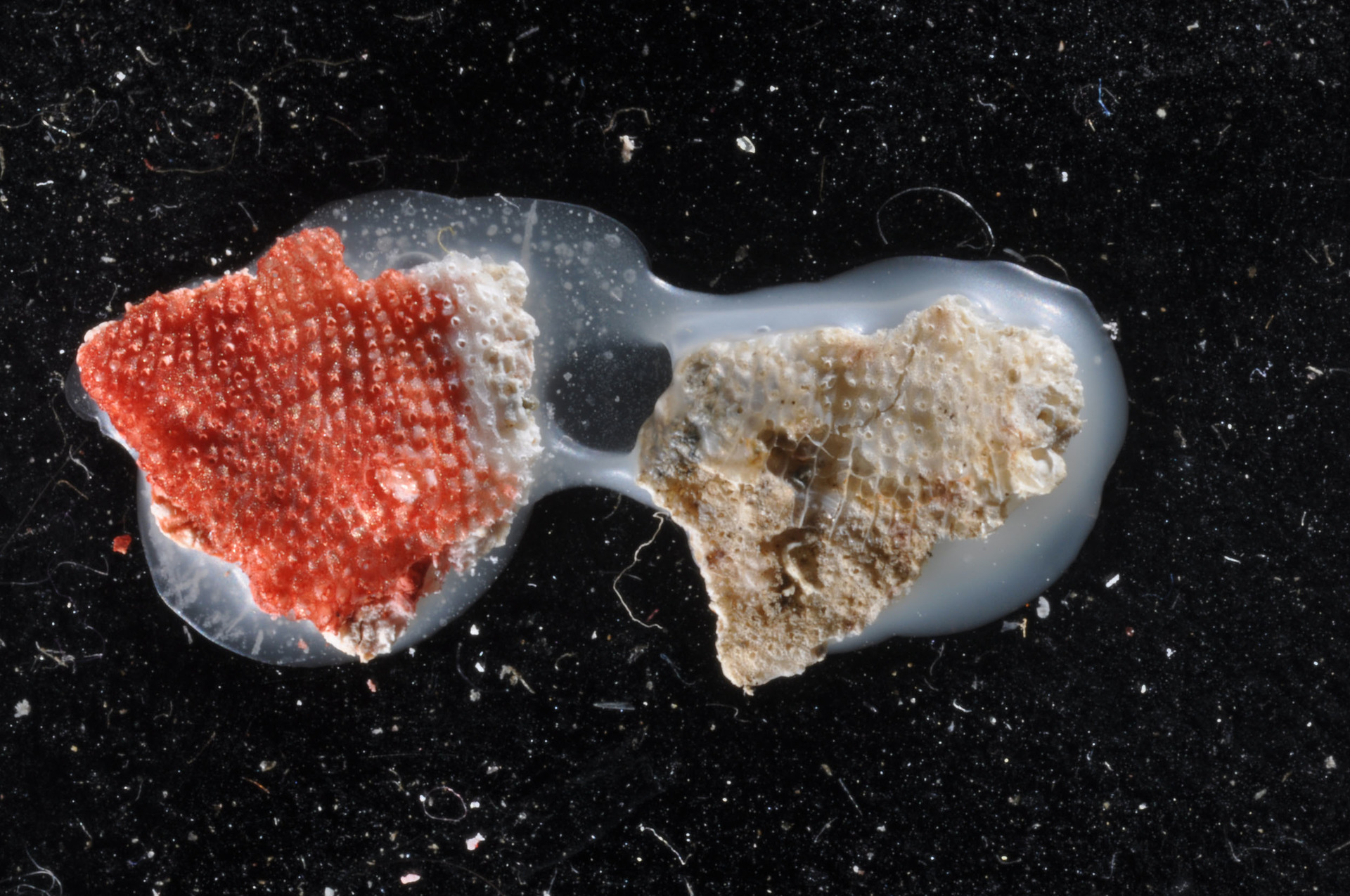

Scientific classification
- Kingdom: Animalia
- Phylum: Bryozoa
- Class: Gymnolaemata
- Order: Cheilostomatida
- Family: Smittinidae
- Genus: Parasmittina; Osburn, 1952

= Parasmittina =

Genus of bryozoans

Parasmittina is a genus of bryozoans belonging to the family Smittinidae.

The genus has cosmopolitan distribution.

== Species ==
- Parasmittina abrolhosensis Ramalho, Taylor & Moraes, 2018
- Parasmittina acondylata Dick, Ngai & Doan, 2020
- Parasmittina aculeata Tilbrook, 2006
- Parasmittina acuta (Canu & Bassler, 1929)
- Parasmittina agathae Hayward & Parker, 1994
- Parasmittina alanbanneri Soule & Soule, 1973
- Parasmittina alaskensis Osburn, 1952
- Parasmittina alba Ramalho, Muricy & Taylor, 2011
- Parasmittina aleutensis Soule & Soule, 2002
- Parasmittina alitis Winston & Jackson, 2021
- Parasmittina amazonensis Ramalho & Moraes, 2021
- Parasmittina anderseni Cheetham & Sandberg, 1964
- Parasmittina aotea (Brown, 1952)
- Parasmittina areolata (Canu & Bassler, 1927)
- Parasmittina atypica (Powell, 1967)
- Parasmittina auris Guha & Gopikrishna, 2005
- Parasmittina avicularissima Gontar, 1982
- Parasmittina aviculifera (d'Hondt, 1986)
- Parasmittina aviculifera Soule & Soule, 2002
- Parasmittina aviculoumbonata Kataoka, 1961
- Parasmittina baccula Hayward & Winston, 2011
- Parasmittina barbadensis Winston & Woollacott, 2009
- Parasmittina betamorphaea Winston, 2005
- Parasmittina bimucronata (Hincks, 1884)
- Parasmittina breli d'Hondt & Mascarell, 2010
- Parasmittina californica (Robertson, 1908)
- Parasmittina californiensis (Robertson, 1908)
- Parasmittina cheilodon (MacGillivray, 1869)
- Parasmittina chikagawaensis Hayami, 1975
- Parasmittina circinanata Liu, 2001
- Parasmittina circularis Soule & Soule, 1973
- Parasmittina collifera (Robertson, 1908)
- Parasmittina collum (Canu & Bassler, 1920)
- Parasmittina contraria Seo, 1992
- Parasmittina crosslandi (Hastings, 1930)
- Parasmittina cryptoavicularia Baradari, Nasrolahi & Taylor, 2019
- Parasmittina cyclops Winston & Jackson, 2021
- Parasmittina delicatula (Busk, 1884)
- Parasmittina dentigera (Harmer, 1957)
- Parasmittina dependeo Tilbrook, 2006
- Parasmittina distincta Ramalho, Taylor. & Moraes, 2018
- Parasmittina dolabrata Soule & Soule, 1973
- Parasmittina dubitata Hayward, 1980
- Parasmittina eccentrica Winston & Jackson, 2021
- Parasmittina echinata Canu & Bassler, 1928
- Parasmittina egyptiaca (Waters, 1909)
- Parasmittina emersoni Soule & Soule, 1973
- Parasmittina ensifera (Maplestone, 1909)
- Parasmittina erecta Gordon & d'Hondt, 1997
- Parasmittina exasperatrix d'Hondt, 1986
- Parasmittina exiguiuncinata Tilbrook, 2006
- Parasmittina fistulata (Harmer, 1957)
- Parasmittina floridana Winston, 2005
- Parasmittina fraseri Osburn, 1952
- Parasmittina galerita Ryland & Hayward, 1992
- Parasmittina geometrica (Kirkpatrick, 1890)
- Parasmittina glabra Gordon & d'Hondt, 1997
- Parasmittina glomerata (Thornely, 1912)
- Parasmittina gujaratica Guha & Gopikrishna, 2005
- Parasmittina hanzawae Kataoka, 1960
- Parasmittina harudiensis Guha & Gopikrishna, 2005
- Parasmittina hastingsae Soule & Soule, 1973
- Parasmittina ilioensis Soule & Soule, 1973
- Parasmittina inalienata Tilbrook, 2006
- Parasmittina indigenella Winston & Jackson, 2021
- Parasmittina indiginella Winston, 2016
- Parasmittina japonica (Ortmann, 1890)
- Parasmittina jeffreysi (Norman, 1876)
- Parasmittina johni Guha & Gopikrishna, 2005
- Parasmittina kauaiensis Soule & Soule, 1973
- Parasmittina labellum (Canu & Bassler, 1928)
- Parasmittina latiavicularia (Kirkpatrick, 1888)
- Parasmittina lavela Soule & Soule, 2002
- Parasmittina leviavicularia Soule & Soule, 1973
- Parasmittina livingstonei (Powell, 1967)
- Parasmittina longirostrata Liu, 2001
- Parasmittina loxa (Marcus, 1937)
- Parasmittina loxoides Winston, Vieira & Woollacott, 2014
- Parasmittina luteoserrula Winston & Jackson, 2021
- Parasmittina macginitiei Soule & Soule, 2002
- Parasmittina macphersonae Powell, 1967
- Parasmittina margaritata Hayward, 1988
- Parasmittina marsupialis (Busk, 1884)
- Parasmittina masudai Hayami, 1975
- Parasmittina mauritiana Hayward, 1988
- Parasmittina mexicana Pouyet & Herrera-Anduaga, 1986
- Parasmittina multiaviculata Souto, Ramalhosa & Canning-Clode, 2016
- Parasmittina munita (Hincks, 1884)
- Parasmittina murarmata (Kirkpatrick, 1888)
- Parasmittina nasuta (Harmer, 1957)
- Parasmittina natalensis O'Donoghue, 1957
- Parasmittina nitida (Verrill, 1875)
- Parasmittina novella Hayward & Cook, 1983
- Parasmittina obstructa (Waters, 1889)
- Parasmittina oculinae Winston, 2016
- Parasmittina okadai Hayami, 1975
- Parasmittina onychorrhyncha Ryland & Hayward, 1992
- Parasmittina ornata (Thornely, 1912)
- Parasmittina ovilirata Tilbrook, 2006
- Parasmittina papulata Harmer, 1957
- Parasmittina paradicei (Livingstone, 1926)
- Parasmittina parsevaliformis Soule & Soule, 1973
- Parasmittina parsevalii (Audouin, 1826)
- Parasmittina parsevalioidea Liu, 2001
- Parasmittina parsloeparsloei Hayward & Parker, 1994
- Parasmittina parvitatis Tilbrook, 2006
- Parasmittina parviuncinata Soule & Soule, 1973
- Parasmittina pectinata Hayward & Parker, 1994
- Parasmittina peristoaviculata Kataoka, 1961
- Parasmittina pinctatae Liu, 2001
- Parasmittina plana Kataoka, 1961
- Parasmittina projecta (Okada & Mawatari, 1937)
- Parasmittina protecta (Thornely, 1905)
- Parasmittina proximoproducta Moyano, 1983
- Parasmittina pugetensis Soule & Soule, 2002
- Parasmittina pyriformis Seo, 2002
- Parasmittina raigiformis Soule & Soule, 1973
- Parasmittina raigii (Audouin, 1826)
- Parasmittina raigioidea Liu, 2001
- Parasmittina recidiva Hayward, 1988
- Parasmittina regularis Soule & Soule, 2002
- Parasmittina rimula Tilbrook, 2006
- Parasmittina rostriformis (Kirkpatrick, 1888)
- Parasmittina rouvillei (Calvet, 1902)
- Parasmittina saccoi (Canu, 1913)
- Parasmittina santacruzana Soule & Soule, 2002
- Parasmittina serrula Soule & Soule, 1973
- Parasmittina serruloides Harmelin, Bitar & Zibrowius, 2009
- Parasmittina shibikawaensis Hayami, 1975
- Parasmittina simpulata Winston, Vieira & Woollacott, 2014
- Parasmittina solenosmilioides Hayward & Parker, 1994
- Parasmittina soulesi Scholz & Cusi, 1993
- Parasmittina spathulata (Smitt, 1873)
- Parasmittina spiculata Gluhak, Lewis & Popijak, 2007
- Parasmittina spondylicola Harmelin, Bitar & Zibrowius, 2009
- Parasmittina subtubulata (Harmer, 1957)
- Parasmittina talismani (Calvet, 1907)
- Parasmittina tatianae Denisenko, 2015
- Parasmittina telum (Canu & Bassler, 1920)
- Parasmittina triangularis (Mawatari, 1952)
- Parasmittina trianguliforma Soule & Soule, 2002
- Parasmittina trispinosa (Johnston, 1838)
- Parasmittina tropica (Waters, 1909)
- Parasmittina trunculata Tilbrook, 2006
- Parasmittina tubula (Kirkpatrick, 1888)
- Parasmittina tubulata Osburn, 1952
- Parasmittina turbula Ryland & Hayward, 1992
- Parasmittina uncinata Soule & Soule, 1973
- Parasmittina vacuramosa Lu, Nie & Zhong, 1991
- Parasmittina variabilis Liu, 2001
- Parasmittina veniliae Winston & Jackson, 2021
- Parasmittina winstonae Liu, 2001
