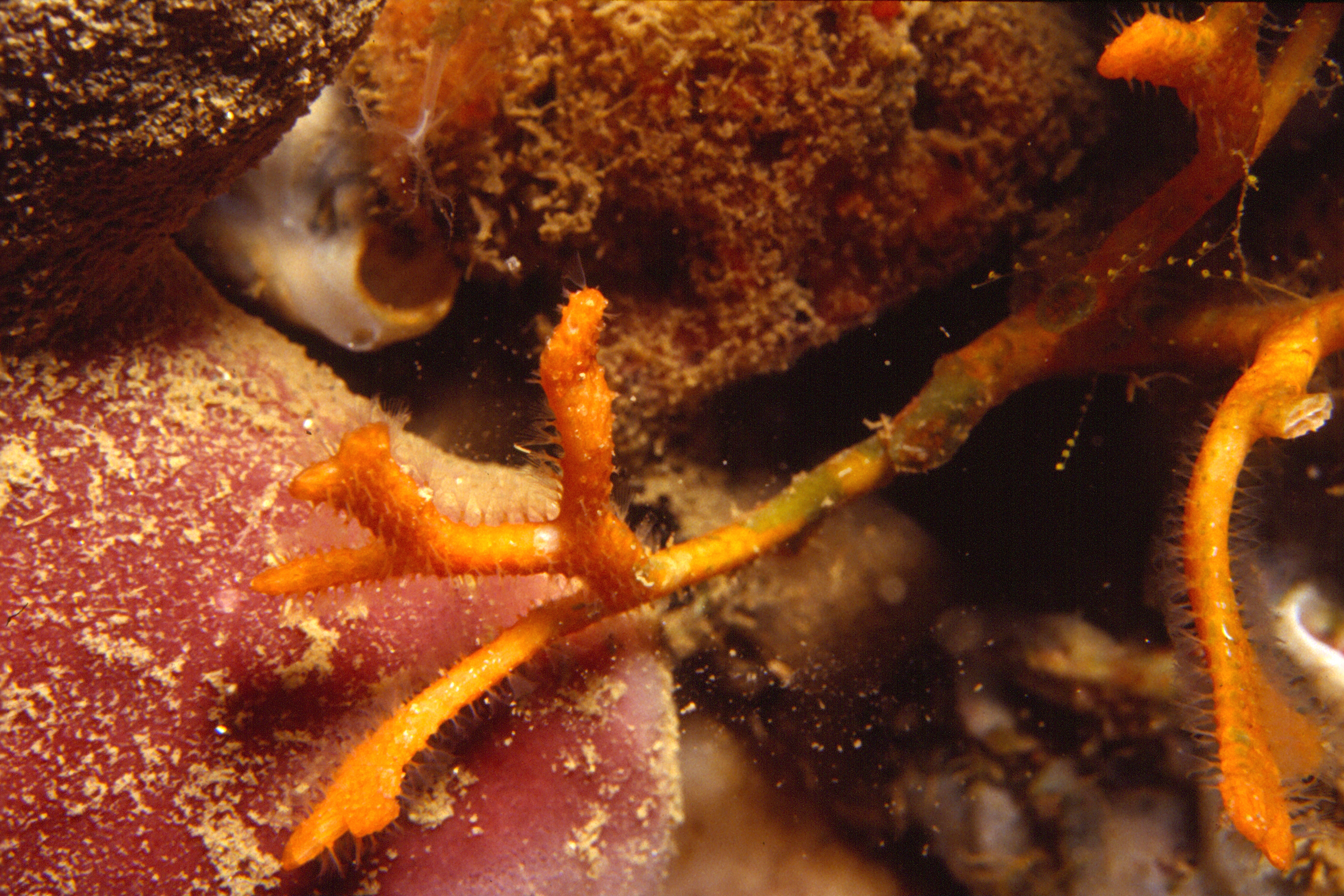
- Smittina cervicornis

Scientific classification
- Kingdom: Animalia
- Phylum: Bryozoa
- Class: Gymnolaemata
- Order: Cheilostomatida
- Superfamily: Smittinoidea
- Family: Smittinidae; Levinsen, 1909

Genera
- See classification

= Smittinidae =

Smittinidae Temporal range: Eocene - Recent

Family of moss animals

The Smittinidae is a family within the bryozoan order Cheilostomatida. Colonies are encrusting on shells and rocks or upright bilaminar branches or sheets. The zooids generally have at least one adventitious avicularia on their frontal wall near the orifice. The frontal wall is usually covered with small pores and numerous larger pores along the margin. The ovicell, which broods the larvae internally, is double-layered with numerous pores in the outer layer, and sits quite prominently on the frontal wall of the next zooid.

== Classification ==
- Family Smittinidae
  - Genus Alismittina
  - Genus Aspericreta
  - Genus Dakariella
  - Genus Dengordonia
  - Genus Dittomesia
  - Genus Hemismittoidea
  - Genus Hippophylactella
  - Genus Houzeauina
  - Genus Parasmittina
  - Genus Pemmatoporella
  - Genus Phylactella
  - Genus Phylactellina
  - Genus Plagiosmittia
  - Genus Platychelyna
  - Genus Pleurocodonellina
  - Genus Porismittina
  - Genus Prenantia
  - Genus Raymondcia
  - Genus Rimulostoma
  - Genus Schismoporella
  - Genus Smittina
  - Genus Smittinella
  - Genus Smittoidea
  - Genus Thrypticocirrus
  - Genus Tracheloptyx
