= Smittina =

Scientific classification
- Kingdom: Animalia
- Phylum: Bryozoa
- Class: Gymnolaemata
- Order: Cheilostomatida
- Family: Smittinidae
- Genus: Smittina; Norman, 1903

Genus of bryozoans

Smittina is a genus of bryozoans belonging to the family Smittinidae.

The genus has cosmopolitan distribution.

Species:

- Smittia incisa Canu, 1904
- Smittia levinseni Nordgård, 1903
- Smittia robusta Jullien, 1903
- Smittia schlumbergeri Jullien, 1903
- Smittia subtorquata Canu, 1904
- Smittia zuccari Neviani, 1895
- Smittina abditavicularis Rogick, 1956
- Smittina abyssicola (Harmer, 1957)
- Smittina acaroensis Levinsen, 1909
- Smittina acicularis Figuerola, Gordon & Cristobo, 2018
- Smittina acuminata (Ridley, 1881)
- Smittina affinis (Hincks, 1862)
- Smittina alata d'Hondt, 1986
- Smittina alticollarita Rogick, 1956
- Smittina altirostris Osburn, 1952
- Smittina anecdota Hayward & Thorpe, 1990
- Smittina antarctica (Waters, 1904)
- Smittina arctica (Norman, 1894)
- Smittina areolata O'Donoghue & O'Donoghue, 1923
- Smittina asymmetrica Gordon & d'Hondt, 1997
- Smittina aviculifera (Canu, 1912)
- Smittina azorensis (Jullien, 1903)
- Smittina baccata Canu & Bassler, 1930
- Smittina bassleri Cipolla, 1928
- Smittina bathydonta Brown, 1952
- Smittina bella (Busk, 1860)
- Smittina beringia Kluge, 1952
- Smittina bidentata Androsova, 1958
- Smittina brevis Canu & Bassler, 1919
- Smittina canavarii (Neviani, 1900)
- Smittina cervicornis (Pallas, 1766)
- Smittina chilensis Moyano, 1991
- Smittina confluens (Reuss, 1864)
- Smittina confusa d'Hondt, 1978
- Smittina cophia Canu & Bassler, 1920
- Smittina cordata Osburn, 1952
- Smittina coronata Canu & Bassler, 1920
- Smittina crepidula Brown, 1952
- Smittina cribraria (MacGillivray, 1886)
- Smittina crystallina (Norman, 1867)
- Smittina ctenocondyla Hayward & Thorpe, 1990
- Smittina curta Canu, 1926
- Smittina curvirostrata De Blauwe & Gordon, 2014
- Smittina cylindrica (Canu, 1908)
- Smittina deangelisi (Neviani, 1905)
- Smittina depressa (MacGillivray, 1895)
- Smittina derwiesi (Canu, 1908)
- Smittina dieuzeidei Gautier, 1955
- Smittina diffidentia Hayward & Thorpe, 1989
- Smittina diplostoma (Philippi, 1843)
- Smittina directa (Waters, 1904)
- Smittina discoidea Canu & Bassler, 1923
- Smittina eagari Brown, 1958
- Smittina ectoproctolitica Moyano, 1982
- Smittina emiliana Pizzaferri, 2004
- Smittina euparypha Marcus, 1921
- Smittina excentrica (Canu, 1912)
- Smittina excertiaviculata Rogick, 1956
- Smittina exclusa Harmer, 1957
- Smittina exigua Canu & Bassler, 1920
- Smittina ferruginea Hayward & Cook, 1983
- Smittina fontensis Julien, 1940
- Smittina forata Canu & Bassler, 1929
- Smittina forticula Winston, 2016
- Smittina fragaria Moyano, 1983
- Smittina glebula Hayward & Thorpe, 1990
- Smittina grandicella Canu & Bassler, 1923
- Smittina grandifossa Canu & Bassler, 1920
- Smittina granulata (Canu, 1908)
- Smittina granulosa Canu & Bassler, 1920
- Smittina hanaishiensis Hayami, 1975
- Smittina hatsushima Okada & Mawatari, 1937
- Smittina humilis Gontar, 2008
- Smittina impellucida Gontar, 2008
- Smittina imragueni Matsuyama, Titschack, Baum & Freiwald, 2015
- Smittina inarmata Brown, 1958
- Smittina incernicula Hayward & Thorpe, 1990
- Smittina insulata Hayward & Thorpe, 1990
- Smittina invisitata Sokurov, 1975
- Smittina isabelae Souto, Berning & Ostrovsky, 2016
- Smittina jacobensis (Busk, 1884)
- Smittina jacquelinae Moyano, 1983
- Smittina jeddreysi Norman, 1903
- Smittina jordii Reverter-Gil & Fernandez-Pulpeiro, 1999
- Smittina jullieni Moyano, 1983
- Smittina kobjakovae Androsova, 1958
- Smittina kukuiula Soule & Soule, 1973
- Smittina kussakini Gontar, 1993
- Smittina labiatula Canu & Bassler, 1920
- Smittina landsborovii (Johnston, 1847)
- Smittina lebruni (Waters, 1905)
- Smittina lecointrei Buge, 1961
- Smittina leda (d'Orbigny, 1852)
- Smittina leptodentata Hayward & Thorpe, 1990
- Smittina lobata (Busk, 1859)
- Smittina maccullochae Osburn, 1952
- Smittina macgillivrayi (Maplestone, 1902)
- Smittina malleolus (Hincks, 1884)
- Smittina malouinensis (Jullien, 1888)
- Smittina marionensis (Busk, 1854)
- Smittina messiniensis El Hajjaji, 1992
- Smittina microtheca Canu & Lecointre, 1930
- Smittina migottoi Vieira, Gordon, Souza & Haddad, 2010
- Smittina minima Powell, 1967
- Smittina minuscula (Smitt, 1868)
- Smittina molarifera Moyano, 1982
- Smittina monacha (Jullien, 1888)
- Smittina mucronata (Smitt, 1868)
- Smittina muliebris Kluge, 1962
- Smittina multanguloporata Gontar, 2008
- Smittina nitidissima (Hincks, 1880)
- Smittina nodai Hayami, 1975
- Smittina normani Aristegui, 1988
- Smittina obicullata Rogick, 1956
- Smittina obicullatoidea Liu & Hu, 1991
- Smittina oblita Lopez Gappa, 2002
- Smittina obscura (MacGillivray, 1891)
- Smittina oculata (MacGillivray, 1883)
- Smittina orbavicularia Canu & Bassler, 1920
- Smittina ordinata (MacGillivray, 1895)
- Smittina osburni Hayami, 1975
- Smittina ovirotula Soule, Soule & Chaney, 1995
- Smittina palisada Gordon, 1989
- Smittina papillifera (MacGillivray, 1869)
- Smittina parviovicellosa Canu & Bassler, 1935
- Smittina personata (Hincks, 1884)
- Smittina pileata (Waters, 1904)
- Smittina pliofistulata Hayward & Thorpe, 1990
- Smittina pocilla Hayward & Thorpe, 1990
- Smittina porelloides (Canu & Bassler, 1920)
- Smittina porrigens (Reuss, 1865)
- Smittina portiuscula Hayward & Thorpe, 1990
- Smittina pouyetae El Hajjaji, 1992
- Smittina protrusa Powell, 1967
- Smittina pseudoacutirostris Gostilovskaya, 1957
- Smittina pseudocompressa Androsova, 1958
- Smittina pulchra Androsova, 1958
- Smittina punctata Powell, 1967
- Smittina punctifera (Canu, 1908)
- Smittina puncturata Canu & Bassler, 1920
- Smittina pupa Canu & Bassler, 1920
- Smittina purpurea (Hincks, 1881)
- Smittina remotorostrata (Canu & Bassler, 1928)
- Smittina reptans (Waters, 1904)
- Smittina reticuloides Canu & Bassler, 1920
- Smittina retifrons Osburn, 1952
- Smittina rigida Lorenz, 1886
- Smittina rogickae Hayward & Taylor, 1984
- Smittina rosacea Powell, 1967
- Smittina rosefieldensis McGuirt, 1941
- Smittina salsa Pizzaferri, 2004
- Smittina scrupea Hayward & Taylor, 1984
- Smittina seguenzai (Reuss, 1869)
- Smittina sextapuncta (Canu, 1912)
- Smittina sigillata (Jullien, 1888)
- Smittina sitella Hayward & Cook, 1983
- Smittina smitti (Kirchenpauer, 1874)
- Smittina smittiana (Busk, 1884)
- Smittina smittiella Osburn, 1947
- Smittina sordida Canu & Bassler, 1920
- Smittina spathulifera (Hincks, 1884)
- Smittina spiraminifera Gordon, 1984
- Smittina stigmatophora (Busk, 1884)
- Smittina stricta Vigneaux, 1949
- Smittina subcordata Gontar, 1993
- Smittina terraenovae Brown, 1954
- Smittina thompsoni Kluge, 1955
- Smittina torques Powell, 1967
- Smittina triangularis Duvergier, 1921
- Smittina tuberosa Kluge, 1952
- Smittina tubulata (Gabb & Horn, 1862)
- Smittina umbilicata (Römer, 1863)
- Smittina undulimargo Moyano, 1983
- Smittina unicus Tilbrook, 2006
- Smittina uruguayensis d'Hondt, 1981
- Smittina uschakowi Androsova, 1958
- Smittina uttleyi Brown, 1958
- Smittina vaciva (Jullien, 1882)
- Smittina variavicularis Mawatari, 1974
- Smittina veleroa Soule, Soule & Chaney, 1995
- Smittina volcanica Moyano, 1983
