= Catenicella elegans =

Scientific classification
- Kingdom: Animalia
- Phylum: Bryozoa
- Class: Gymnolaemata
- Order: Cheilostomatida
- Family: Catenicellidae
- Genus: Catenicella
- Species: C. elegans

Binomial name
- Catenicella elegans Busk, 1852

Subspecies
- Catenicella elegans robusta (Stach, 1936)

Species of moss animal

Catenicella elegans is a species of bryozoans in the genus Catenicella. It is found in New Zealand.
