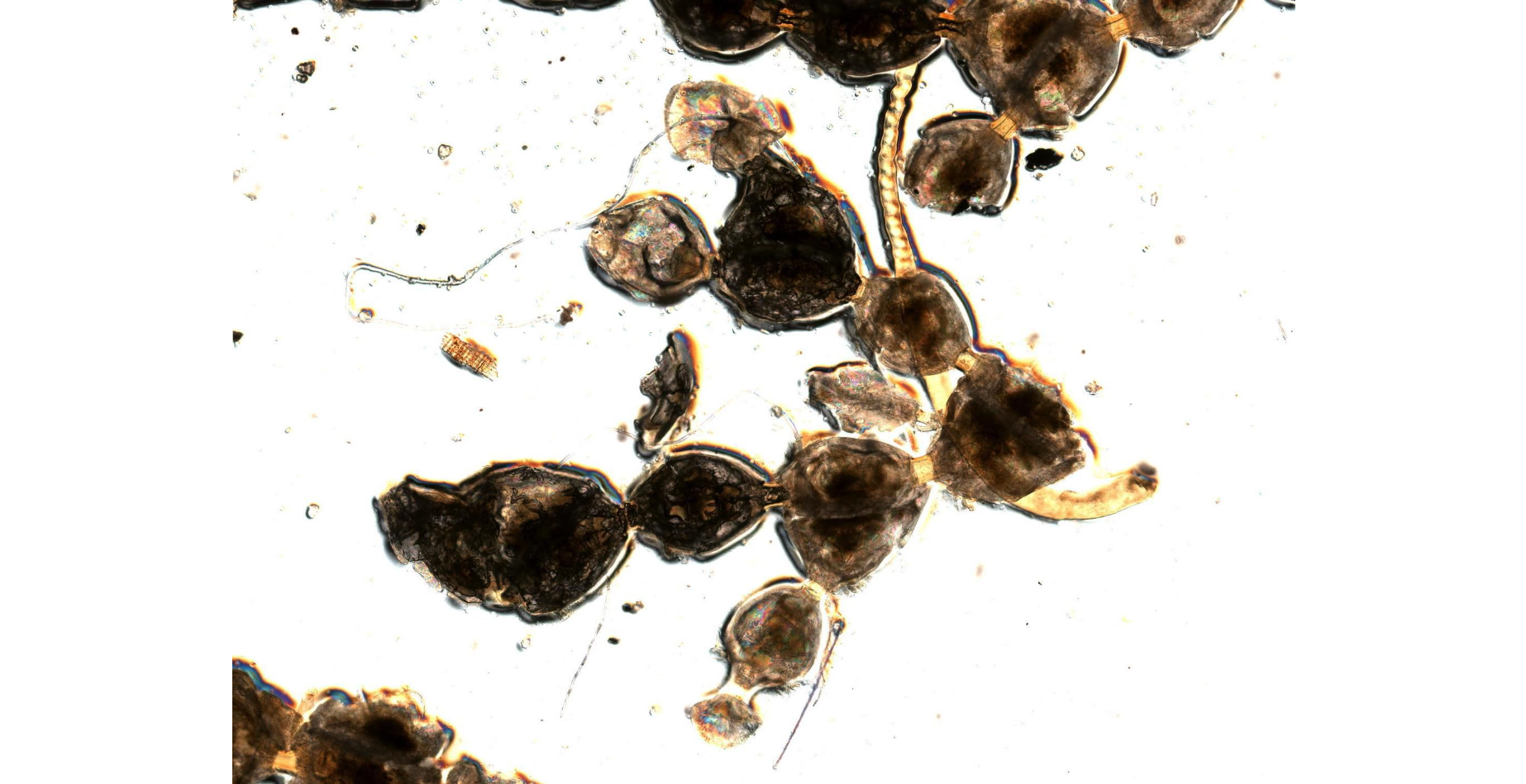
- Pterocella sp. (YPM IZ 088894)
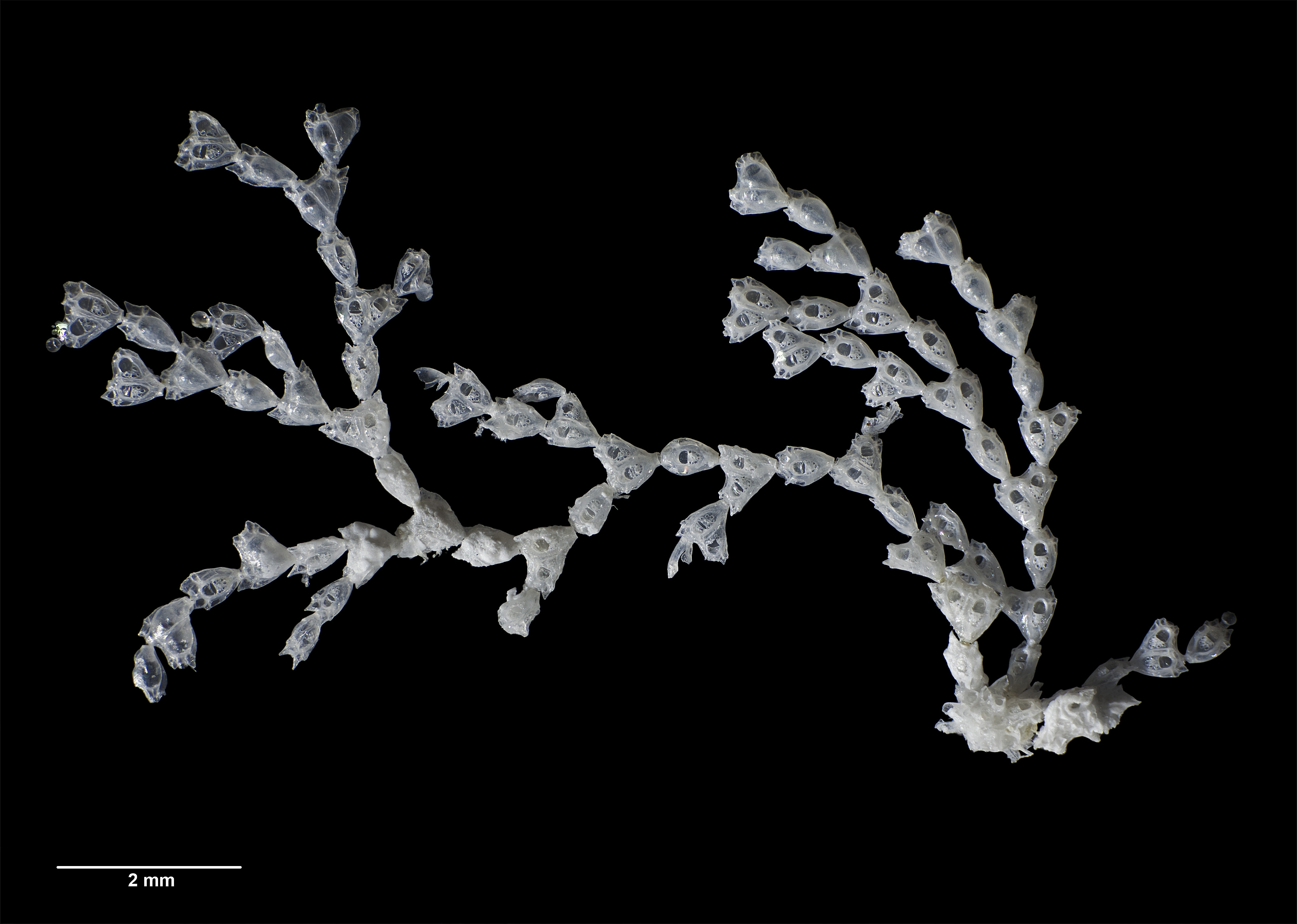
- Pterocella vesiculosa (AM MA117162-1)

Scientific classification
- Kingdom: Animalia
- Phylum: Bryozoa
- Class: Gymnolaemata
- Order: Cheilostomatida
- Family: Catenicellidae
- Genus: Pterocella; Levinsen, 1909

= Pterocella =

Genus of bryozoans

Pterocella is a genus of bryozoans belonging to the family Catenicellidae. The genus was first described by Georg Marius Reinald Levinsen in 1909.

The species of this genus are found in Australia (off the coasts of Western Australia, South Australia and New South Wales), and New Zealand.

Species:

- Pterocella elongata (MacGillivray, 1895)
- Pterocella flexuosa (Waters, 1881)
- Pterocella gemella (MacGillivray, 1887)
- Pterocella halli (Maplestone, 1899)
- Pterocella scutella (Hutton, 1891)
- Pterocella vesiculosa (Lamarck, 1816)
