= Claviporella =

Scientific classification
- Kingdom: Animalia
- Phylum: Bryozoa
- Class: Gymnolaemata
- Order: Cheilostomatida
- Family: Catenicellidae
- Genus: Claviporella; MacGillivray, 1887

Genus of bryozoans

Claviporella is a genus of bryozoans belonging to the family Catenicellidae.

The species of this genus are found in Australia and New Zealand.

Species:

- Claviporella airensis Maplestone, 1911
- Claviporella angusta MacGillivray, 1895
- Claviporella aurita (Busk, 1852)
- Claviporella bicornis Maplestone, 1911
- Claviporella geminata (Wyville Thomson, 1858)
- Claviporella goldsteini Bale, 1922
- Claviporella imperforata MacGillivray, 1887
- Claviporella longicollis (Waters, 1883)
- Claviporella marionae MacGillivray, 1895
- Claviporella obliqua MacGillivray, 1895
- Claviporella pulchra MacGillivray, 1887
- Claviporella pusilla (Wilson, 1880)
