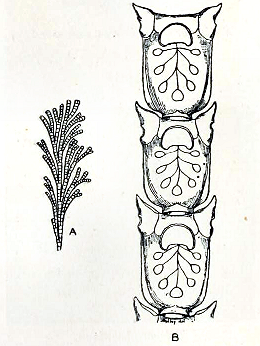
- Catenicella ventricosa; A. natural size B. magnified

Scientific classification
- Kingdom: Animalia
- Phylum: Bryozoa
- Class: Gymnolaemata
- Order: Cheilostomatida
- Family: Catenicellidae
- Genus: Catenicella de Blainville, 1830

Species
- See text

= Catenicella =

Genus of bryozoans

Catenicella are a genus of bryozoans in the family Catenicellidae.

== Species ==
- Catenicella buskii Wyville Thomson, 1858
- Catenicella castanea Wyville Thomson, 1858
- Catenicella constans (Powell, 1967)
- Catenicella contei (Audouin, 1826)
- Catenicella cylindriformis (Harmer, 1957)
- Catenicella dawsoni Wyville Thomson, 1858
- Catenicella delicatula (Wilson, 1880)
- Catenicella elegans Busk, 1852
- Catenicella formosa Busk, 1852
- Catenicella fusca MacGillivray, 1884
- Catenicella gibbosa Busk, 1852
- Catenicella glabrosa Branch & Hayward, 2005
- Catenicella gracilenta MacGillivray, 1885
- Catenicella hannafordi MacGillivray, 1869
- Catenicella imperfecta (Harmer, 1957)
- Catenicella longicaudata (Harmer, 1957)
- Catenicella marceli Gluhak, Lewis & Popijak, 2007
- Catenicella paradoxa Rosso, 2009
- Catenicella pseudoelegans Gordon, 2009
- Catenicella ringens Busk, 1852
- Catenicella tenella (Harmer, 1957)
- Catenicella teres (MacGillivray, 1895)
- Catenicella triangulifera (Harmer, 1957)
- Catenicella tuberculifera (Harmer, 1957)
- Catenicella uberrima (Harmer, 1957)
- Catenicella utriculus MacGillivray, 1884
- Catenicella venusta Macgillivray, 1887

== See also ==
- List of prehistoric bryozoans
