= Bryosartor =

Scientific classification
- Kingdom: Animalia
- Phylum: Bryozoa
- Class: Gymnolaemata
- Order: Cheilostomatida
- Family: Catenicellidae
- Genus: Bryosartor; Gordon & Braga, 1994
- Species: B. sutilis

Binomial name
- Bryosartor sutilis Gordon & Braga, 1994

Genus of bryozoan

Bryosartor is a genus of bryozoan described by Gordon and Braga in 1994. The only species is Bryosartor sutilis. It belongs to the family Catenicellidae. No subspecies are listed. It is a marine bryozoan known from New Caledonia.
