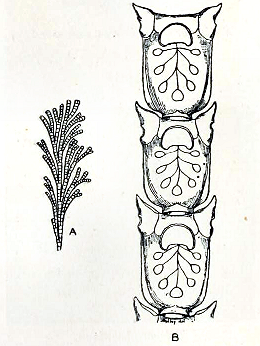
- Catenicella ventricosa; A. natural size B. magnified

Scientific classification
- Kingdom: Animalia
- Phylum: Bryozoa
- Class: Gymnolaemata
- Order: Cheilostomatida
- Suborder: Flustrina
- Superfamily: Catenicelloidea
- Family: Catenicellidae; Busk, 1852

Genera
- See text

= Catenicellidae =

Catenicellidae Temporal range: Late Cretaceous - Recent

Family of bryozoans

The Catenicellidae are a family of bryozoans in the suborder Flustrina.

Genera include:

- Bryosartor
- Calpidium
- Catenicella
- Claviporella
- Cornuticella
- Cornuticellina
- Costaticella
- Cribricellina
- Orthoscuticella
- Paracribricellina
- Plagiopora
- Pterocella
- Scalicella
- Scuticella
- Strongylopora
- Strophipora
- Talivittaticella
- Terminocella
- Vasignyella
