= Aeverrillia =

Scientific classification
- Kingdom: Animalia
- Phylum: Bryozoa
- Class: Gymnolaemata
- Order: Ctenostomatida
- Suborder: Stoloniferina
- Superfamily: Aeverrillioidea
- Family: Aeverrilliidae; Jebram, 1973
- Genus: Aeverrillia; Marcus, 1941

Species
- Aeverrillia armata (Verrill, 1873); Aeverrillia pilosa (Harmer, 1915); Aeverrillia setigera (Hincks, 1887)

Genus of bryozoans

Aeverrillia is a genus of bryozoans belonging to the order Ctenostomatida. It is the only genus in the monotypic family Aeverrilliidae.
