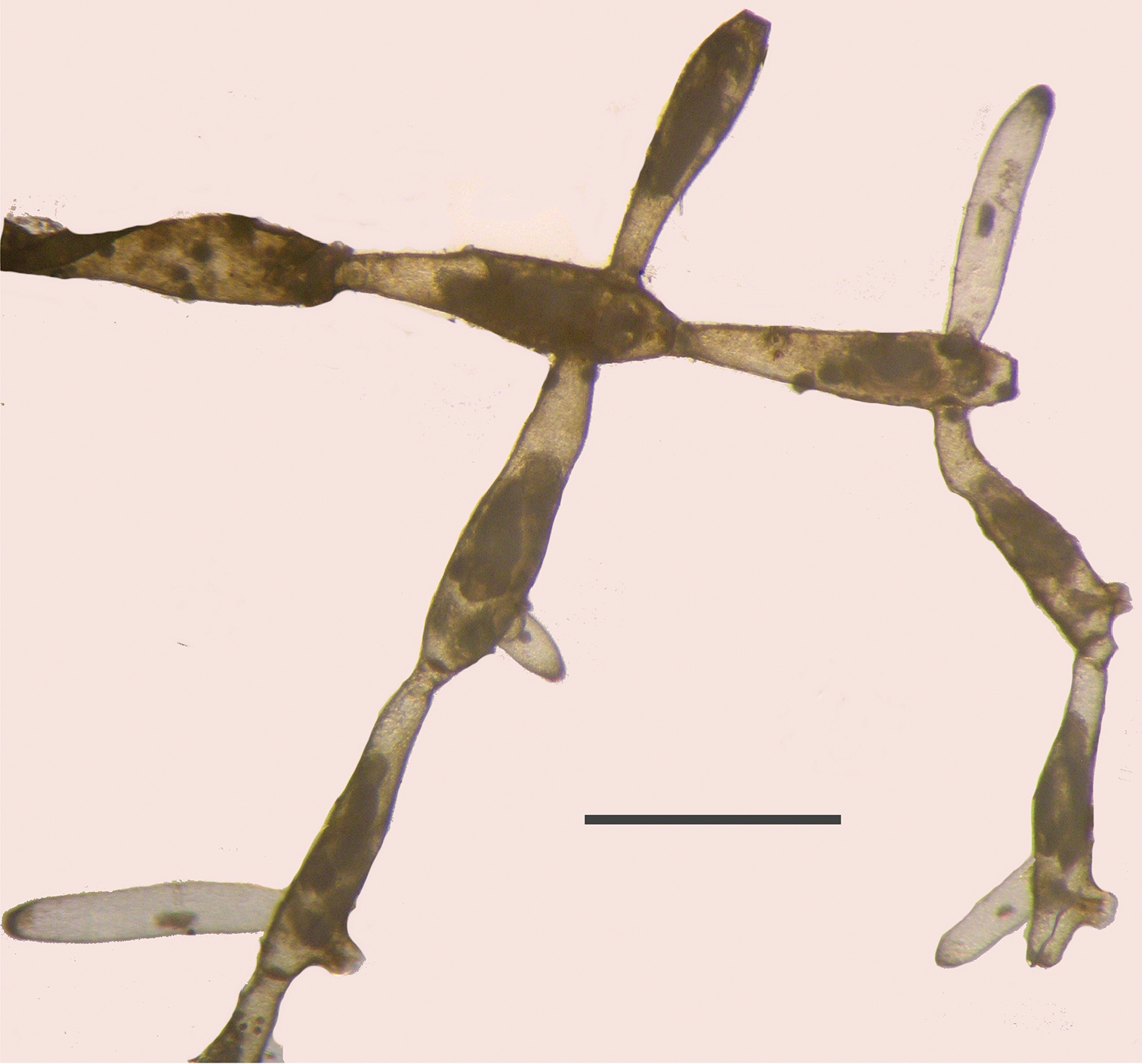

Scientific classification
- Domain: Eukaryota
- Kingdom: Animalia
- Phylum: Bryozoa
- Class: Gymnolaemata
- Order: Ctenostomatida
- Family: Paludicellidae
- Genus: Paludicella
- Species: P. articulata

Binomial name
- Paludicella articulata (Ehrenberg, 1831)

Synonyms
- Alcyonella articulata Ehrenberg, 1831

= Paludicella articulata =

Species of moss animal

Paludicella articulata is a species of freshwater moss animal in the family Paludicellidae. It is found in Europe, Asia, and North and South America.

== Description ==
Colonies can grow to a maximum diameter of 10 cm (4 in). They have chitin shine that is similar to the beetles shield. The color is brown. Their life cycle is usually a few months. They breed in spring, at which time the temperature is above 10 °C (50 °F), and die in October, when the temperature drops to about 9 °C (48 °F).

== Habitat ==
The species live in a colony, which always grow on a place where they are sheltered from silt. In Norway, it lives in lakes up to 1,397 metres (4,583 ft) above sea level.
