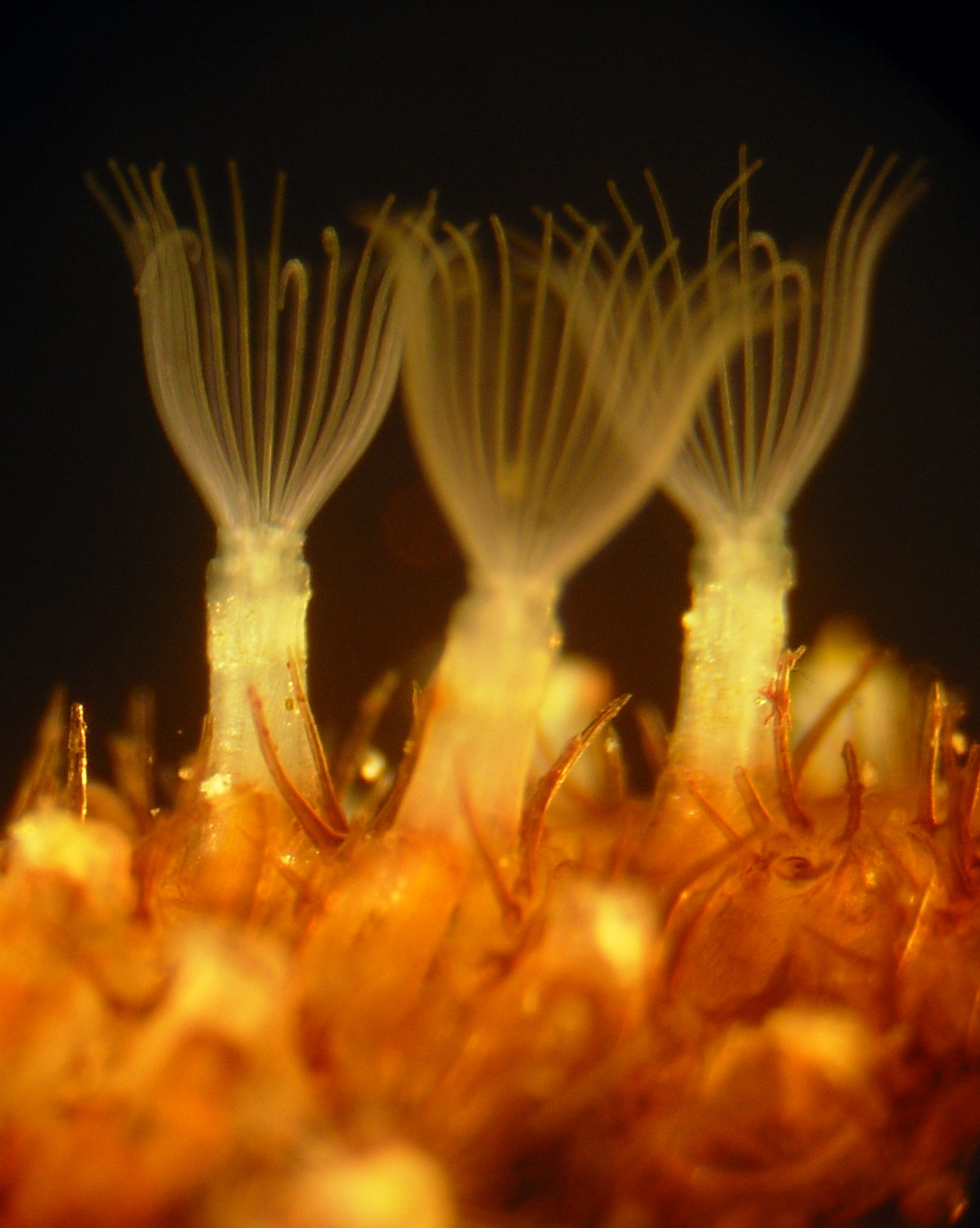

Scientific classification
- Domain: Eukaryota
- Kingdom: Animalia
- Phylum: Bryozoa
- Class: Gymnolaemata
- Order: Ctenostomatida
- Family: Flustrellidridae
- Genus: Flustrellidra
- Species: F. hispida

Binomial name
- Flustrellidra hispida (Fabricius, 1780)

= Flustrellidra hispida =

Species of moss animal

Flustrellidra hispida is a species of colonial bryozoan in the order Ctenostomatida.

Encrusting colonies are loosely attached to substrata, forming thick, lobed, brown to yellowish patches with a "furry" appearance due to dense spines. Colonies comprise sterile and protandrous hermaphrodite zooids incubating non-feeding pseudocyphonautes larva in the modified tentacle sheath.

Flustrellidra hispida is an amphiboreal species, widely distributed in the northern Atlantic. They live in a temperate climate and prefer a water temperature not exceeding 15 °C and normal salinity.
