= Arachnidiidae =

Scientific classification
- Kingdom: Animalia
- Phylum: Bryozoa
- Class: Gymnolaemata
- Order: Ctenostomatida
- Superfamily: Arachnidioidea
- Family: Arachnidiidae; Hincks, 1880

Family of bryozoans

Arachnidiidae is a family of bryozoans belonging to the order Ctenostomatida.

== Genera ==
- Arachnidia Hincks, 1859
- Arachnidium Hincks, 1859
- Arachnoidea Moore, 1903
- Arachnoidella d'Hondt, 1983
- Arachnoidia Moore, 1903
- Cardoarachnidium Taylor, 1990
- Cryptoarachnidium Jebram, 1973
- Parachnoidea d'Hondt, 1979
- Pierrella Wilson & Taylor, 2012
