= Flustrellidra =

Scientific classification
- Kingdom: Animalia
- Phylum: Bryozoa
- Class: Gymnolaemata
- Order: Ctenostomatida
- Family: Flustrellidridae
- Genus: Flustrellidra; Bassler, 1953

Genus of bryozoans

Flustrellidra is a genus of bryozoans belonging to the family Flustrellidridae.

The species of this genus are found in Northern Hemisphere.

Species:

- Flustrellidra akkeshiensis Mawatari, 1971
- Flustrellidra armata Grischenko, Seo & Min, 2010
- Flustrellidra aspinosa (Mawatari, 1953)
- Flustrellidra cervicornis (Robertson, 1900)
- Flustrellidra corniculata (Smitt, 1872)
- Flustrellidra filispina Mawatari, 1971
- Flustrellidra gigantea (Silén, 1947)
- Flustrellidra hispida (Fabricius, 1780)
- Flustrellidra kurilensis (Mawatari, 1953)
- Flustrellidra prouhoi (d'Hondt, 1974)
- Flustrellidra spinifera (O'Donoghue & O'Donoghue, 1923)
- Flustrellidra stolonifera (Okada, 1921)
- Flustrellidra vegae (Silén, 1947)
