= Monobryozoon =

Scientific classification
- Kingdom: Animalia
- Phylum: Bryozoa
- Class: Gymnolaemata
- Order: Ctenostomatida
- Family: Monobryozoidae
- Genus: Monobryozoon; Rémane, 1936

Genus of bryozoans

Monobryozoon is a genus of bryozoans, the only one belonging to the family Monobryozoidae. The species of this genus are found in Northern Europe. These species, as their name suggests (from Ancient Greek "μόνος" ("alone"), and the roots of the respective phylum Bryozoa, "βρύον" ("moss") and "ζῷα" ("animal")) are, other than Aethozoidae, unique in the bryozoan phylum, as they are solitary organisms, rather than colonies. They are considered almost mythical among scientists as they are very rare. As of 2024, the species M. ambulans had only been discovered three different times. The species M. bulbosum was found once in 1972, and the last species, M. sandersi, was reported in 1981, but has yet to be confirmed, and remains unsubstantiated. A study from 2024 has proposed Monobryozoon to be included within the genus Alcyonidium, therein closest to A. disciforme between the sampled species, with the use of genome skimming.

Species:

- Monobryozoon ambulans Remane, 1936
- Monobryozoon bulbosum Ott, 1972
- Monobryozoon sandersi d'Hondt & Hayward, 1981
