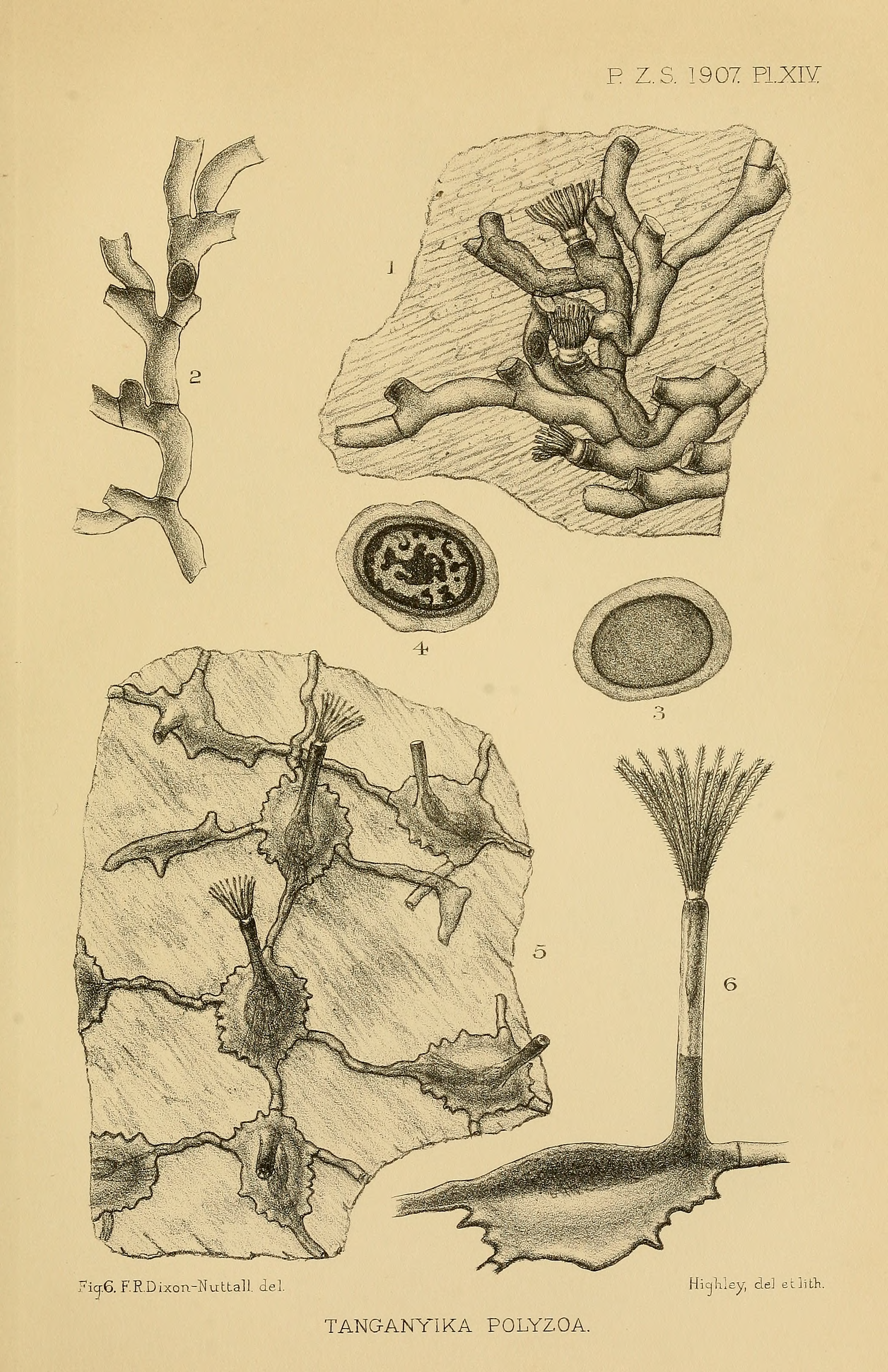
- Bryozoans from Lake Tanganyika

Scientific classification
- Domain: Eukaryota
- Kingdom: Animalia
- Phylum: Bryozoa
- Class: Gymnolaemata
- Order: Ctenostomatida
- Family: Arachnidiidae
- Genus: Arachnoidea; Moore, 1903
- Species: A. raylankesteri

Binomial name
- Arachnoidea raylankesteri Moore, 1903

= Arachnoidea raylankesteri =

Species of bryozoan

Arachnoidea is a monotypic genus of bryozoans belonging to the family Arachnidiidae. The only species is Arachnoidea raylankesteri.

The species is found in Australia.
