= Ascus (bryozoa) =

Suborder of moss animals

The ascus is a diagnostic morphological feature of the bryozoan suborder Ascophora (hence the name of the suborder). It is a water-filled sac of frontal membrane opening (ascopore) at or near the zooid orifice. It functions as a hydrostatic system by allowing water into the space below the inflexible, calcified frontal wall (covering their whole frontal surface apart from the orifice) when the zooid everts its polypide (feeding tentacles) by muscles pulling the frontal membrane inwards (non-ascophoran cheilostomes do not need this structure as their frontal wall is not calcified and thus flexible). The ascus, along with a calcified frontal shield, define ascophoran bryozoa.
