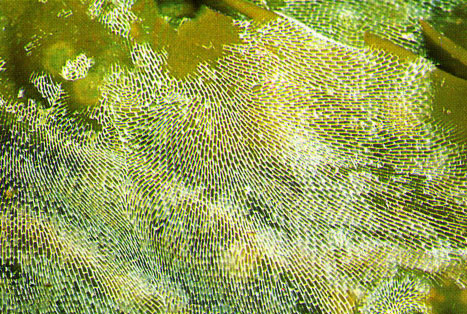

Scientific classification
- Kingdom: Animalia
- Phylum: Bryozoa
- Class: Gymnolaemata
- Order: Cheilostomatida
- Family: Membraniporidae
- Genus: Membranipora
- Species: M. membranacea

Binomial name
- Membranipora membranacea Linnaeus, 1767

= Membranipora membranacea =

Species of moss animal

Membranipora membranacea is a very widely distributed species of marine bryozoan known from the Atlantic and Pacific Oceans, usually in temperate zone environments. This bryozoan is a colonial organism characterized by a thin, mat-like encrustation, white to gray in color. It may be known colloquially as the coffin box, sea-mat, kelp lace bryozoan or lacy crust bryozoan and is often abundantly found encrusting seaweeds, particularly kelps.

== Distribution ==
Northeast Atlantic including the Baltic Sea, English Channel, Mediterranean Sea and North Sea. Also native to the North Pacific coastline of North America from Alaska to California. The species was first recorded on the Atlantic coastline of the U.S. in 1987 in the Gulf of Maine. In Canada's Atlantic coast, it was first observed in Nova Scotia during the early 1990s, and had reached Newfoundland and Labrador by 2002. It now commonly occurs along the Northwest Atlantic from Long Island Sound to northern Newfoundland, including coastal Quebec, New Brunswick, and Prince Edward Island.

== Morphology and physiology ==
Membranipora membranacea colonies consist of individual organisms called zooids, each with a chitinous exoskeleton which is secreted by the epidermis. This exoskeleton, hardened with calcium carbonate, is known as the zooecium, which not only serves to protect the internal structures of the organism, but also keeps the individual permanently attached to the substrate and neighboring zooids. Zooids within a colony can communicate via pores in their interconnecting walls, through which coelomic fluid can be exchanged.

The internal, living portion of the zooid is known as the polypide, whose walls are formed by the outer epidermis and inner peritoneum. The lophophore, a ring of ciliated tentacles, protrudes from the polypide to feed. When not feeding, the lophophore retracts into the polypide through the tentacular sheath. The lophophore is controlled by the zooid's nervous system, which consists of a ganglion at the lophophore base. This ganglion is responsible for motor and sensory impulses to and from the lophophore, as well as the epithelium and digestive tract. The lophophore retractor is the muscle which controls the movement of the lophophore.

This species does not have the ovicells or avicularium seen in most other members of this phylum.

== Natural history ==
=== Life cycle ===
Membranipora membranacea begins its life cycle as a plankton-feeding larva, triangular in shape. After several weeks, the larva attach to a substrate and undergo metamorphosis. The larvae typically settle on their preferred substrates in May, and then the colony undergoes growth, stasis and reproduction, shrinkage, and senescence around September, except in regions where temperature allows them to persist further into the winter. The presence of conspecifics may cause a colony to stop growing and begin stasis and reproduction early. The presence of predators also reduces growth of a colony.

=== Reproduction ===
Colonies of M. membranacea are protandrous sequential hermaphrodites, where colonies transition from male to female reproductive stages, allowing fertilization to occur between colonies or within colonies. Fertilization takes places in the coelomic fluid of female colonies, and the eggs are released through an opening in the lophophore known as the coelomophore. Reproduction or growth of the colony can also take place by budding in a radial pattern from the first established zooid, the ancestrula.

== Ecology ==
=== Habitat ===
M. membranacea prefers shallow marine habitats between the mid intertidal to the shallow sublittoral. It may also be found in brackish water. It is typically found attached in colonies to seaweed, shells, or artificial substrates.

=== Feeding ===
M. membranacea can eat food particles such as bacteria, flagellates, diatoms, and other small, planktonic organisms by extracting them from the water with their lophophore. They can also supplement their diet with dissolved organic nutrients through the absorptive epidermis.

=== Predation ===
Nudibranchs or sea slugs are the primary predators of M. membranacea. To defend themselves against these predators, the M. membranacea produce chitinous spines which protrude from the corners of the zooid. These spines make it difficult for the nudibranchs to access the polypide of the zooid. However, the energy and resources needed to produce the spines may result in decreased growth and reproduction of the colony.

== Ecological significance ==
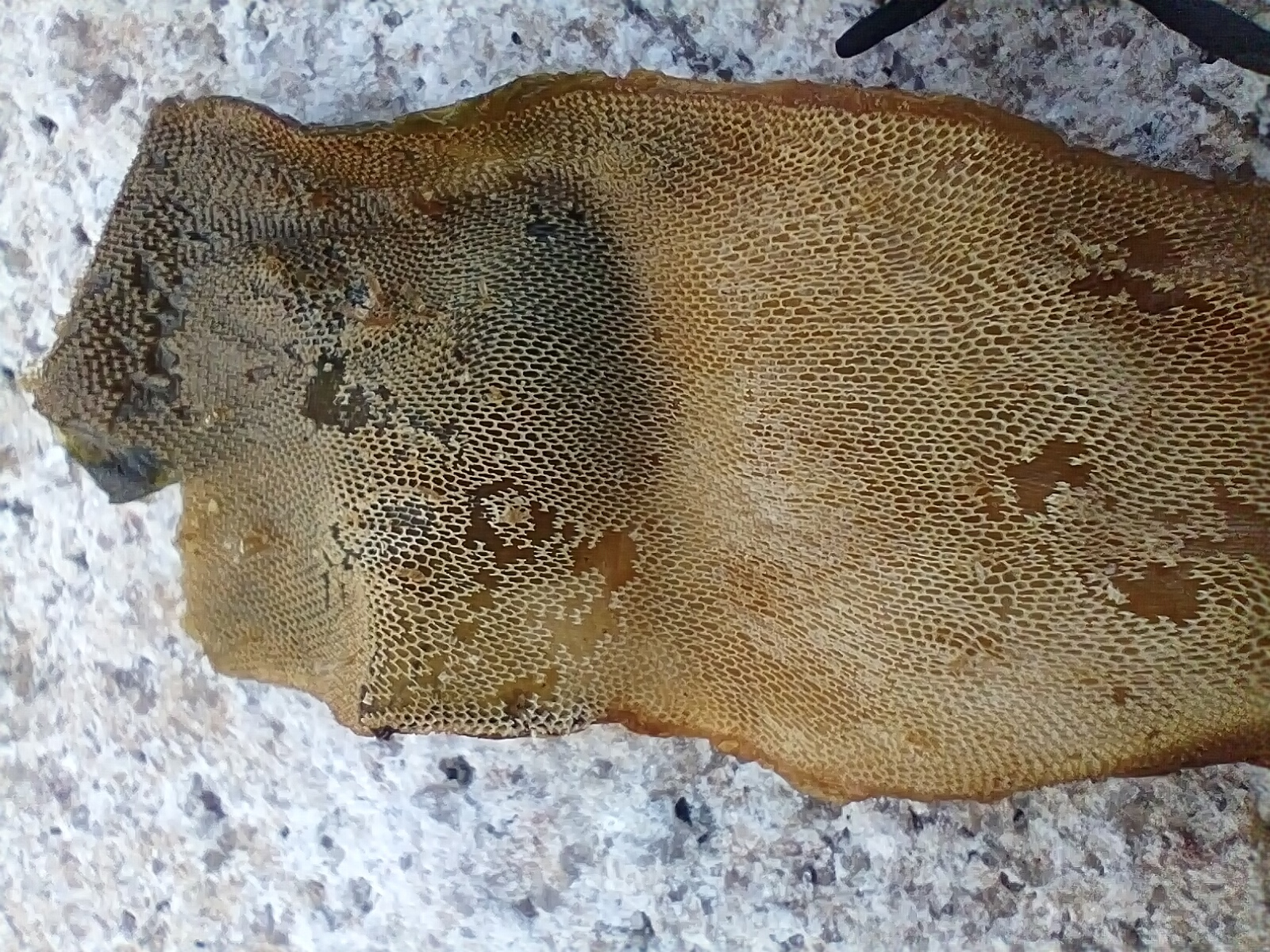
M. membranacea on a kelp blade

M. membranacea has become an invasive species in many places, and is believed to have a potentially negative impact on marine ecosystems by limiting the ability of seaweeds to reproduce, specifically by interfering with spore release from the kelp blade. The colonies of this bryozoan are also known to interrupt nutrient uptake by seaweed.

M. membranacea also decreases density and size of kelp plants within kelp beds by increasing tissue loss and blade breakage. Additionally, M. membranacea also affects photosynthetic processes in kelp, since their encrustations may result in reduced concentrations of the primary and accessory pigments in the kelp blade tissue.
