= Aeverrillioidea =

Scientific classification
- Kingdom: Animalia
- Phylum: Bryozoa
- Class: Gymnolaemata
- Order: Ctenostomatida
- Suborder: Stoloniferina
- Superfamily: Aeverrillioidea d'Hondt, 1983

Families
- Aeverrilliidae Jebram, 1973; Farrellidae d'Hondt, 1983

Superfamily of bryozoans

Aeverrillioidea is a superfamily of bryozoans belonging to the order Ctenostomatida.
