= Arachnidium (bryozoan) =

Scientific classification
- Kingdom: Animalia
- Phylum: Bryozoa
- Class: Gymnolaemata
- Order: Ctenostomatida
- Family: Arachnidiidae
- Genus: Arachnidium

Species
- A. fibrosum Hincks, 1880

Genus of moss animals

Arachnidium are a genus of colonial ctenostome bryozoans. They lack a calcified cuticle and form dense encrusting colonies on barnacles or other shelled organisms. Individual zooids are roughly 150 microns in size, have a lophophore with about 13 tentacles, and have about 10 to 11 connections to other zooids in the colony.
