= Paludicellidae =

Scientific classification
- Kingdom: Animalia
- Phylum: Bryozoa
- Class: Gymnolaemata
- Order: Ctenostomatida
- Family: Paludicellidae

Family of bryozoans

Paludicellidae is a family of bryozoans belonging to the order Ctenostomatida.

Genera:

- Alcyonella Lamarck, 1816
- Paludicella Gervais, 1836
