= Flustrellidridae =

Scientific classification
- Kingdom: Animalia
- Phylum: Bryozoa
- Class: Gymnolaemata
- Order: Ctenostomatida
- Family: Flustrellidridae

Family of bryozoans

Flustrellidridae is a family of bryozoans belonging to the order Ctenostomatida.

Genera:

- Elzerina Lamouroux, 1816
- Flustrellidra Bassler, 1953
- Flustrellidrella d'Hondt, 1983
- Neobockiella d'Hondt, 1983
- Neoflustrellidra d'Hondt, 1976
