= Avicularium =

Modified, non-feeding zooid

The avicularium (pl. avicularia) in cheilostome bryozoans is a modified, non-feeding zooid. The operculum, which normally closes the orifice when the zooids tentacles are retracted, has been modified to become a mandible. Strong muscles operate it. The polypide is greatly reduced, and the individual receives nourishment from neighboring zooids. The shape of the avicularian zooid can be identical to the feeding autozooid, but is usually elongated in the direction of the mandible.

Avicularia are categorised by their position relative to the autozooids. Vicarious avicularia effectively replace an autozooid in the colony structure and are usually a similar size and shape as the autozooids. Interzooidal avicularia are wedged between autozooids but do not replace an autozooid. Adventitious avicularia are placed somewhere on the external (frontal) wall of an autozooid and are usually much smaller. The 'birds-head' avicularium (e.g. Bugula) is elevated above the colony by a stalk (peduncle).

A zooid where the operculum is modified into a very long, hair-like structure is called a vibraculum.

The cyclostome family Eleidae, which convergently evolved an opercular structure during the Early Cretaceous to Paleocene, also possess avicularia-like zooids.
