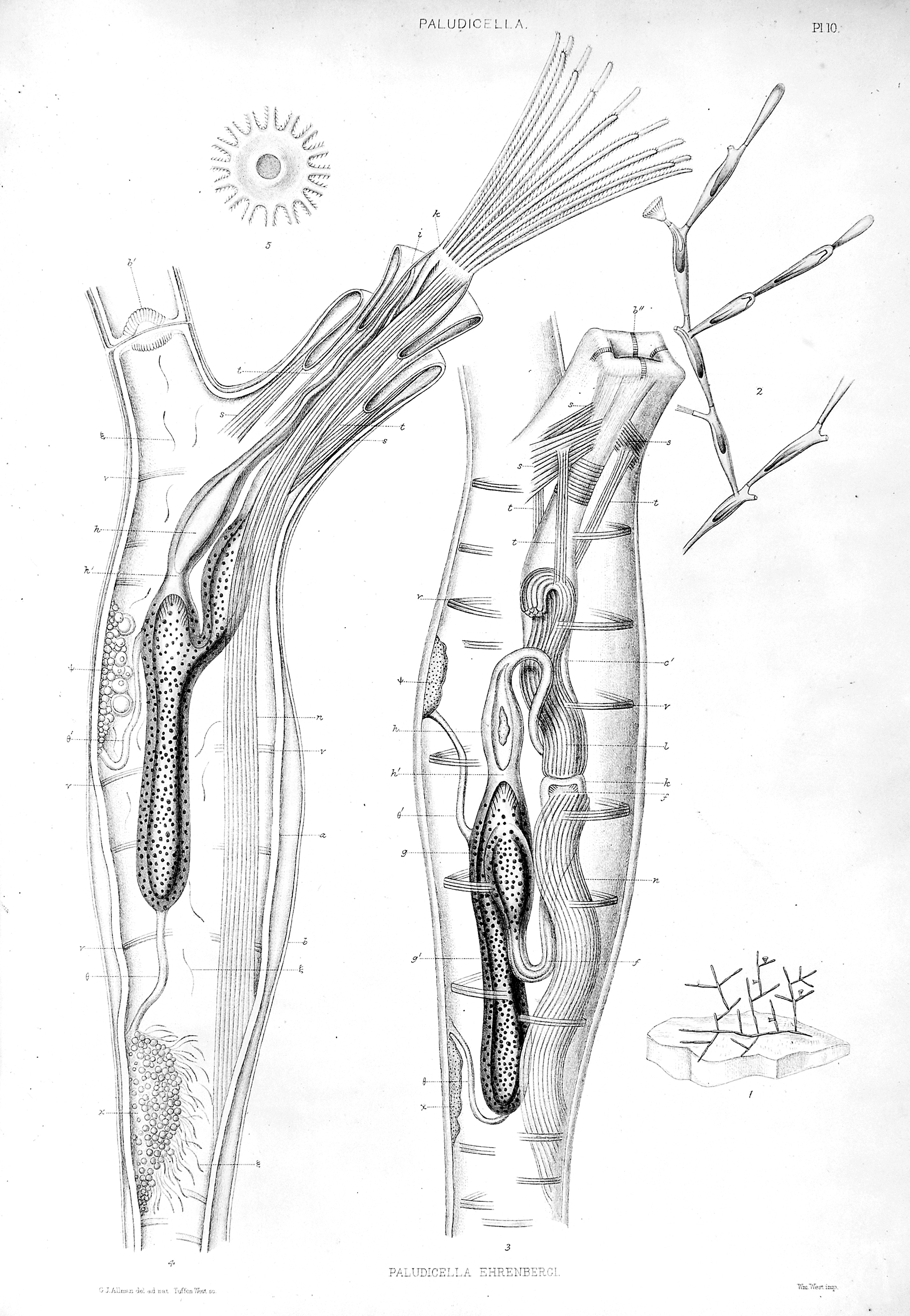
- Paludicella articulata

Scientific classification
- Kingdom: Animalia
- Phylum: Bryozoa
- Class: Gymnolaemata
- Order: Ctenostomatida
- Family: Paludicellidae
- Genus: Paludicella; Gervais, 1836

= Paludicella =

Genus of moss animals

Paludicella is a genus of freshwater bryozoans in the family Paludicellidae.

== Species ==
There are two species:

- Paludicella articulata (Ehrenberg, 1831)
- Paludicella pentagonalis Annandale, 1916
