= Victorelloidea =

Scientific classification
- Domain: Eukaryota
- Kingdom: Animalia
- Phylum: Bryozoa
- Class: Gymnolaemata
- Order: Ctenostomatida
- Suborder: Victorellina; Jebram, 1973
- Superfamily: Victorelloidea; Hincks, 1880

Superfamily of bryozoans

Victorelloidea is a superfamily of bryozoans belonging to the order Ctenostomatida. It is the only superfamily in its monotypic suborder, Victorellina.

The following families are accepted within the superfamily, according to the World Register of Marine Species:

- Aethozoidae d'Hondt, 1983
- Immergentiidae Silén, 1946
- Nolellidae Harmer, 1915
- Sundanellidae Jebram, 1973
- Victorellidae Hincks, 1880
