= Aethozoidae =

Scientific classification
- Kingdom: Animalia
- Phylum: Bryozoa
- Class: Gymnolaemata
- Order: Ctenostomatida
- Superfamily: Victorelloidea
- Family: Aethozoidae d'Hondt, 1983

Family of bryozoans

Aethozoidae is a family of bryozoans belonging to the order Ctenostomatida.

The following genera are accepted within the family, according to the World Register of Marine Species:

- Aethozooides Schwaha, Bernhard, Edgcomb & Todaro, 2019
- Aethozoon Hayward, 1978
- Franzenella d'Hondt, 1983
- Solella Schwaha, Bernhard, Edgcomb & Todaro, 2019
