= Stoloniferina =

Scientific classification
- Kingdom: Animalia
- Phylum: Bryozoa
- Class: Gymnolaemata
- Order: Ctenostomatida
- Suborder: Stoloniferina

Superfamilies
- Aeverrillioidea d'Hondt, 1983; Arachnidioidea Hincks, 1880; Hislopioidea Jullien, 1885; Penetrantioidea Silén, 1946; Terebriporoidea d'Orbigny, 1847; Triticelloidea Sars, 1873; Walkerioidea Hincks, 1877

Suborder of bryozoans

Stoloniferina is a suborder of bryozoans belonging to the order Ctenostomatida.
