= Operculum (bryozoa) =

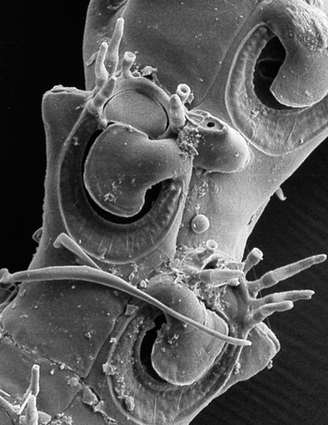
Opercula visible in an unbleached branch segment of Cradoscrupocellaria insularis

In the bryozoan order Cheilostomatida, the operculum is a calcareous or chitinous lid-like structure that protects the opening through which the polypide protrudes.

Many species have modified the operculum in specialized zooids (avicularia) to form a range of mandibles (probably for defense) or hair-like setae (probably for cleaning, or in some unattached species, such as Selenaria, for locomotion).

The cyclostome family Eleidae also convergently evolved an opercular structure during the Early Cretaceous to Paleocene.
