= Polypide =

The polypide in bryozoans encompasses most of the organs and tissues of each individual zooid. This includes the tentacles, tentacle sheath, U-shaped digestive tract, musculature and nerve cells. It is housed in the zooidal exoskeleton, which in cyclostomes is tubular and in cheilostomes is box-shaped. Polypides can undergo cycles of regression and regeneration, in which the zooid forms a new polypide as the old one accumulates waste and dies.

== See also ==
Bryozoan Anatomy
