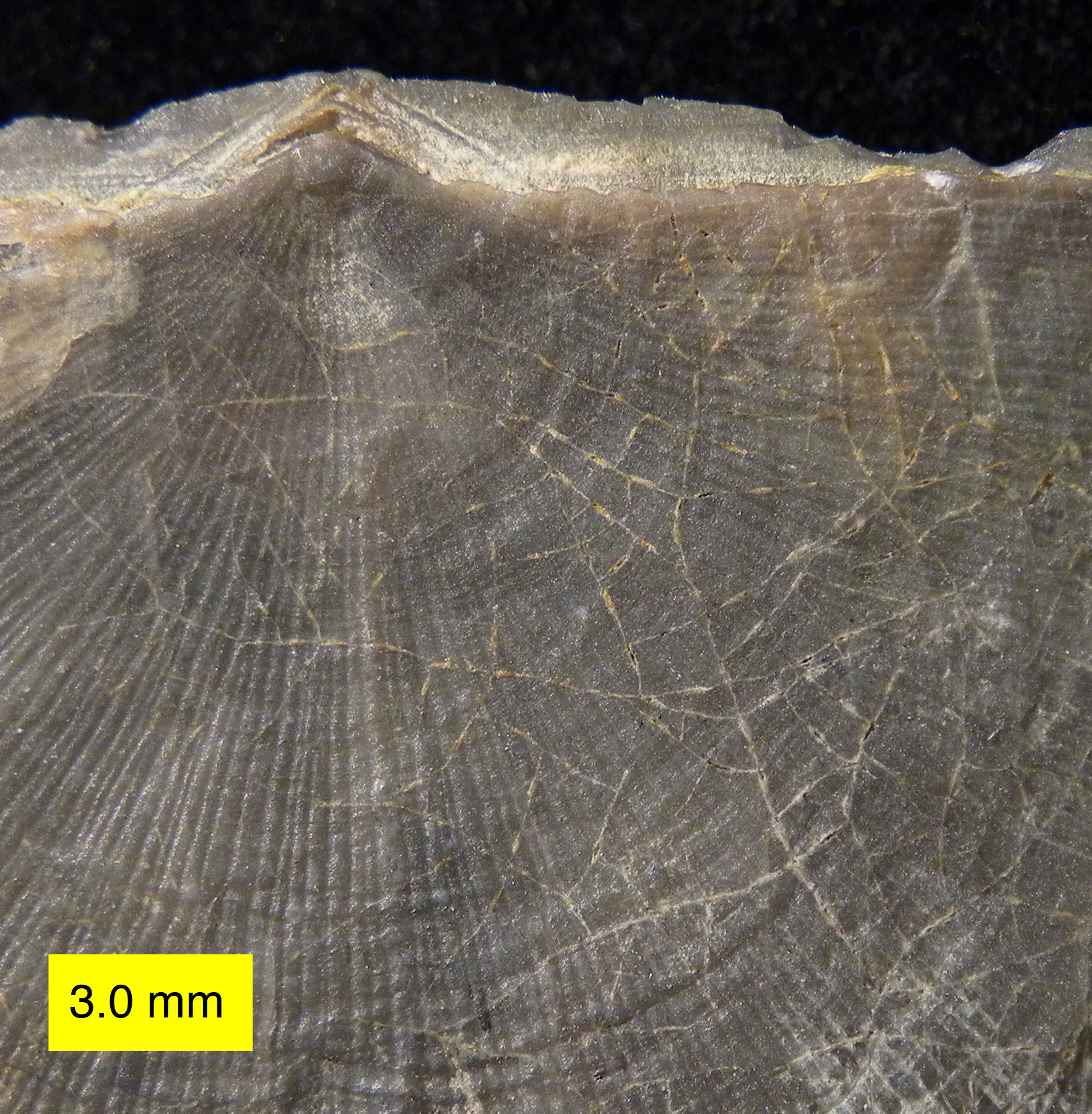
- Ropalonaria venosa, an etching of an Ordovician ctenostome bryozoan on a strophomenid brachiopod valve.

Scientific classification
- Kingdom: Animalia
- Phylum: Bryozoa
- Class: Gymnolaemata
- Order: Ctenostomatida; Busk, 1852

Suborders and superfamilies
- Suborders: Alcyonidiina d'Hondt, 1985; Flustrellidrina; Paludicellina Allman, 1856; Stoloniferina Ehlers, 1876; Vesicularina Hincks, 1880; Victorellina Jebram, 1973; Superfamilies: Benedeniporoidea Delage & Hérouard, 1897

Synonyms
- Carnosa Gray, 1841; Ctenostomata Busk, 1852

= Ctenostomatida =

Order of moss animals

The Ctenostomatida are an order of bryozoans in the class Gymnolaemata. The great majority of ctenostome species are marine, although Paludicella inhabits fresh water. They are distinguished from their close relatives, the cheilostomes, by their lack of a calcified exoskeleton. Instead, the exoskeleton is chitinous, gelatinous, or composed only of a soft membrane, and always lacks an operculum. Colonies of ctenostomes are often composed of elongated, branch-like stolons, although more compact forms also exist.
