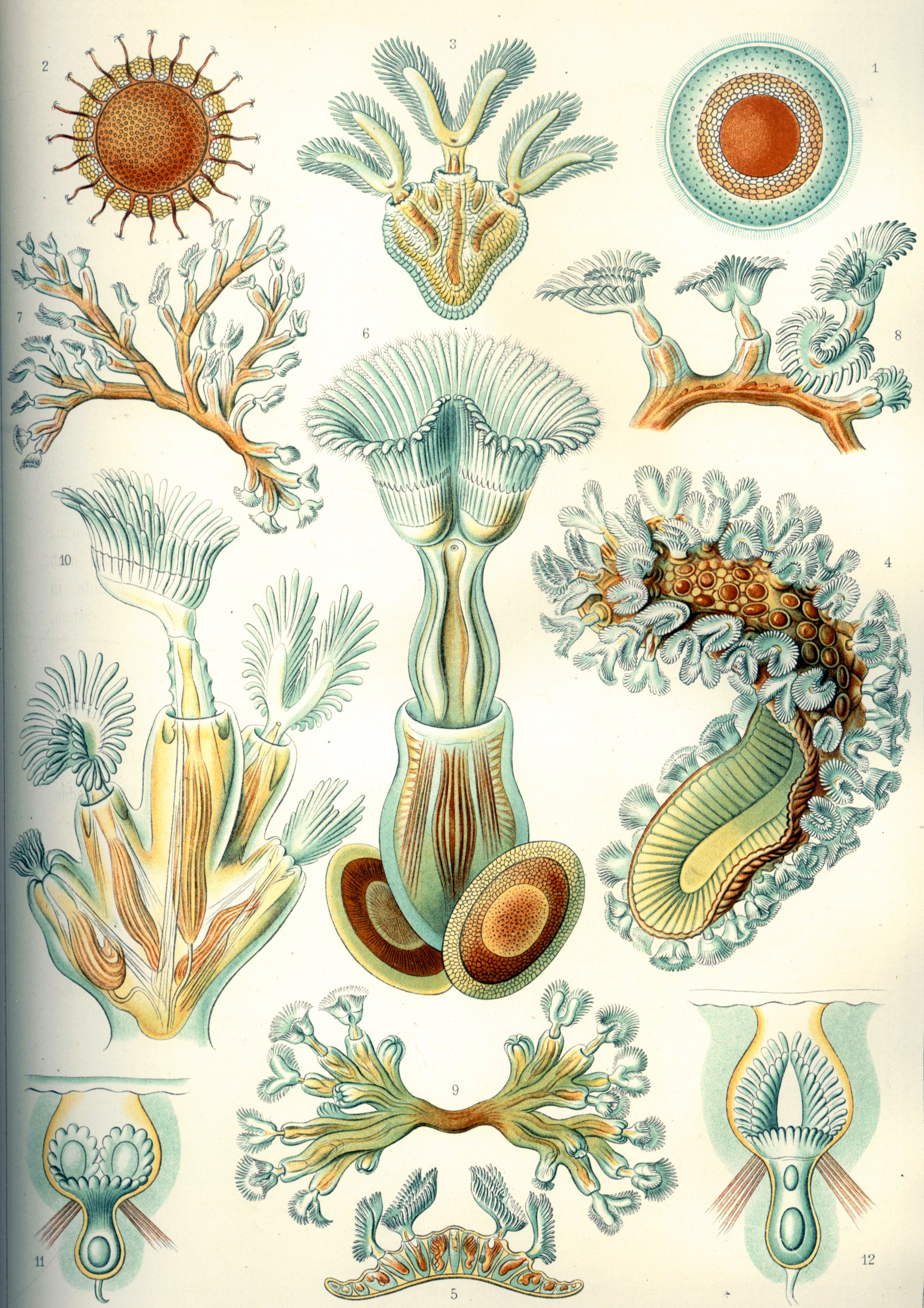
- "Bryozoa", from Ernst Haeckel's Kunstformen der Natur, 1904

Scientific classification
- Kingdom: Animalia
- Clade: Lophophorata
- Phylum: Bryozoa; Ehrenberg, 1831

Classes
- See text.

Synonyms
- Ectoprocta Nitsche, 1869 (formerly subphylum of Bryozoa)

= Bryozoa =

Bryozoa Temporal range: Cambrian Stage 3–Recent

Phylum of colonial aquatic invertebrates called moss animals

The Bryozoa (also known as the Polyzoa, Ectoprocta or commonly as moss animals) are a phylum of simple, aquatic invertebrate animals, nearly all living in sedentary colonies. Typically about 0.5 millimetres (1/64 in) long, they have a special feeding structure called a lophophore, a "crown" of tentacles used for filter feeding. The bryozoa are classified as the marine bryozoa (Stenolaemata), freshwater bryozoa (Phylactolaemata), and mostly-marine bryozoa (Gymnolaemata), a few members of which prefer brackish water. Most marine bryozoans live in tropical waters, but a few are found in oceanic trenches and polar waters. 5,869 living species of bryozoa are known. Originally all of the crown group Bryozoa were colonial, but as an adaptation to a mesopsammal (interstitial spaces in marine sand) life or to deep-sea habitats, secondarily solitary forms have since evolved. Five genera are solitary: Aethozooides, Aethozoon, Franzenella, Solella, which together make up the family Aethozoidae, and Monobryozoon, which has a statocyst-like organ with a supposed excretory function.

The terms Polyzoa and Bryozoa were introduced in 1830 and 1831, respectively. Soon after it was named, another group of animals was discovered whose filtering mechanism looked similar, so it was included in Bryozoa until 1869, when the two groups were noted to be very different internally. The new group was given the name "Entoprocta", while the original Bryozoa were called "Ectoprocta". Disagreements about terminology persisted well into the 20th century, but "Bryozoa" is now the generally accepted term.

Colonies take a variety of forms, including fans, bushes and sheets. Single animals, called zooids, live throughout the colony and are not fully independent. These individuals can have unique and diverse functions. All colonies have "autozooids", which are responsible for feeding, excretion, and supplying nutrients to the colony through diverse channels. Some classes have specialist zooids like hatcheries for fertilized eggs, colonial defence structures, and root-like attachment structures. Cheilostomata is the most diverse order of bryozoan, possibly because its members have the widest range of specialist zooids. They have mineralized exoskeletons and form single-layered sheets which encrust over surfaces, and some colonies can creep very slowly by using spiny defensive zooids as legs.

Each zooid consists of a "cystid", which provides the body wall and produces the exoskeleton, and a "polypide", which holds the organs. Zooids have no special excretory organs, and autozooids' polypides are scrapped when they become overloaded with waste products; usually the body wall then grows a replacement polypide. Their gut is U-shaped, with the mouth inside the crown of tentacles and the anus outside it. Zooids of all the freshwater species are simultaneous hermaphrodites. Although those of many marine species function first as males and then as females, their colonies always contain a combination of zooids that are in their male and female stages. All species emit sperm into the water. Some also release ova into the water, while others capture sperm via their tentacles to fertilize their ova internally. In some species the larvae have large yolks, go to feed, and quickly settle on a surface. Others produce larvae that have little yolk but swim and feed for a few days before settling. After settling, all larvae undergo a radical metamorphosis that destroys and rebuilds almost all the internal tissues. Freshwater species also produce statoblasts that lie dormant until conditions are favorable, which enables a colony's lineage to survive even if severe conditions kill the mother colony.

Predators of marine bryozoans include sea slugs (nudibranchs), fish, sea urchins, sea spiders, crustaceans, mites and starfish. Freshwater bryozoans are preyed on by snails, insects, and fish. In Thailand, many populations of one freshwater species have been wiped out by an introduced species of snail. Membranipora membranacea, a fast-growing invasive bryozoan off the northeast and northwest coasts of the US, has reduced kelp forests so much that it has affected local fish and invertebrate populations. Bryozoans have spread diseases to fish farms and fishermen. Chemicals extracted from a marine bryozoan species have been investigated for treatment of cancer and Alzheimer's disease, but analyses have not been encouraging.

The earliest mineralized skeletons of bryozoans are known from the early Cambrian. Early fossils are mainly of erect forms, but encrusting forms gradually became dominant. It is uncertain whether the phylum is monophyletic. Bryozoans' evolutionary relationships to other phyla are also unclear, partly because scientists' view of the family tree of animals is mainly influenced by better-known phyla. Both morphological and molecular phylogeny analyses disagree over bryozoans' relationships with entoprocts, about whether bryozoans should be grouped with brachiopods and phoronids in Lophophorata, and whether bryozoans should be considered protostomes or deuterostomes.

== Description ==
=== Distinguishing features ===
Bryozoans, phoronids and brachiopods strain food out of the water by means of a lophophore, a "crown" of hollow tentacles. Bryozoans form colonies consisting of clones called zooids that are typically about 0.5 mm (1/64 in) long. Phoronids resemble bryozoan zooids but are 2 to 20 cm (1 to 8 in) long and, although they often grow in clumps, do not form colonies consisting of clones. Brachiopods, generally thought to be closely related to bryozoans and phoronids, are distinguished by having shells rather like those of bivalves. All three of these phyla have a coelom, an internal cavity lined by mesothelium. Some encrusting bryozoan colonies with mineralized exoskeletons look very like small corals. However, bryozoan colonies are founded by an ancestrula, which is round rather than shaped like a normal zooid of that species. On the other hand, the founding polyp of a coral has a shape like that of its daughter polyps, and coral zooids have no coelom or lophophore.

Entoprocts, another phylum of filter-feeders, look rather like bryozoans but their lophophore-like feeding structure has solid tentacles, their anus lies inside rather than outside the base of the "crown" and they have no coelom.

Summary of distinguishing features
	Bryozoa (Ectoprocta)	Other lophophorates		Other Lophotrochozoa	Similar-looking phyla	
	Bryozoa (Ectoprocta)	Phoronida	Brachiopoda	Annelida, Mollusca	Entoprocta	Corals (class in phylum Cnidaria)
Coelom	Three-part, if the cavity of the epistome is included	Three-part		One per segment in basic form; merged in some taxa	none	
Formation of coelom	Uncertain because metamorphosis of larvae into adults makes this impossible to trace	Enterocoely		Schizocoely	not applicable	
Lophophore	With hollow tentacles			none	Similar-looking feeding structure, but with solid tentacles	none
Feeding current	From tips to bases of tentacles			not applicable	From bases to tips of tentacles	not applicable
Multiciliated cells in epithelium	Yes	no		Yes		not applicable
Position of anus	Outside base of lophophore		Varies, none in some species	Rear end, but none in Siboglinidae	Inside base of lophophore-like organ	none
Colonial	Colonies of clones in most; one solitary genus and family	Sessile species often form clumps, but with no active co-operation			Colonies of clones in some species; some solitary species	Colonies of clones
Shape of founder zooid	Round, unlike normal zooids	not applicable			Same as other zooids	
Mineralized exoskeletons	Some taxa	no	Bivalve-like shells	Some sessile annelids build mineralized tubes; most molluscs have shells, but most modern cephalopods have internal shells or none.	no	Some taxa

=== Types of zooid ===
All bryozoans are colonial except for one genus, Monobryozoon, and family, Aethozoidae. Individual members of a bryozoan colony are about 0.5 mm (1/64 in) long and are known as zooids, since they are not fully independent animals. All colonies contain feeding zooids, known as autozooids. Those of some groups also contain non-feeding heterozooids, also known as polymorphic zooids, which serve a variety of functions other than feeding; colony members are genetically identical and co-operate, rather like the organs of larger animals. What type of zooid grows where in a colony is determined by chemical signals from the colony as a whole or sometimes in response to the scent of predators or rival colonies.

The bodies of all types have two main parts. The cystid consists of the body wall and whatever type of exoskeleton is secreted by the epidermis. The exoskeleton may be organic (chitin, polysaccharide or protein) or made of the mineral calcium carbonate. The latter is always absent in freshwater species. The body wall consists of the epidermis, basal lamina (a mat of non-cellular material), connective tissue, muscles, and the mesothelium which lines the coelom (main body cavity) – except that in one class, the mesothelium is split into two separate layers, the inner one forming a membranous sac that floats freely and contains the coelom, and the outer one attached to the body wall and enclosing the membranous sac in a pseudocoelom. The other main part of the bryozoan body, known as the polypide and situated almost entirely within the cystid, contains the nervous system, digestive system, some specialized muscles and the feeding apparatus or other specialized organs that take the place of the feeding apparatus.

==== Feeding zooids ====
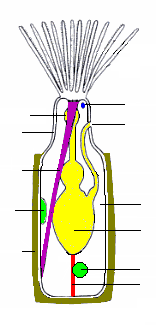
A generalized autozooid

The most common type of zooid is the feeding autozooid, in which the polypide bears a "crown" of hollow tentacles called a lophophore, which captures food particles from the water. In all colonies a large percentage of zooids are autozooids, and some consist entirely of autozooids, some of which also engage in reproduction.

The basic shape of the "crown" is a full circle. Among the freshwater bryozoans (Phylactolaemata) the crown appears U-shaped, but this impression is created by a deep dent in the rim of the crown, which has no gap in the fringe of tentacles. The sides of the tentacles bear fine hairs called cilia, whose beating drives a water current from the tips of the tentacles to their bases, where it exits. Food particles that collide with the tentacles are trapped by mucus, and further cilia on the inner surfaces of the tentacles move the particles towards the mouth in the center. The method used by ectoprocts is called "upstream collecting", as food particles are captured before they pass through the field of cilia that creates the feeding current. This method is also used by phoronids, brachiopods and pterobranchs.

The lophophore and mouth are mounted on a flexible tube called the "invert", which can be turned inside-out and withdrawn into the polypide, rather like the finger of a rubber glove; in this position the lophophore lies inside the invert and is folded like the spokes of an umbrella. The invert is withdrawn, sometimes within 60 milliseconds, by a pair of retractor muscles that are anchored at the far end of the cystid. Sensors at the tips of the tentacles may check for signs of danger before the invert and lophophore are fully extended. Extension is driven by an increase in internal fluid pressure, which species with flexible exoskeletons produce by contracting circular muscles that lie just inside the body wall, while species with a membranous sac use circular muscles to squeeze this. Some species with rigid exoskeletons have a flexible membrane that replaces part of the exoskeleton, and transverse muscles anchored on the far side of the exoskeleton increase the fluid pressure by pulling the membrane inwards. In others there is no gap in the protective skeleton, and the transverse muscles pull on a flexible sac which is connected to the water outside by a small pore; the expansion of the sac increases the pressure inside the body and pushes the invert and lophophore out. In some species the retracted invert and lophophore are protected by an operculum ("lid"), which is closed by muscles and opened by fluid pressure. In one class, a hollow lobe called the "epistome" overhangs the mouth.

The gut is U-shaped, running from the mouth, in the center of the lophophore, down into the animal's interior and then back to the anus, which is located on the invert, outside and usually below the lophophore. A network of strands of mesothelium called "funiculi" ("little ropes") connects the mesothelium covering the gut with that lining the body wall. The wall of each strand is made of mesothelium, and surrounds a space filled with fluid, thought to be blood. A colony's zooids are connected, enabling autozooids to share food with each other and with any non-feeding heterozooids. The method of connection varies between the different classes of bryozoans, ranging from quite large gaps in the body walls to small pores through which nutrients are passed by funiculi.

There is a nerve ring round the pharynx (throat) and a ganglion that serves as a brain to one side of this. Nerves run from the ring and ganglion to the tentacles and to the rest of the body. Bryozoans have no specialized sense organs, but cilia on the tentacles act as sensors. Members of the genus Bugula grow towards the sun, and therefore must be able to detect light. In colonies of some species, signals are transmitted between zooids through nerves that pass through pores in the body walls, and coordinate activities such as feeding and the retraction of lophophores.

The solitary individuals of Monobryozoon are autozooids with pear-shaped bodies. The wider ends have up to 15 short, muscular projections by which the animals anchor themselves to sand or gravel and pull themselves through the sediments.

==== Avicularia and vibracula ====
Some authorities use the term avicularia (plural of avicularium) to refer to any type of zooid in which the lophophore is replaced by an extension that serves some protective function, while others restrict the term to those that defend the colony by snapping at invaders and small predators, killing some and biting the appendages of others. In some species the snapping zooids are mounted on a peduncle (stalk), their bird-like appearance responsible for the term – Charles Darwin described these as like "the head and beak of a vulture in miniature, seated on a neck and capable of movement". Stalked avicularia are placed upside-down on their stalks. The "lower jaws" are modified versions of the opercula that protect the retracted lophophores in autozooids of some species, and are snapped shut "like a mousetrap" by similar muscles, while the beak-shaped upper jaw is the inverted body wall. In other species the avicularia are stationary box-like zooids laid the normal way up, so that the modified operculum snaps down against the body wall. In both types the modified operculum is opened by other muscles that attach to it, or by internal muscles that raise the fluid pressure by pulling on a flexible membrane. The actions of these snapping zooids are controlled by small, highly modified polypides that are located inside the "mouth" and bear tufts of short sensory cilia. These zooids appear in various positions: some take the place of autozooids, some fit into small gaps between autozooids, and small avicularia may occur on the surfaces of other zooids.

In vibracula, regarded by some as a type of avicularia, the operculum is modified to form a long bristle that has a wide range of motion. They may function as defenses against predators and invaders, or as cleaners. In some species that form mobile colonies, vibracula around the edges are used as legs for burrowing and walking.

==== Structural polymorphs ====
Kenozooids (from the Greek kenós 'empty') consist only of the body wall and funicular strands crossing the interior, and no polypide. The functions of these zooids include forming the stems of branching structures, acting as spacers that enable colonies to grow quickly in a new direction, strengthening the colony's branches, and elevating the colony slightly above its substrate for competitive advantages against other organisms. Some kenozooids are hypothesized to be capable of storing nutrients for the colony. Because kenozooids' function is generally structural, they are called "structural polymorphs."

Some heterozooids found in extinct trepostome bryozoans, called mesozooids, are thought to have functioned to space the feeding autozooids an appropriate distance apart. In thin sections of trepostome fossils, mesozooids can be seen in between the tubes that held autozooids; they are smaller tubes that are divided along their length by diaphragms, making them look like rows of box-like chambers sandwiched between autozooidal tubes.

==== Reproductive polymorphs ====
Gonozooids act as brood chambers for fertilized eggs. Almost all modern cyclostome bryozoans have them, but they can be hard to locate on a colony because there are so few gonozooids in one colony. The aperture in gonozooids, which is called an ooeciopore, acts as a point for larvae to exit. Some gonozooids have very complex shapes with autozooidal tubes passing through chambers within them. All larvae released from a gonozooid are clones created by division of a single egg; this is called monozygotic polyembryony, and is a reproductive strategy also used by armadillos.

Cheilostome bryozoans also brood their embryos; one of the common methods is through ovicells, capsules attached to autozooids. The autozooids possessing ovicells are normally still able to feed, however, so these are not considered heterozooids.

"Female" polymorphs are more common than "male" polymorphs, but specialized zooids that produce sperm are also known. These are called androzooids, and some are found in colonies of Odontoporella bishopi, a species that is symbiotic with hermit crabs and lives on their shells. These zooids are smaller than the others and have four short tentacles and four long tentacles, unlike the autozooids which have 15–16 tentacles. Androzooids are also found in species with mobile colonies that can crawl around. It is possible that androzooids are used to exchange sperm between colonies when two mobile colonies or bryozoan-encrusted hermit crabs happen to encounter one another.

==== Other polymorphs ====
Spinozooids are hollow, movable spines, like very slender, small tubes, present on the surface of colonies, which probably are for defense. Some species have miniature nanozooids with small single-tentacled polypides, and these may grow on other zooids or within the body walls of autozooids that have degenerated.

=== Colony forms and composition ===
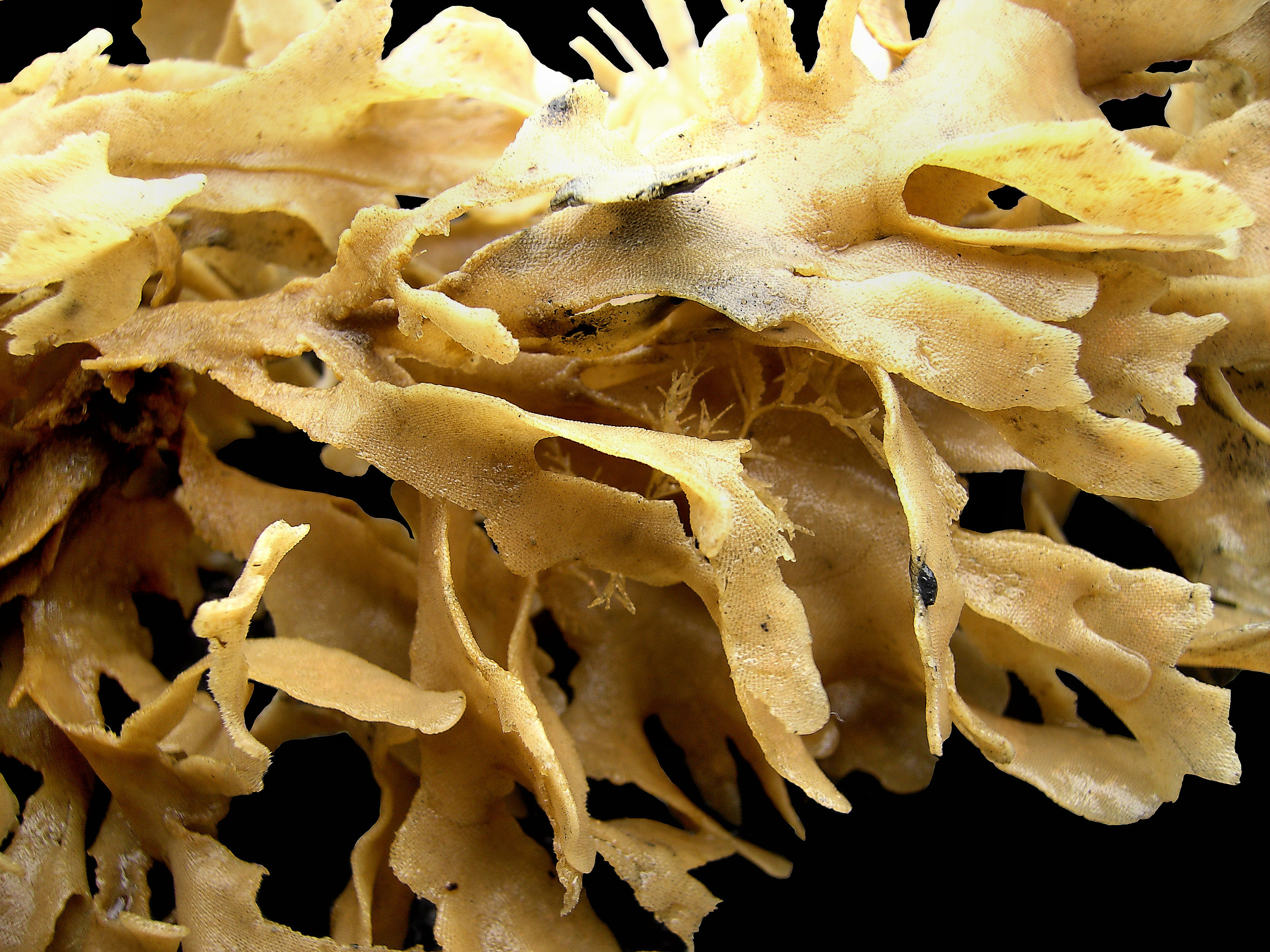
A colony of the modern marine bryozoan Flustra foliacea.

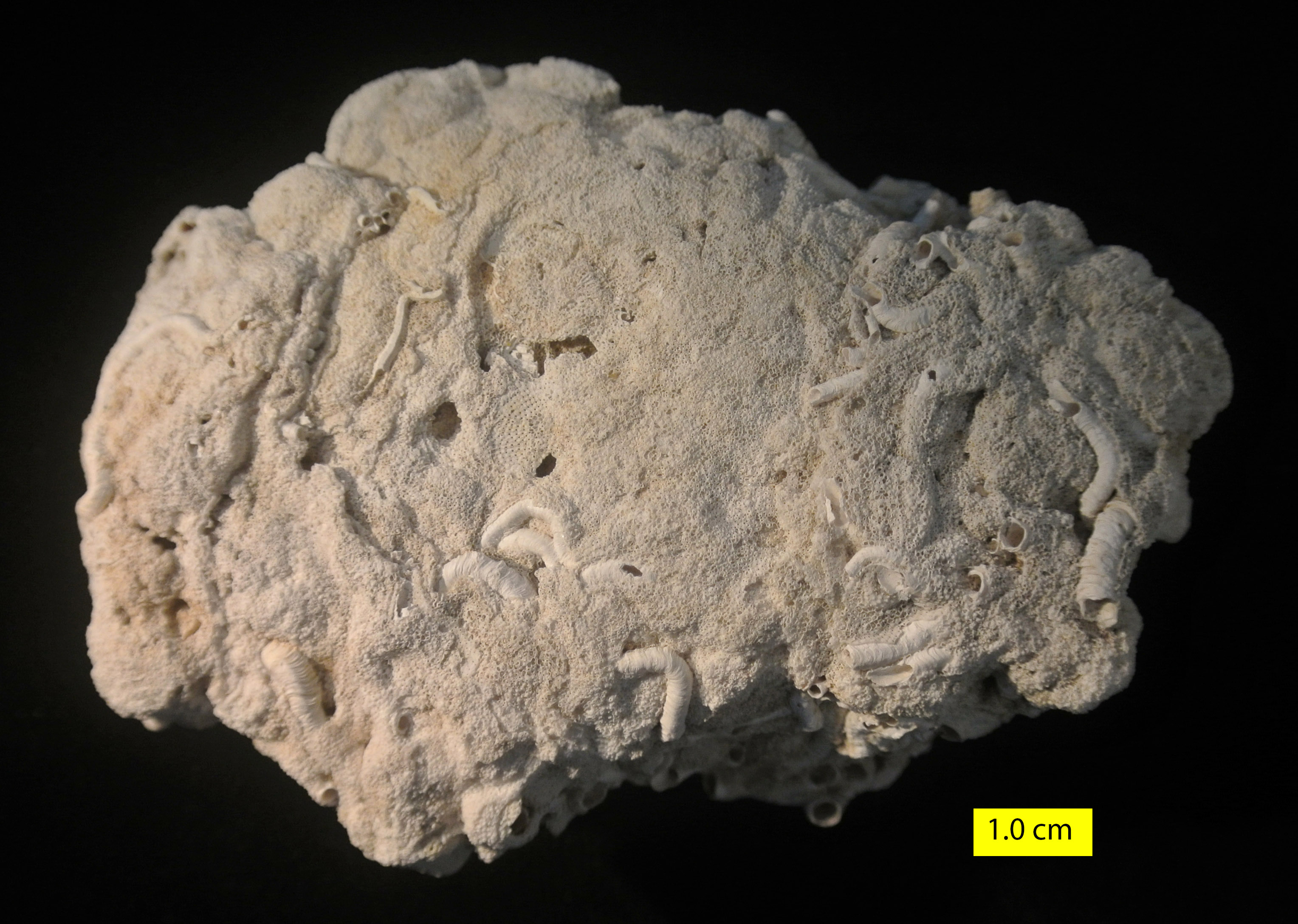
Cheilostome bryozoan with serpulid tubes

Although zooids are microscopic, colonies range in size from 1 cm (1/2 in) to over 1 m (3 ft 3 in). However, the majority are under 10 cm (4 in) across. The shapes of colonies vary widely, depend on the pattern of budding by which they grow, the variety of zooids present and the type and amount of skeletal material they secrete.

Some marine species are bush-like or fan-like, supported by "trunks" and "branches" formed by kenozooids, with feeding autozooids growing from these. Colonies of these types are generally unmineralized but may have exoskeletons made of chitin. Others look like small corals, producing heavy lime skeletons. Many species form colonies which consist of sheets of autozooids. These sheets may form leaves, tufts or, in the genus Thalamoporella, structures that resemble an open head of lettuce.

The most common marine form, however, is encrusting, in which a one-layer sheet of zooids spreads over a hard surface or over seaweed. Some encrusting colonies may grow to over 50 cm (1 ft 8 in) and contain about 2,000,000 zooids. These species generally have exoskeletons reinforced with calcium carbonate, and the openings through which the lophophores protrude are on the top or outer surface. The moss-like appearance of encrusting colonies is responsible for the phylum's name (Ancient Greek words βρύον brúon meaning 'moss' and ζῷον zôion meaning 'animal'). Large colonies of encrusting species often have "chimneys", gaps in the canopy of lophophores, through which they swiftly expel water that has been sieved, and thus avoid re-filtering water that is already exhausted. They are formed by patches of non-feeding heterozooids. New chimneys appear near the edges of expanding colonies, at points where the speed of the outflow is already high, and do not change position if the water flow changes.

Some freshwater species secrete a mass of gelatinous material, up to 1 m (3 ft 3 in) in diameter, to which the zooids stick. Other freshwater species have plant-like shapes with "trunks" and "branches", which may stand erect or spread over the surface. A few species can creep at about 2 cm (3/4 in) per day.

Each colony grows by asexual budding from a single zooid known as the ancestrula, which is round rather than shaped like a normal zooid. This occurs at the tips of "trunks" or "branches" in forms that have this structure. Encrusting colonies grow round their edges. In species with calcareous exoskeletons, these do not mineralize until the zooids are fully grown. Colony lifespans range from one to about 12 years, and the short-lived species pass through several generations in one season.

Species that produce defensive zooids do so only when threats have already appeared, and may do so within 48 hours. The theory of "induced defenses" suggests that production of defenses is expensive and that colonies which defend themselves too early or too heavily will have reduced growth rates and lifespans. This "last minute" approach to defense is feasible because the loss of zooids to a single attack is unlikely to be significant. Colonies of some encrusting species also produce special heterozooids to limit the expansion of other encrusting organisms, especially other bryozoans. In some cases this response is more belligerent if the opposition is smaller, which suggests that zooids on the edge of a colony can somehow sense the size of the opponent. Some species consistently prevail against certain others, but most turf wars are indecisive and the combatants soon turn to growing in uncontested areas. Bryozoans competing for territory do not use the sophisticated techniques employed by sponges or corals, possibly because the shortness of bryozoan lifespans makes heavy investment in turf wars unprofitable.

Bryozoans have contributed to carbonate sedimentation in marine life since the Ordovician period. Bryozoans take responsibility for many of the colony forms, which have evolved in different taxonomic groups and vary in sediment producing ability. The nine basic bryozoan colony-forms include: encrusting, dome-shaped, palmate, foliose, fenestrate, robust branching, delicate branching, articulated and free-living. Most of these sediments come from two distinct groups of colonies: domal, delicate branching, robust branching and palmate; and fenestrate. Fenestrate colonies generate rough particles both as sediment and components of stromatoporoids coral reefs. The delicate colonies however, create both coarse sediment and form the cores of deep-water, subphotic biogenic mounds. Nearly all post- bryozoan sediments are made up of growth forms, with the addition to free-living colonies which include significant numbers of various colonies. "In contrast to the Palaeozoic, post-Palaeozoic bryozoans generated sediment varying more widely with the size of their grains; they grow as they moved from mud, to sand, to gravel."

== Taxonomy ==
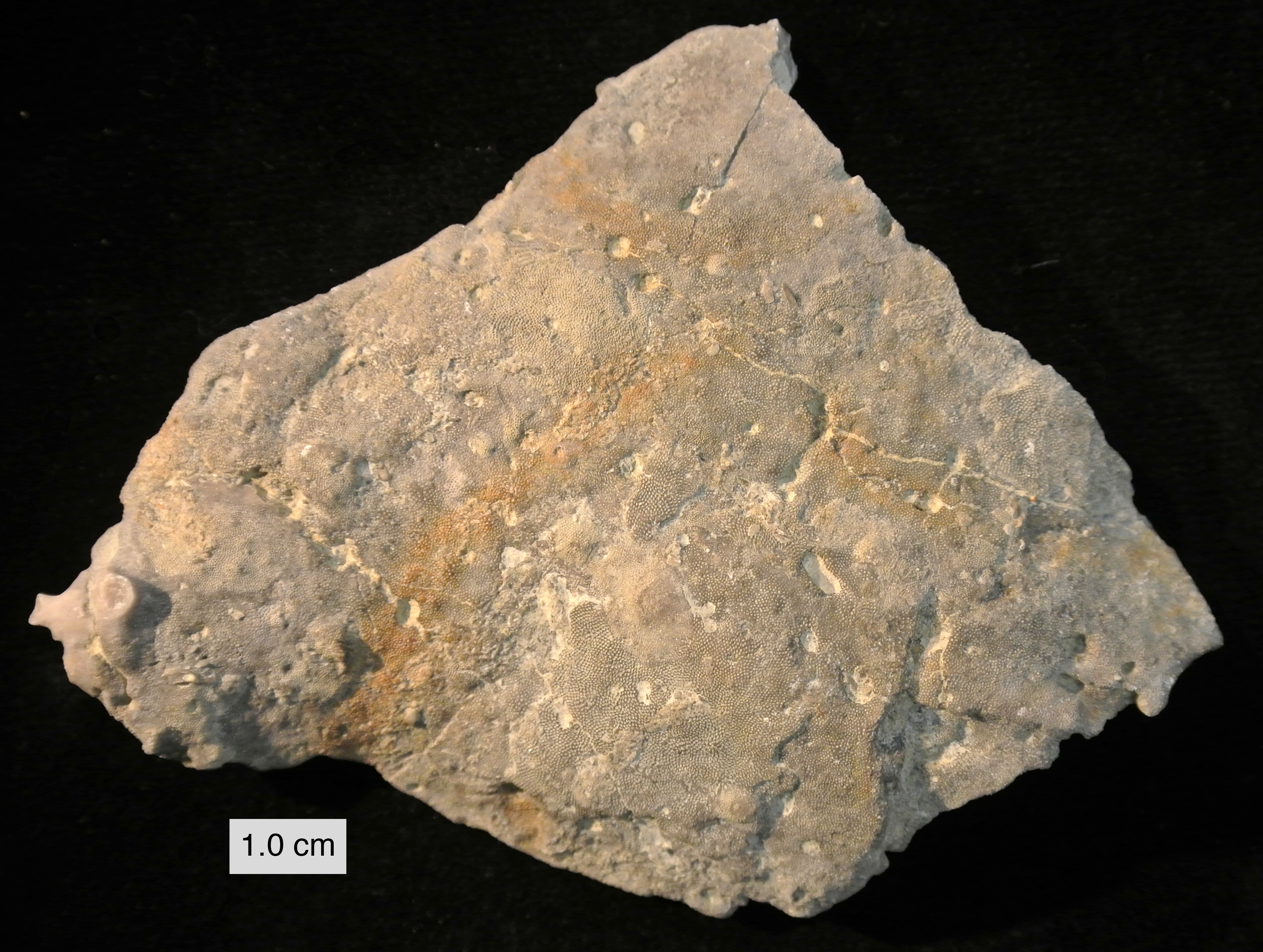
Peronopora, a trepostome bryozoan from the Whitewater Formation (Upper Ordovician) of eastern Indiana, United States

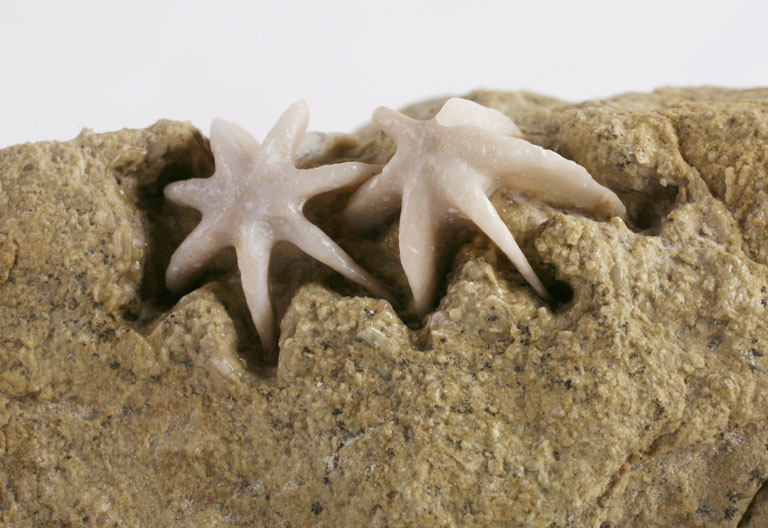
Evactinopora bryozoan found in Jefferson County, Missouri, United States

The phylum was originally called "Polyzoa", but this name was eventually replaced by Ehrenberg's term "Bryozoa". The name "Bryozoa" was originally applied only to the animals also known as Ectoprocta (lit. 'outside-anus'), in which the anus lies outside the "crown" of tentacles. After the discovery of the Entoprocta (lit. 'inside-anus'), in which the anus lies within a "crown" of tentacles, the name "Bryozoa" was promoted to phylum level to include the two classes Ectoprocta and Entoprocta. However, in 1869 Hinrich Nitsche regarded the two groups as quite distinct for a variety of reasons, and coined the name "Ectoprocta" for Ehrenberg's "Bryozoa". Despite their apparently similar methods of feeding, they differed markedly anatomically; in addition to the different positions of the anus, ectoprocts have hollow tentacles and a coelom, while entoprocts have solid tentacles and no coelom. Hence the two groups are now widely regarded as separate phyla, and the name "Bryozoa" is now synonymous with "Ectoprocta". This has remained the majority view ever since, although most publications have preferred the name "Bryozoa" rather than "Ectoprocta". Nevertheless, some notable scientists have continued to regard the "Ectoprocta" and Entoprocta as close relatives and group them under "Bryozoa".

The ambiguity about the scope of the name "Bryozoa" led to proposals in the 1960s and 1970s that it should be avoided and the unambiguous term "Ectoprocta" should be used. However, the change would have made it harder to find older works in which the phylum was called "Bryozoa", and the desire to avoid ambiguity, if applied consistently to all classifications, would have necessitated renaming of several other phyla and many lower-level groups. In practice, zoological naming of split or merged groups of animals is complex and not completely consistent. Works since 2000 have used various names to resolve the ambiguity, including: "Bryozoa", "Ectoprocta", "Bryozoa (Ectoprocta)", and "Ectoprocta (Bryozoa)". Some have used more than one approach in the same work.

The common name "moss animals" is the literal meaning of "Bryozoa", from Greek βρυόν ('moss') and ζῷα ('animals'), based on the mossy appearance of encrusting species.

Until 2008 there were "inadequately known and misunderstood type species belonging to the cyclostome bryozoan family Oncousoeciidae." Modern research and experiments have been done using low-vacuum scanning electron microscopy of uncoated type material to critically examine and perhaps revise the taxonomy of three genera belonging to this family, including Oncousoecia, Microeciella, and Eurystrotos. This method permits data to be obtained that would be difficult to recognize with an optical microscope. The valid type species of Oncousoecia was found to be Oncousoecia lobulata. This interpretation stabilizes Oncousoecia by establishing a type species that corresponds to the general usage of the genus. Fellow Oncousoeciid Eurystrotos is now believed to be not conspecific with O. lobulata, as previously suggested, but shows enough similarities to be considered a junior synonym of Oncousoecia. Microeciella suborbicularus has also been recently distinguished from O. lobulata and O. dilatans, using this modern method of low vacuum scanning, with which it has been inaccurately synonymized with in the past. A new genus has also been recently discovered called Junerossia in the family Stomachetosellidae, along with 10 relatively new species of Bryozoa such as Alderina flaventa, Corbulella extenuata, Puellina septemcryptica, Junerossia copiosa, Calyptotheca kapaaensis, Bryopesanser serratus, Cribellopora souleorum, Metacleidochasma verrucosa, Disporella compta, and Favosipora adunca.

=== Classification and diversity ===
Counts of formally described species range between 4,000 and 4,500. The Gymnolaemata and especially Cheilostomata have the greatest numbers of species, possibly because of their wide range of specialist zooids. Under the Linnaean system of classification, which is still used as a convenient way to label groups of organisms, living members of the phylum Bryozoa are divided into:

Class	Phylactolaemata	Stenolaemata	Gymnolaemata	
Order	Plumatellida	Cyclostomatida	Ctenostomatida	Cheilostomata
Environments	Freshwater	Marine	Mostly marine	
Lip-like epistome overhanging mouth	Yes	none		
Colony shapes	Gelatinous masses or tubular branching structures	Erect or encrusting		Erect, encrusting or free-living
Exoskeleton material	Gelatinous or membranous; unmineralized	Mineralized	Chitin, gelatinous or membranous; unmineralized	Mineralized
Operculum ("lid")	none	none (except in family Eleidae)	None in most species	Yes (except in genus Bugula)
Shape of lophophore	U-shaped appearance (except in genus Fredericella, whose lophophore is circular)	Circular		
How lophophore extended	Compressing the whole body wall	Compressing the membranous sac (separate inner layer of epithelium that lines the coelom)	Compressing the whole body wall	Pulling inwards of a flexible section of body wall, or making an internal sac expand.
Types of zooid	Autozooids only	Limited heterozooids, mainly gonozooids	Stolons and spines as well as autozooids	Full range of types

=== Fossil record ===
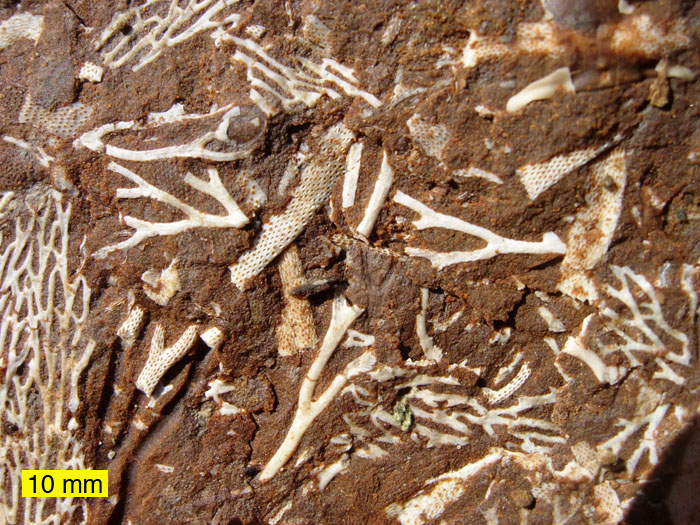
Bryozoan fossils in an Upper Ordovician oil shale (kukersite), northern Estonia.

Stereo image
Left frame
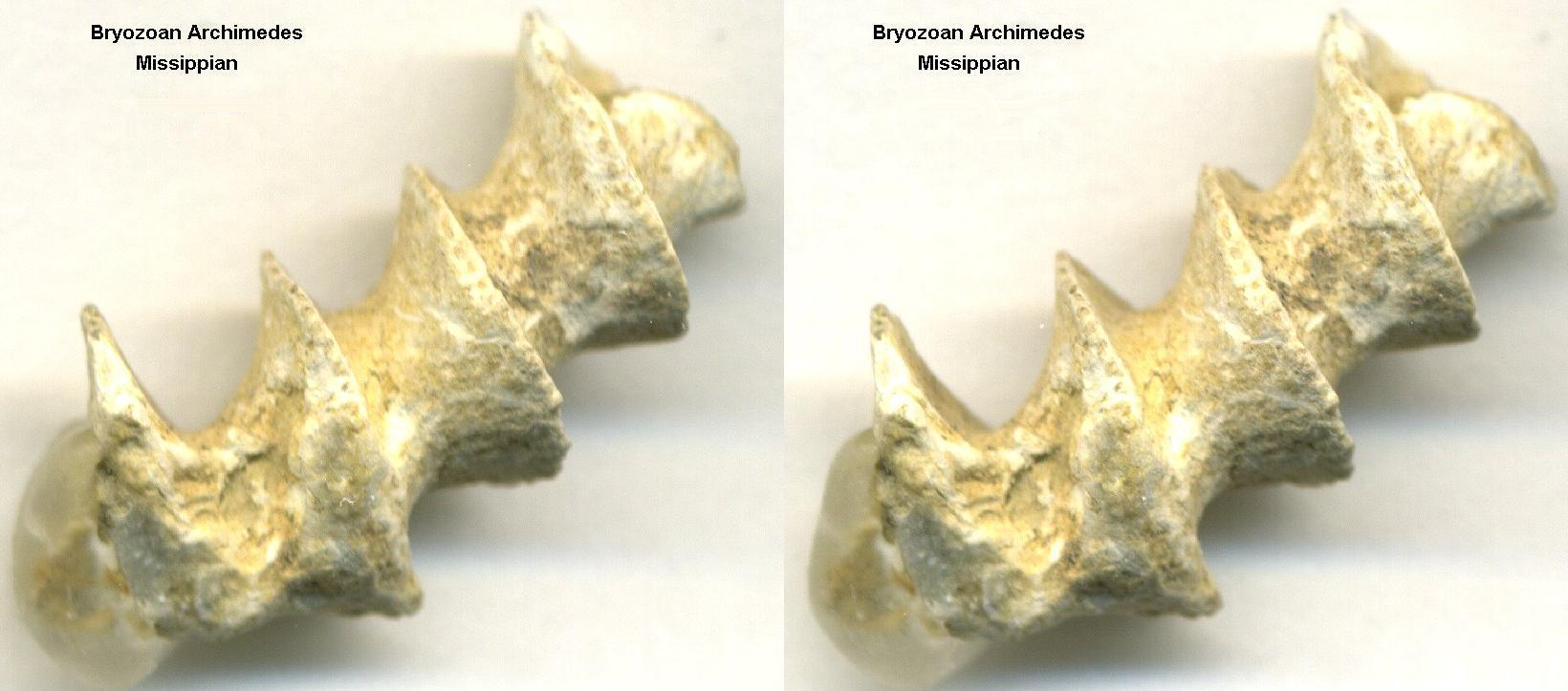
Right frame
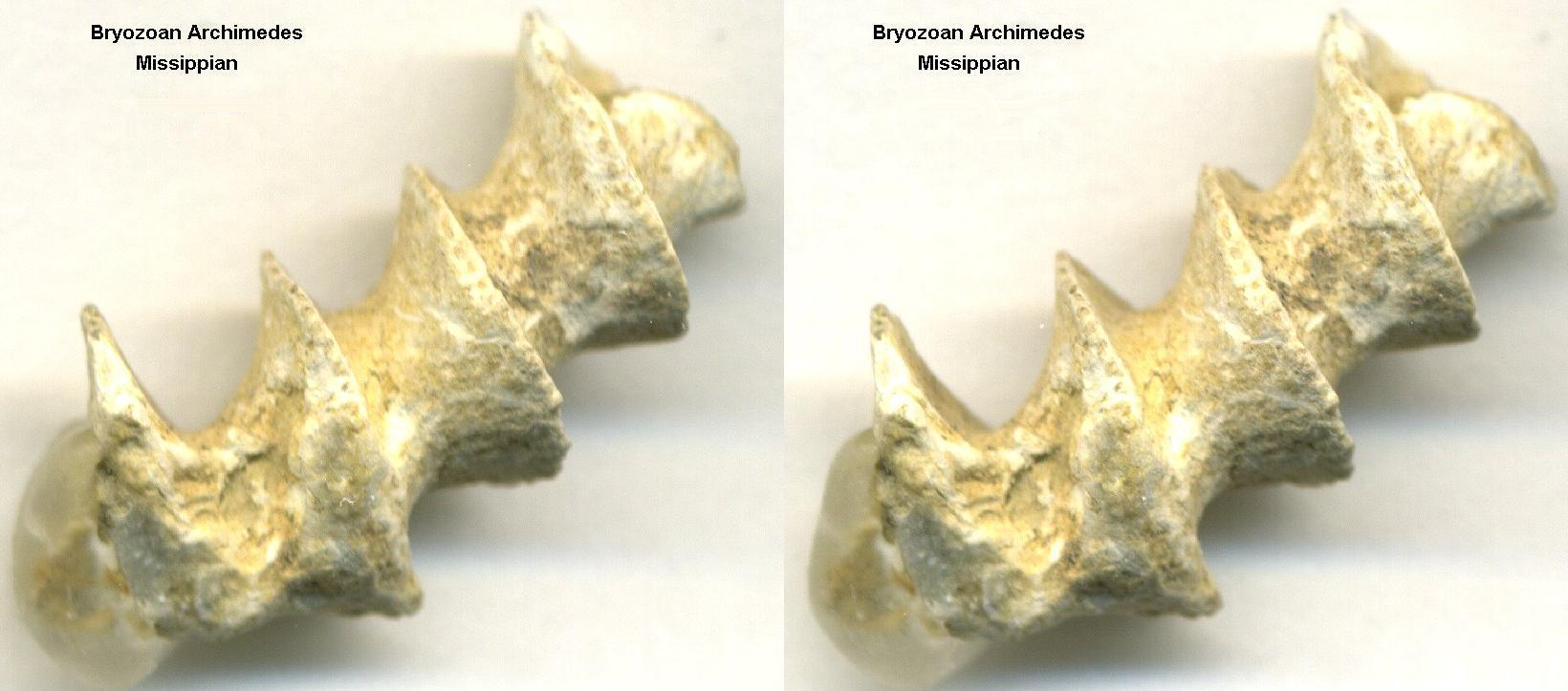
Parallel view
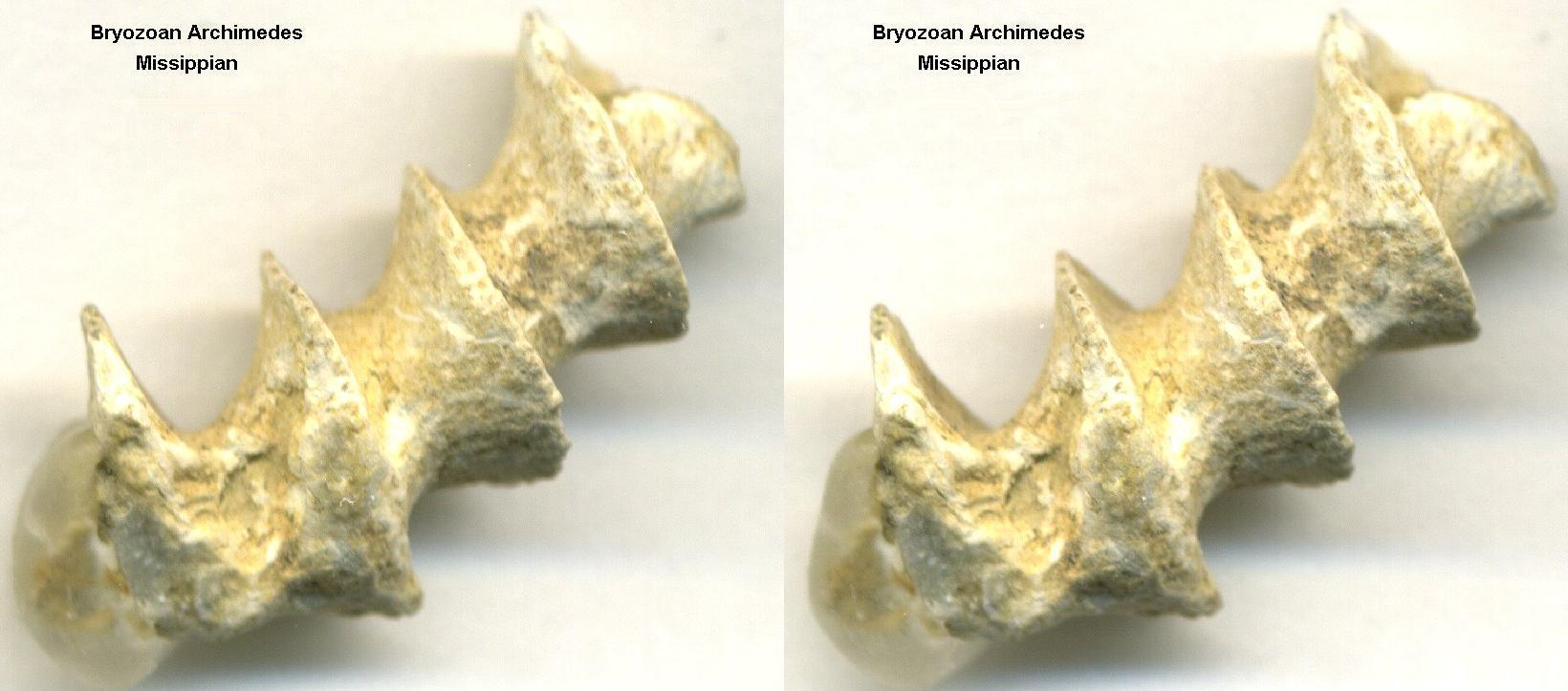
Cross-eye view
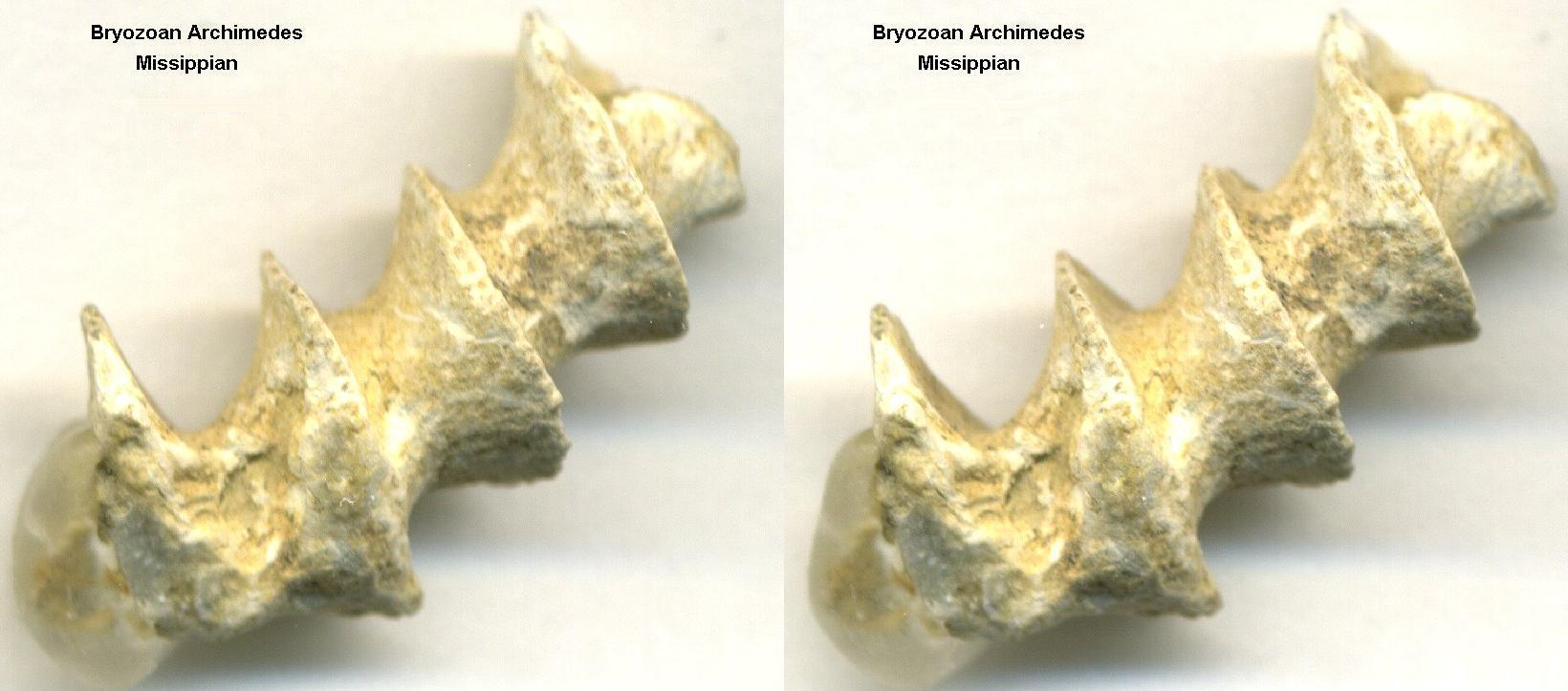

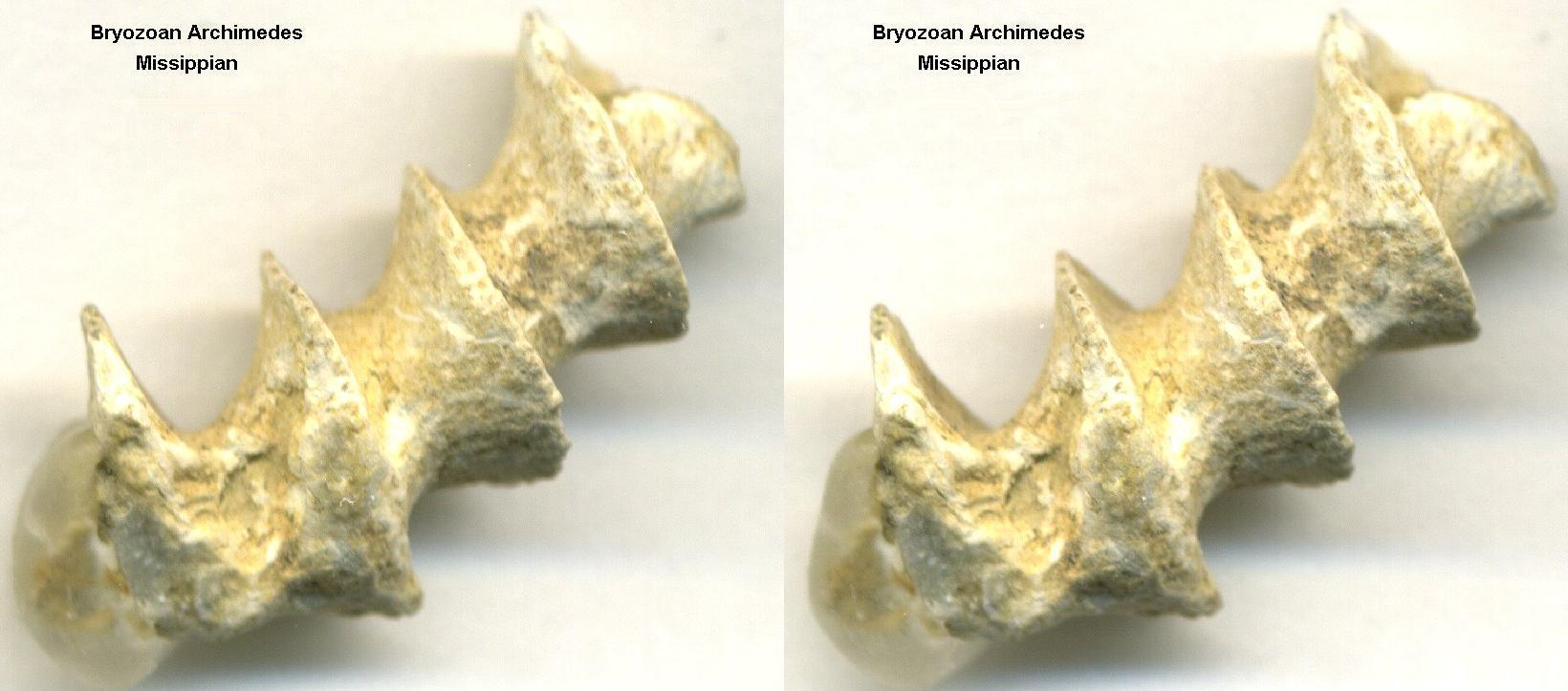
- Fossilized skeleton of Archimedes

Fossils of about 15,000 bryozoan species have been found. Bryozoans are among the three dominant groups of Paleozoic fossils. Bryozoans with calcitic skeletons were a major source of the carbonate minerals that make up limestones, and their fossils are incredibly common in marine sediments worldwide from the Ordovician onward. However, unlike corals and other colonial animals found in the fossil record, bryozoan colonies did not reach large sizes. Fossil bryozoan colonies are typically found highly fragmented and scattered; the preservation of complete zoaria is uncommon in the fossil record, and relatively little study has been devoted to reassembling fragmented zoaria. The largest known fossil colonies are branching trepostome bryozoans from Ordovician rocks in the United States, reaching 66 centimeters in height.

The oldest known bryozoans with mineralized skeleton are represented by Protomelission and Dayingomelission, with their phosphatized soft tissues in modular skeletons reported from the Xiannüdong Formation (Cambrian Stage 3) of southern Shaanxi, China. By the Arenigian stage of the early Ordovician period, about 480 million years ago, all the modern orders of stenolaemates were present, and the ctenostome order of gymnolaemates had appeared by the Middle Ordovician, about 465 million years ago. The Early Ordovician fossils may also represent forms that had already become significantly different from the original members of the phylum. Ctenostomes with phosphatized soft tissue are known from the Devonian. Other types of filter feeders appeared around the same time, which suggests that some change made the environment more favorable for this lifestyle. Fossils of cheilostomates, an order of gymnolaemates with mineralized skeletons, first appear in the Mid Jurassic, about 172 million years ago, and these have been the most abundant and diverse bryozoans from the Cretaceous to the present. Evidence compiled from the last 100 million years show that cheilostomatids consistently grew over cyclostomatids in territorial struggles, which may help to explain how cheilostomatids replaced cyclostomatids as the dominant marine bryozoans. Marine fossils from the Paleozoic era, which ended 251 million years ago, are mainly of erect forms, those from the Mesozoic are fairly equally divided by erect and encrusting forms, and more recent ones are predominantly encrusting. Fossils of the soft, freshwater phylactolaemates are very rare, appear in and after the Late Permian (which began about 260 million years ago) and consist entirely of their durable statoblasts. There are no known fossils of freshwater members of other classes.

=== Evolutionary family tree ===
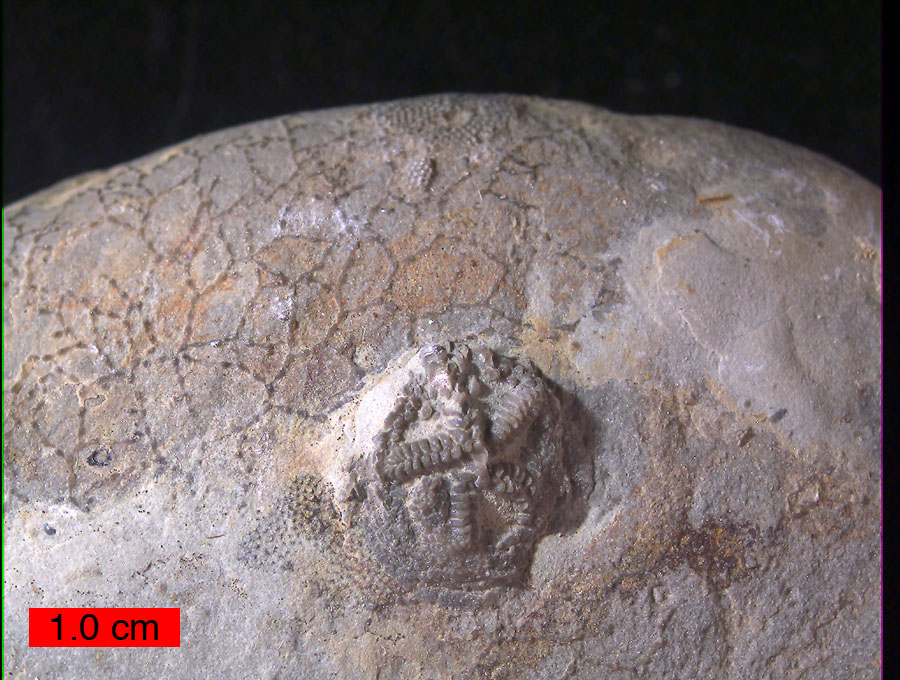
An Upper Ordovician cobble with the edrioasteroid Cystaster stellatus and the thin branching cyclostome bryozoan Corynotrypa. Kope Formation, northern Kentucky, United States.

Scientists are divided about whether the Bryozoa (Ectoprocta) are a monophyletic group (whether they include all and only a single ancestor species and all its descendants), about what are the phylum's closest relatives in the family tree of animals, and even about whether they should be regarded as members of the protostomes or deuterostomes, the two major groups that account for all moderately complex animals.

Molecular phylogeny, which attempts to work out the evolutionary family tree of organisms by comparing their biochemistry and especially their genes, has done much to clarify the relationships between the better-known invertebrate phyla. However, the shortage of genetic data about "minor phyla" such as bryozoans and entoprocts has left their relationships to other groups unclear.

==== Traditional view ====
The traditional view is that the Bryozoa are a monophyletic group, in which the class Phylactolaemata is most closely related to Stenolaemata and Ctenostomatida, the classes that appear earliest in the fossil record. However, in 2005 a molecular phylogeny study that focused on phylactolaemates concluded that these are more closely related to the phylum Phoronida, and especially to the only phoronid species that is colonial, than they are to the other ectoproct classes. That implies that the Entoprocta are not monophyletic, as the Phoronida are a sub-group of ectoprocts but the standard definition of Entoprocta excludes the Phoronida.

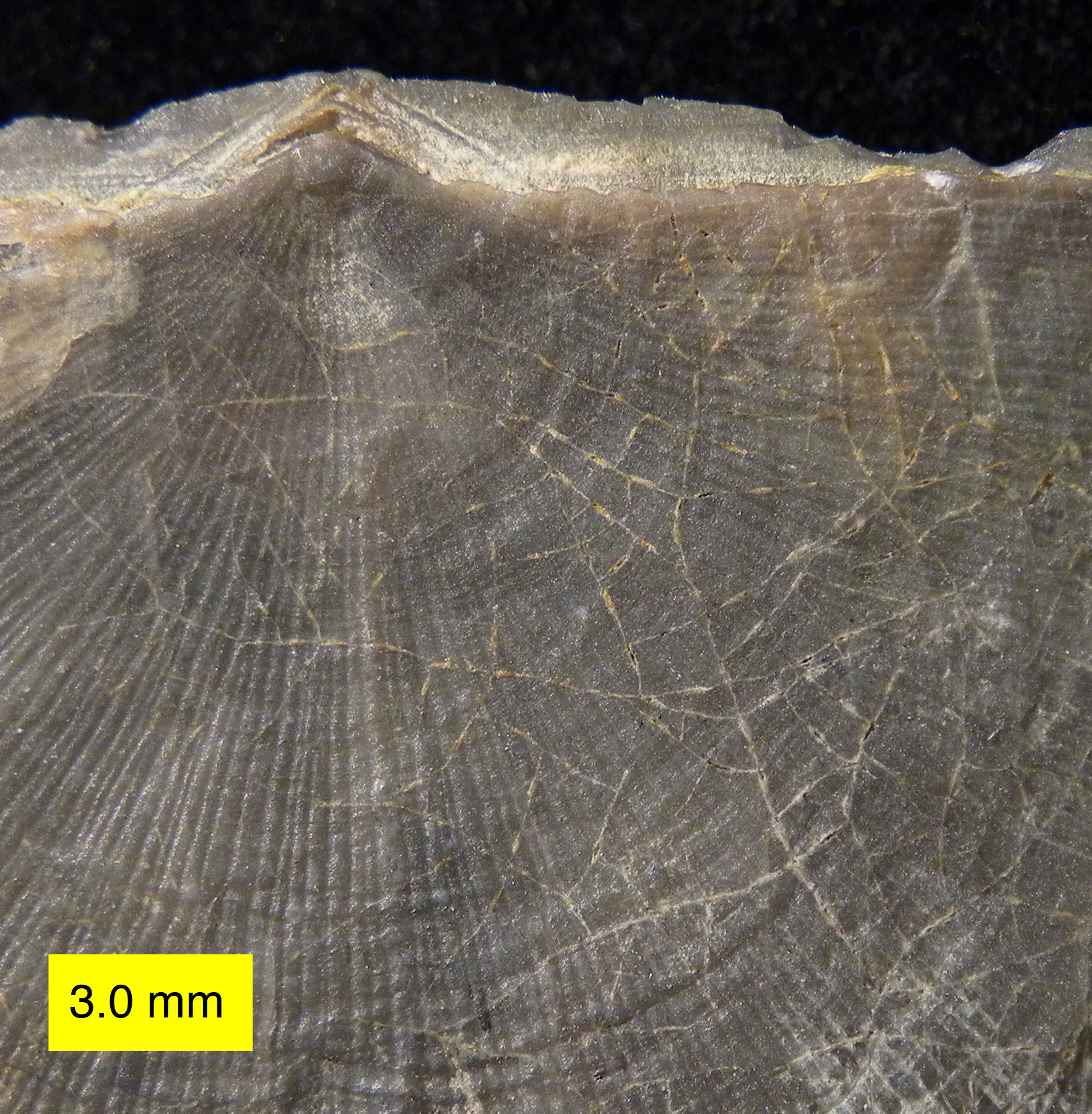
Ropalonaria venosa, an etching trace fossil of a Late Ordovician ctenostome bryozoan on a strophomenid brachiopod valve; Cincinnatian of southeastern Indiana, United States.

In 2009 another molecular phylogeny study, using a combination of genes from mitochondria and the cell nucleus, concluded that Bryozoa is a monophyletic phylum, in other words includes all the descendants of a common ancestor that is itself a bryozoan. The analysis also concluded that the classes Phylactolaemata, Stenolaemata and Gymnolaemata are also monophyletic, but could not determine whether Stenolaemata are more closely related to Phylactolaemata or Gymnolaemata. The Gymnolaemata are traditionally divided into the soft-bodied Ctenostomatida and mineralized Cheilostomata, but the 2009 analysis considered it more likely that neither of these orders is monophyletic and that mineralized skeletons probably evolved more than once within the early Gymnolaemata.

Bryozoans' relationships with other phyla are uncertain and controversial. Traditional phylogeny, based on anatomy and on the development of the adult forms from embryos, has produced no enduring consensus about the position of ectoprocts. Attempts to reconstruct the family tree of animals have largely ignored ectoprocts and other "minor phyla", which have received little scientific study because they are generally tiny, have relatively simple body plans, and have little impact on human economies – despite the fact that the "minor phyla" include most of the variety in the evolutionary history of animals.

In the opinion of Ruth Dewel, Judith Winston, and Frank McKinney, "Our standard interpretation of bryozoan morphology and embryology is a construct resulting from over 100 years of attempts to synthesize a single framework for all invertebrates," and takes little account of some peculiar features of ectoprocts.

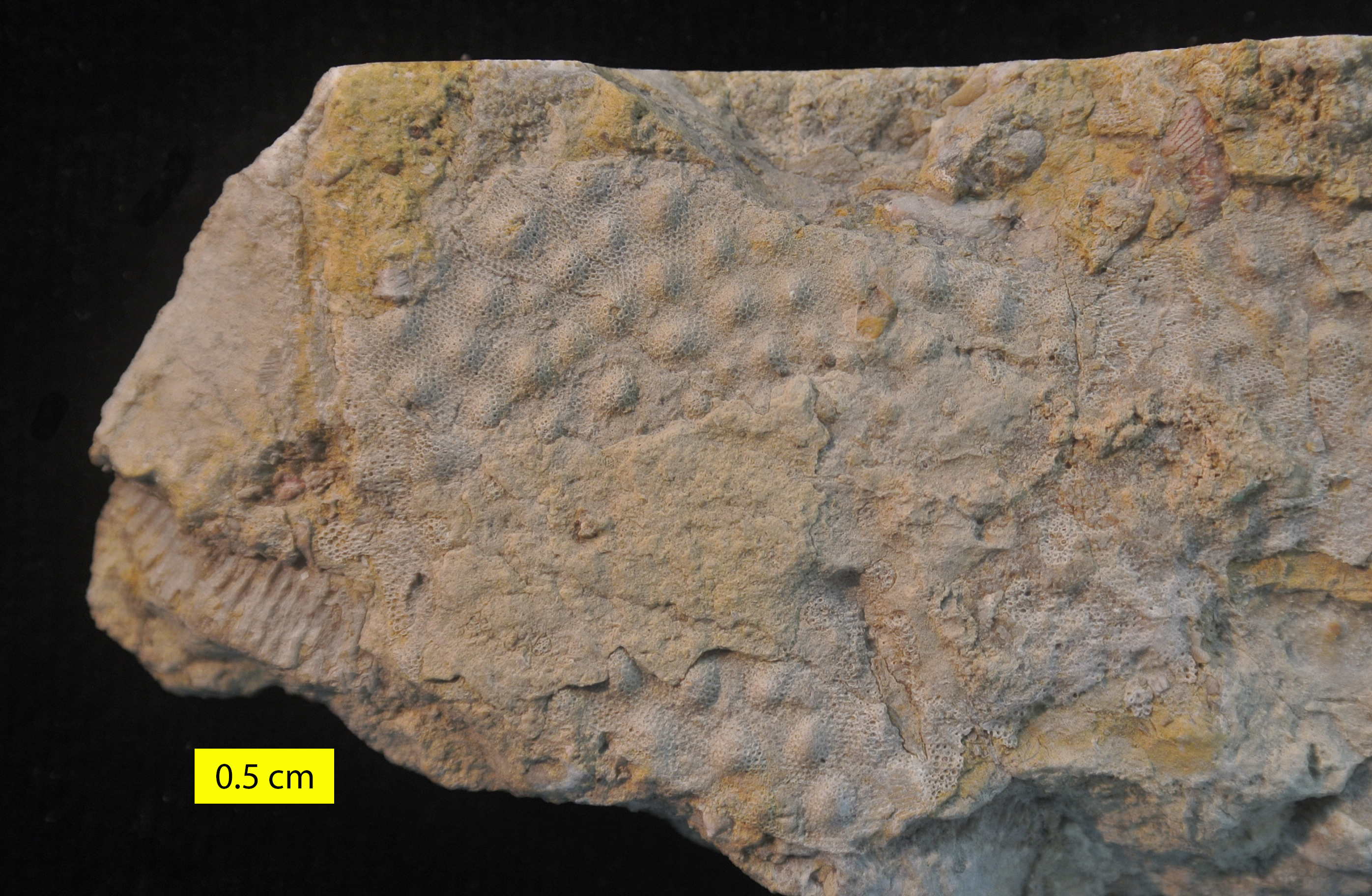
Phaenopora superba, a ptilodictyine bryozoan from the Silurian of Ohio, United States

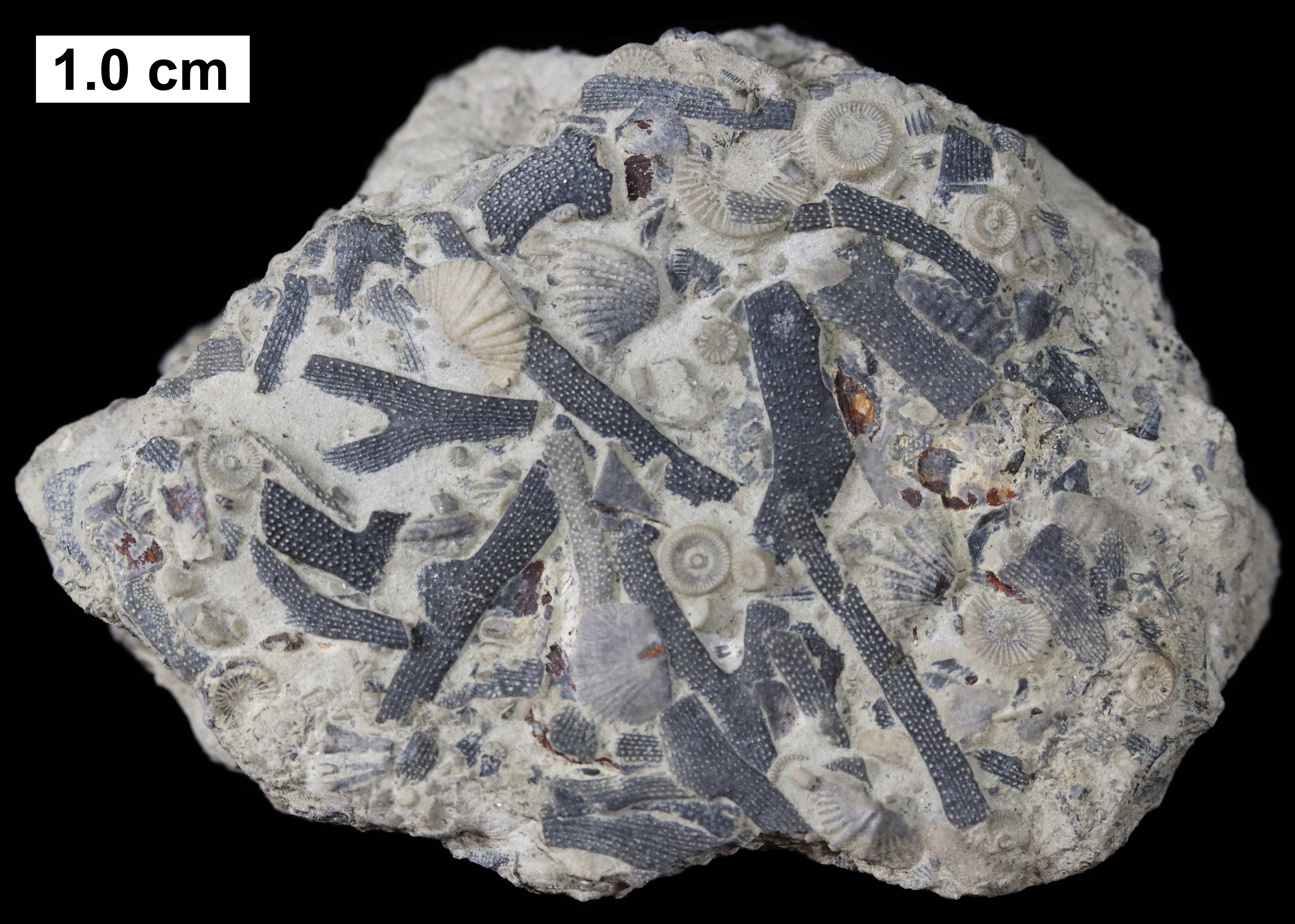
The flat, branching bryozoan Sulcoretepora, from the Middle Devonian of Wisconsin, United States

In ectoprocts, all of the larva's internal organs are destroyed during the metamorphosis to the adult form and the adult's organs are built from the larva's epidermis and mesoderm, while in other bilaterians some organs including the gut are built from endoderm. In most bilaterian embryos the blastopore, a dent in the outer wall, deepens to become the larva's gut, but in ectoprocts the blastopore disappears and a new dent becomes the point from which the gut grows. The ectoproct coelom is formed by neither of the processes used by other bilaterians, enterocoely, in which pouches that form on the wall of the gut become separate cavities, nor schizocoely, in which the tissue between the gut and the body wall splits, forming paired cavities.

==== Entoprocts ====
When entoprocts were discovered in the 19th century, they and bryozoans (ectoprocts) were regarded as classes within the phylum Bryozoa, because both groups were sessile animals that filter-fed by means of a crown of tentacles that bore cilia.

From 1869 onwards increasing awareness of differences, including the position of the entoproct anus inside the feeding structure and the difference in the early pattern of division of cells in their embryos, caused scientists to regard the two groups as separate phyla, and "Bryozoa" became just an alternative name for ectoprocts, in which the anus is outside the feeding organ. A series of molecular phylogeny studies from 1996 to 2006 have also concluded that bryozoans (ectoprocts) and entoprocts are not sister groups.

However, two well-known zoologists, Claus Nielsen and Thomas Cavalier-Smith, maintain on anatomical and developmental grounds that bryozoans and entoprocts are member of the same phylum, Bryozoa. A molecular phylogeny study in 2007 also supported this old idea, while its conclusions about other phyla agreed with those of several other analyses.

==== Grouping into the Lophophorata ====
By 1891 bryozoans (ectoprocts) were grouped with phoronids in a super-phylum called "Tentaculata". In the 1970s comparisons between phoronid larvae and the cyphonautes larva of some gymnolaete bryozoans produced suggestions that the bryozoans, most of which are colonial, evolved from a semi-colonial species of phoronid. Brachiopods were also assigned to the "Tentaculata", which were renamed Lophophorata as they all use a lophophore for filter feeding.

The majority of scientists accept this, but Claus Nielsen thinks these similarities are superficial. The Lophophorata are usually defined as animals with a lophophore, a three-part coelom and a U-shaped gut. In Nielsen's opinion, phoronids' and brachiopods' lophophores are more like those of pterobranchs, which are members of the phylum Hemichordata. Bryozoan's tentacles bear cells with multiple cilia, while the corresponding cells of phoronids', brachiopods' and pterobranchs' lophophores have one cilium per cell; and bryozoan tentacles have no hemal canal ("blood vessel"), which those of the other three phyla have.

If the grouping of bryozoans with phoronids and brachiopods into Lophophorata is correct, the next issue is whether the Lophophorata are protostomes, along with most invertebrate phyla, or deuterostomes, along with chordates, hemichordates and echinoderms.

The traditional view was that lophophorates were a mix of protostome and deuterostome features. Research from the 1970s onwards suggested they were deuterostomes, because of some features that were thought characteristic of deuterostomes: a three-part coelom; radial rather than spiral cleavage in the development of the embryo; and formation of the coelom by enterocoely. However the coelom of ectoproct larvae shows no sign of division into three sections, and that of adult ectoprocts is different from that of other coelomate phyla as it is built anew from epidermis and mesoderm after metamorphosis has destroyed the larval coelom.

==== Lophophorate molecular phylogenetics ====
Molecular phylogeny analyses from 1995 onwards, using a variety of biochemical evidence and analytical techniques, placed the lophophorates as protostomes and closely related to annelids and molluscs in a super-phylum called Lophotrochozoa. "Total evidence" analyses, which used both morphological features and a relatively small set of genes, came to various conclusions, mostly favoring a close relationship between lophophorates and Lophotrochozoa. A study in 2008, using a larger set of genes, concluded that the lophophorates were closer to the Lophotrochozoa than to deuterostomes, but also that the lophophorates were not monophyletic. Instead, it concluded that brachiopods and phoronids formed a monophyletic group, but bryozoans (ectoprocts) were closest to entoprocts, supporting the original definition of "Bryozoa".

They are the only major phylum of exclusively clonal animals, composed of modular units known as zooids. Because they thrive in colonies, colonial growth allows them to develop unrestricted variations in form. Despite this, only a small number of basic growth forms have been found and have commonly reappeared throughout the history of the Bryozoa.

- Lophotrochozoa
  - Cycliophora
  - Annelida
  - - Mollusca
    - - Lophophorata
        - Brachiozoa
          - Brachiopoda
          - Phoronida
        - Bryozoa s.l.
          - Entoprocta
          - Ectoprocta

==== Ectoproct molecular phylogenetics ====
The phylogenetic position of the ectoproct bryozoans remains uncertain, but it remains certain that they belong to the Protostomia and more specifically to the Lophotrochozoa. This implies that the ectoproct larva is a trochophore with the corona being a homologue of the prototroch; this is supported from the similarity between the coronate larvae and the Type 1 pericalymma larvae of some molluscs and sipunculans, where the prototroch zone is expanded to cover the hyposphere.

A study of the mitochondrial DNA sequence suggests that the Bryozoa may be related to the Chaetognatha.

== Physiology ==
=== Feeding and excretion ===
Most species are filter feeders that sieve small particles, mainly phytoplankton (microscopic floating plants), out of the water. The freshwater species Plumatella emarginata feeds on diatoms, green algae, cyanobacteria, non-photosynthetic bacteria, dinoflagellates, rotifers, protozoa, small nematodes, and microscopic crustaceans. While the currents that bryozoans generate to draw food towards the mouth are well understood, the exact method of capture is still debated. All species also flick larger particles towards the mouth with a tentacle, and a few capture zooplankton (planktonic animals) by using their tentacles as cages. In addition the tentacles, whose surface area is increased by microvilli (small hairs and pleats), absorb organic compounds dissolved in the water. Unwanted particles may be flicked away by tentacles or shut out by closing the mouth. A study in 2008 showed that both encrusting and erect colonies fed more quickly and grew faster in gentle than in strong currents.

In some species the first part of the stomach forms a muscular gizzard lined with chitinous teeth that crush armored prey such as diatoms. Wave-like peristaltic contractions move the food through the stomach for digestion. The final section of the stomach is lined with cilia (minute hairs) that compress undigested solids, which then pass through the intestine and out through the anus.

There are no nephridia ("little kidneys") or other excretory organs in bryozoa, and it is thought that ammonia diffuses out through the body wall and lophophore. More complex waste products are not excreted but accumulate in the polypide, which degenerates after a few weeks. Some of the old polypide is recycled, but much of it remains as a large mass of dying cells containing accumulated wastes, and this is compressed into a "brown body". When the degeneration is complete, the cystid (outer part of the animal) produces a new polypide, and the brown body remains in the coelom, or in the stomach of the new polypide and is expelled next time the animal defecates.

=== Respiration and circulation ===
There are no respiratory organs, heart or blood vessels. Instead, zooids absorb oxygen and eliminate carbon dioxide through diffusion. Bryozoa accomplish diffusion through the use of either a thin membrane (in the case of anascans and some polyzoa) or through pseudopores located on the outer dermis of the zooid. The different bryozoan groups use various methods to share nutrients and oxygen between zooids: some have quite large gaps in the body walls, allowing the coelomic fluid to circulate freely; in others, the funiculi (internal "little ropes") of adjacent zooids connect via small pores in the body wall.

=== Reproduction and life cycles ===
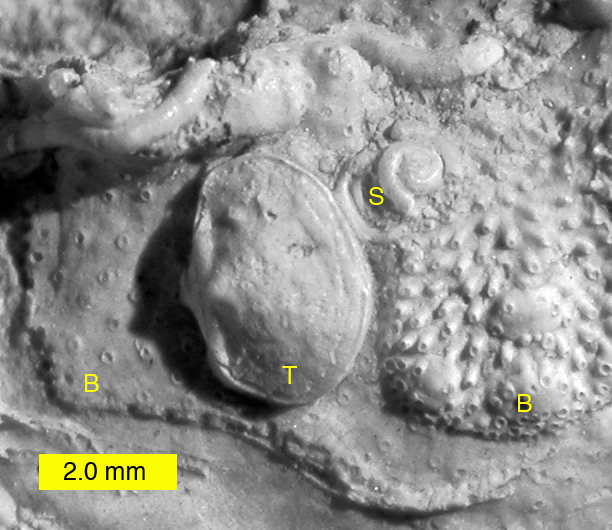
Encrusting cyclostome bryozoans (B), the one on the right showing swollen gonozooids; T = thecideide brachiopod and S = sabellid worm tube; Jurassic of Poland.

Zooids of all phylactolaemate species are simultaneous hermaphrodites. Although those of many marine species are protandric, in other words function first as males and then as females, their colonies contain a combination of zooids that are in their male and female stages. In all species the ovaries develop on the inside of the body wall, and the testes on the funiculus connecting the stomach to the body wall. Eggs and sperm are released into the coelom, and sperm exit into the water through pores in the tips of some of the tentacles, and then are captured by the feeding currents of zooids that are producing eggs. Some species' eggs are fertilized externally after being released through a pore between two tentacles, which in some cases is at the tip of a small projection called the "intertentacular organ" in the base of a pair of tentacles. Others' are fertilized internally, in the intertentacular organ or in the coelom.

All phylactolaemates and stenolaemates, and most gymnolaemates, exhibit placentation, and has therefore lecithotrophic (non-feeding) larvae. Except for Cyclostomata and the small gymnolaemate family Epistomiidae, which are viviparous, all are brooders. Phylactolaemata brood their embryos in an internal brood sac, but Gymnolaemata both external membranous sacs, skeletal chambers (ovicells) and internal brooding sacs exist. The developing embryo relies on egg's yolk, extraembryonic nutrition (matrotrophy) or both.

In ctenostomes the mother provides a brood chamber for the fertilized eggs, and her polypide disintegrates, providing nourishment to the embryo. Stenolaemates produce specialized zooids to serve as brood chambers, and their eggs divide within this to produce up to 100 identical embryos.

Planktotrophic larvae are only found in class Gymnolaemata: In the cheilostomatan suborder Malacostegina they are found in the two families Membraniporidae and Electridae, and in the three ctenostome families Alcyonidiidae, Farrellidae, and Hislopiidae. In addition there are a few unconfirmed records, like the solitary aethozoids, where larvae have never been observed, but which are assumed to have planktotrophic larvae.

The cleavage of bryozoan eggs is biradial, in other words the early stages are bilaterally symmetrical. It is unknown how the coelom forms, since the metamorphosis from larva to adult destroys all of the larva's internal tissues. In many animals the blastopore, an opening in the surface of the early embryo, tunnels through to form the gut. However, in bryozoans the blastopore closes, and a new opening develops to create the mouth.

Bryozoan larvae vary in form, but all have a band of cilia round the body which enables them to swim, a tuft of cilia at the top, and an adhesive sac that everts and anchors them when they settle on a surface. Some gymnolaemate species produce cyphonautes larvae which have little yolk but a well-developed mouth and gut, and live as plankton for a considerable time before settling. These larvae have triangular shells of chitin, with one corner at the top and the base open, forming a hood round the downward-facing mouth. In 2006 it was reported that the cilia of cyphonautes larvae use the same range of techniques as those of adults to capture food. Species that brood their embryos form larvae that are nourished by large yolks, have no gut and do not feed, and such larvae quickly settle on a surface. In all marine species the larvae produce cocoons in which they metamorphose completely after settling: the larva's epidermis becomes the lining of the coelom, and the internal tissues are converted to a food reserve that nourishes the developing zooid until it is ready to feed. The larvae of phylactolaemates produce multiple polypides, so that each new colony starts with several zooids. In all species the founder zooids then grow the new colonies by budding clones of themselves. In phylactolaemates, zooids die after producing several clones, so that living zooids are found only round the edges of a colony.

Phylactolaemates can also reproduce asexually by a method that enables a colony's lineage to survive the variable and uncertain conditions of freshwater environments. Throughout summer and autumn they produce disc-shaped statoblasts, masses of cells that function as "survival pods" rather like the gemmules of sponges. Statoblasts form on the funiculus connected to the parent's gut, which nourishes them. As they grow, statoblasts develop protective bivalve-like shells made of chitin. When they mature, some statoblasts stick to the parent colony, some fall to the bottom ("sessoblasts"), some contain air spaces that enable them to float ("floatoblasts"), and some remain in the parent's cystid to re-build the colony if it dies. Statoblasts can remain dormant for considerable periods, and while dormant can survive harsh conditions such as freezing and desiccation. They can be transported across long distances by animals, floating vegetation, currents and winds, and even in the guts of larger animals. When conditions improve, the valves of the shell separate and the cells inside develop into a zooid that tries to form a new colony. Plumatella emarginata produces both "sessoblasts", which enable the lineage to control a good territory even if hard times decimate the parent colonies, and "floatoblasts", which spread to new sites. New colonies of Plumatella repens produce mainly "sessoblasts" while mature ones switch to "floatoblasts". A study estimated that one group of colonies in a patch measuring 1 square meter (11 sq ft) produced 800,000 statoblasts.

Cupuladriid Bryozoa are capable of both sexual and asexual reproduction. The sexually reproducing colonies (aclonal) are the result of a larval cupuladriid growing into an adult stage whereas the asexual colonies(clonal) are a result of a fragment of a colony of cupuladriids growing into its own colony. The different forms of reproduction in cupuladriids are achieved through a variety of methods depending on the morphology and classification of the zooid.

== Ecology ==
=== Habitats and distribution ===
Most marine species live in tropical waters at depths less than 100 meters (330 ft; 55 fathoms). However, a few have been found in deep-sea trenches, especially around cold seeps, and others near the poles.

The great majority of bryozoans are sessile. Typically, sessile bryozoans live on hard substrates including rocks, sand or shells. Boring bryozoans leave unique borehole traces after dissolving calcium carbonate substrates. Encrusting forms are much the commonest of these in shallow seas, but erect forms become more common as the depth increases. An example of incrustation on pebbles and cobbles is found in the diverse Pleistocene bryozoans found in northern Japan, where fossils have been found of single stones covered with more than 20 bryozoan species. Sediments with smaller particles, like sand or silt, are usually unsuitable habitat for bryozoans, but tiny colonies have been found encrusting grains of coarse sand. Some bryozoan species specialize in colonizing marine algae, seagrasses, and even mangrove roots; the genus Amphibiobeania lives on the leaves of mangrove trees and is called "amphibious" because it can survive regular exposure to air at low tide.

There are a variety of "free-living" bryozoans that live un-attached to a substrate. A few forms such as Cristatella can move. Lunulitiform cheilostomes are one group of free-living bryozoans with mobile colonies. They form small round colonies un-attached to any substrate; colonies of the genus Selenaria have been observed to "walk" around using setae. Another cheilostome family, the Cupuladriidae, convergently evolved similarly shaped colonies capable of movement. When observed in an aquarium, Selenaria maculata colonies were recorded to crawl at a speed of one meter per hour, climb over each other, move toward light, and right themselves when turned upside-down. Later study of this genus showed that neuroelectrical activity in the colonies increased in correlation with movement toward light sources. It is theorized that the capacity for movement arose as a side effect when colonies evolved longer setae for unburying themselves from sediment.

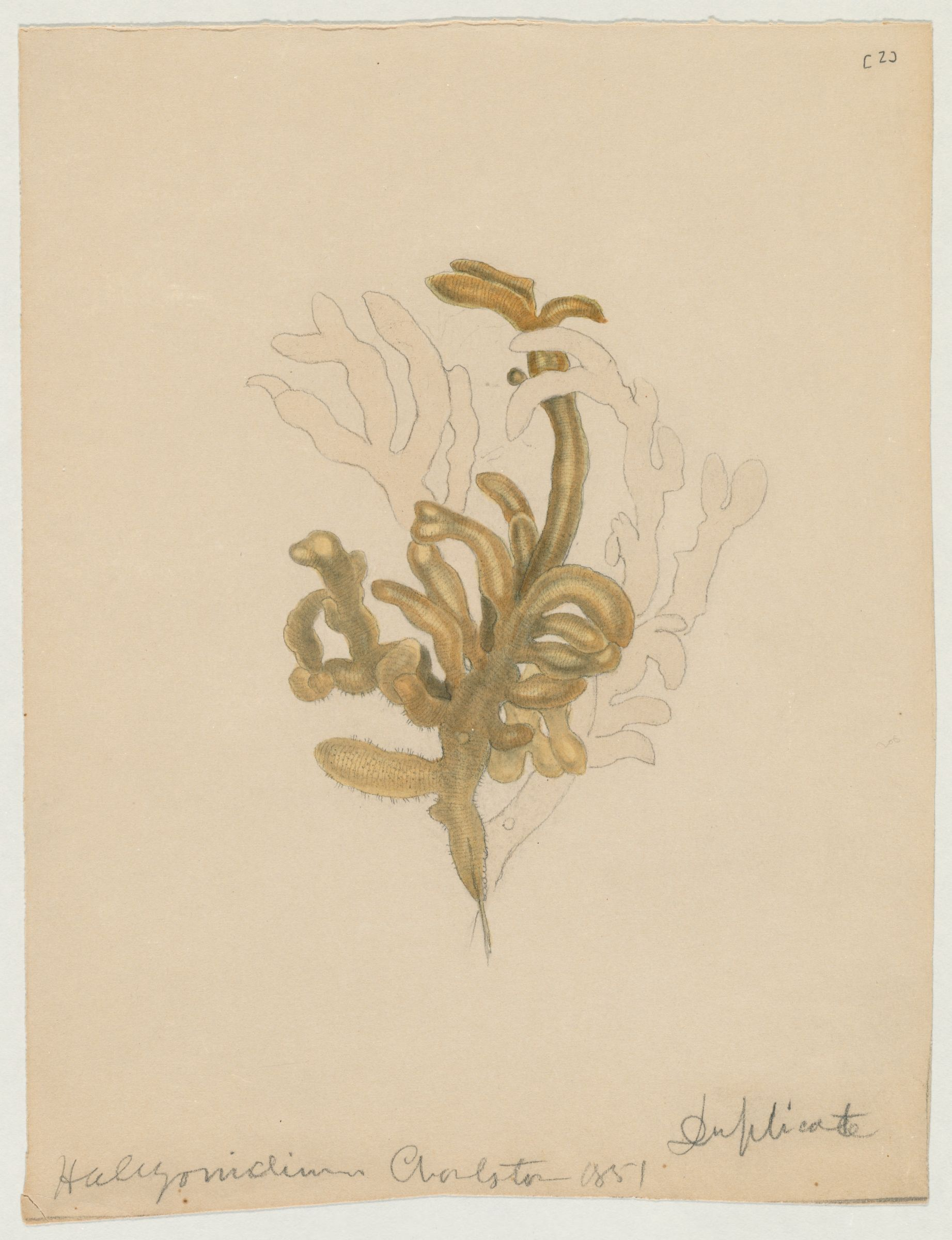
1851 watercolor of Alcyonidium by Jacques Burkhardt.

Other free-living bryozoans are moved freely by waves, currents, or other phenomena. An Antarctic species, Alcyonidium pelagosphaera, consists of floating colonies. The pelagic species is between 5.0 and 23.0 mm (0.20 and 0.91 in) in diameter, has the shape of a hollow sphere and consists of a single layer of autozooids. It is still not known if these colonies are pelagic their whole life or only represents a temporarily and previously undescribed juvenile stage. Colonies of the species Alcyonidium disciforme, which is disc-shaped and similarly free-living, inhabit muddy seabeds in the Arctic and can sequester sand grains they have engulfed, potentially using the sand as ballast to turn themselves right-side-up after they have been overturned. Some bryozoan species can form bryoliths, sphere-shaped free-living colonies that grow outward in all directions as they roll about on the seabed.

In 2014 it was reported that the bryozoan Fenestrulina rugula had become a dominant species in parts of Antarctica. Global warming has increased the rate of scouring by icebergs, and this species is particularly adept at recolonizing scoured areas.

The phylactolaemates live in all types of freshwater environment – lakes and ponds, rivers and streams, and estuaries – and are among the most abundant sessile freshwater animals. Some ctenostomes are exclusively freshwater while others prefer brackish water but can survive in freshwater. Scientists' knowledge of freshwater bryozoan populations in many parts of the world is incomplete, even in some parts of Europe. It was long thought that some freshwater species occurred worldwide, but since 2002 all of these have been split into more localized species.

Bryozoans grow in clonal colonies. A larval Bryozoan settles on a hard substance and produces a colony asexually through budding. These colonies can grow thousands of individual zooids. Even though colonies of zooids grow through asexual reproduction, Bryozoans are hermaphrodites and new colonies can be formed through sexual reproduction and the generation of free swimming larvae. When colonies grow too large, however, they can split in two. This is the only case where asexual reproduction results in a new colony separate from its predecessor. Most colonies are stationary. Indeed, these colonies tend to be settled on immobile substances such as sediment and coarse substances. There are some colonies of freshwater species such as Cristatella mucedo that are able to move slowly on a creeping foot.

=== Interactions with non-human organisms ===
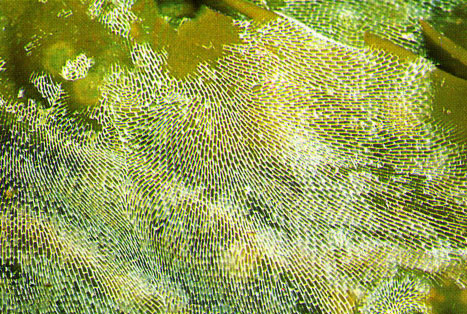
Lacelike Membranipora membranacea

Marine species are common on coral reefs, but seldom a significant proportion of the total biomass. In temperate waters, the skeletons of dead colonies form a significant component of shell gravels, and live ones are abundant in these areas. The marine lace-like bryozoan Membranipora membranacea produces spines in response to predation by several species of sea slugs (nudibranchs). Other predators on marine bryozoans include fish, sea urchins, pycnogonids, crustaceans, mites and starfish. In general marine echinoderms and molluscs eat masses of zooids by gouging pieces of colonies, breaking their mineralized "houses", while most arthropod predators on bryozoans eat individual zooids.

In freshwater, bryozoans are among the most important filter feeders, along with sponges and mussels. Freshwater bryozoans are attacked by many predators, including snails, insects, and fish.

In Thailand the introduced species Pomacea canaliculata (golden apple snail), which is generally a destructive herbivore, has wiped out phylactolaemate populations wherever it has appeared. P. canaliculata also preys on a common freshwater gymnolaemate, but with less devastating effect. Indigenous snails do not feed on bryozoans.

Several species of the hydroid family Zancleidae have symbiotic relationships with bryozoans, some of which are beneficial to the hydroids while others are parasitic. Modifications appear in the shapes of some these hydroids, for example smaller tentacles or encrustation of the roots by bryozoans. The bryozoan Alcyonidium nodosum protects the whelk Burnupena papyracea against predation by the powerful and voracious rock lobster Jasus lalandii. While whelk shells encrusted by the bryozoans are stronger than those without this reinforcement, chemical defenses produced by the bryozoans are probably the more significant deterrent.

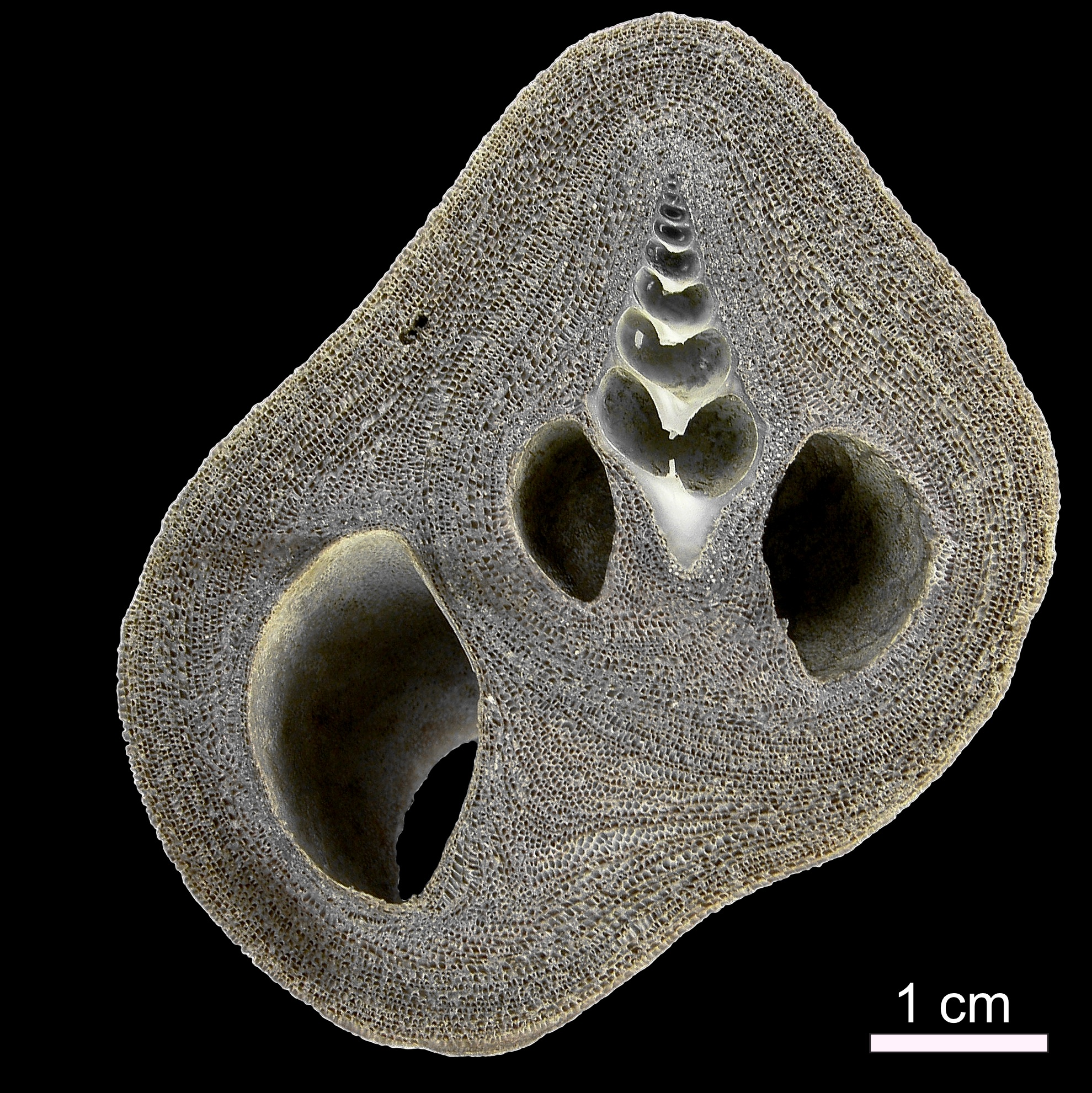
Mauritanian bryolith formed by circumrotatory growth of the bryozoan species Acanthodesia commensale

In the Banc d'Arguin offshore Mauritania the species Acanthodesia commensale, which is generally growing attached to gravel and hard-substrate, has formed a facultative symbiotic relationship with hermit crabs of the species Pseudopagurus cf. granulimanus resulting in egg-size structures known as bryoliths. Nucleating on an empty gastropod shell, the bryozoan colonies form multilamellar skeletal crusts that produce spherical encrustations and extend the living chamber of the hermit crab through helicospiral tubular growth.

Some phylactolaemate species are intermediate hosts for a group of myxozoa that have also been found to cause proliferative kidney disease, which is often fatal in salmonid fish, and has severely reduced wild fish populations in Europe and North America.

Membranipora membranacea, whose colonies feed and grow exceptionally fast in a wide range of current speeds, was first noticed in the Gulf of Maine in 1987 and quickly became the most abundant organism living on kelps. This invasion reduced the kelp population by breaking their fronds, so that its place as the dominant "vegetation" in some areas was taken by another invader, the large alga Codium fragile tomentosoides. These changes reduced the area of habitat available for local fish and invertebrates. M. membranacea has also invaded the northwest coast of the US. A few freshwater species have been also found thousands of kilometers from their native ranges. Some may have been transported naturally as statoblasts. Others more probably were spread by humans, for example on imported water plants or as stowaways on ships.

=== Interaction with humans ===
Fish farms and hatcheries have lost stock to proliferative kidney disease, which is caused by one or more myxozoans that use bryozoans as alternate hosts.

Some fishermen in the North Sea have had to find other work because of a form of eczema (a skin disease) known as "Dogger Bank itch", caused by contact with bryozoans that have stuck to nets and lobster pots.

Marine bryozoans are often responsible for biofouling on ships' hulls, on docks and marinas, and on offshore structures. They are among the first colonizers of new or recently cleaned structures. Freshwater species are occasional nuisances in water pipes, drinking water purification equipment, sewage treatment facilities, and the cooling pipes of power stations.

A group of chemicals called bryostatins can be extracted from the marine bryozoan Bugula neritina. In 2001 pharmaceutical company GPC Biotech licensed bryostatin 1 from Arizona State University for commercial development as a treatment for cancer. GPC Biotech canceled development in 2003, saying that bryostatin 1 showed little effectiveness and some toxic side effects. In January 2008 a clinical trial was submitted to the United States National Institutes of Health to measure the safety and effectiveness of Bryostatin 1 in the treatment of Alzheimer's disease. However, no participants had been recruited by the end of December 2008, when the study was scheduled for completion. More recent work shows it has positive effects on cognition in patients with Alzheimer's disease with few side effects. About 1,000 kilograms (2,200 lb) of bryozoans must be processed to extract 1 gram (1/32 oz) of bryostatin, As a result, synthetic equivalents have been developed that are simpler to produce and apparently at least as effective.

== See also ==
- International Bryozoology Association
- List of prehistoric bryozoan genera
- Colony (biology)

== Bibliography ==
- Taylor, Paul D. (2020). Bryozoan Paleobiology. London: Natural History Museum. ISBN 9781118455005.

=== Further reading ===
- Hall, S.R.; Taylor, P.D.; Davis, SA; Mann, S (2002). "Electron diffraction studies of the calcareous skeletons of bryozoans". Journal of Inorganic Biochemistry. 88 (3–4): 410–419. Bibcode:2002JIBio..88..410H. doi:10.1016/S0162-0134(01)00359-2. PMID 11897358.
- Hayward, P.G., J.S. Ryland and P.D. Taylor (eds.), 1992. Biology and Palaeobiology of Bryozoans, Olsen and Olsen, Fredensborg, Denmark. ISBN 9788785215239
- Winston, J. E. (2010). "Life in the Colonies: Learning the Alien Ways of Colonial Organisms". Integrative and Comparative Biology. 50 (6): 919–933. doi:10.1093/icb/icq146. PMID 21714171.
- Robison, R.A. (ed.), 1983. Treatise on Invertebrate Paleontology, Part G, Bryozoa (revised). Geological Society of America and University of Kansas Press. ISBN 978-0-8137-3107-0.
- Sharp, J. H.; Winson, M. K.; Porter, J. S. (2007). "Bryozoan metabolites: An ecological perspective" (PDF). Natural Product Reports. 24 (4): 659–673. doi:10.1039/b617546e. hdl:2160/3792. PMID 17653353. Archived (PDF) from the original on 9 October 2022.
- Taylor, P; Wilson, M. A. (2003). "Palaeoecology and evolution of marine hard substrate communities" (PDF). Earth-Science Reviews. 62 (1): 1–103. Bibcode:2003ESRv...62....1T. doi:10.1016/S0012-8252(02)00131-9. Archived from the original (PDF) on 25 March 2009.
- Vinn, Olev; Wilson, Mark A.; Mõtus, Mari-Ann; Toom, Ursula (2014). "The earliest bryozoan parasite: Middle Ordovician (Darriwilian) of Osmussaar Island, Estonia". Palaeogeography, Palaeoclimatology, Palaeoecology. 414: 129–132. Bibcode:2014PPP...414..129V. doi:10.1016/j.palaeo.2014.08.021.
- Woollacott, R.M. and R.L. Zimmer (eds), 1977. The Biology of Bryozoans, Academic Press, New York. ISBN 9780127631509
