= Phoronis (disambiguation) =

- Phoronis is a genus of the horseshoe worm family (Phoronidae), in the phylum Phoronida.

Phoronis may also refer to:

- Various species in the above genus:

- Phoronis australis
- Phoronis ovalis
- Phoronis psammophila

- Phoronis (c. 7th-6th c. BC), an ancient Greek epic poem which told the story of the mythological hero Phoroneus.
- Phoronis (5th c. BC), a lost work by the Greek historian Hellanicus.
- Phoronis, a name for Io, the sister (or descendant) of Phoroneus.
