= Phoronis emigi =

Scientific classification
- Domain: Eukaryota
- Kingdom: Animalia
- Phylum: Phoronida
- Family: Phoronidae
- Genus: Phoronis
- Species: P. emigi

Binomial name
- Phoronis emigi Hirose, Fukiage, Katoh & Kajihara, 2014

Species of phoronid

Phoronis emigi is a species of marine horseshoe worm in the phylum Phoronida. It is found off the coast of Japan and is morphologically similar to Phoronis psammophila.
