= Phoronis embryolabi =

Scientific classification
- Domain: Eukaryota
- Kingdom: Animalia
- Phylum: Phoronida
- Family: Phoronidae
- Genus: Phoronis
- Species: P. embryolabi

Binomial name
- Phoronis embryolabi Temereva & Chichvarkhin, 2017

Species of phoronid

Phoronis embryolabi is a species of marine horseshoe worm in the phylum Phoronida. It is found in Vostok Bay, where it lives together with Nihonotrypaea japonica, an Axiidea shrimp species, in its burrows.

A phylogenetic analysis in 2018 suggests that Phoronis embryolabi is most closely related to Phoronis pallida.
