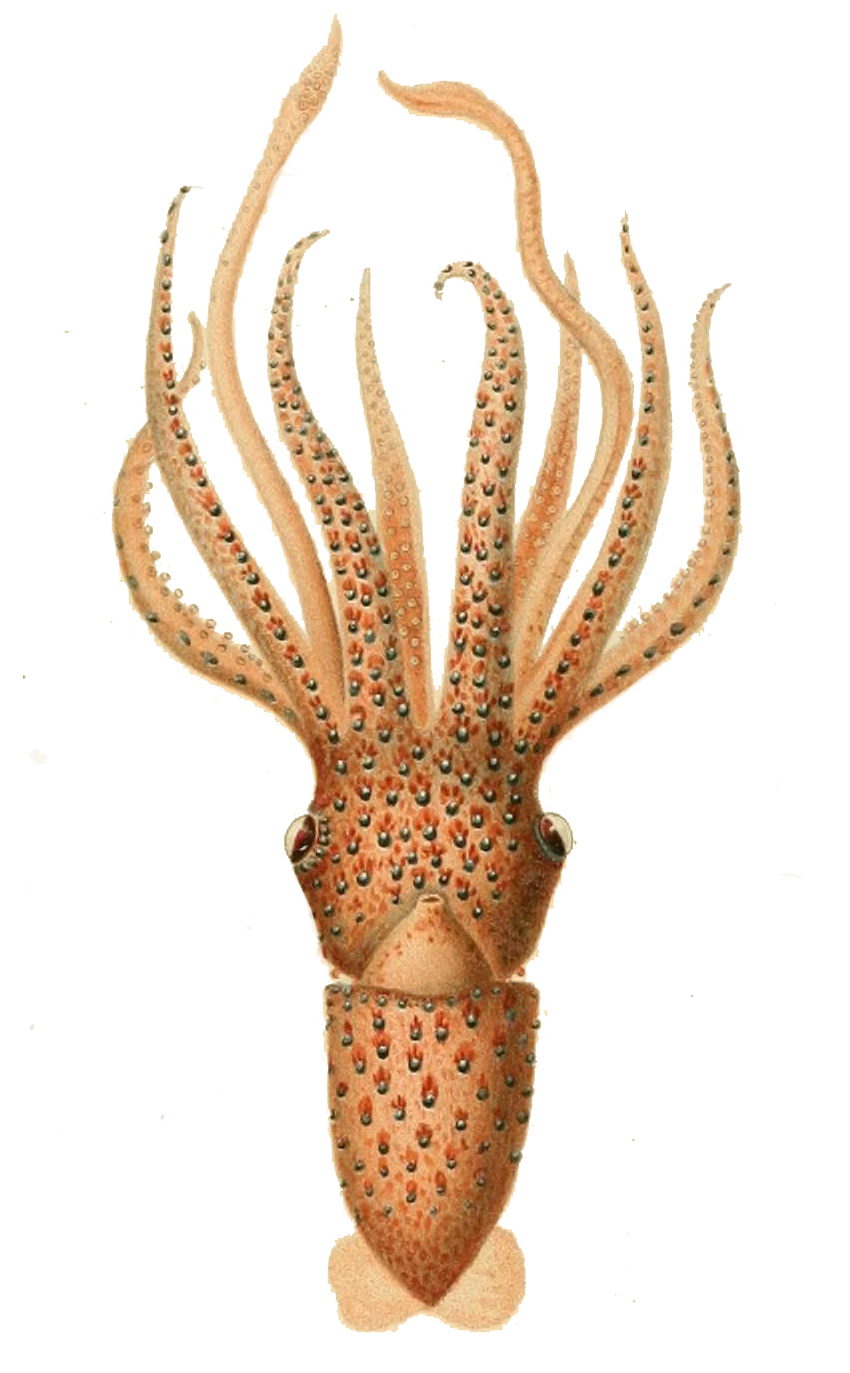
- Stigmatoteuthis hoylei

Scientific classification
- Domain: Eukaryota
- Kingdom: Animalia
- Phylum: Mollusca
- Class: Cephalopoda
- Order: Oegopsida
- Family: Histioteuthidae
- Genus: Stigmatoteuthis; Pfeffer, 1900

Type species
- Histiopsis hoylei Goodrich, 1896

= Stigmatoteuthis =

Genus of squids

Stigmatoteuthis is a genus of squid from the family Histioteuthidae. They occur in the Oceans from the tropics south to the temperate seas.

== Species ==
There are three species in the genus Stigmatoteuthis:

- Stigmatoteuthis arcturi Robson, 1948
- Stigmatoteuthis dofleini Pfeffer, 1912
- Stigmatoteuthis hoylei (Goodrich, 1896)
