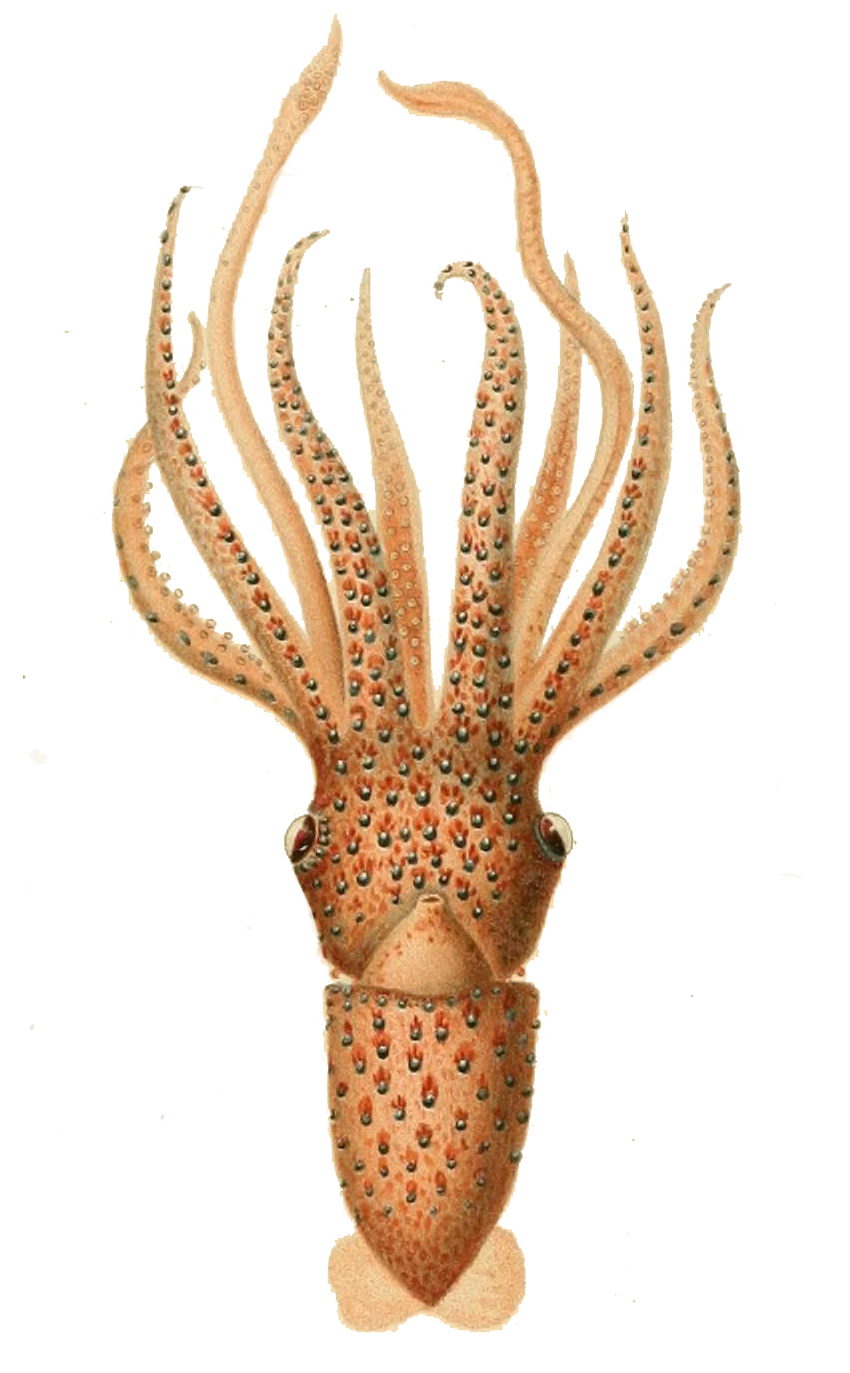

Conservation status
- Least Concern (IUCN 3.1)

Scientific classification
- Kingdom: Animalia
- Phylum: Mollusca
- Class: Cephalopoda
- Order: Oegopsida
- Family: Histioteuthidae
- Genus: Stigmatoteuthis
- Species: S. hoylei

Binomial name
- Stigmatoteuthis hoylei (Goodrich, 1896)

Synonyms
- Histiopsis hoylei Goodrich, 1896 Histioteuthis hoylei (Goodrich, 1896) Meleagroteuthis hoylei Pfeffer, 1908

= Stigmatoteuthis hoylei =

Flowervase jewel squid

Species of squid

Stigmatoteuthis hoylei, commonly called the flowervase jewel squid, is a species of cock-eyed squid. It is native to tropical and subtropical waters of the Indian and Pacific Oceans. It grows to 20 cm (7.9 in) in mantle length. The eyes of this species are highly dimorphic.
