= Phoronis savinkini =

Scientific classification
- Domain: Eukaryota
- Kingdom: Animalia
- Phylum: Phoronida
- Family: Phoronidae
- Genus: Phoronis
- Species: P. savinkini

Binomial name
- Phoronis savinkini Temereva & Neklyudov, 2018

Species of phoronid

Phoronis savinkini is a species of marine horseshoe worm in the phylum Phoronida. It is found in the Gulf of Tonkin. The holotype was collected off the coast of Vân Đồn District, Quang Ninh Province in northern Vietnam.
