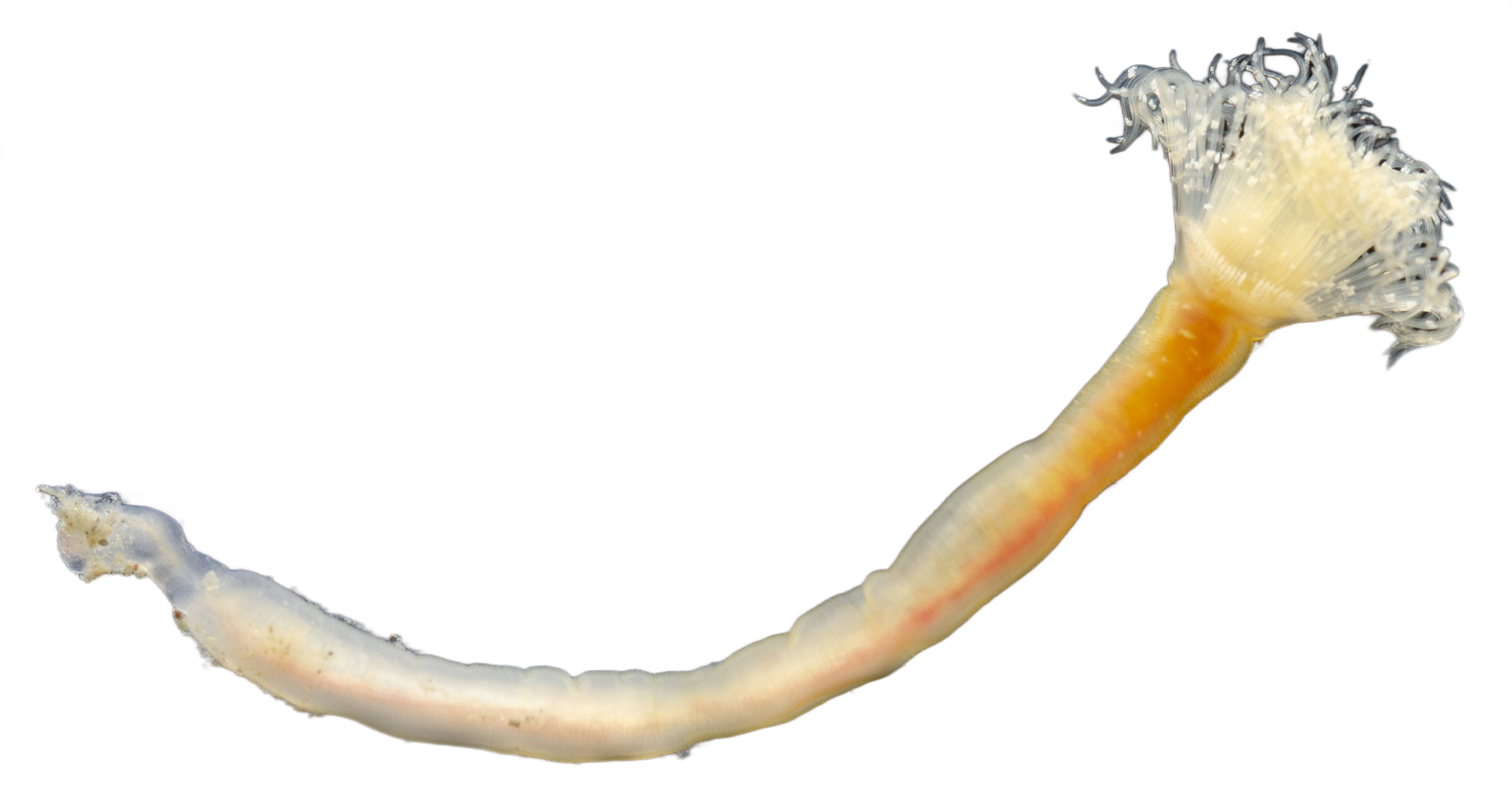

Scientific classification
- Kingdom: Animalia
- Phylum: Phoronida
- Family: Phoronidae
- Genus: Phoronopsis
- Species: P. harmeri

Binomial name
- Phoronopsis harmeri Pixell, 1912

Synonyms
- Phoronopsis malakhovi Temereva, 2000

= Phoronopsis harmeri =

Species of phoronid

Phoronopsis harmeri is a species of marine horseshoe worm in the phylum Phoronida. It was first described by Helen Lucia Mary Pixell in 1912, and was found off of Vancouver Island.

== Ecology ==
This species has been found around the world in coastal habitats.

Like other Lophophorata, P. harmeli is a filter feeder. They have been known to various bacteria and other planktonic organisms with a size range of 1.2–12 μm.

== Development ==
Larvae have a minor nerve ring. During larval development, serotonin-like immunoreactive parts of the nervous system change.
