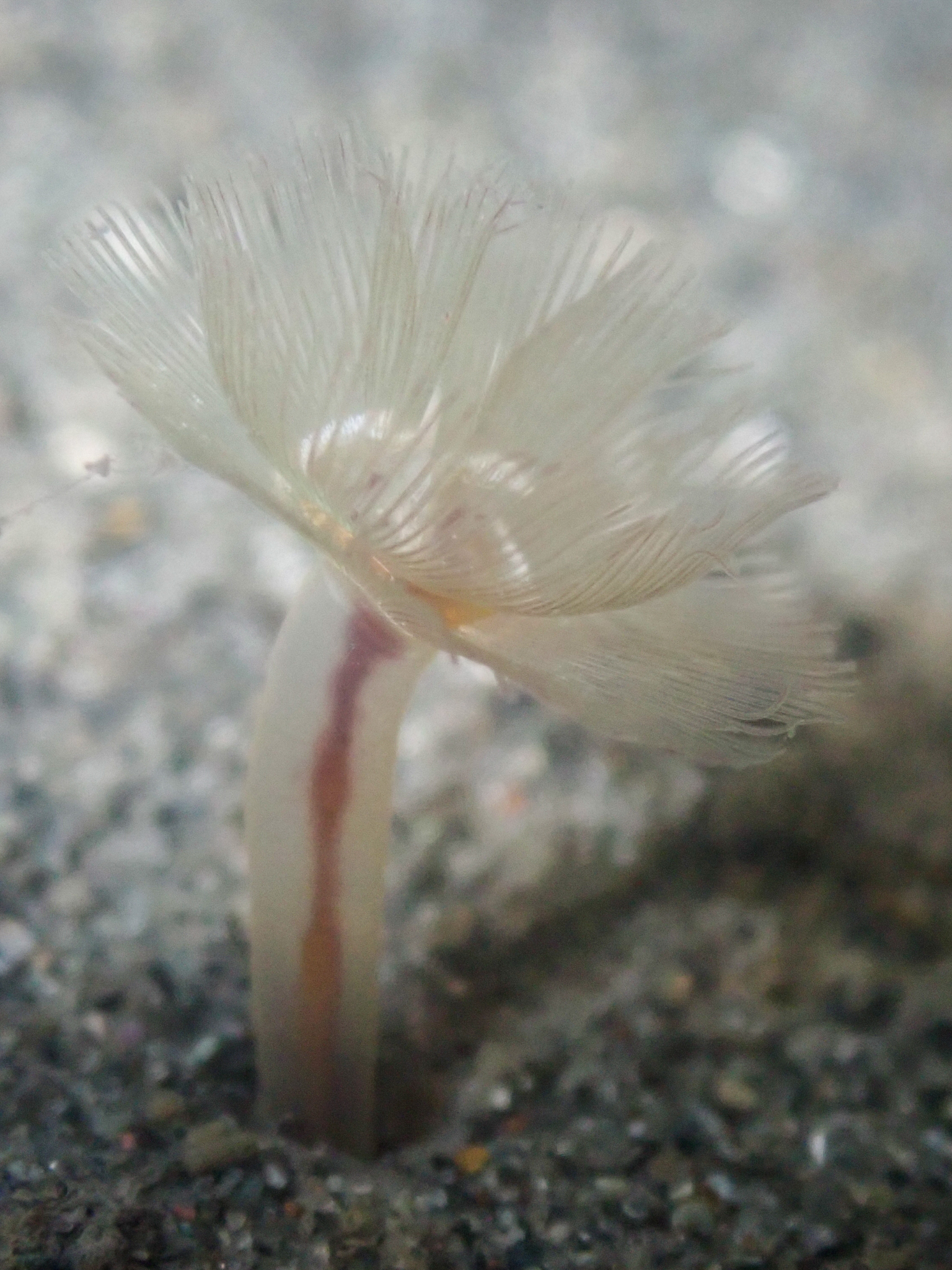
- Phoronopsis harmeri

Scientific classification
- Kingdom: Animalia
- Phylum: Phoronida
- Family: Phoronidae
- Genus: Phoronopsis; Gilchrist, 1907

Type species
- Phoronopsis albomaculata Gilchrist, 1907

= Phoronopsis =

Genus of worms

Phoronopsis is a genus of horseshoe worm in the family Phoronidae, in the phylum Phoronida. The members of the genus live in tubes at the bottom of the sea.

== Characteristics ==
Like other phoronids, members of this genus are benthic filter feeders with a worm-like body encased in a loosely fitting chitinous tube. The tube is buried in the substrate, and the worm is anchored to the tube by an ampulla, the swollen part of its abdomen. The genus is characterised by the epidermis folding under itself at the collar beneath the lophophore (feeding organ). This distinguishes it from the genus Phoronis. The gut is U-shaped, with the anus close to the mouth. The larval form, found in the zooplankton, is known as an "actinotroch".

== Distribution ==
The distribution is global.

== Species ==
- Phoronopsis albomaculata Gilchrist, 1907
- Phoronopsis californica Hilton, 1930
- Phoronopsis harmeri Pixell, 1912 (possible synonym Phoronopsis malakhovi Temereva, 2000)

A 2018 phylogenetic analysis indicates that Phoronopsis is a monophyletic genus, while Phoronis is paraphyletic.
