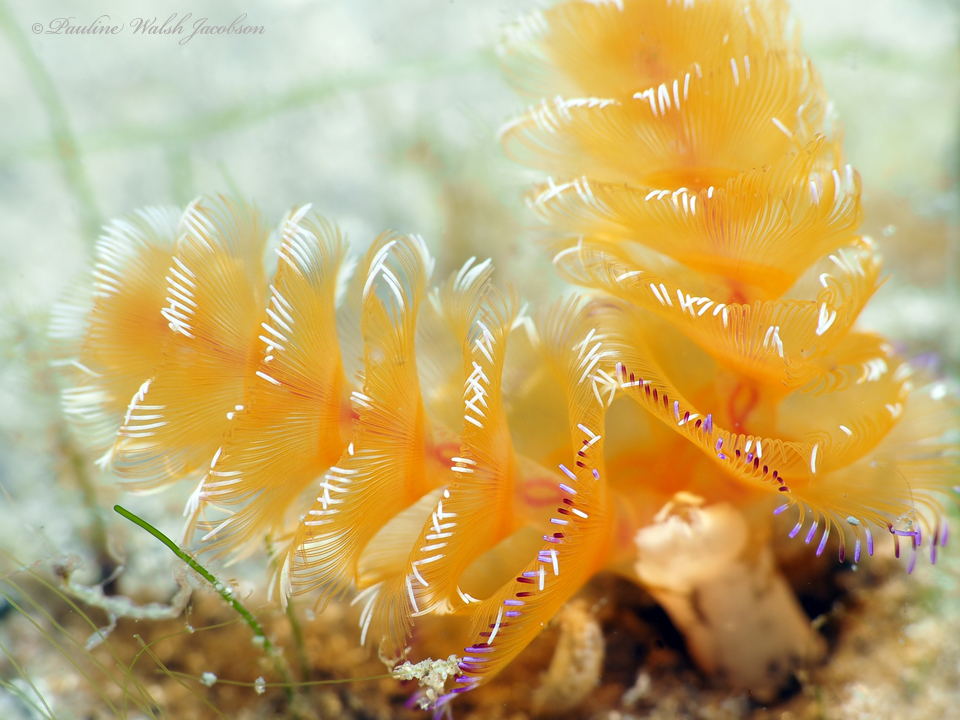

Scientific classification
- Domain: Eukaryota
- Kingdom: Animalia
- Phylum: Phoronida
- Family: Phoronidae
- Genus: Phoronopsis
- Species: P. californica

Binomial name
- Phoronopsis californica Hilton, 1930

= Phoronopsis californica =

Species of horseshoe worm

Phoronopsis californica is a species of marine horseshoe worm in the phylum Phoronida. It was first described as a new species by William Hilton in 1930 when he found it at Balboa Bay in Newport Beach, California.

== Description ==
Phoronopsis californica lives in a stiff tube encrusted with sand and embedded in sandy or muddy sediment. The tube is up to 250 millimetres long, 3 millimetres wide at the open end and twice this diameter in the middle. There is a bulge at the other end, which is sealed. At the collar, just below the lophophore or feeding organ, the worm has the marked involution of the epidermis which distinguishes the genus Phoronopsis. When the worm is extended it can reach 450 millimetres in length with a diameter of up to 5 millimetres. The colour varies but is usually orangish-brown with a red, orange or green lophophore. This organ has about 1,500 tentacles, each some 2.5 millimetres long, arranged in a pair of helicoid whorls with four to seven coils. These project from the seabed and are the only part of the animal normally visible. They can be retracted back into the tube if danger threatens or when the animal is no longer submerged.

== Distribution and habitat ==
Phoronopsis californica occurs in shallow coastal waters in California and in temperate European waters near Spain, Portugal and Madeira. It lives singly and builds its tube in soft sediments varying from mud to coarse sand. It is found on the lower shore and in the neritic zone down to a depth of thirty metres. In the Mediterranean Sea it is found growing in association with the sea grass, Cymodocea nodosa.

== Biology ==
Phoronopsis californica is a filter feeder. Numerous cilia on the tentacles create a current which brings food particles within reach. These then get trapped in mucus and moved towards the mouth. At the same time, the tentacles act as gills for gas exchange.

Individual worms are either male or female but little is known of the process of reproduction in this species and the larval form, Actinotrocha californica, has not yet been identified.
