= Hederopsis =

Hederopsis Temporal range: Devonian

Scientific classification
- Kingdom: Animalia
- Phylum: Phoronida (?)
- Suborder: †Hederelloidea
- Family: †Reptariidae
- Genus: †Hederopsis; Bassler, 1939

Genus of lophotrochs

Hederopsis is an extinct genus of the enigmatic hederellids.
