= Azeia =

Azeia (Ancient Greek: Ἄζεια) was a town of the ancient Troad.

It was a member of the Delian League; the inhabitants of Azeia are cited in the tribute records of Athens between the years 452/1 and 415/4 BCE. The inhabitants are supposed to be identified with the demonym Azeiotai (Ἀζειώται) mentioned by Stephanus of Byzantium, quoting a fragment of Hellanicus of Lesbos. It has also been related to the patronymic "Azida", mentioned by Homer in the Iliad.

Its site is unlocated.
