= Stigmatoteuthis dofleini =

Conservation status
- Least Concern (IUCN 3.1)

Scientific classification
- Kingdom: Animalia
- Phylum: Mollusca
- Class: Cephalopoda
- Order: Oegopsida
- Family: Histioteuthidae
- Genus: Stigmatoteuthis
- Species: S. dofleini

Binomial name
- Stigmatoteuthis dofleini Pfeffer, 1912

Synonyms
- Histioteuthis dofleini (Pfeffer, 1912)

Species of cephalopod

Stigmatoteuthis dofleini is a species of cock-eyed squid in the family Histioteuthidae.
