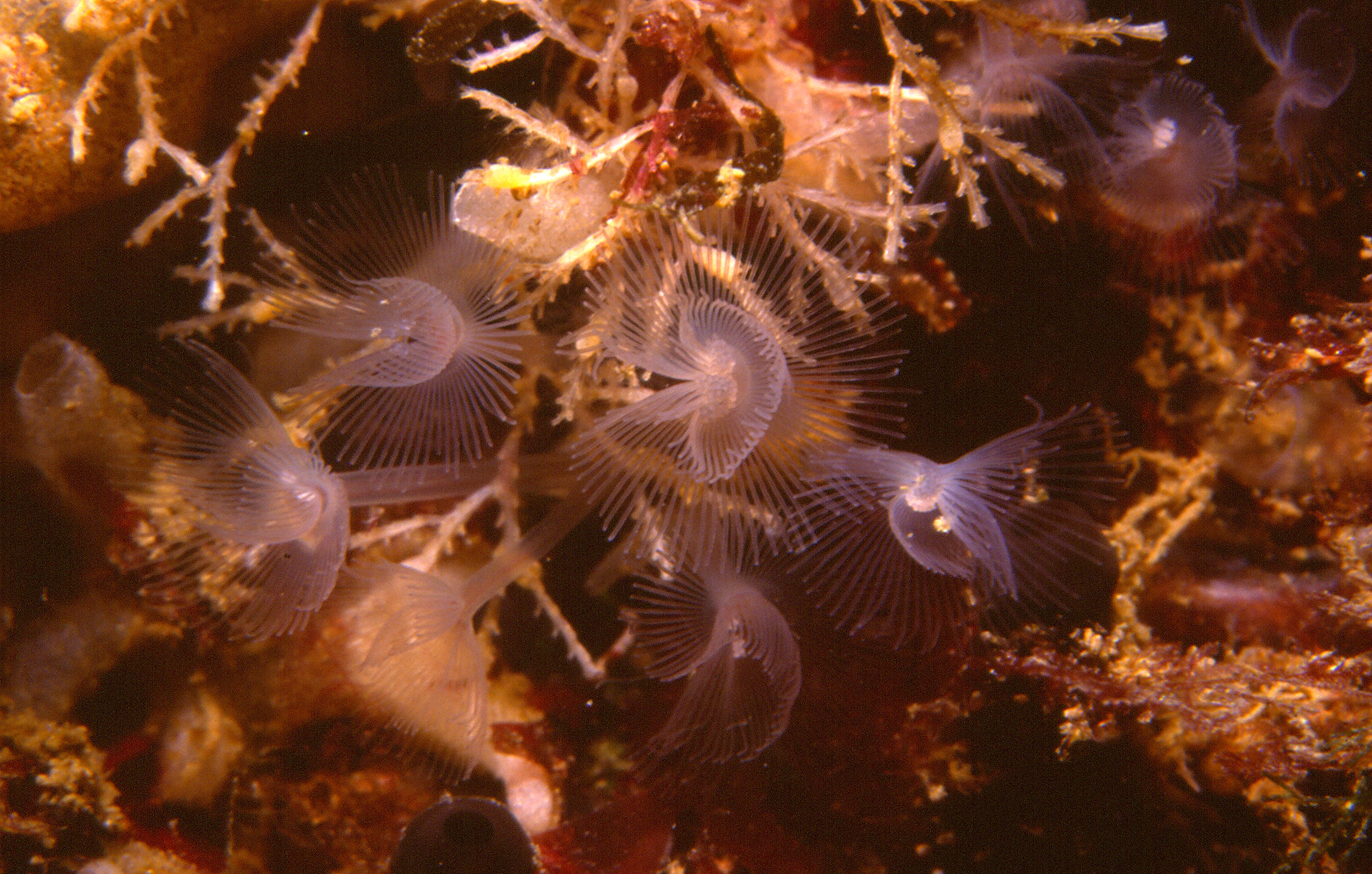

Scientific classification
- Domain: Eukaryota
- Kingdom: Animalia
- Phylum: Phoronida
- Family: Phoronidae
- Genus: Phoronis
- Species: P. hippocrepia

Binomial name
- Phoronis hippocrepia Wright, 1856

= Phoronis hippocrepia =

Species of phoronid

Phoronis hippocrepia is a species of marine horseshoe worm in the phylum Phoronida.
