= Phoronis muelleri =

Scientific classification
- Domain: Eukaryota
- Kingdom: Animalia
- Phylum: Phoronida
- Family: Phoronidae
- Genus: Phoronis
- Species: P. muelleri

Binomial name
- Phoronis muelleri Selys-Lonchamps, 1903

Species of phoronid

Phoronis muelleri is a species of marine horseshoe worm in the phylum Phoronida. Like most phoronids, Phoronis muelleri has a biphasic life-cycle consisting of a pelagic larval stage, the actinotrocha, and a benthic, sessile adult stage.
