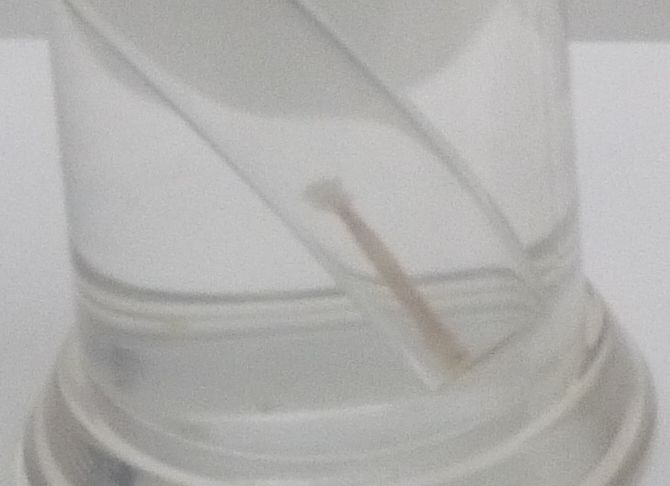
- Specimen at Osaka Museum of Natural History

Scientific classification
- Domain: Eukaryota
- Kingdom: Animalia
- Phylum: Phoronida
- Family: Phoronidae
- Genus: Phoronis
- Species: P. australis

Binomial name
- Phoronis australis Haswell, 1883

Synonyms
- Phoronis bhadurii Ganguly & Majumbar, 1967; Phoronis buskii McIntosh, 1888

= Phoronis australis =

Species of horseshoe worm

Phoronis australis is a species of marine horseshoe worm in the phylum Phoronida. It is found in shallow warm-temperate and tropical waters in the eastern Atlantic Ocean and the Indo-Pacific region and was first detected in the Mediterranean Sea in the late twentieth century. These worms live in association with tube-dwelling anemones, particularly those in the genus Cerianthus.

== Description ==
Phoronis australis grows to a length of about 200 mm (8 in) when extended, with a diameter of about 2 to 5 mm (0.1 to 0.2 in). The lophophore takes the form of a double spiral and there are up to one thousand tentacles on either side. The colour is variable and may be pink, dark red or black.

== Distribution and habitat ==
Phoronis australis is native to the Indo-Pacific region and the southeastern Atlantic Ocean. Since the 1990s it has appeared in the Mediterranean Sea, presumably arriving via the Strait of Gibraltar as early records were from Spain. In the Mediterranean, it is normally associated with the tube-dwelling anemone Cerianthus membranaceus, with typically, about eight individual horseshoe worms being present on the tube of each host. However, it has also been recorded as living independently in muddy coarse sand in the Mediterranean, the tube being attached to the seagrass Posidonia oceanica.

== Ecology ==
Phoronis australis secretes a chitinous tube into which it can retreat when disturbed. The tube is attached to the much larger tube of a tube-dwelling anemone which lives in shallow sheltered water immersed in soft sediment. Many horseshoe worms may be associated with a single ceriantharian anemone. The lophophore of the horseshoe worm is extended to catch the planktonic particles on which it feeds. It benefits from the protection provided by the canopy of anemone tentacles and is alerted to danger by the reactions of the anemone in withdrawing into its tube when disturbed. The anemone probably derives no benefit from the inquiline association.

Phoronis australis is a hermaphrodite. The embryos are at first brooded in two clumps on mucus threads secreted by nidamental glands. The actinotroch larvae are planktonic and eventually settle and undergo metamorphosis. The horseshoe worm can also reproduce asexually by transverse fission.
