= Phoronis ovalis =

Scientific classification
- Domain: Eukaryota
- Kingdom: Animalia
- Phylum: Phoronida
- Family: Phoronidae
- Genus: Phoronis
- Species: P. ovalis

Binomial name
- Phoronis ovalis Wright, 1856

Species of horseshoe worm

Phoronis ovalis is a species of marine horseshoe worm in the phylum Phoronida. It is found in shallow waters in the northeastern Atlantic Ocean, the southeastern Atlantic Ocean, Argentina, and other scattered locations worldwide. These worms secrete a tube into which they can retreat, and burrow into the shells of molluscs.

== Description ==
Phoronis ovalis is the smallest known species of horseshoe worms, growing to an extended length of 15 mm (0.6 in) and a diameter of 0.15 to 0.35 mm (0.006 to 0.014 in). It exhibits many primitive traits. The lophophore is simple and oval in shape, with 11 to 28 tentacles. The giant nerve fibre typical of the genus is not present. The animal is transparent, sometimes with a brownish lophophore. The haemal, excretory and nervous systems are bilaterally symmetrical, which is not the case with other members of the genus.

== Ecology ==
Phoronis ovalis is believed to be a hermaphrodite, and the embryos are brooded in the tube. Asexual reproduction can also take place, either by budding or by transverse fission. The lophophore is used for feeding and for gas exchange. Under adverse conditions, the lophophore is readily autotomised; the animal can regenerate its lophophore and the shed lophophore can grow a new body.

In 2010 it was reported that Phoronis ovalis was present in beds of molluscs off the coast of Namibia, it having not previously been recorded in Africa. The brown mussel (Perna perna) was the mollusc most frequently found acting as a host, and in one mussel bed, 99% of the mussels exhibited the 0.2 mm (0.008 in) boreholes made by the horseshoe worm. Other hosts included three other species of bivalve molluscs, four species of gastropod mollusc and one barnacle species.
