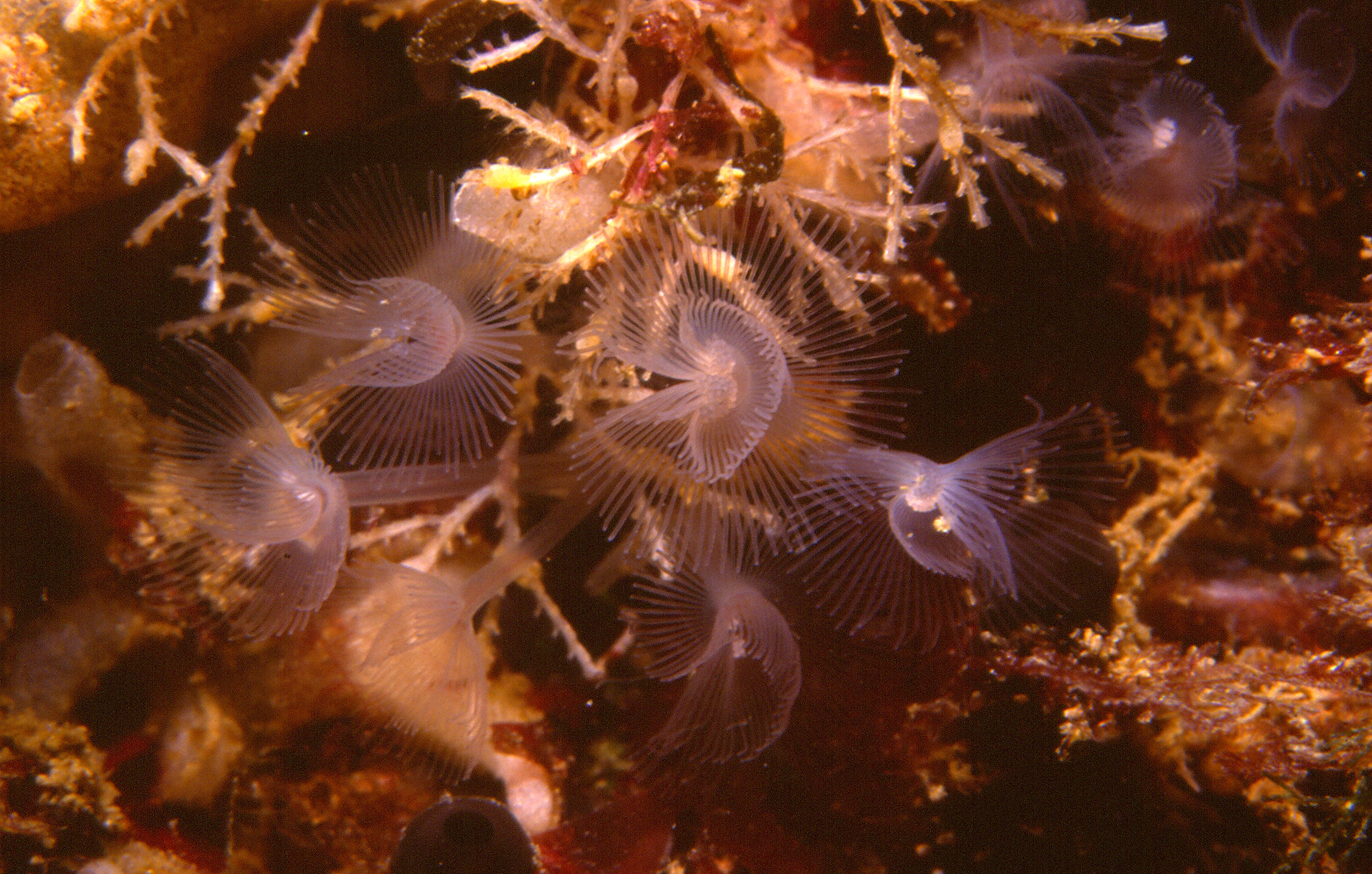
- Phoronis hippocrepia

Scientific classification
- Kingdom: Animalia
- Phylum: Phoronida
- Family: Phoronidae
- Genus: Phoronis; Wright 1856

Type species
- Phoronis ovalis Wright 1856

Species
- see text

Synonyms
- Actinotrocha Müller 1846; Phoronella Haeckel 1896

= Phoronis =

Genus of worms

Phoronis is one of the two genera of the horseshoe worm family (Phoronidae), in the phylum Phoronida. The body has two sections, each with its own coelom. There is a specialist feeding structure, the lophophore, which is an extension of the wall of the coelom and is surrounded by tentacles. The gut is U-shaped. The diagnostic feature that distinguishes this genus is the lack of epidermal invagination at the base of the lophophore. These worms are filter feeders. They live on hard substrates or soft sediments in marine environments throughout the world. They have different modes of reproduction which help with their success.

The scientific name of the larval form is Actinotrocha.

== Etymology ==
The generic name refers to Phoronis (better known as Io), a Greek mythological character sometimes conflated with Isis. Thomas Strethill Wright, of Edinburgh, did not give a specific reason for choosing the name.

== Species ==
- Phoronis australis Haswell 1883
- Phoronis embryolabi Temereva & Chichvarkhin, 2017
- Phoronis emigi Hirose et al. 2014
- Phoronis hippocrepia Wright 1856
- Phoronis ijimai Oka 1897
- Phoronis muelleri Selys-Lonchamps 1903
- Phoronis ovalis Wright 1856
- Phoronis pallida (Schneider 1862) Silén 1952
- Phoronis psammophila Cori 1889
- Phoronis savinkini Temereva & Neklyudov, 2018

Phoronis architecta is no longer accepted and is considered to be a synonym of Phoronis psammophila. Similarly Phoronis vancouverensis is considered to be a synonym of Phoronis ijimai.

A 2018 phylogenetic analysis indicates that Phoronis is paraphyletic, while Phoronopsis is a monophyletic genus.

== Distribution ==
Horseshoe worms are not very sensitive to environmental conditions and are therefore considered to be both eurythermic and euryhaline animals. While they are not very sensitive, there are some factors that can impact their distribution such as current strength (as they are filter feeders), the result of asexual reproduction, predation in the area, and local fauna which they may have to compete with. However, horseshoe worms have a relatively global distribution as they can be found in the Atlantic, Pacific, and Indian oceans.

== Structure ==
=== Tube ===
The horseshoe worms live in tubes that are fully imbedded in the soil and are formed during digging or boring. The tubes are produced by the worm's epidermal glands. These tubes have an inner organic cylinder and an outer layer. The inner layer is composed of three parts: the inner film, middle film, and outer film. These thin films are composed of fibers from the worms that form nets that make up these tubes.

=== Nervous and digestive systems ===
These worms have a nervous system that consists of a dorsal ganglion, a tentacle nerve ring, an inner nerve ring, intertentacular groups of perikarya, and tentacle nerves. These tentacles nerves have three groups: abfrontal, frontal, and laterofrontal. They have a U-shaped gut, meaning their anus is close in distance to their mouths and their digestive tract consists of three parts: the mouth, the stomach, and the anus.

=== Lophophore ===
The lophophore structure has evolved from a simple, oval shape to the horseshoe shape from which the worms get their name, even into a complex spiral structure. These worms can regenerate their lophophores when injured or even voluntarily drop their lophophores as Phoronis ovalis does when it is laying eggs. The lophophore is used for both respiration and feeding. The tentacles of the lophophores have cilia on them which move water towards their mouth to filter out small particulates. Through moving water over the tentacles of the lophophore, they act as an organ for gas exchange and allow oxygen into the blood as it passes through.

== Development ==
=== Embryos ===
Generally, Phoronis species have benthic adults with lecithotrophic larvae. These species incubate their embryos in various ways. Some species release their embryos into the water column and they develop there. In other species, embryos are incubated among the tentacles of the adult worms. Recently, it was discovered that some species even exhibit viviparity, where the embryos are incubated in the coelom of their mother's tube and the "hatch" to produce feeding actinotroch larvae. There is a correlation between egg size and development type: allowing embryos into the water column to develop takes less energy and can therefore produce more eggs. Incubating in the tube's coelom takes more energy so less eggs are produced.

=== Larvae ===
The lecithotrophic larvae, given the name actinotroch, are pelagic and float in the water column. This allows for wider dispersal of species. The larvae have also developed different morphologies over time such as differing pigmentation and arrangement of blood masses.

=== Adult ===
When they are full grown, these worms typically have thin but long bodies that can grow up to 50 cm. The adults are typically colonial and can grow around each other in order to support each other.

== Reproduction ==
Phoronis can be either gonochoristic or hermaphroditic. The worms create sperm and eggs through the processes of spermiogenesis and oogenesis. Spermiogenesis leads to the creation of a spermatophore, which is inserted into the metacoelom to combine with the eggs in two ways. The small fertilized eggs, numbering up to 500, are then released through spawning into the water column where the larvae develop over a period of 3 weeks before settling to change into the adult stage. Others lay fewer, larger eggs, and after fertilization, do not release them until they have hatched. These larvae are only in the water column for a period of 4 days before settling to find their home.

== Parasite ==
Some phoronid species have microsporidia-like spores that were discovered in 2017. This was the first recorded instance of phoronids being hosts to parasites. These microsporidia were named Microsporidium phoronidi.
