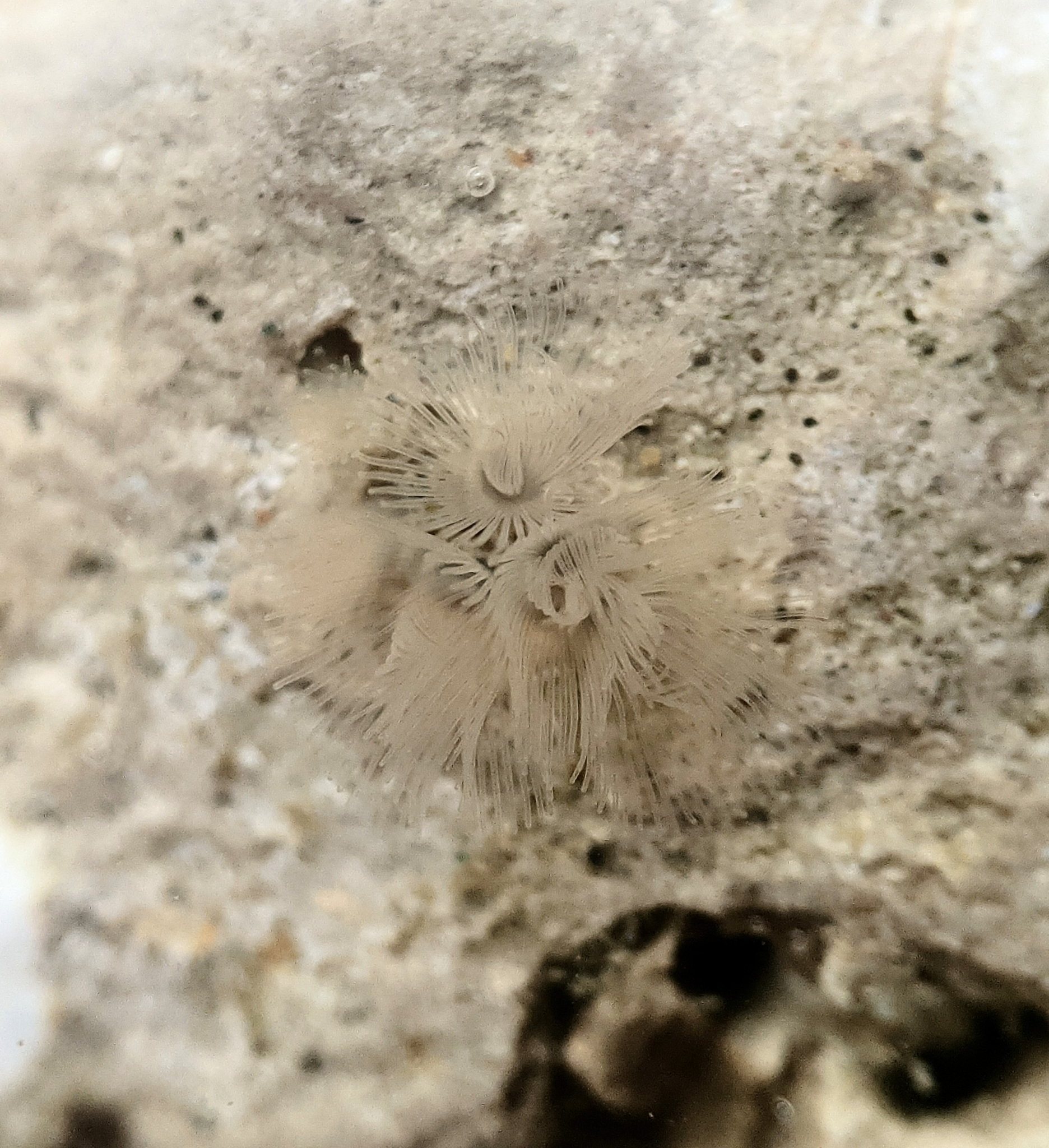
- Phoronis ijimai

Scientific classification
- Domain: Eukaryota
- Kingdom: Animalia
- Phylum: Phoronida
- Family: Phoronidae
- Genus: Phoronis
- Species: P. ijimai

Binomial name
- Phoronis ijimai Oka, 1897

= Phoronis ijimai =

Species of phoronid

Phoronis ijimai is a species of marine horseshoe worm in the phylum Phoronida.
