= Phoronopsis albomaculata =

Scientific classification
- Domain: Eukaryota
- Kingdom: Animalia
- Phylum: Phoronida
- Family: Phoronidae
- Genus: Phoronopsis
- Species: P. albomaculata

Binomial name
- Phoronopsis albomaculata Gilchrist, 1907

Species of phoronid

Phoronopsis albomaculata is a species of marine horseshoe worm in the phylum Phoronida.
