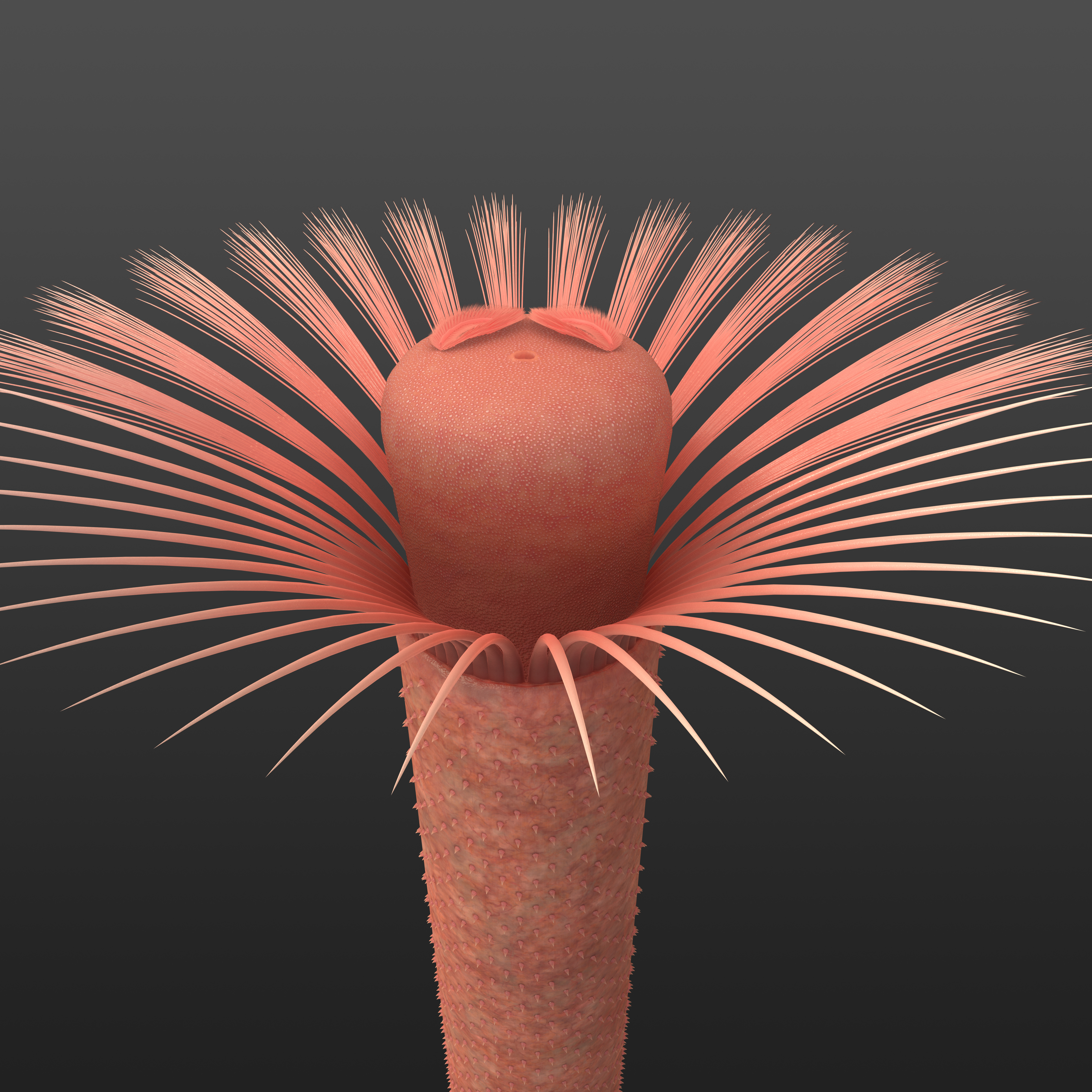
- Reconstruction of Iotuba: head and anterior trunk

Scientific classification
- Kingdom: Animalia
- Phylum: Annelida
- Clade: Pleistoannelida
- Clade: Sedentaria
- Order: Terebellida
- Genus: †Iotuba
- Species: †I. chengjiangensis

Binomial name
- †Iotuba chengjiangensis Zhang et Smith 2023

= Iotuba =

Iotuba Temporal range: Chengjiang
- Complete specimen of Iotuba from Chengjiang.

Cambrian taxon

Iotuba chengjiangensis (sometimes mis-spelt Lotuba) is a 515 million year old Cambrian worm known from the Chengjiang biota. Originally interpreted as a phoronid, the organism is now recognized as an annelid cage worm affiliated with the Flabelligeridae and Acrocirridae, which Zhang et al grouped together in the new superfamily Flabelligeroidea.

== Anatomy ==
Iotuba was a couple of centimetres long and half a centimetre in width. Internally it is characterized by a through gut flanked by a pair of boudinaged tubes interpreted as nephridia ("kidneys"). Its trunk is adorned with small conical papillae ("microspines"). Its "head" bears a pair of tentaculate, horseshoe-shaped branchiae ("gills"), and can be withdrawn into the body; it is surrounded by a cage of spines interpreted as chaetae, equivalent to those of the flabelligerid "cage worms".

== History of interpretation ==
Iotuba was originally interpreted as a phoronid based on a misinterpretation of the single then-available specimen as harbouring a U-shaped gut and tentacles – an interpretation that was soon thrown into question. The holotype was independently named – by the same author – as Eophoronis, but as neither of these nomenclatural acts contained a diagnosis, they were invalid under the International Code of Zoological Nomenclature until formally defined by Zhang et al. in 2023.

Previous comparisons to ecdysozoan worms such as Louisella. have been ruled out based on the construction of the anterior region and other morphological details. Instead, the organism has been linked with the cirratliform annelids, specifically Flabelligeridae – an interpretation that fits in with morphological and molecular data in a phylogenetic context.

== Occurrence ==
Iotuba has been reported from the Chengjiang biota, with a possible additional occurrence in the Haiyan Lagerstätte
