= Hellanicus of Lesbos =

5th century BC Greek logographer

Hellanicus
- Born: c. 490 BC; Mytilene
- Died: c. 405 BC (aged c. 85); Perperene
- Notable work: Phoronis

Hellanicus (or Hellanikos) of Lesbos (Greek: Ἑλλάνικος ὁ Λέσβιος, Hellánikos ho Lésbios), also called Hellanicus of Mytilene (Greek: Ἑλλάνικος ὁ Μυτιληναῖος, Hellánikos ho Mutilēnaîos; c. 490 – c. 405 BC), was an ancient Greek logographer who flourished during the latter half of the 5th century BC.

== Biography ==
Hellanicus was born in Mytilene on the isle of Lesbos in 490 BC and is reputed to have lived to the age of 85. According to the Suda, he lived for some time at the court of one of the kings of Macedon, and died at Perperene, a city in Aeolis on the plateau of Kozak near Pergamon, opposite Lesbos. He was one of the most prolific of early historians. His many works, though now lost, were very influential. He was cited by a number of other authors, who thereby preserved many fragments of his works, the most recent collection of which is by José J. Caerols Pérez, who includes a biography of Hellanicus.

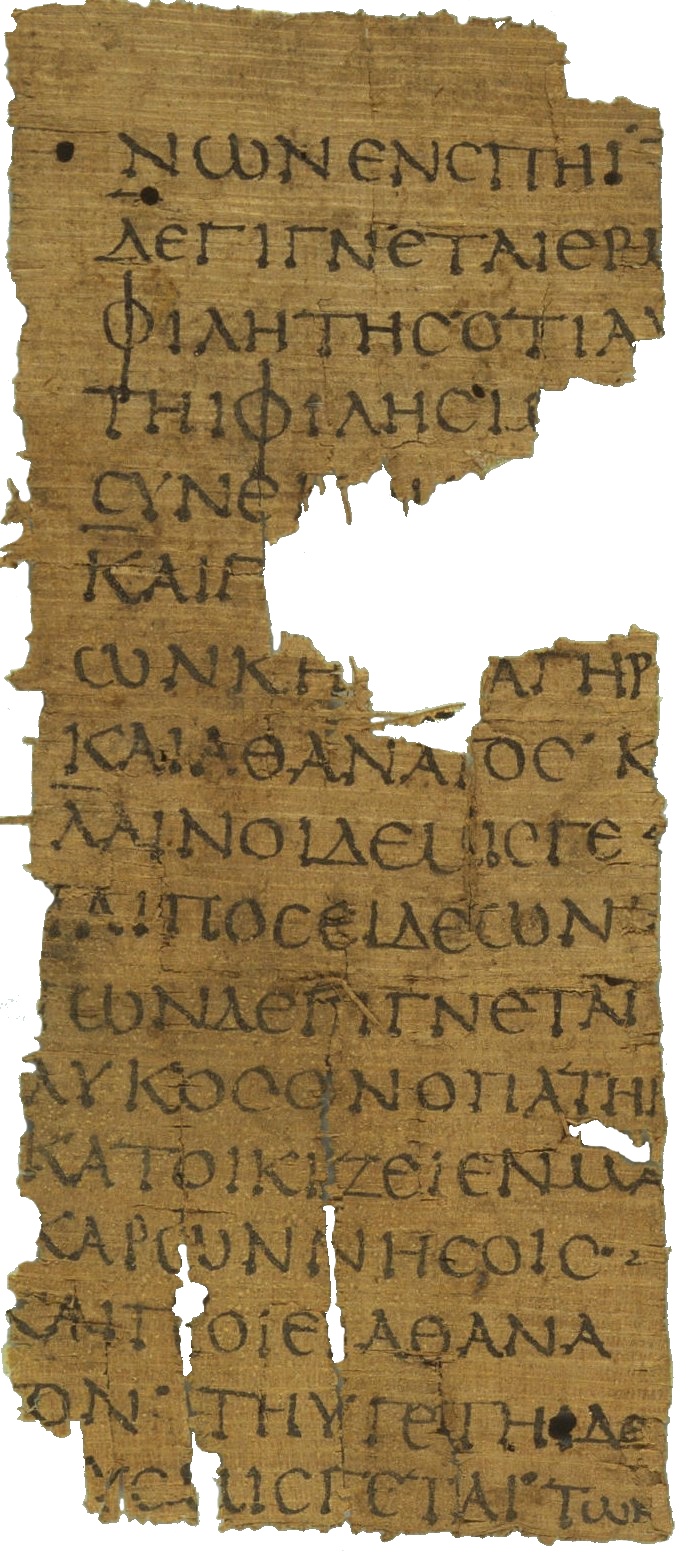
A fragment of Atlantis by Hellanicus (Papyrus Oxyrhynchus 1084, early 2nd century).

Hellanicus authored works of chronology, geography, and history, particularly concerning Attica, in which he made a distinction between what he saw as Greek mythology and history. His influence on the historiography of Athens was considerable, lasting until the time of Eratosthenes (3rd century BC).

He transcended the narrow local limits of the older logographers, and was not content to merely repeat the traditions that had gained general acceptance through the poets. He tried to record the traditions as they were locally current, and availed himself of the few national or priestly registers that presented something like contemporary registration.

He endeavoured to lay the foundations of a scientific chronology, based primarily on the list of the Argive priestesses of Hera, and secondarily on genealogies, lists of magistrates (e.g. the archons at Athens), and Oriental dates, in place of the old reckoning by generations. But his materials were insufficient and he often had to seek recourse to the older methods.

Some thirty works are attributed to him, chronological, historical and episodical. They include:

- The Priestesses of Hera at Argon: a chronological compilation, arranged according to the order of succession of these functionaries
- Carneonikae: a list of the victors in the Carnean games (the chief Spartan musical festival), including notices of literary events.
- Atthis, giving the history of Attica from 683 BC to the end of the Peloponnesian War (404 BC), which is mentioned by Thucydides (i. 97), who says that he treated the events of the years 480 BC to 431 BC briefly and superficially, and with little regard to chronological sequence.
- Phoronis: chiefly genealogical, with short notices of events from the times of Phoroneus, primordial king in Peloponnesus.
- Troica and Persica: histories of Troy and Persia.
- Atlantis (or Atlantias), about the daughter of the Titan Atlas. Some of his text may have come from an epic poem which Carl Robert called Atlantis, a fragment of which may be Oxyrhynchus Papyri 11, 1359.

His work includes the first mention of the legendary founding of Rome by the Trojans; he writes that the city was founded by Aeneas when accompanying Odysseus on his travels through Latium. He also supported the idea that an incoming group of Pelasgians lay behind the origins of the Etruscans. The latter idea, from Phoronis, influenced Dionysius of Halicarnassus, who cites him [I.28] as a source.
