= Phoronis pallida =

Scientific classification
- Domain: Eukaryota
- Kingdom: Animalia
- Phylum: Phoronida
- Family: Phoronidae
- Genus: Phoronis
- Species: P. pallida

Binomial name
- Phoronis pallida (Schneider, 1862)

Species of phoronid

Phoronis pallida is a species of marine horseshoe worm in the phylum Phoronida, and the second smallest species.
