= Phoronis (Hellanicus) =

Lost work by Hellanicus of Lesbos

The Phoronis is a lost work by the fifth-century Greek historian Hellanicus of Lesbos. It takes its title from the local Tirynthian culture hero Phoroneus. It was an account of Argolic tradition, consisting mostly of genealogies, with short accounts of various events included, from the time of Phoroneus, the "father of mortal men", to the "Return of the Heracleidae".
