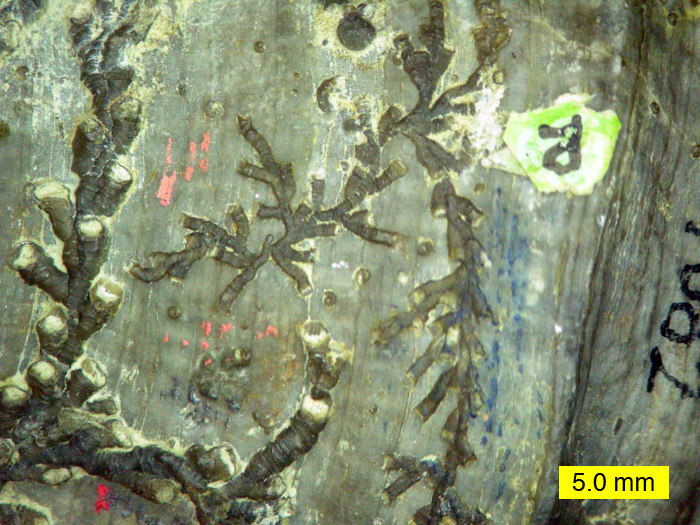
- Branching colonies of hederellids

Scientific classification
- Kingdom: Animalia
- Phylum: Phoronida (?)
- Suborder: †Hederelloidea; Bassler, 1939

Families and genera
- See classification

= Hederellid =

Hederellids/Hederelloids Temporal range: Silurian–Permian

Superfamily of lophotrochs

Hederellids are extinct colonial animals with calcitic tubular branching exoskeletons. They range from the Silurian to the Permian and were most common in the Devonian period. They are more properly known as hederelloids because they were originally defined as a suborder by Bassler, who described about 130 species. Although they have traditionally been considered bryozoans, they are clearly not because of their branching patterns, lack of an astogenetic gradient, skeletal microstructure, and wide range in tube diameters. Work continues on assessing the true affinities of hederelloids, but they appear to be most closely related to phoronids and other lophophorates.

== Classification ==
- Family Hederellidae
  - Genus Diversipora
  - Genus Hederella
- Family Reptariidae
  - Genus Cystoporella
  - Genus Hederopsis
  - Genus Hernodia
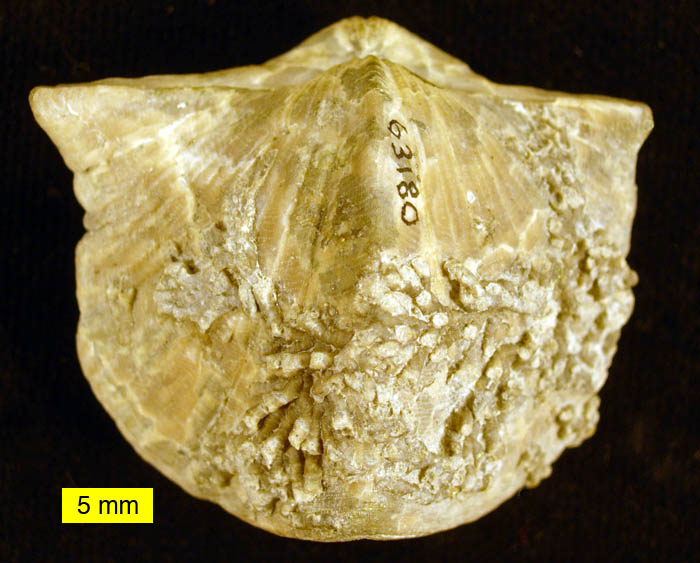
Hederelloids encrusting a brachiopod from the Devonian of Ohio

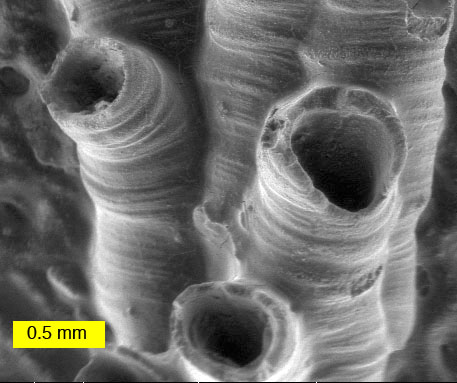
SEM image of a hederelloid from the Devonian of Michigan (largest tube diameter is 0.75 mm)
