= Phoronis psammophila =

Scientific classification
- Kingdom: Animalia
- Phylum: Phoronida
- Family: Phoronidae
- Genus: Phoronis
- Species: P. psammophila

Binomial name
- Phoronis psammophila Cori, 1889

Synonyms
- P. architecta Andrews, 1890; P. sabatieri Roule, 1890

Species of horseshoe worm

Phoronis psammophila is a species of marine horseshoe worm in the phylum Phoronida. It lives in a tube projecting from the sea floor in shallow seas around the world.

== Description ==
Phoronis psammophila constructs and lives in a rigid, chitinous tube about 10 cm long, incorporating sand grains and detritus. The extended worm is up to 19 centimetres long but it can contract down to about one fifth of this length. The body is pinkish and is divided into two sections. The anterior part, the mesosome, has a cavity, the mesocoel, that extends into the tentacles and keeps them rigid by hydrostatic pressure. The mesosome bears the lophophore, a specialist feeding structure which consists of a ring of up to 190 translucent tentacles arranged in a horseshoe-shape encircling the crescent-shaped mouth. The posterior and larger body section is the metasome and contains the metacoel. It is swollen at the base into an ampulla which may provide grip inside the tube. The gut is U-shaped and extends from the mouth to the ampulla before doubling back to the anus which is situated just below the mouth. The gonads are located in the metacoel. There are two blood vessels running along the ventral and dorsal sides of the body with capillaries in the tentacles. These are made easily visible by the haemoglobin in the red blood cells. There is a single nerve fibre on the left side of the body.

== Distribution and habitat ==
The distribution is cosmopolitan and the type locality is Messina in Italy. P. psammophila is found in the intertidal zone and at depths down to 70 metres. It favours a substrate of fine sand with a moderate silt content and sometimes occurs at densities of up to 20,000 individuals per square metre.

== Biology ==
Phoronis psammophila is a filter feeder and the lophophore is used in both feeding and respiration. It is orientated so that it faces the prevailing water current. Cilia on the inside of the tentacles create a feeding current and draw in particles. The diet consists of diatoms, microalgae, flagellates, invertebrate larvae and detritus and these are caught and transported to the mouth by the cilia.

Phoronis psammophila is dioecious with individuals being male or female. The gametes are released into the metacoel to mature and for storage. Sperm pass out into the water column through nephridiopores, which are also used for the excretion of waste products. The sperm are formed into little balls called spermatophores by specialist organs. When dispersed, they become amoeboid and make their way through the body wall of an adult worm before fertilising eggs in the metacoel. The resulting zygotes make their way out through the nephridiopores and become planktonic larvae. They may be brooded as an egg mass in the lophophoral cavity for a period.

The larva is known as an actinotroch and was thought for a long time to be an adult organism in its own right and given the generic name Actinotrocha sabatieri. The actinotroch larva is transparent and has a ring of ciliated tentacles just behind the mouth, a straight gut and an anus at the posterior end. Metamorphosis is very rapid and in the course of half an hour, new tentacles appear and the body is transformed. The metasomal sac protrudes from the ventral surface and turns inside out, with the posterior end of the worm uniting with the anterior end while the previous ventral region becomes the new posterior end. In the process, the gut is bent double into the U-shape typical of this phylum.

Asexual reproduction also takes place, usually by transverse fission, and may result in groups of individuals clustered in close proximity to each other, sometimes tangled together.
