= Helen Lucia Mary Pixell =

British zoologist

- Born: 25 July 1878; Frampton Cotterell, Gloucestershire, England
- Died: 29 May 1957 (age 79); Oxford, England
- Burial place: Holywell, City of Oxford, Oxfordshire, England
- Other names: Helen L M Pixell-Goodrich, Helen Pixell-Goodrich, Helen Goodrich
- Education: BSc in Zoology, Bedford College, London (1901); DSc (1915)
- Occupations: Protozoologist, Marine biologist
- Employer(s): Bedford College, University of London; University of Oxford
- Known for: Research on Protozoa and marine fauna
- Notable work: Two New Species of the Phoronidea from Vancouver Island (1912)
- Spouse: Edwin Stephen Goodrich (married 1913)
- Awards: Reid Fellow (1910-1913), Beit Memorial Fellowship (1912)

Helen Lucia Mary Pixell Goodrich (25 July 1878 – 29 May 1957) was a British zoologist and researcher notable for her studies on marine fauna and protozoa.

== Early life ==
Helen Lucia Mary Pixell was born on 25 July 1878 to the Reverend Charles Henry Vincent Pixell and Edith Mary Wilson.

== Education and career ==
Pixell graduated with a BSc in zoology from Bedford College, London in 1901. In 1904 she became a Junior Demonstrator at Bedford College.

Pixell received a Reid Fellowship in 1910 that funded her until 1913 and enable her to conduct research marine fauna in the Georgian Strait.

In 1911, she was provided with quarters by the Canadian Government at Departure Bay, where she dredged British Columbian waters off Vancouver Island. The material she collected was presented to the British Natural History Museum for ecological examination.

Pixell received a Beit Memorial Fellowships for Medical Research in 1913.

In 1915, she was awarded a DSc for her research; in 1942 she received her M.A.

== Research ==
While she worked at Bedford College at the University of London, she wrote a chapter on polychaetes in the volume describing the scientific results of the Scottish National Antarctic Expedition on the S.Y. Scotia from 1902 to 1904.

She researched oral hygiene and the role of mouthwash as an antiseptic, and published details on making mouthwash.

Her research on Entamoeba histolytica was reviewed in a 1916 volume of Nature. Her 1918 book, Canning and Bottling, was briefly reviewed in the Saturday Review of Politics, Literature, Science and Art.

While at Oxford, she worked on the science of fruit preservation and bee diseases. In a 1997 book on science conducted at Oxford, Jack Morrell described Helen as "a dominating figure in the laboratory compared with her husband".

She also contributed to the ninth edition of Bolles Lee's Microtomist's vade-mecum and her contribution was noted in a 1929 review of the book.

== Awards and honors ==
In 1946, the P.L. Misra named a type of protist in the Gregarinasina class, Grebneckiella pixellae, in honor of Pixell's work on Grebneckiella.

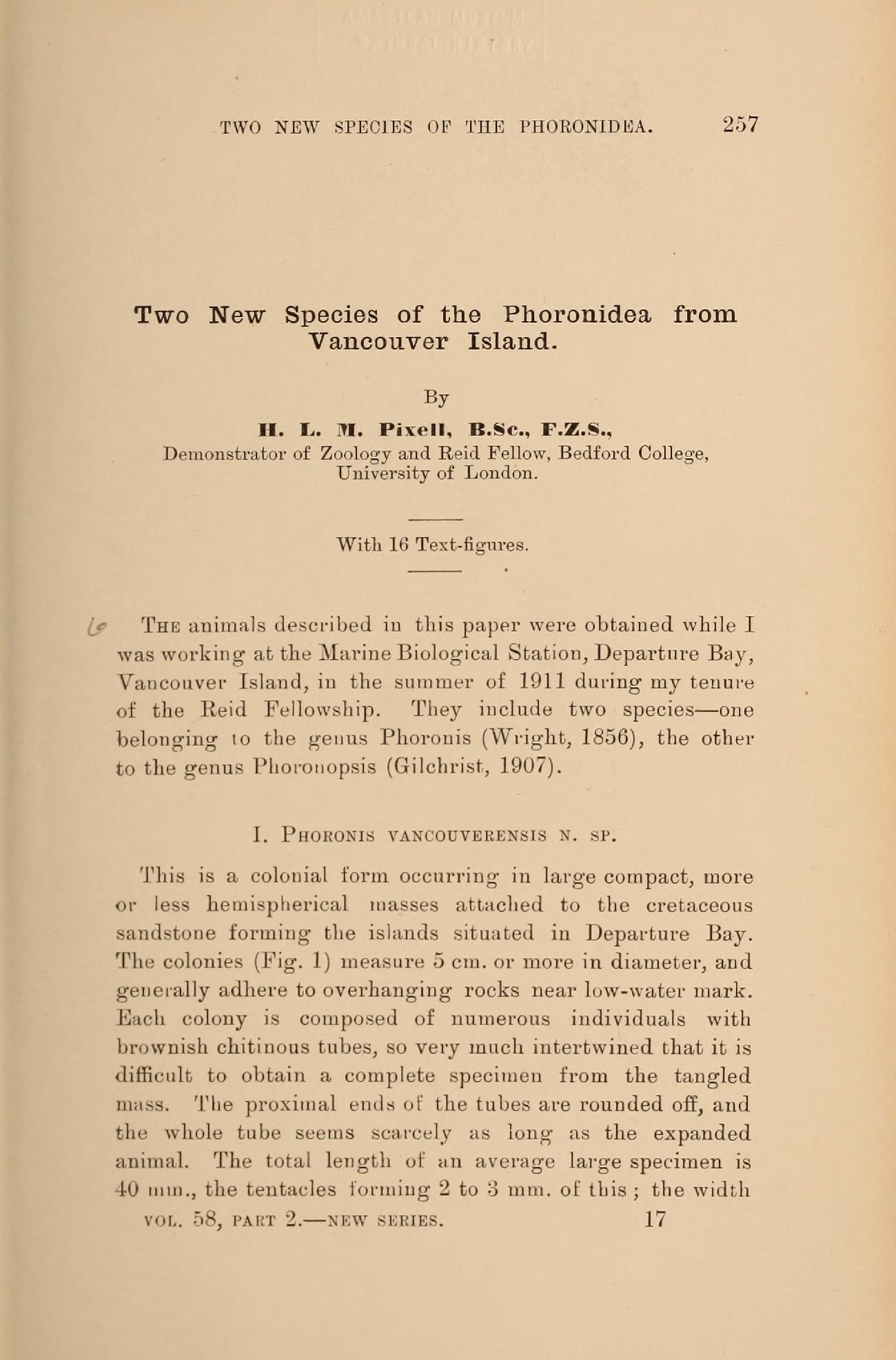
First page from Pixell, H. L. M. (1912). Memoirs: Two New Species of the Phoronidea from Vancouver Island. Quarterly Journal of Microscopical Science, 58(230), 257-284.

== Personal life ==
Pixell married Edwin Stephen Goodrich in 1913; he was a comparative vertebrate morphologist. While they shared similar professional interests, they kept their scientific work largely separate.

She died in 1957.

== Selected publications ==
- Pixell, H. L. M. (1912-12-01). "Memoirs: Two New Species of the Phoronidea from Vancouver Island". Quarterly Journal of Microscopical Science. 58 (230): 257–284.
- Pixell, Helen L. M. (1912). "Polychæa from the Pacific Coast of North America.— Part I. SERPULTIDE. with a Revised Table of Classification of the Gennus Spirorbis". Proceedings of the Zoological Society of London. 82 (4): 784–805. doi:10.1111/j.1469-7998.1912.tb07558.x. ISSN 0370-2774.
- Pixell, Helen L. M. (1913). "Notes on Toxoplasma gondii". Proceedings of the Royal Society of London. Series B, Containing Papers of a Biological Character. 87 (592): 67–77. doi:10.1098/rspb.1913.0059.
- Pixell-Goodrich, Helen L. M. (1914-04-01). "Memoirs: The Sporogony and Systematic Position of the Aggregatidæ". Quarterly Journal of Microscopical Science. 60 (237): 159–173.
- Pixell-Goodrich, Helen L. M. (1915-05-01). "Memoirs: On the Life-History of the Sporozoa of Spatangoids, with Observation on some Allied Forms". Quarterly Journal of Microscopical Science. 61 (241): 81–104.
- Pixell-Goodrich, Helen L. M. (1916-03-01). "Memoirs: The Gregarines of Glycera Siphonostoma". Quarterly Journal of Microscopical Science. 61 (243): 205–216.
- Goodrich, Helen Pixell (1917-04-14). "Mouth-Washes in Health and Disease". Br Med J. 1 (2937): 473–475. doi:10.1136/bmj.1.2937.473. ISSN 0007-1447. PMC 2348080. PMID 20768541.
- Goodrich, Helen Pixell (1917-05-19). "Glycerine and Antiseptics". Br Med J. 1 (2942): 647–648. doi:10.1136/bmj.1.2942.647. ISSN 0007-1447. PMC 2348463. PMID 20768592.
- Goodrich, Helen Pixell (1918). Canning and bottling : with notes on other simple methods of preserving fruit and vegetables. OCLC 20672729.
- Goodrich, Helen Pixell (1920). Determination of age in honey-bees. [London]: [s.n.] doi:10.5962/bhl.title.56684.
- Pixell-Goodrich, Helen L. M. (1920-01-01). "Memoirs: Determination of Age in Honey-Bees". Quarterly Journal of Microscopical Science. 64 (254): 191–205.
- Goodrich, Edwin S.; Goodrich, H. L. M. Pixell (1920-12-01). "Memoirs: Gonospora minchinii, n. sp., a Gregarine inhabiting the egg of Arenicola". Quarterly Journal of Microscopical Science. 65 (257): 157–162.
- Goodrich, Helen Pixell; Way, Geoffrey L. (1940-05-11). "Prevention of Throat Infection". Br Med J. 1 (4140): 768–769. doi:10.1136/bmj.1.4140.768. ISSN 0007-1447. PMC 2177442. PMID 20783092.
- Goodrich, Helen Pixell (1956). "Crayfish epidemics". Parasitology. 46 (3–4): 480–483. doi:10.1017/S0031182000026615. ISSN 1469-8161. PMID 13378890.
