= Edwin Stephen Goodrich =

English zoologist (1868–1946)

Edwin Stephen Goodrich FRS (Weston-super-Mare, 21 June 1868 – Oxford, 6 January 1946), was an English zoologist, specialising in comparative anatomy, embryology, palaeontology, and evolution. He held the Linacre Chair of Zoology in the University of Oxford from 1921 to 1946. He served as editor of the Quarterly Journal of Microscopical Science from 1920 until his death.

== Life ==
Goodrich's father died when he was only two weeks old, and his mother took her children to live with her mother at Pau, France, where he attended the local English school and a French lycée. In 1888 he entered the Slade School of Art at University College London; there he met E. Ray Lankester, who interested him in zoology.

On coming to Oxford from London, Goodrich entered Merton College, Oxford as an undergraduate in 1891 and, while acting as assistant to Lankester, read for the final honour school in Zoology; he was awarded the Rolleston Memorial Prize in 1894 and graduated with first-class honours the following year.

In 1913 Goodrich married Helen Pixell, a distinguished protozoologist, who helped greatly with his work. His artistic training always stood him in good stead. He drew diagrams of beauty and clarity whilst lecturing (students used to photograph the blackboard before it was erased), and in his books and papers. He also exhibited his watercolor landscapes in London. Goodrich was elected Fellow of the Royal Society in 1905 and received its Royal Medal in 1936. He was honorary member of the New York Academy of Science and of many other academies, and awarded many honorary doctorates. In 1945 Lev Berg of Leningrad sent a message through Julian Huxley: "Please tell [Goodrich] that... we all regard ourselves as his pupils." A small, dapper, thin man with a dry sense of humor, he always complained that, when travelling by air, he was not weighed with his luggage, since his own weight was only half that of an average passenger.

== Career ==
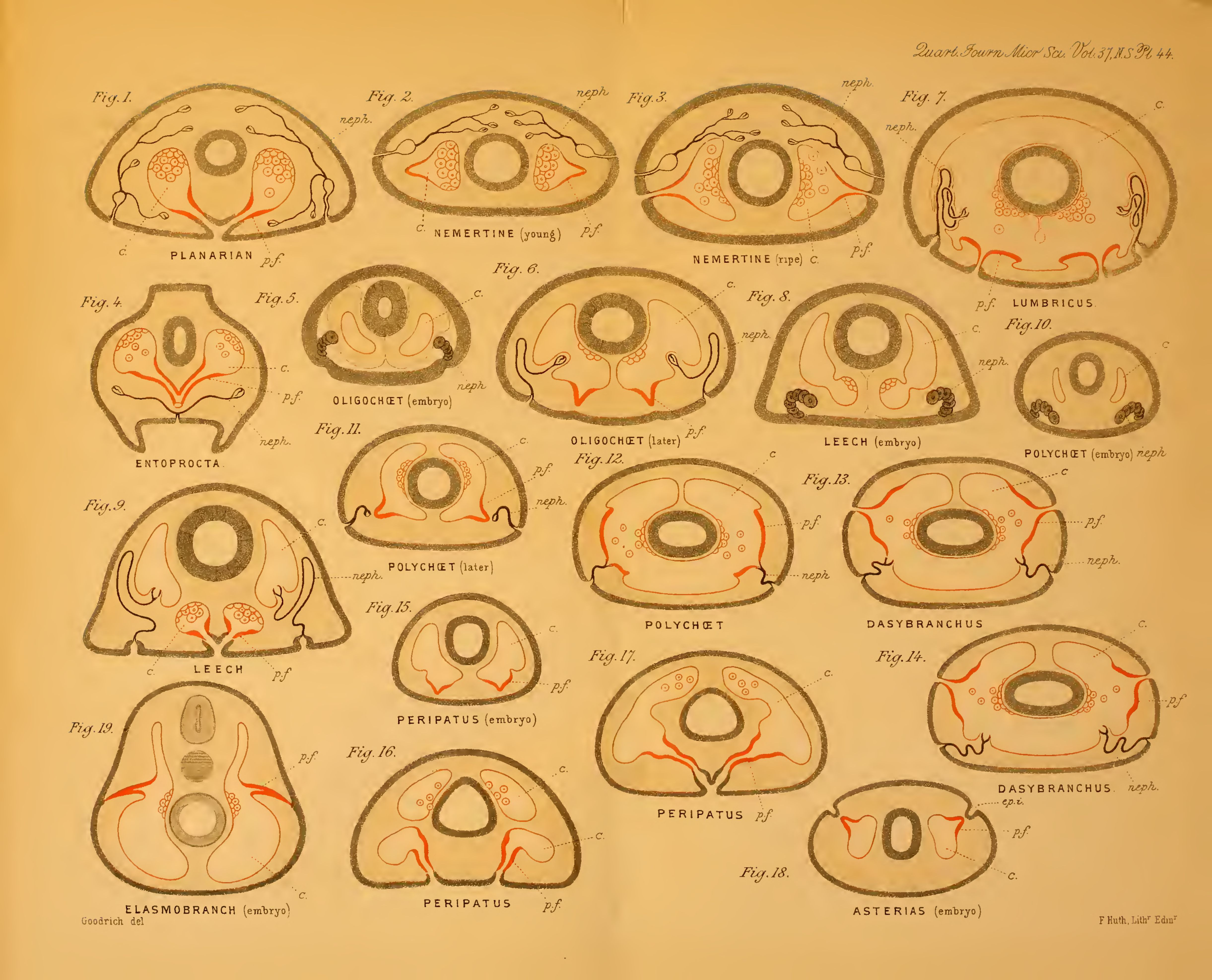
Illustrations of the Coelom, Genital Ducts, and Nephridia of various species

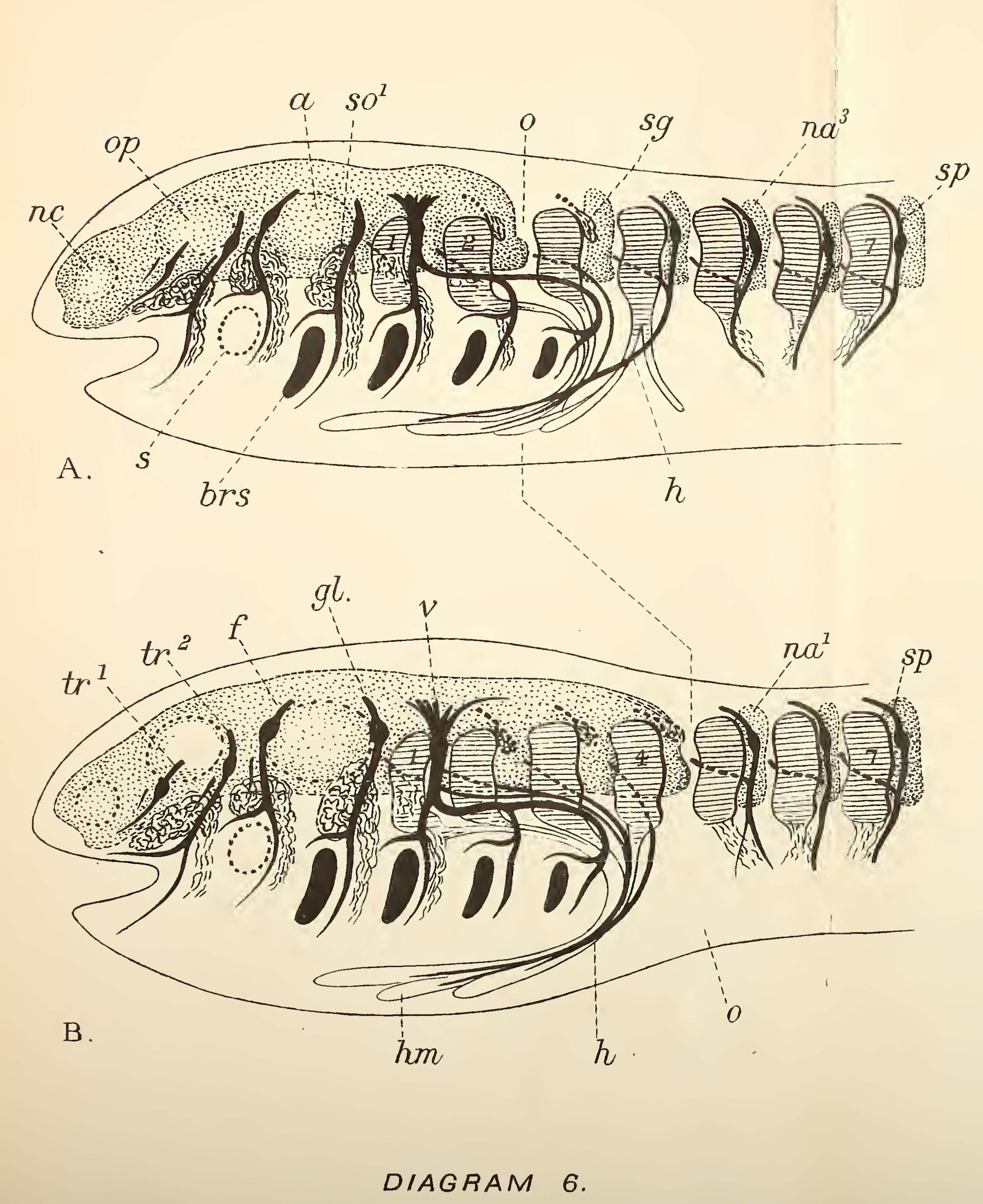
The head-region of an Amphibian A, and an Amniote (mammal) B, showing segmentation

When Lankester became Linacre Professor of Comparative Anatomy at Merton College, he made Goodrich his assistant in 1892; this marked the start of the researches which during half a century made Goodrich the greatest comparative anatomist of his day. In 1921 Goodrich was appointed to his mentor's old post, which he held until 1945.

From the start of his researches, many of which were devoted to marine organisms, Goodrich made himself acquainted at first hand with the marine fauna of Plymouth, Roscoff, Banyuls, Naples, Helgoland, Bermuda, Madeira, and the Canary Islands. He also travelled extensively in Europe, the United States, North Africa, India, Ceylon, Malaya, and Java. He worked out the significance of the tubes connecting the centres of the bodies of animals with the outside. There are nephridia, developed from the outer layer inward and serving the function of excretion. Quite different from them are coelomoducts, developed from the middle layer outward, serving to release the germ cells. These two sets of tubes may look similar, when each opens into the body cavity through a funnel surrounded by cilia which create a current of fluid. In some groups the nephridia may disappear (as in vertebrates, where the nephridia may have been converted into the thymus gland), and the coelomoducts then take on the additional function of excretion. This is why man has a genitourinary system. Before Goodrich's analysis, the whole subject was in chaos.

Goodrich established that a motor nerve remains linked to its corresponding segmental muscle, however much it may have become displaced or obscured in development. He showed that organs can be homologous without arising from the same segments of the body. For example, the fins and limbs of vertebrates; and the occipital arch (the back of the skull), which varies in vertebrates from the fifth to the ninth segment.

He distinguished between the scale structures of fishes, living and fossil, by which they are classified and recognised. This is important because different strata may identified by fossil fish scales. Goodrich's attention was always focused on evolution, to which he made notable contributions, firmly adhering to Darwin's theory of natural selection.

He was elected a Fellow of the Royal Society in May 1905.

On his seventieth birthday, in 1938, his colleagues and pupils published a festschrift edited by Gavin de Beer: Evolution: essays on aspects of evolutionary biology.

== Selected works ==
- Goodrich E.S. 1909. The Vertebrata Craniata (Cyclostomes and Fishes). Volume IX of Lankester E. Ray (ed) Treatise on Zoology, London.
- Goodrich, Edwin S. 1924. Living organisms: an account of their origin and evolution. Oxford University Press.
- Goodrich E.S. 1930. Studies on the structure and development of Vertebrates. Macmillan, London. xxx+837p, 754 figures. One of the great works of vertebrate comparative anatomy.
- Goodrich E.S. 1895. On the coelom, genital ducts, and nephridia. Q.J.M.S. 37, 477–510.
- Goodrich E.S. 1913. Metameric segmentation and homology, Q.J.M.S. 59, 227–248.
- Goodrich E.S. 1927. The problem of the sympathetic nervous system from the morphological point of view. Proceedings of the Anatomical Society of Great Britain and Ireland, Journal of Anatomy 61, p499.
- Goodrich E.S. 1934. The early development of the nephridia in Amphioxus, Introduction and part I: Hatschek's Nephridium. Q.J.M.S. 76, 499–510.
- Goodrich E.S. 1934. 'The early development of the nephridia in Amphioxus, part II: The paired nephridia. Q.J.M.S. 76, 655–674.
- Goodrich E.S. 1945. The study of nephridia and genital ducts since 1895. Q.J.M.S. 86, 113–392.
