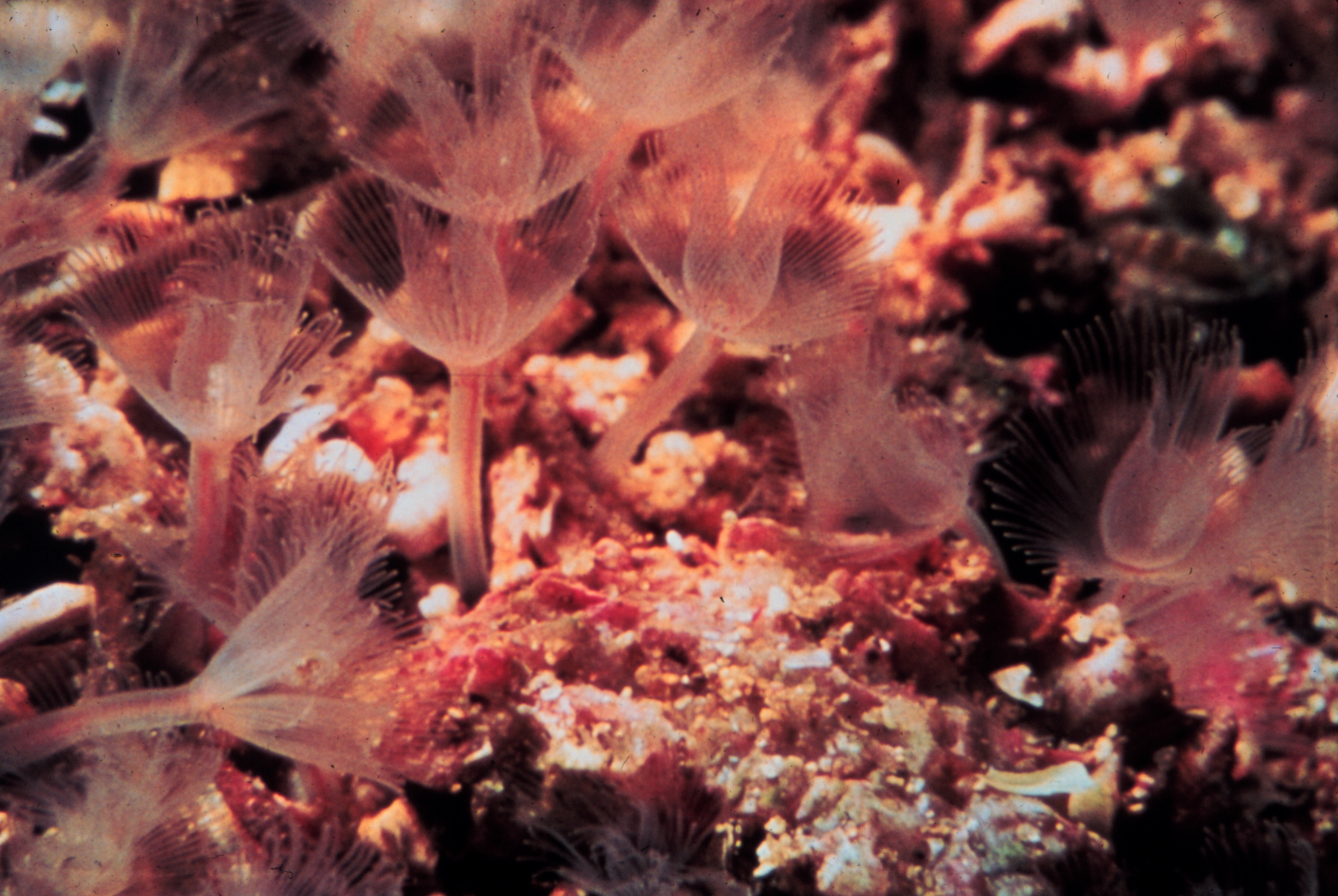
- Phoronis sp.
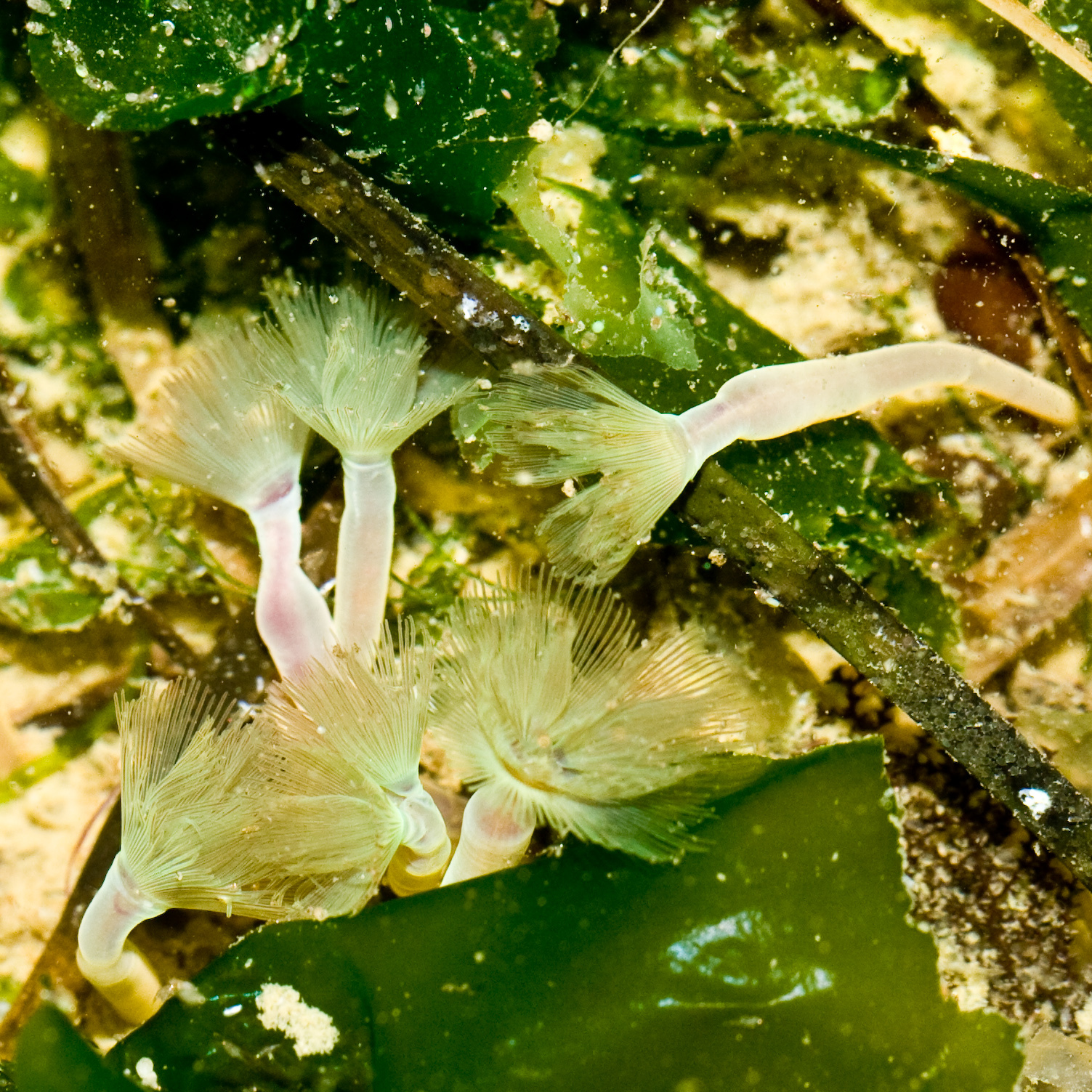
- Phoronopsis harmeri

Scientific classification
- Kingdom: Animalia
- Subkingdom: Eumetazoa
- Clade: ParaHoxozoa
- Clade: Bilateria
- Clade: Nephrozoa
- Clade: Protostomia
- Clade: Spiralia
- Superphylum: Lophotrochozoa
- Clade: Lophophorata
- Clade: Brachiozoa
- Phylum: Phoronida; Hatschek, 1888

Genera
- Phoronis Wright, 1856; Phoronopsis Gilchrist, 1907; †Cytosporella?; †Hederellids?

= Phoronid =

Phoronids Temporal range: Recent

Phylum of marine animals

Phoronids (taxonomic name Phoronida, sometimes called horseshoe worms) are a small phylum of marine animals that filter-feed with a lophophore (a "crown" of tentacles), and build upright tubes of chitin to support and protect their soft bodies. They live in most of the oceans and seas, including the Arctic Ocean but excluding the Antarctic Ocean, and between the intertidal zone and about 400 meters down. Most adult phoronids are 2 cm long and about 1.5 mm wide, although the largest are 50 cm long.

The name of the group comes from its type genus: Phoronis.

== Overview ==
The bottom end of the body is an ampulla (a flask-like swelling), which anchors the animal in the tube and enables it to retract its body very quickly when threatened. When the lophophore is extended at the top of the body, cilia (little hairs) on the sides of the tentacles draw food particles to the mouth, which is inside and slightly to one side of the base of the lophophore. Unwanted material can be excluded by closing a lid above the mouth or be rejected by the tentacles, whose cilia can switch into reverse. The food then moves down to the stomach, which is in the ampulla. Solid wastes are moved up the intestine and out through the anus, which is outside and slightly below the lophophore.

A blood vessel leads up the middle of the body from the stomach to a circular vessel at the base of the lophophore, and from there a single blind vessel runs up each tentacle. A pair of blood vessels near the body wall lead downward from the lophophore ring to the stomach and also to blind branches throughout the body. There is no heart, but the major vessels can contract in waves to move the blood. Phoronids do not ventilate their trunks with oxygenated water, but rely on respiration through the lophophore. The blood contains hemoglobin, which is unusual in such small animals and seems to be an adaptation to anoxic and hypoxic environments. The blood of Phoronis architecta carries twice as much oxygen as a human of the same weight. Two metanephridia filter the body fluid, returning any useful products and dumping the remaining soluble wastes through a pair of pores beside the anus.

One species builds colonies by budding or by splitting into top and bottom sections, and all phoronids reproduce sexually from spring to autumn. The eggs of most species form free-swimming actinotroch larvae, which feed on plankton. An actinotroch settles to the seabed after about 20 days and then undergoes a radical change in 30 minutes: the larval tentacles are replaced by the adult lophophore; the anus moves from the bottom to just outside the lophophore; and this changes the gut from upright to a U-bend, with the stomach at the bottom of the body. One species forms a "slug-like" larva, and the larvae of a few species are not known. Phoronids live for about one year.

Some species live separately, in vertical tubes embedded in soft sediment, while others form tangled masses buried in or encrusting rocks and shells. Species able to bore into materials like limestone and dead corals do so by chemical secretions. In some habitats populations of phoronids reach tens of thousands of individuals per square meter. The actinotroch larvae are familiar among plankton, and sometimes account for a significant proportion of the zooplankton biomass. Predators include fish, gastropods (snails), and nematodes (tiny roundworms). One phoronid species is unpalatable to many epibenthic predators. Various parasites infest phoronids' body cavities, digestive tract and tentacles. It is unknown whether phoronids have any significance for humans. The International Union for Conservation of Nature (IUCN) has not listed any phoronid species as endangered.

As of 2010 there are no indisputable body fossils of phoronids. There is good evidence that phoronids created trace fossils found in the Silurian, Devonian, Permian, Jurassic and Cretaceous periods, and possibly in the Ordovician and Triassic. Phoronids, brachiopods and bryozoans (ectoprocts) have collectively been called lophophorates, because all use lophophores to feed. From about the 1940s to the 1990s, family trees based on embryological and morphological features placed lophophorates among or as a sister group to the deuterostomes, a super-phylum which includes chordates and echinoderms. While a minority adhere to this view, most researchers now regard phoronids as members of the protostome super-phylum Lophotrochozoa. Although analysts using molecular phylogeny are confident that members of Lophotrochozoa are more closely related to each other than of non-members, the relationships between members are mostly unclear. Some analyses regard phoronids and brachiopods as sister-groups, while others place phoronids as a sub-group within brachiopoda.

== Comparison of similar phyla ==
Summary of distinguishing features
Feature	Phoronids	Brachiopods	Bryozoans	Entoprocts
Tentacles hollow	Yes	Yes	Yes	No
Protection and support	Chitin tube, sometimes with agglutinated particles	Shell with two valves	Various, e.g. chitin covering, mineralized skeletons, avicularia, or chemical defenses	None
Feeding flow	Top to bottom	In through sides of shell, out through front	Top to bottom	Bottom to top
Anus	Outside ring of tentacles	In the mantle, or none and solid waste is ejected out of the mouth	Outside ring of tentacles	Inside ring of tentacles
Colonial	Only Phoronis ovalis	No	All but Monobryozoon and Aethozoidae	All but Loxosomatidae (other than Loxosomella coronata and Emschermannia ramificata)
Coelom	Yes	Yes	Yes	No

== Description ==
=== Body structure ===
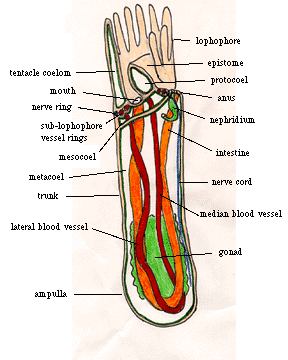
Anatomy of an adult phoronid

Most adult phoronids are 2 to 20 cm long and about 1.5 mm wide, although the largest are 50 cm long. Their skins have no cuticle but secrete rigid tubes of chitin, similar to the material used in arthropods' exoskeletons, and sometimes reinforced with sediment particles and other debris. Most species' tubes are erect, but those of Phoronis vancouverensis are horizontal and tangled. Phoronids can move within their tubes but never leave them. The bottom end of the body is an ampulla (a flask-like swelling in a tube-like structure), which anchors the animal in the tube and enables it to retract its body when threatened, reducing the body to 20 percent of its maximum length. Longitudinal muscles retract the body very quickly, while circular muscles slowly extend the body by compressing the internal fluid.

For feeding and respiration each phoronid has at the top end a lophophore, a "crown" of tentacles with which the animal filter-feeds. In small species the "crown" is a simple circle, in medium-size species it is bent into the shape of a horseshoe with tentacles on the outer and inner sides, and in the largest species the ends of the horseshoe wind into complex spirals. These more elaborate shapes increase the area available for feeding and respiration. The tentacles are hollow, held upright by fluid pressure, and can be moved individually by muscles.

The mouth is inside the base of the crown of tentacles but to one side. The gut runs from the mouth to one side of the stomach, in the bottom of the ampulla. The intestine runs from the stomach, up the other side of the body, and exits at the anus, outside and a little below the crown of tentacles. The gut and intestine are both supported by two mesenteries (partitions that run the length of the body) connected to the body wall, and another mesentery connects the gut to the intestine.

The body is divided into coeloms, compartments lined with mesothelium. The main body cavity, under the crown of tentacles, is called the metacoelom, and the tentacles and their base share the mesocoelom. Above the mouth is the epistome, a hollow lid which can close the mouth. The cavity in the epistome is sometimes called the protocoelom, although other authors disagree that it is a coelom and Ruppert, Fox and Barnes think it is built by a different process.

The tube comprises a three-layered organic inner cylinder, and an agglutinated external layer.

=== Feeding, circulation and excretion ===
When the lophophore is extended, cilia (little hairs) on the sides of the tentacles draw water down between the tentacles and out at the base of the lophophore. Shorter cilia on the inner sides of the tentacles flick food particles into a groove in a circle under and just inside the tentacles, and cilia in the groove push the particles into the mouth. Phoronids direct their lophophores into the water current, and quickly reorient to maximize the food-catching area when currents change. Their diet includes algae, diatoms, flagellates, peridinians, small invertebrate larvae, and detritus. Unwanted material can be excluded by closing the epistome (lid above the mouth) or be rejected by the tentacles, whose cilia can switch into reverse. The gut uses cilia and muscles to move food towards the stomach and secretes enzymes that digest some of the food, but the stomach digests the majority of the food. Phoronids also absorb amino acids (the building blocks of proteins) through their skins, mainly in summer. Solid wastes are moved up the intestine and out through the anus, which is outside and slightly below the lophophore.

A blood vessel starts from the peritoneum (the membrane that loosely encloses the stomach), with blind capillaries supplying the stomach. The blood vessel leads up the middle of the body to a circular vessel at the base of the lophophore, and from there a single blind vessel runs up each tentacle. A pair of blood vessels near the body wall lead downward from the lophophore ring, and in most species these are combined into one a little below the lophophore ring. The downward vessel(s) leads back to the peritoneum, and also to blind branches throughout the body. There is no heart, but muscles in the major vessels contract in waves to move the blood. Unlike many animals that live in tubes, phoronids do not ventilate their trunks with oxygenated water, but rely on respiration by the lophophore, which extends above hypoxic sediments. The blood has hemocytes containing hemoglobin, which unusual in such small animals and seems to be an adaptation to anoxic and hypoxic environments. The blood of Phoronis architecta carries as much oxygen per cm^{3} as that of most vertebrates; the blood's volume in cm^{3} per gm of body weight is twice that of a human.

Podocytes on the walls of the blood vessels perform first-stage filtration of soluble wastes into the main coelom's fluid. Two metanephridia, each with a funnel-like intake, filter the fluid a second time, returning any useful products to the coelom and dumping the remaining wastes through a pair of nephridiopores beside the anus.

=== Nervous system and movement ===
There is a nervous center between the mouth and anus, and a nerve ring at the base of the lophophore. The ring supplies nerves to the tentacles and, just under the skin, to the body-wall muscles. Phoronis ovalis has two nerve trunks under the skin, whereas other species have one. The trunk(s) have giant axons (nerves that transmit signals very fast) which co-ordinate the retraction of the body when danger threatens.

Except for retracting the body into the tube, phoronids have limited and slow movement: partial emerging from the tube; bending the body when extended; and the lophophore's flicking of food into the mouth.

=== Reproduction and lifecycle ===
Only the smallest species of horseshoe worms, Phoronis ovalis, naturally builds colonies by budding or by splitting into top and bottom sections which then grow into full bodies. In experiments, other species have split successfully, but only when both parts have enough gonadal (reproductive) tissue. All phoronids breed sexually from spring to autumn. Some species are hermaphroditic (have both male and female reproductive organs) but cross-fertilize (fertilize the eggs of other members), while others are dioecious (have separate sexes). The gametes (sperms and ova) are produced in the swollen gonads, around the stomach. The gametes swim through the metacoelom to the metanephridia. Sperm exit by the nephridiopores and some are captured by the lophophores of individuals of the same species. Species that lay small fertilized eggs release them into the water as plankton, while species with larger eggs brood them either in the body's tube or stuck in the center of the lophophore by adhesive. The brooded eggs are released to feed on plankton when they develop into larvae.

Development of the eggs is a mixture of deuterostome and protostome characteristics. Early divisions of the egg are holoblastic (the cells divide completely) and radial (they gradually form a stack of circles). The process is regulative (the fate of each cell depends on interaction with other cells, not on a rigid program in each cell), and experiments that divided early embryos produced complete larvae. Mesoderm is formed from mesenchyme originating from the archenteron. The coelom is formed by schizocoely, and the blastopore (a dent in the embryo) becomes the mouth.

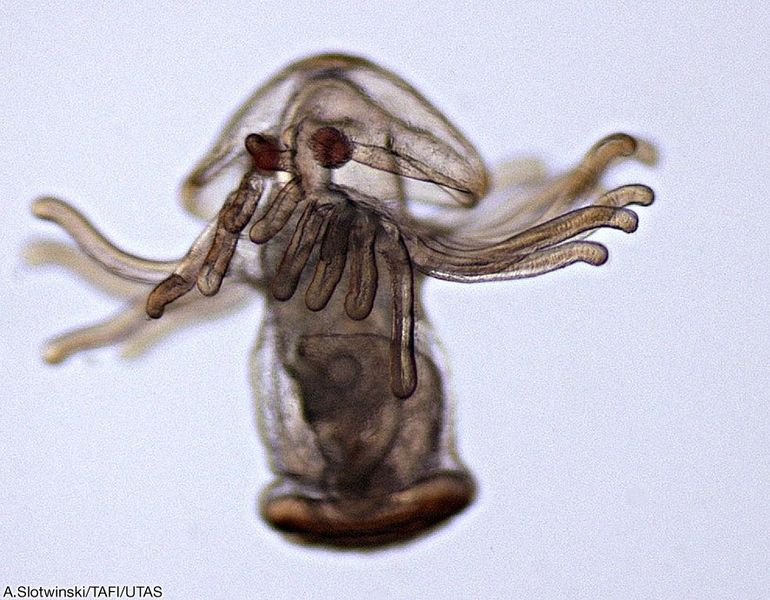
Photo of an actinotroch larva

The slug-like larva of Phoronis ovalis, the only known species with a lecithotrophic (non-feeding) larvae, lack tentacles and swims for about 4 days, creeps on the seabed for 3 to 4 days, then bores into a carbonate floor. Nothing is known about three species. The remaining species develop free-swimming actinotroch larvae, which feed on plankton. The actinotroch is an upright cylinder with the anus at the bottom and fringed with cilia. At the top is a lobe or hood, under which are: a ganglion, connected to a patch of cilia outside the apex of the hood; a pair of protonephridia (smaller and simpler than the metanephridia in the adult); the mouth; and feeding tentacles that encircle the mouth. After swimming for about 20 days, the actinotroch settles on the seabed and undergoes a catastrophic metamorphosis (radical change) in 30 minutes: the hood and larval tentacles are absorbed and the juvenile body forms from the larva's metasomal sack. The adult lophophore is created around the mouth, and by growing a ventral side that is extremely long compared to the dorsal side, the gut develops a U-bend so that the anus is just under and outside the lophophore. Finally the adult phoronid builds a tube.

Phoronids live for about one year.

== Ecology ==
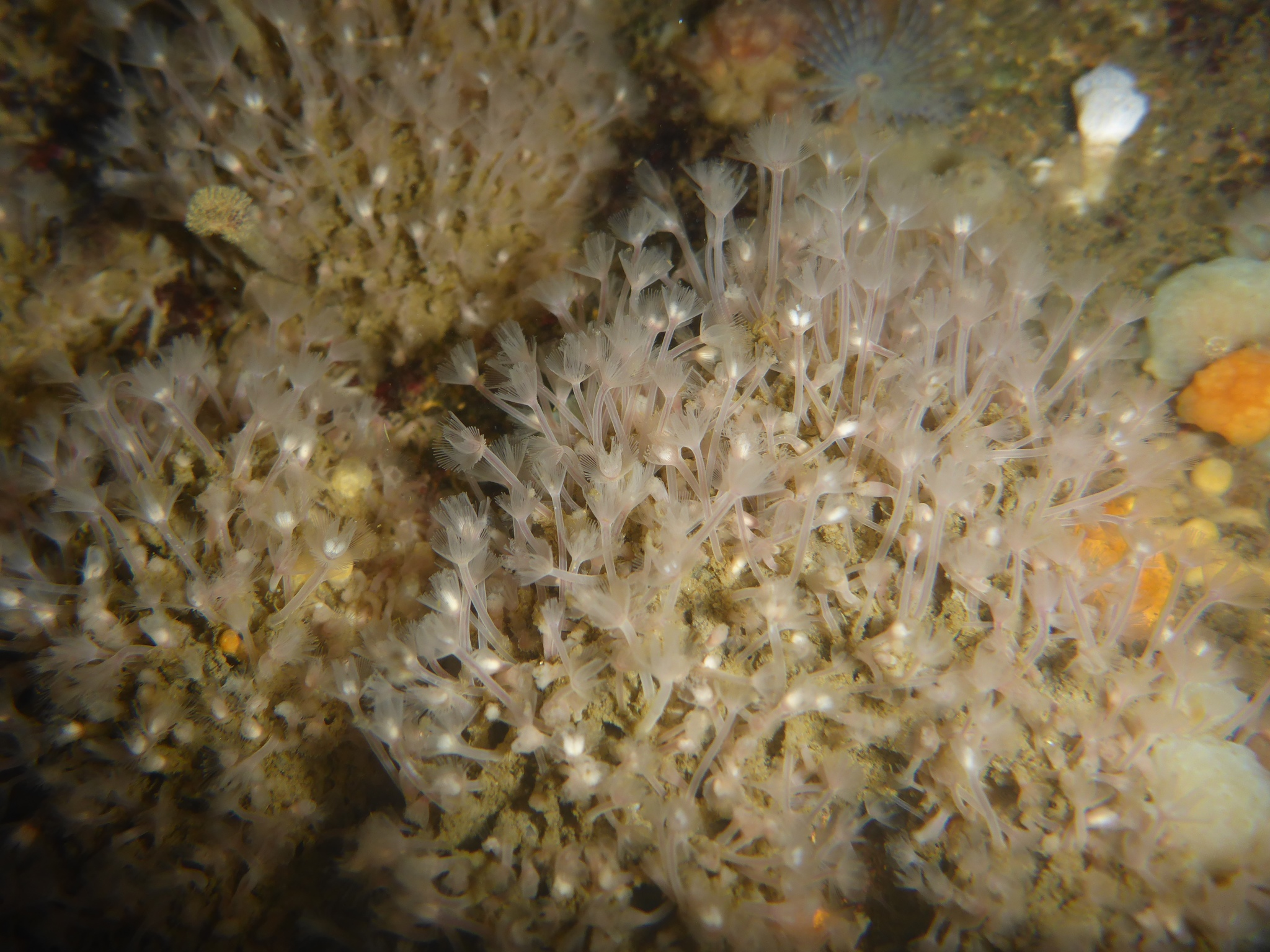
A dense colony of phoronids (Phoronis ijimai)

Phoronids live in all the oceans and seas including the Arctic and excepting the Antarctic Ocean, and appear between the intertidal zone and about 400 meters down. Some occur separately, in vertical tubes embedded in soft sediment such as sand, mud, or fine gravel. Others form tangled masses of many individuals buried in or encrusting rocks and shells. In some habitats populations of phoronids reach tens of thousand of individuals per square meter. The actinotroch larvae are familiar among plankton, and sometimes account for a significant proportion of the zooplankton biomass.

Phoronis australis bores into the wall of the tube of a cerianthid anemone, Ceriantheomorphe brasiliensis, and uses this as a foundation for building its own tube. One cerianthid can house up to 100 phoronids. In this unequal relationship, the anemone experiences no significant benefits nor harm, while the phoronid benefits from: a foundation for its tube; food (both animals are filter-feeders); and protection, as the cerianthid withdraws into its tube when danger threatens, and this alerts the phoronid to retract into its own tube.

Although predators of phoronids are not well known, they include fish, gastropods (snails), and nematodes (tiny roundworms). Phoronopsis viridis, which reaches densities of 26,500 per square meter on tidal flats in California (USA), is unpalatable to many epibenthic predators, including fish and crabs. The unpalatability is strongest in the top section, including the lophophore, which is exposed to predators when phoronids feed. When the lophophores were removed in an experiment, the phoronids were more palatable, but this effect reduced over 12 days as the lophophores regenerated. These broadly effective defenses, which appear unusual among invertebrates inhabiting soft sediment, may be important in allowing Phoronopsis viridis to reach high densities. Some parasites infest phoronids: progenetic metacercariae and cysts of trematodes in phoronids' coelomic cavities; unidentified gregarines in phoronids' digestive tract; and an ancistrocomid ciliate parasite, Heterocineta, in the tentacles.

It is unknown whether phoronids have any significance for humans. The International Union for Conservation of Nature (IUCN) has not listed any phoronid species as endangered.

== Evolutionary history ==
=== Fossil record ===
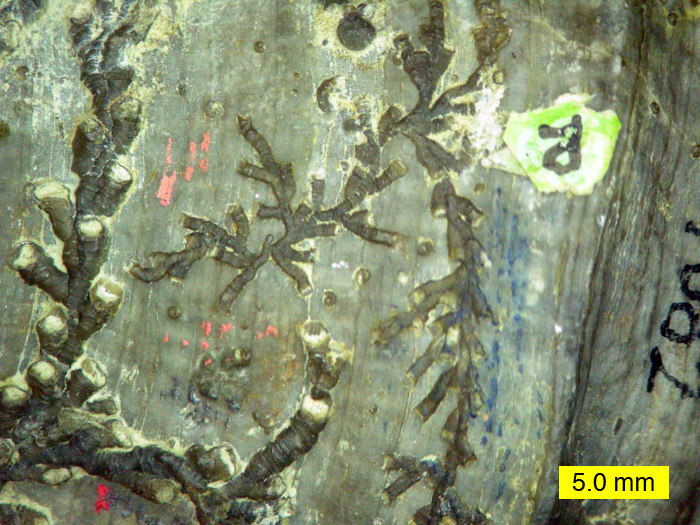
Branching colonies of hederellids

As of 2016 there are no indisputable body fossils of phoronids. Researching the Lower Cambrian Chengjiang fossils, in 1997 Chen and Zhou interpreted Iotuba chengjiangensis as a phoronid since it had tentacles and a U-shaped gut, and in 2004 Chen interpreted Eophoronis as a phoronid. However, in 2006 Conway Morris regarded Iotuba and Eophoronis as synonyms for the same genus, which in his opinion looked like the priapulid Louisella. In 2009 Balthasar and Butterfield found in western Canada two specimens from about 505 million years ago of a new fossil, Lingulosacculus nuda, which had two shells like those of brachiopods but not mineralized. In the authors' opinion, the U-shaped gut extended beyond the hinge line and outside the smaller shell. This would have precluded the attachment of muscles to close and open the shells, and the 50% of the animal's length beyond the hinge line would have needed longitudinal muscles and also a cuticle for protection. Hence they suggest that Lingulosacculus may have been a member of a phoronid stem group within the linguliform brachiopods. Another alternative is that Eccentrotheca lies somewhere in the phoronid stem lineage.

There is good evidence that species of Phoronis created the trace fossils of the ichnogenus Talpina, which have been found in the Devonian, Jurassic and Cretaceous periods. The Talpina animal bored into calcareous algae, corals, echinoid tests (shells), mollusc shells and the rostra of belemnites. Hederellids or Hederelloids are fossilized tubes, usually curved and between 0.1 and 1.8 mm wide, found from the Silurian to the Permian, and possibly in the Ordovician and Triassic. Their branching colonies may have been made by phoronids.

=== Family tree ===
Phoronids, brachiopods and bryozoans (ectoprocts) are collectively called lophophorates, because all feed using lophophores. From about the 1940s to the 1990s, family trees based on embryological and morphological features placed lophophorates among or as a sister group to the deuterostomes, a super-phylum that includes chordates and echinoderms. In the early development of their embryos, deuterostomes form the anus before the mouth, while protostomes form the mouth first.

Nielsen (2002) views the phoronids and brachiopods as affiliated with the deuterostome pterobranchs, which also filter-feed by tentacles, because the current-driving cells of the lophophores of all three have one cilium per cell, while lophophores of bryozoans, which he regards as protostomes, have multiple cilia per cell. Helmkampf, Bruchhaus and Hausdorf (2008) summarise several authors' embryological and morphological analyses which doubt or disagree that phoronids and brachiopods are deuterostomes:

- While deuterostomes have three coelomic cavities, lophophorates such as phoronids and brachiopods have only two.
- Pterobranchs may be a sub-group of enteropneusts ("acorn worms"). This suggests that the ancestral deuterostome looks more like a mobile worm-like enteropneust than a sessile colonial pterobranch. The fact that lophophorates and pterobranchs both use tentacles for feeding is probably not a synapomorphy of lophophorates and deuterostomes, but evolved independently as convergent adaptations to a sessile lifestyle.
- The mesoderm does not form by enterocoely in phoronids and bryozoans, but does in deuterostomes, while there are disagreements about whether brachiopods form the mesoderm by enterocoely.

- Protostomia
  - Ecdysozoa
    - Loricifera
    - Nematoida
      - Nematoda
      - Nematomorpha
    - Panarthropoda
      - Arthropoda
      - Onychophora
      - Tardigrada
    - Scalidophora
      - Kinorhyncha
      - Priapulida
  - Spiralia
    - Dicyemida
    - Orthonectida
    - Gnathifera
      - Gnathostomulida
      - - Chaetognatha
        - - Limnognathia
          - Rotifera
    - Platytrochozoa
      - Rouphozoa
        - Gastrotricha
        - Platyhelminthes
      - Symbion
      - Lophotrochozoa
        - Annelida
        - Mollusca
        - Nemertea
        - Lophophorata
          - Bryozoa
          - Entoprocta
          - Brachiozoa
            - Brachiopoda
            - Phoronida

Relationships of Phoronida to other protostomes

From 1988 onwards analyses based on molecular phylogeny, which compares biochemical features such as similarities in DNA, have placed phoronids and brachiopods among the Lophotrochozoa, a protostome super-phylum that includes molluscs, annelids and flatworms but excludes the other main protostome super-phylum Ecdysozoa, whose members include arthropods. Cohen wrote, "This inference, if true, undermines virtually all morphology–based reconstructions of phylogeny made during the past century or more."

While analyses by molecular phylogeny are confident that members of Lophotrochozoa are more closely related to each other than of non-members, the relationships between members are mostly unclear. The Lophotrochozoa are generally divided into: Lophophorata (animals that have lophophores), including Phoronida and Brachiopoda; Trochozoa (animals many of which have trochophore larvae), including molluscs, annelids, echiurans, sipunculans and nemerteans; and some other phyla (such as Platyhelminthes, Gastrotricha, Gnathostomulida, Micrognathozoa, and Rotifera).

Molecular phylogeny indicates that Phoronida are closely related to Brachiopoda, but Bryozoa (Ectoprocta) are not closely related to this group, despite using a similar lophophore for feeding and respiration. This implies that the traditional definition "Lophophorata" is not monophyletic. Recently the term "Lophophorata" has been applied only to the Phoronida and Brachiopoda, and Halanych (2004) thinks this change will cause confusion. Some analyses regard Phoronida and Brachiopoda as sister-groups, while others place Phoronida as a sub-group within Brachiopoda, implying that Brachiopoda is paraphyletic. Cohen and Weydman's analysis (2005) concludes that phoronids are a sub-group of inarticulate brachiopods (those in which the hinge between the two valves have no teeth and sockets) and sister-group of the other inarticulate sub-groups. The authors also suggest that the ancestors of molluscs and the brachiopod+phoronid clade diverged between 900 Ma and 560 Ma, most probably about 685 Ma.

== Taxonomy ==
Names of undisputed adult and larva species
Adult species	Larva species
Phoronis ovalis	(creeping larva)
Phoronis hippocrepia	Actinotrocha hippocrepia
Phoronis ijimai, also called Phoronis vancouverensis	Actinotrocha vancouverensis
Phoronis australis	(unknown)
Phoronis muelleri	Actinotrocha branchiata
Phoronis psammophila	Actinotrocha sabatieri
Phoronis pallida	Actinotrocha pallida
Phoronopsis albomaculata	(unknown)
Phoronopsis harmeri	Actinotrocha harmeri
Phoronopsis californica	(unknown)

The phylum has two genera, with no class or order names. Zoologists have given the larvae, usually called an actinotroch, a separate genus name from the adults.

In 1999 Temereva and Malakhov described Phoronis svetlanae. In 2000 Temereva described a new species, Phoronopsis malakhovi, while Emig regards it as a synonym for Phoronopsis harmeri. Santagata thinks Phoronis architecta is a different species from both Phoronis psammophila and Phoronis muelleri, and that "[the phoronids'] species diversity is currently underestimated". In 2009 Temereva described what may be larvae of Phoronopsis albomaculata and Phoronopsis californica. She wrote that, while there are 12 undisputed adult phoronid species, 25 morphological types of larvae have been identified.
