= Lophophore =

Feeding organ in the Lophophorata clade

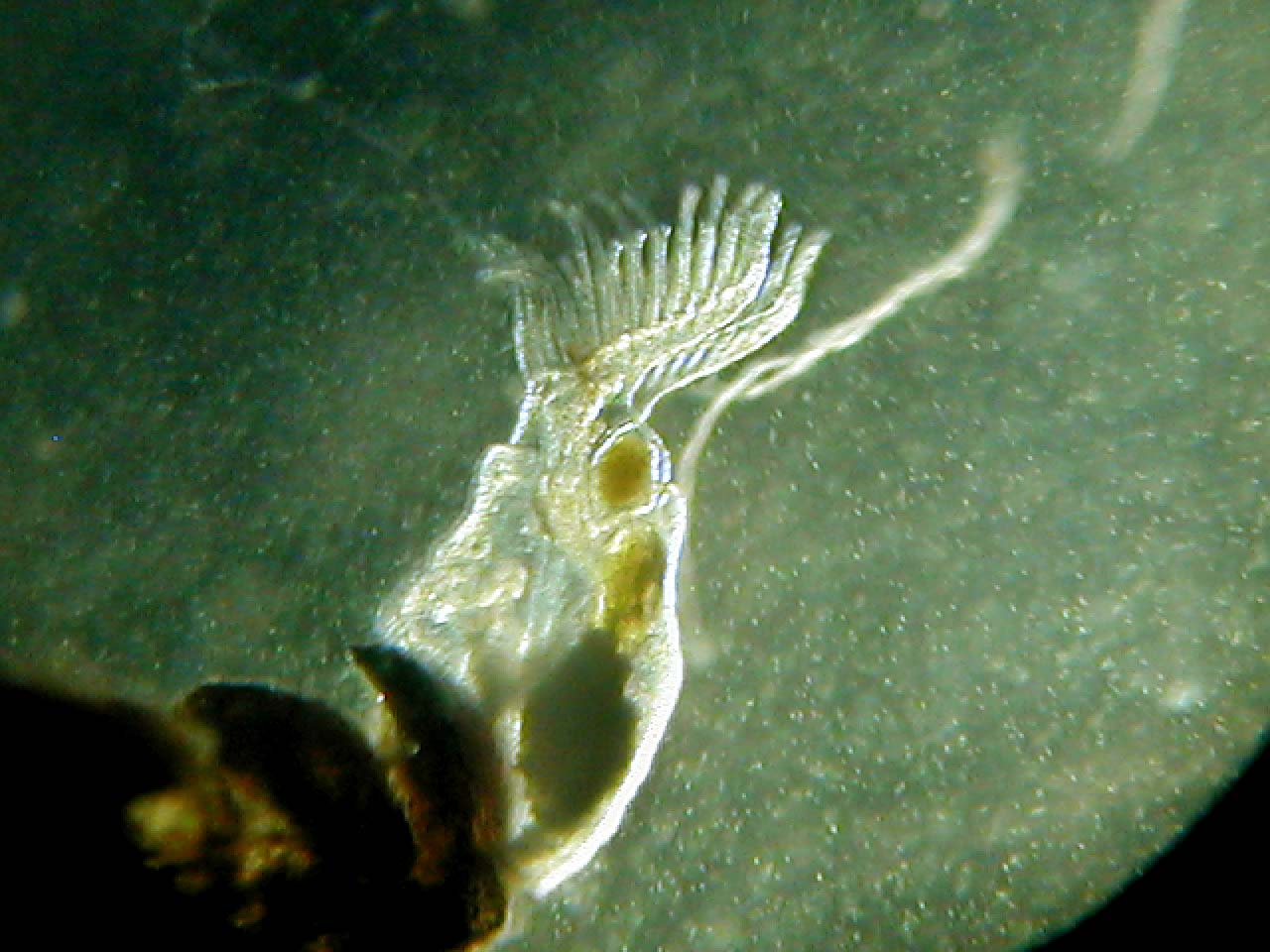
Freshwater bryozoan with lophophore extended

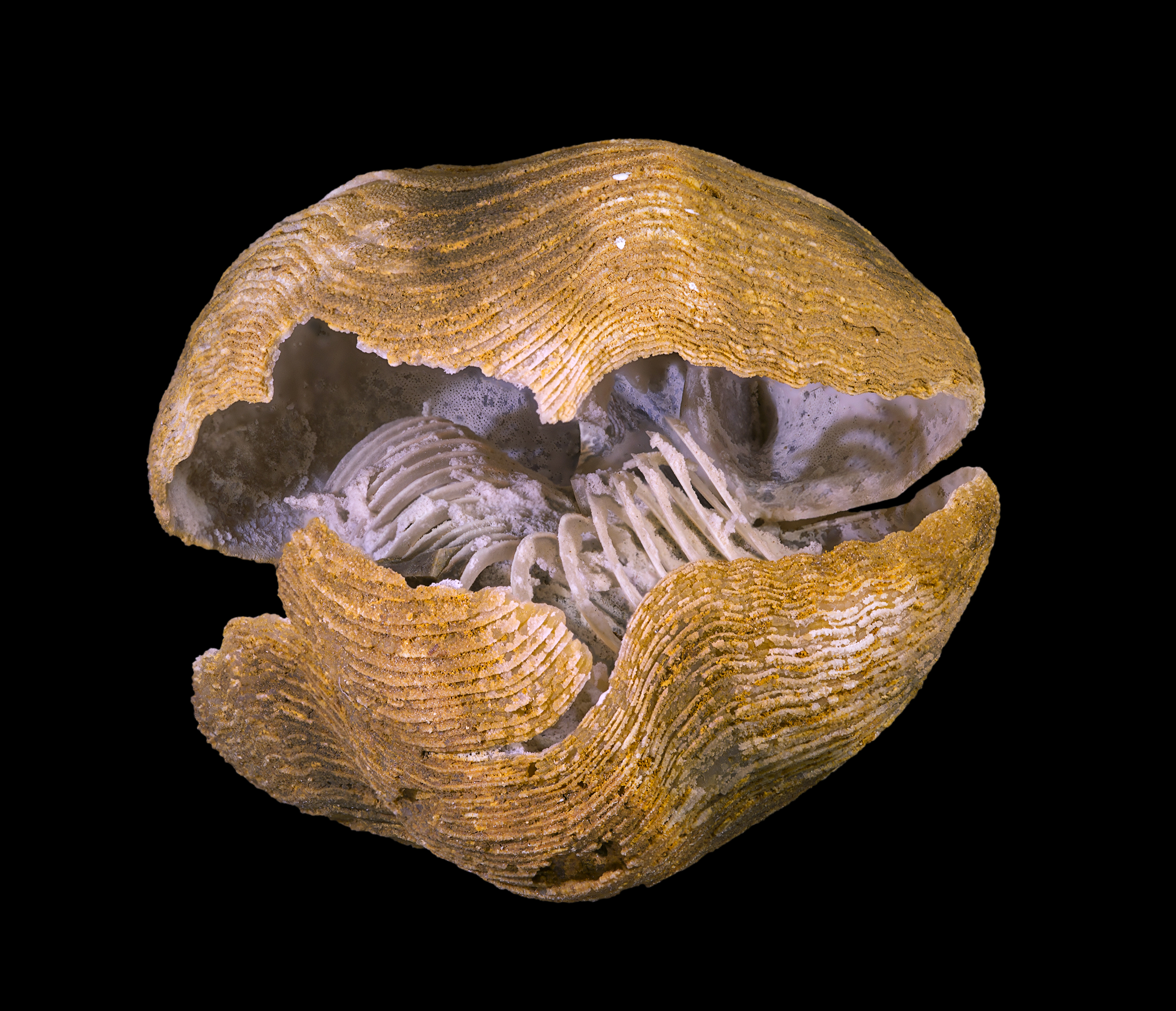
A brachidium (coiled structure), supporting the lophophore (feeding organ), visible between the valves of the Early Jurassic (Pliensbachian) brachiopod Spiriferina rostrata (35 x 30 mm)

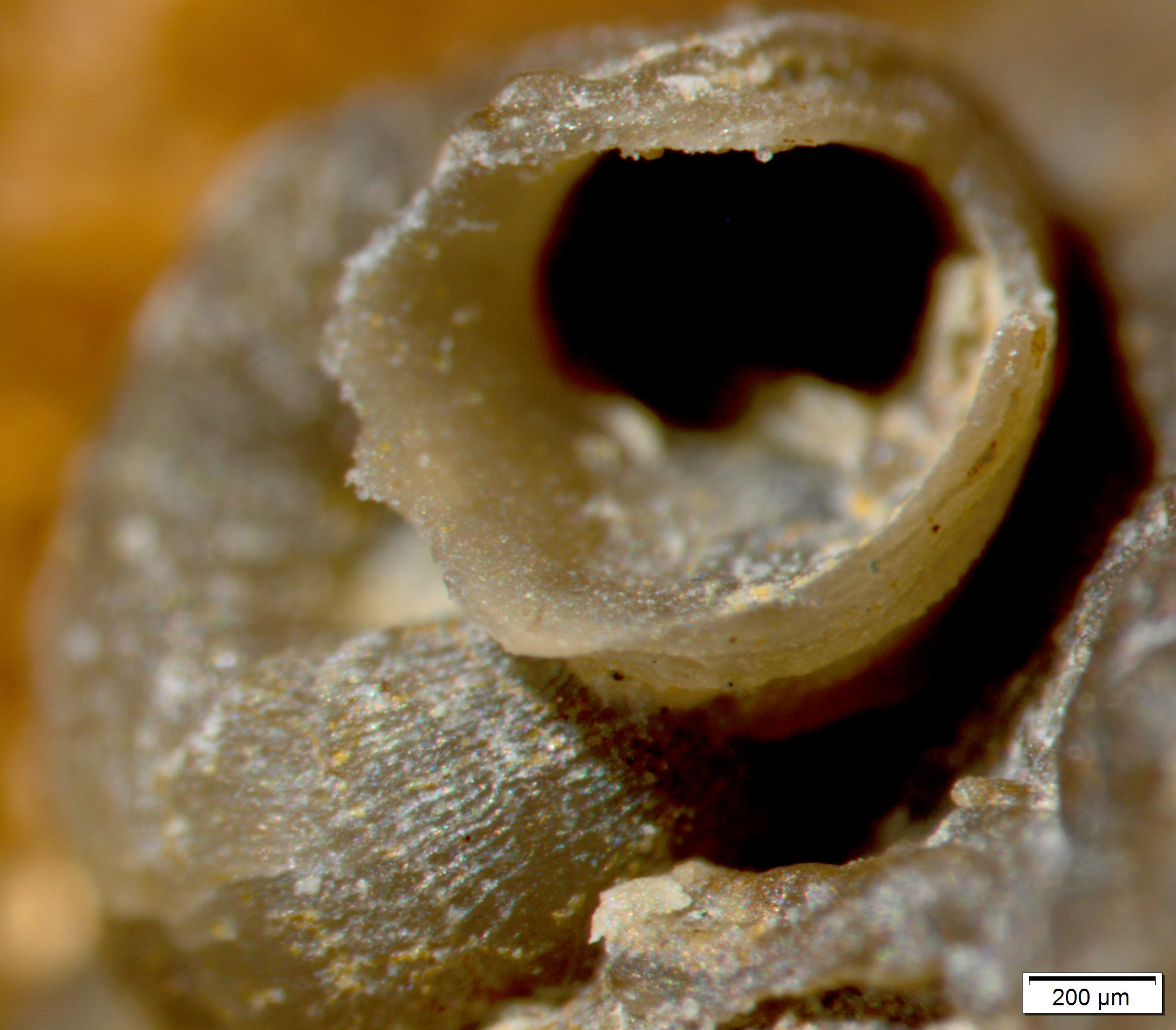
An extinct lophophorate: a Devonian microconchid (Potter Farm Formation, Alpena, Michigan)

The lophophore (/ˈlɒfəˌfɔːr, ˈloʊfə-/) is a characteristic feeding organ possessed by four major groups of animals: the Brachiopoda, Bryozoa, Hyolitha, and Phoronida, which collectively constitute the protostome group Lophophorata. All lophophores are found in aquatic organisms.

== Etymology ==
Lophophore is derived from the Greek lophos (crest, tuft) and -phore, -phoros (φορος) (bearing), a derivative of phérein (φέρειν) (to bear); thus crest-bearing.

== Characteristics ==
The lophophore can most easily be described as a ring of ciliated tentacles surrounding the mouth, but it is often horseshoe-shaped or coiled. Phoronids have their lophophores in plain view, but the valves of brachiopods must be opened wide to get a good view of their lophophore.

The lophophore surrounds the mouth and is an upstream collecting system for suspension feeding. Its tentacles are hollow, with extensions of a coelomic space thought to be a mesocoel. The gut is U-shaped with the anterior mouth at the center of the lophophore. The anus, where present, is also anterior but is dorsal to the mouth. In the Bryozoa, it is outside the ring of the lophophore. The articulate brachiopods do not have an anus.

== Classification of lophophorates ==
Groups with lophophores are called lophophorates. In the old view of metazoan phylogeny, the lophophorates were placed within the Deuterostomia. With the emergence of molecular phylogenies they have been reassessed and placed in a new superphylum known as the Lophotrochozoa in the Protostomia, which includes the Mollusca and Annelida. Newer phylogenies place the bryozoans in the group Polyzoa, which also includes entoprocts and Cycliophora, while molluscs, brachiozoans and annelids group together, with brachiozoans and annelids as possible sister taxa.

The extinct hederelloids, microconchids, cornulitids, and tentaculitids were likely lophophorates based on their biomineralization. The position of the Hyolitha has long been disputed, but as of 2017, it has been assigned to the Lophophorata as finely preserved specimens in the Burgess Shale can be seen to carry lophophores. Lophophorates did appear paraphyletic, but that is contested.
