= Tychoplankton =

Tychoplankton (Greek, "tycho", accident, chance) are organisms, such as free-living or attached benthic organisms and other non-planktonic organisms, that are carried into the plankton through a disturbance of their benthic habitat, or by winds and currents. This can occur by direct turbulence or by disruption of the substrate and subsequent entrainment in the water column. Tychoplankton are, therefore, a primary subdivision for sorting planktonic organisms by duration of lifecycle spent in the plankton, as neither their entire lives nor particular reproductive portions are confined to planktonic existence.

They are also known as accidental plankton or pseudo-plankton (compare: pseudoplankton), although "pseudoplankton" also defines organisms that do not themselves float but, rather, are attached to other organisms that float.

== See also ==
- Pseudoplankton
