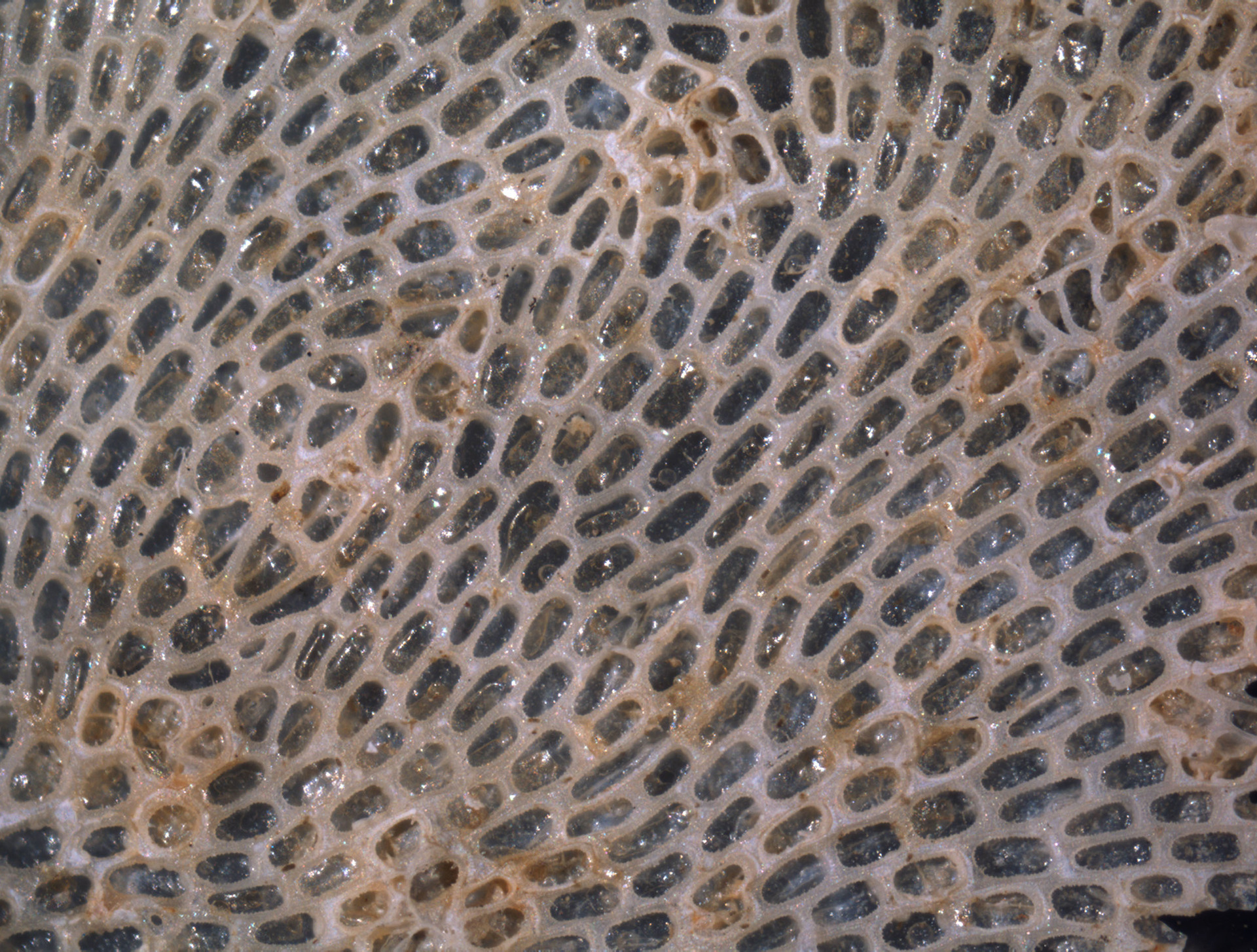
- Conopeum seurati

Scientific classification
- Domain: Eukaryota
- Kingdom: Animalia
- Phylum: Bryozoa
- Class: Gymnolaemata
- Order: Cheilostomatida
- Family: Electridae
- Genus: Conopeum
- Species: C. seurati

Binomial name
- Conopeum seurati (Canu, 1928)

= Conopeum seurati =

Species of moss animal

Conopeum seurati is a species of colonial bryozoan in the order Cheilostomatida. It is native to the northeastern Atlantic Ocean, the North Sea and the Mediterranean Sea. This species has been introduced to New Zealand and Florida.

== Description ==
Conopeum seurati is an encrusting bryozoan that forms small colonies on seagrasses, shells and other hard surfaces. When a larva of Conopeum seurati settles on a suitable surface, it undergoes metamorphosis into a zooid known as an ancestrula. This is oval in shape and measures about 0.55 by 0.33 mm (0.022 by 0.013 in).

The ancestrula buds to produce another zooid which has a pair of long spines at the distal end and sometimes a further three to five pairs of thin spines at the sides. Further asexual reproduction takes place, with each zooid producing several buds until there is a small, roughly circular encrusting cluster of zooids, white or brownish-white in colour, with the ancestrula at the centre. On flat surfaces the colony is regular and lacy in appearance but on uneven surfaces, it is more irregular and may form lobes. Some colonies are also spherical. Each individual zooid bears a lophophore, the characteristic feeding apparatus of bryozoans, with fifteen or sixteen ciliated tentacles, used to filter phytoplankton. The operculum, a flap that hinges to form a lid over the aperture of the lophophore, has a membranous edge and is chitinised. It is thick and crescent-shaped when closed. The walls between the zooids are calcified on the proximal edge and membranous elsewhere.

== Distribution and habitat ==
Conopeum seurati full distribution is unknown. It is found on the coasts of northern Europe and the Mediterranean Sea. It is considered to have been introduced to the Atlantic coast of Florida and to New Zealand. It is a fouling species and is found in brackish water, estuaries and lagoons where it can tolerate a wide range of salinities; these range from eighteen to forty parts per thousand in the Indian River Lagoon, and as little as one ppt. in Europe. It usually forms colonies on seagrasses, ditch grasses, floating seaweed, mussels, oysters and man-made structures.

== Biology ==
Like other bryozoans, Conopeum seurati is a suspension feeder, filtering phytoplankton from the water with its tentacles. Breeding takes place between June and October in Britain. The cyphonautes larvae are triangular in shape with brownish bivalve shells in their later developmental stages. These larvae are planktonic and drift with the currents for some time before settling and undergoing metamorphosis into ancestrulae to found new colonies.
