= Membraniporopsis =

Scientific classification
- Domain: Eukaryota
- Kingdom: Animalia
- Phylum: Bryozoa
- Class: Gymnolaemata
- Order: Cheilostomatida
- Family: Membraniporidae
- Genus: Membraniporopsis; Liu, 1999

Genus of bryozoans

Membraniporopsis is a genus of bryozoans belonging to the family Sinoflustridae.

The species of this genus are found in Southern America.

== Species ==
Species:

- Membraniporopsis bifloris (Wang & Tung, 1976)
- Membraniporopsis bispinosa (Liu, 1992)
- Membraniporopsis serrilamelloides (Liu & Li, 1987)
- Membraniporopsis tubigera (Osburn, 1940)
