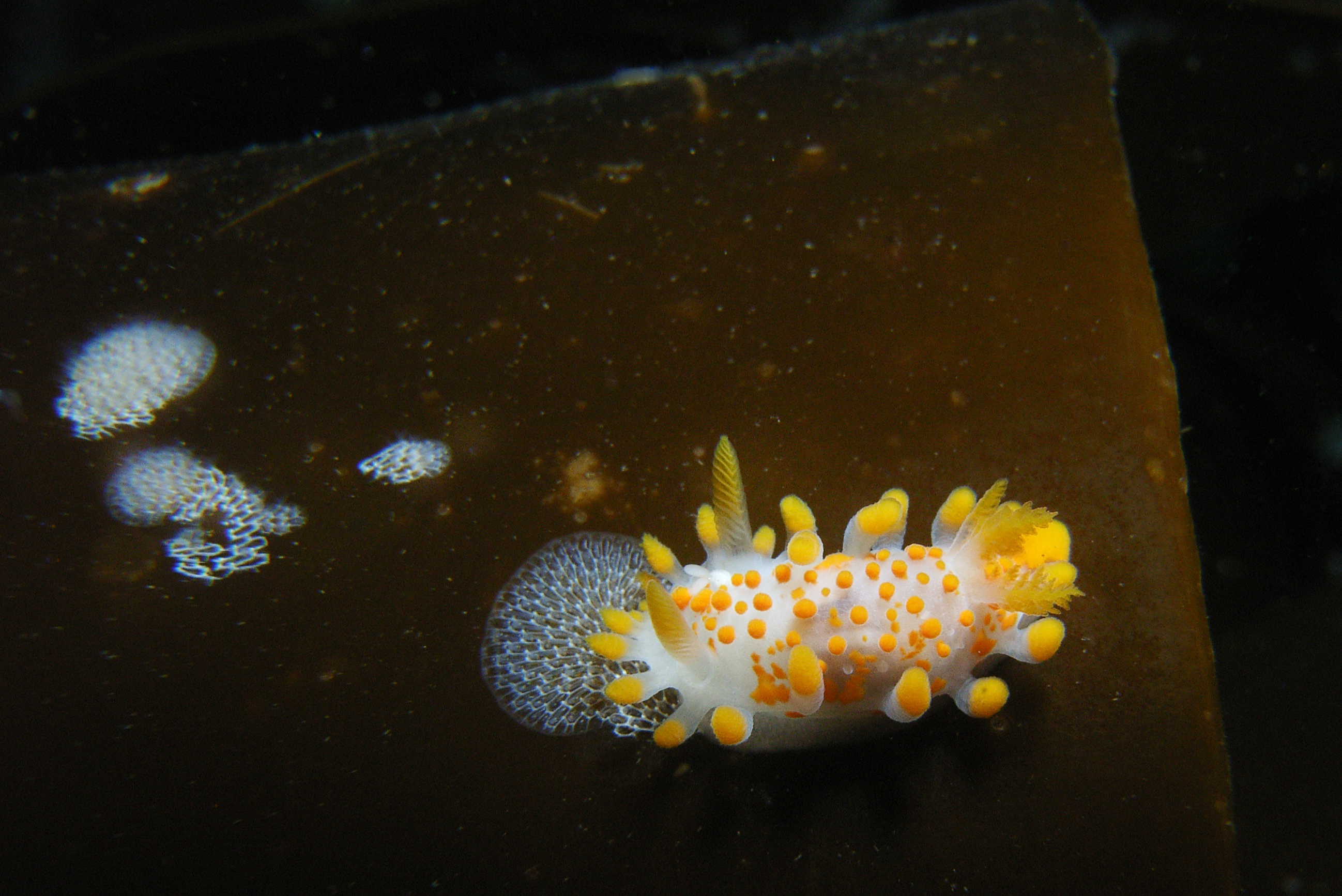
- Limacia clavigera grazing on Membranipora membranacea

Scientific classification
- Kingdom: Animalia
- Phylum: Mollusca
- Class: Gastropoda
- Order: Nudibranchia
- Family: Polyceridae
- Genus: Limacia
- Species: L. clavigera

Binomial name
- Limacia clavigera (O. F. Müller, 1776)

Synonyms
- Doris clavigera O. F. Müller, 1776 (original combination); Euplocamus plumosus Thompson, 1840; Tergipes pulcher Johnston, 1834

= Limacia clavigera =

Species of gastropod

Limacia clavigera, sometimes known by the common name orange-clubbed sea slug, is a sea slug, a species of dorid nudibranch. It is a marine gastropod mollusc in the family Polyceridae.

== Distribution ==
Limacia clavigera is commonly found on the lower shore and in sublittoral algae belts along the Atlantic coast of Europe, including the British Isles, and from Norway to Portugal. It has been found from the intertidal zone to depths of at least 20 m. It is replaced by Limacia inesae in the Mediterranean Sea.

It has also been reported along the South African coast from Saldanha Bay to Port Alfred. This disjunct distribution was an indication of several related species being included under one name. Some of these South African animals are referable to Limacia lucida and others belong to Limacia jellyi.

== Description ==
Limacia clavigera is a small (up to 20 mm), white-bodied dorid with numerous orange-tipped projections on its body and scattered, raised, orange spots on its notum. Its gills and perfoliate rhinophores are orange-tipped.

== Ecology ==
This species feeds on the encrusting bryozoan Electra pilosa as well as Membranipora membranacea and is often seen on encrusted red algae or kelp. Its egg ribbon is a flat broad spiral of several coils.
