= Jellyella tuberculata =

Scientific classification
- Kingdom: Animalia
- Phylum: Bryozoa
- Class: Gymnolaemata
- Order: Cheilostomatida
- Family: Membraniporidae
- Genus: Jellyella
- Species: J. tuberculata

Binomial name
- Jellyella tuberculata (Bosc, 1802)

Species of bryozoan

Jellyella tuberculata, commonly called Sargassum sea mat, is a species of bryozoan in the family Membraniporidae. The bryozoan is commonly associated with the species of Sargassum, a genus of brown algae, but may be found on other macroalgae.

== Description ==
As with other species of bryozoans, the Sargassum sea mat is a colonial species made of many individual zooids that form an encrusting mat. The autozooids are oblong, measuring about 0.5 to 0.6 mm long and 0.35 to 0.4 mm wide. Many of these autozooids have a single marginal spinule. Each zooid lives in a skeletal chamber made mostly of calcium carbonate. At the frontal proximal angle, gymnocystal tubercles are clear. The distal walls are shelf-like and have up to ten uniporous septula.

== Distribution and habitat ==
The Sargassum sea mat has a large geographic range that spans most tropical to temperate regions on the world's oceans. Within this range, the bryozoan is often found living on seaweed, especially Sargassum, including the pelagic S. natans and S. fluitans. This host choice is where the bryozoan gets its common name from. Sargassum sea mat has also been found to live on plastic debris.
