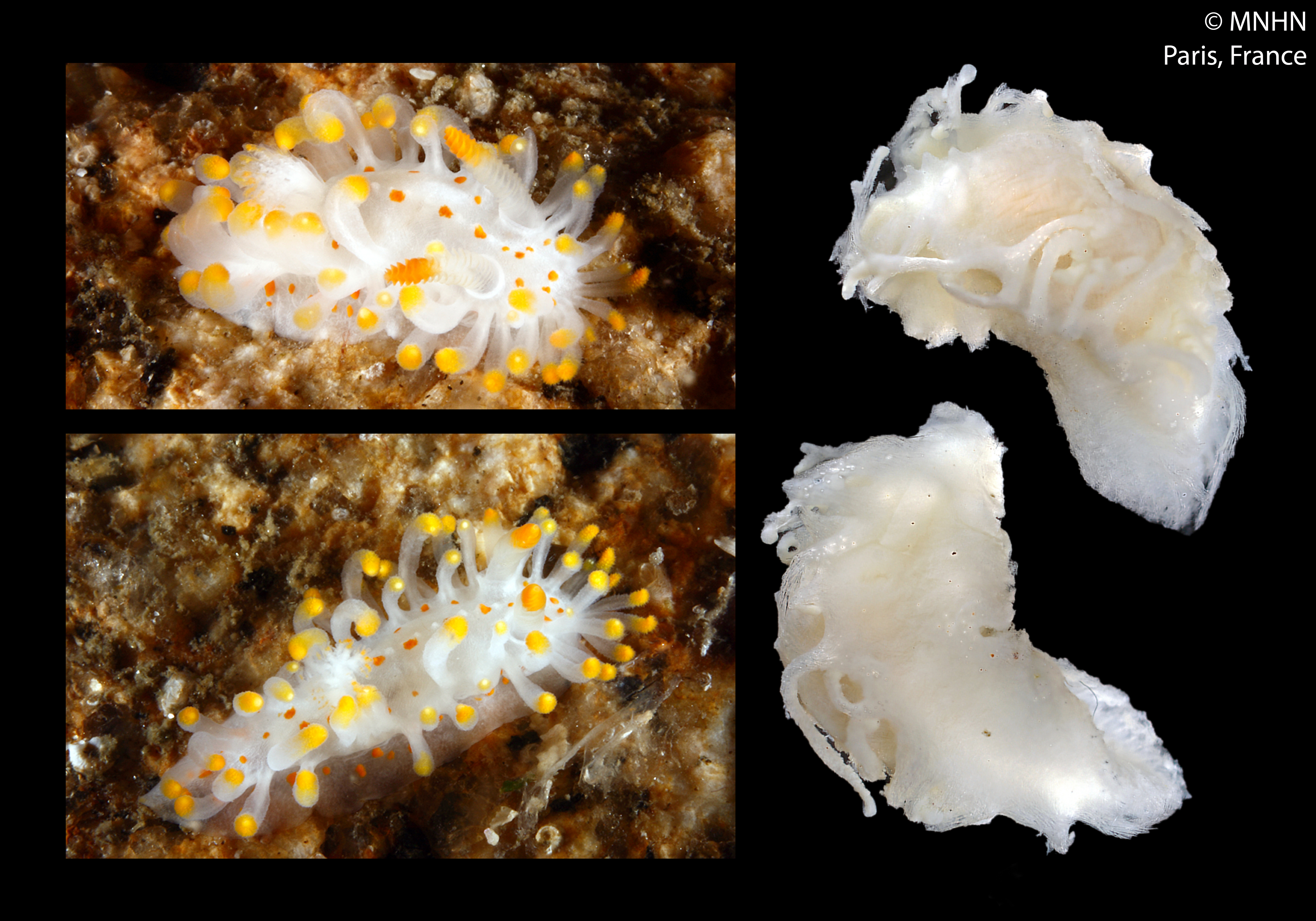
- Limacia iberica (holotype at MNHN, Paris)

Scientific classification
- Kingdom: Animalia
- Phylum: Mollusca
- Class: Gastropoda
- Order: Nudibranchia
- Family: Polyceridae
- Genus: Limacia
- Species: L. iberica

Binomial name
- Limacia iberica Caballer Gutiérrez, M., Almón Pazos, B. & Pérez Dieste, J., 2015

= Limacia iberica =

Species of gastropod

Limacia iberica, is a sea slug, a species of dorid nudibranch. It is a marine gastropod mollusc in the family Polyceridae.

== Description ==
The length of the species attains 9 mm.

== Distribution ==
Limacia iberica was described from Shelf “O Sobreiro”, 42°30.7970′N 008°58.6880′W in the Ría de Arousa, Galicia, Atlantic coast of Spain.
