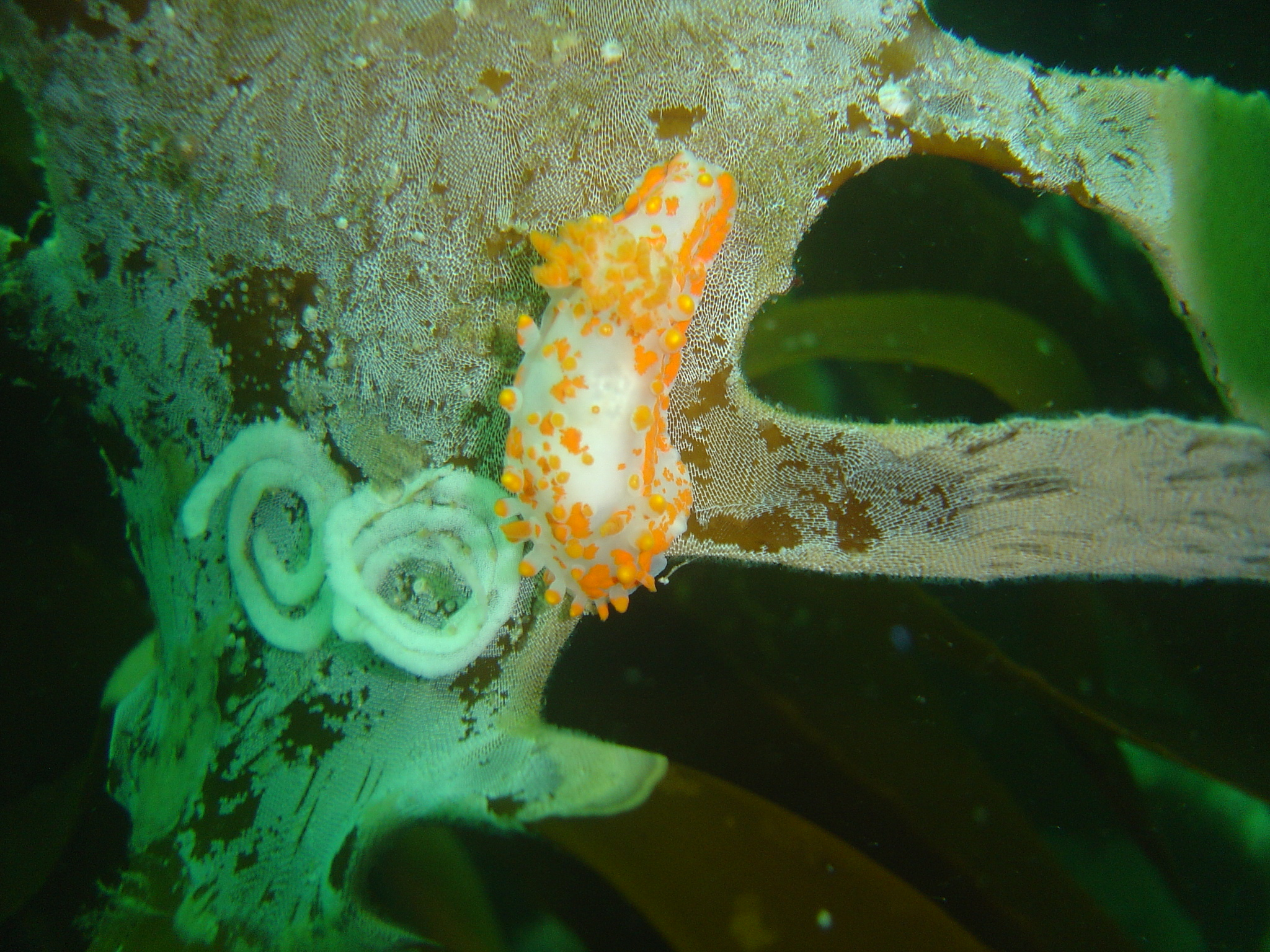
- Orange clubbed nudibranch near Photographers Reef, Simon's Town.

Scientific classification
- Kingdom: Animalia
- Phylum: Mollusca
- Class: Gastropoda
- Order: Nudibranchia
- Family: Polyceridae
- Genus: Limacia
- Species: L. lucida

Binomial name
- Limacia lucida (Stimpson, 1854)

= Limacia lucida =

Species of gastropod

Limacia lucida is a sea slug, a species of dorid nudibranch. It is a marine gastropod mollusc in the family Polyceridae.

== Distribution ==
Limacia lucida was described from Simon's Bay, Cape of Good Hope, South Africa. It has been treated as a synonym of Limacia clavigera.
