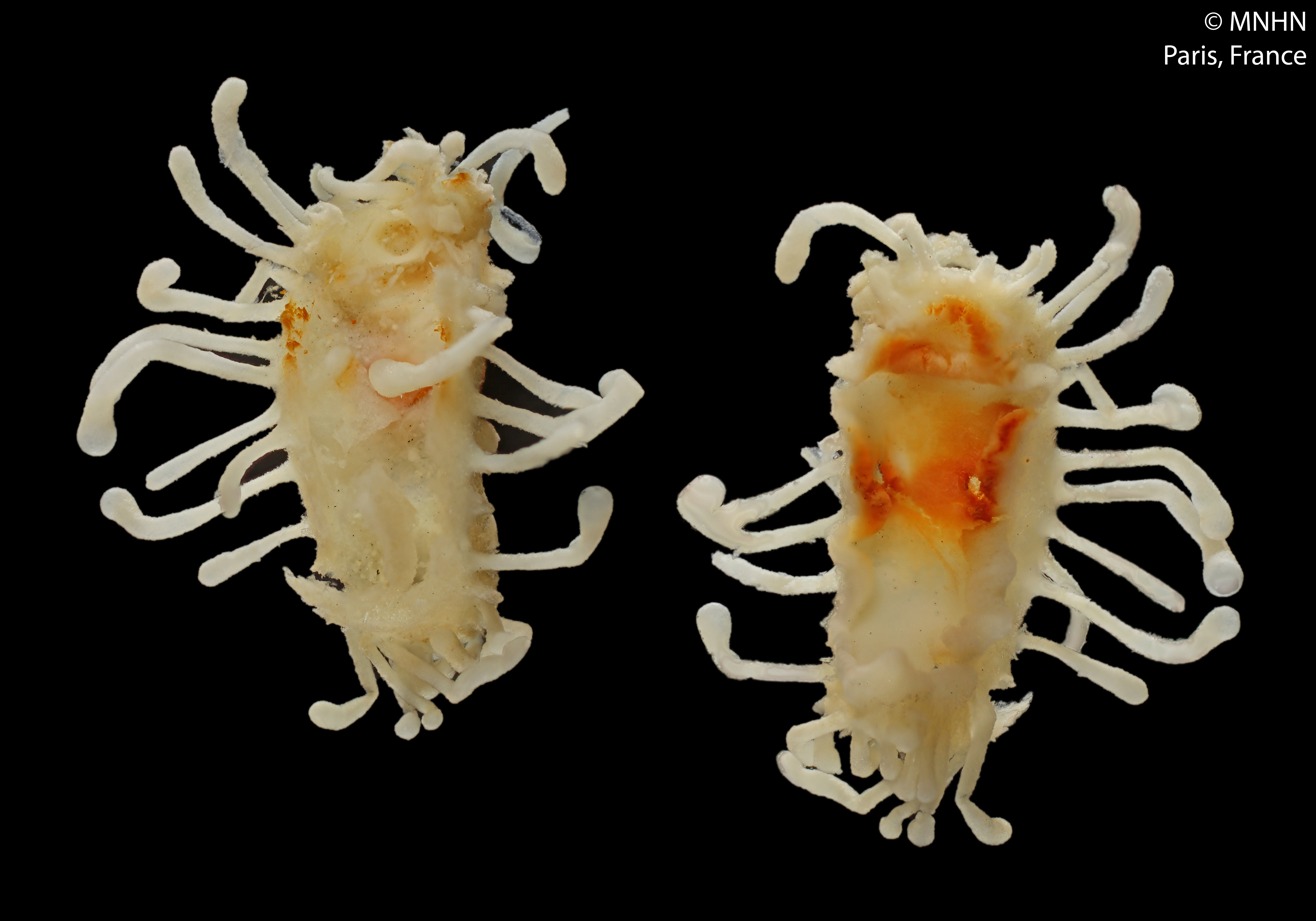
- PRESERVED_SPECIMEN; Limacia annulata Vallès, Valdés & Ortea, 2000; Type status: PARATYPE; Identified by: N/A; Individual count: 1; Event date: N/A

Scientific classification
- Kingdom: Animalia
- Phylum: Mollusca
- Class: Gastropoda
- Order: Nudibranchia
- Family: Polyceridae
- Genus: Limacia
- Species: L. annulata

Binomial name
- Limacia annulata Vallès, Valdés & Ortea, 2000

= Limacia annulata =

Species of gastropod

Limacia annulata, is a sea slug, a species of dorid nudibranch. It is a marine gastropod mollusc in the family Polyceridae.

== Description ==
Limacia annulata has small appendages, a whiteish body color with red or yellow markings, tiny bumps along their mantle edges, and spicules on their skin.

The length of the species attains 5.6 mm.

== Distribution ==
Limacia annulata was described from Praia São Tiago, Bengo Province, 08°35′S 013°21′E, Angola.
