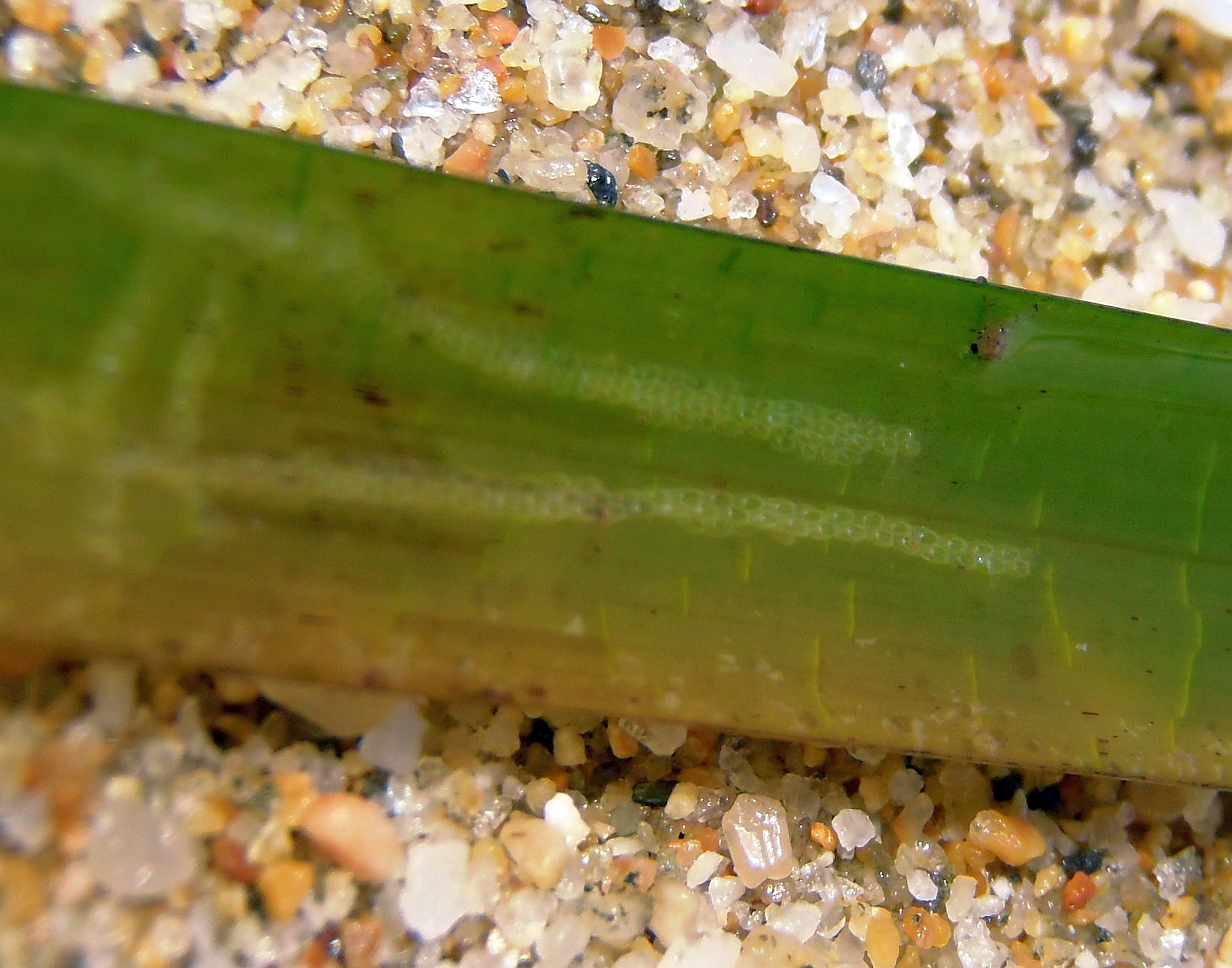
- Electra posidoniae

Scientific classification
- Kingdom: Animalia
- Phylum: Bryozoa
- Class: Gymnolaemata
- Order: Cheilostomatida
- Family: Electridae
- Genus: Electra; Lamouroux, 1816

= Electra (bryozoan) =

Genus of aquatic invertebrates

Electra is a genus of bryozoans belonging to the family Electridae.

The genus has cosmopolitan distribution.

Species:

- Electra arcuata (Canu, 1908)
- Electra asiatica Grischenko, Dick & Mawatari, 2007
- Electra pilosa
- Electra posidoniae
