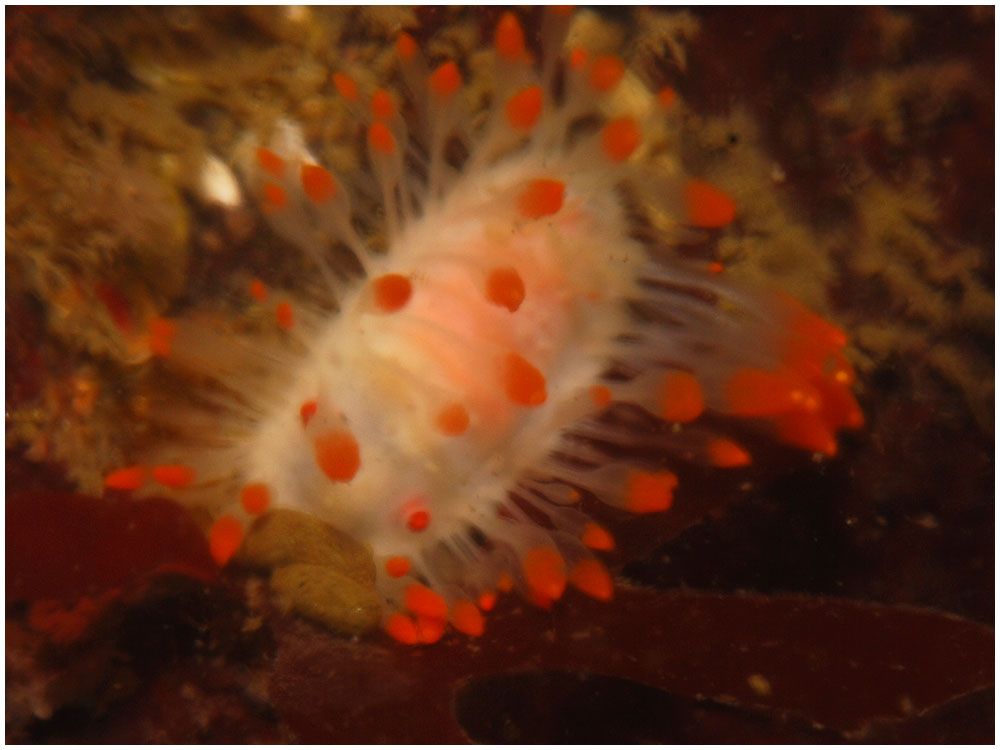

Scientific classification
- Kingdom: Animalia
- Phylum: Mollusca
- Class: Gastropoda
- Order: Nudibranchia
- Family: Polyceridae
- Genus: Limacia
- Species: L. cockerelli

Binomial name
- Limacia cockerelli (MacFarland, 1905)

Synonyms
- Laila cockerelli

= Limacia cockerelli =

Species of sea slug

Limacia cockerelli is a species of sea slug, a dorid nudibranch, a shell-less marine gastropod mollusc in the family Polyceridae.

== Distribution ==
This species is found on the West coast of North America, ranging from Vancouver Island, British Columbia, Canada to San Diego. It was also reported in the Gulf of California at Bahía de los Ángeles, but those records are now known to be the similar species Limacia mcdonaldi.

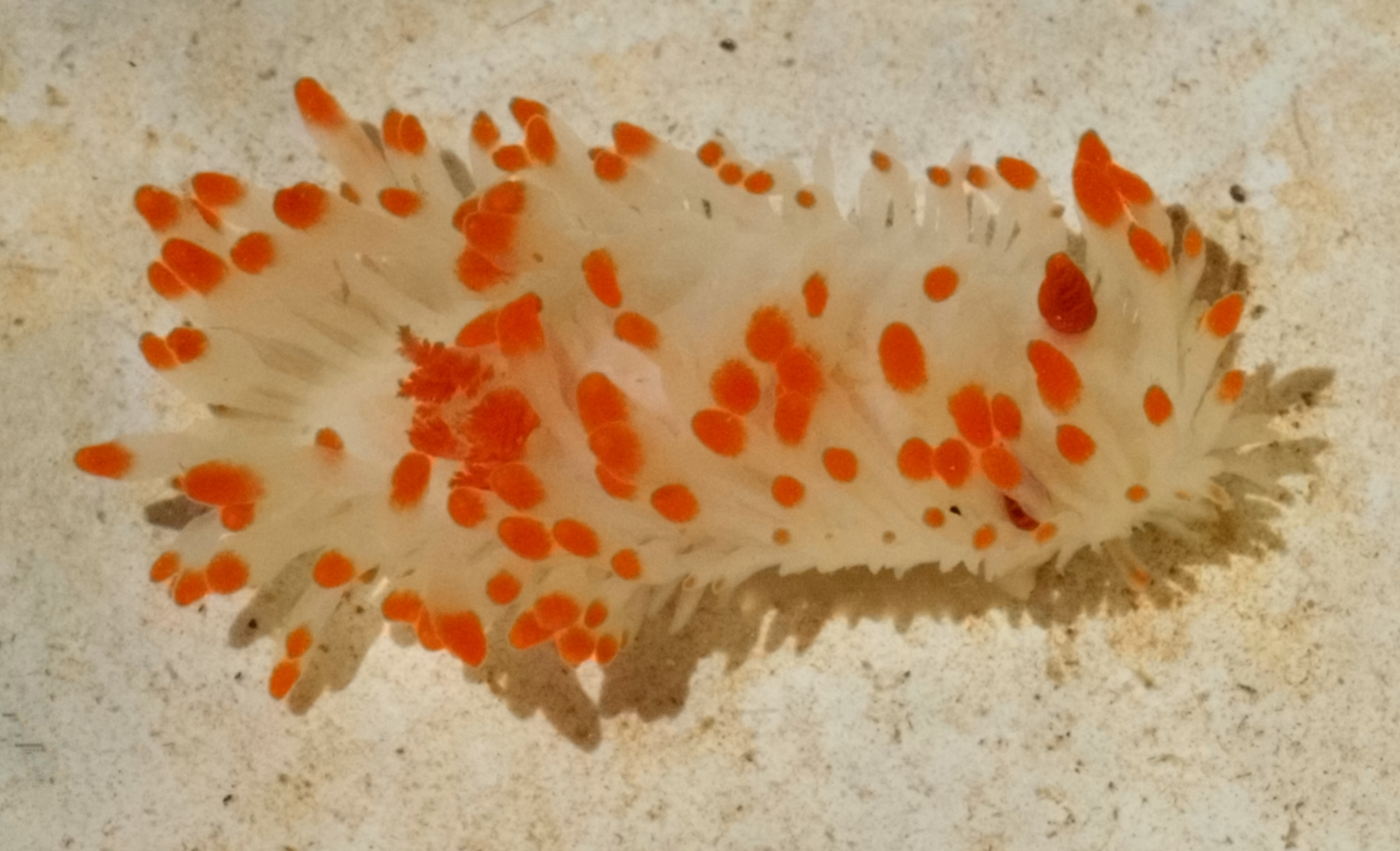
Limacia cockerelli

== Description ==
This species reaches lengths of 26 mm (1.0 in). It has long dorsal papillae with orange-red tips and white branchial plumes with red tips. There is a broad band of white tubercles down the middle of the dorsum which may sometimes have a small spot of orange at the apex. The second form, found in areas south of Point Conception has tubercles that are in a mid-dorsal line, slightly longer and tipped with orange. Another form in California has large red blotches on the dorsum. The eggs of Limacia cockerelli are pink and develop after 17 days (at 10–13 °C [50–55 °F]) into hatching planktotrophic veligers. It was thought likely that the southern form represented a species complex, which was confirmed in 2017 with the description of Limacia mcdonaldi.

== Diet ==
This animal preys exclusively on the orange-brown coloured bryozoan, Hincksina velata.

== Taxonomy ==
First described by Frank MacFarland in 1905 and originally named Laila cockerelli in honour of Theodore D. A. Cockerell.
