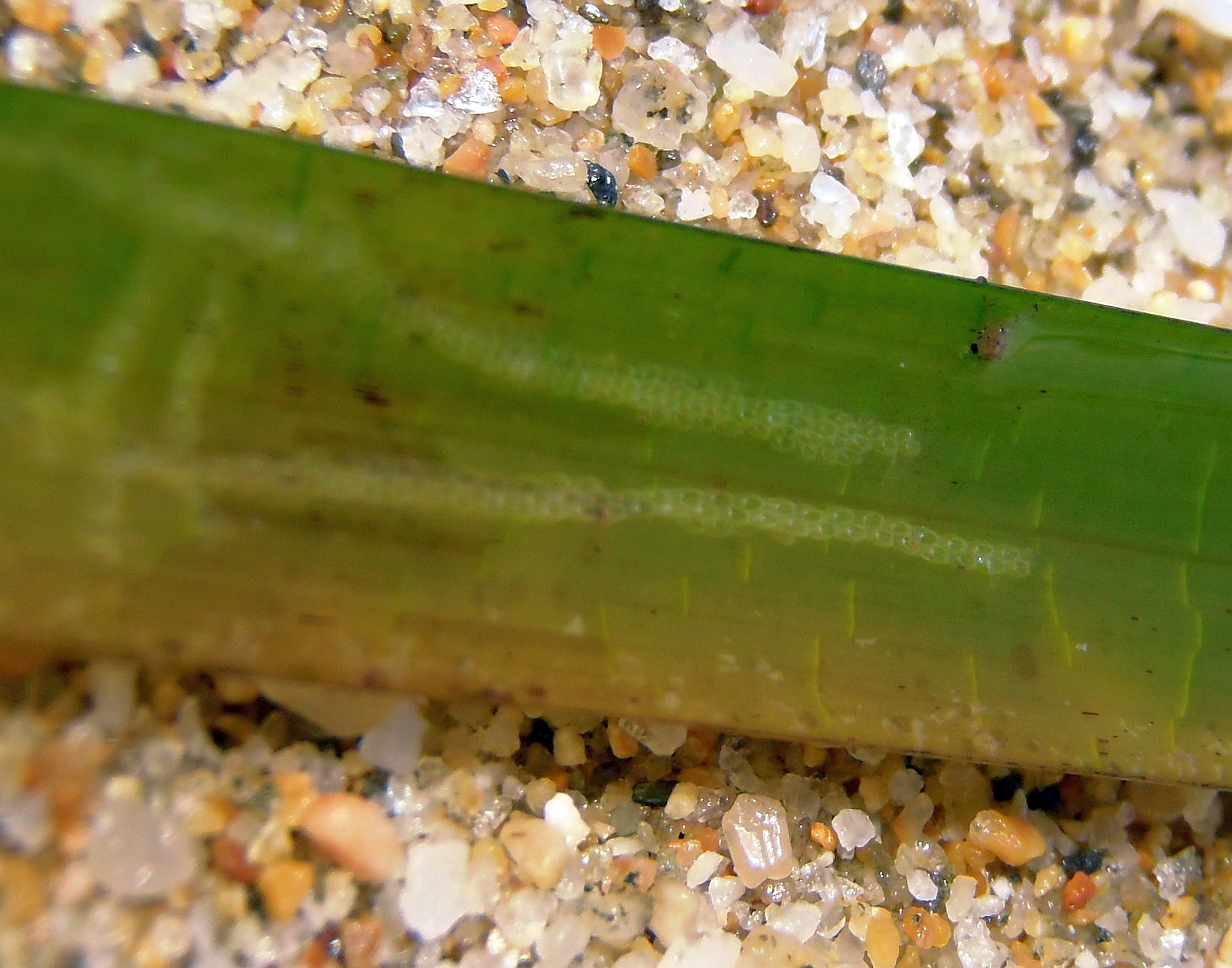
- Electra posidoniae on Posidonia oceanica, Sardinia, Italy

Scientific classification
- Kingdom: Animalia
- Phylum: Bryozoa
- Class: Gymnolaemata
- Order: Cheilostomatida
- Family: Electridae
- Genus: Electra
- Species: E. posidoniae

Binomial name
- Electra posidoniae Gautier, 1954

= Electra posidoniae =

Species of bryozoan (marine moss animal)

Electra posidoniae is a species of bryozoan in the family Electridae. It is endemic to the Mediterranean Sea, and is commonly known as the Neptune-grass bryozoan because it is exclusively found growing on seagrasses, usually on Neptune grass (Posidonia oceanica), but occasionally on eelgrass (Zostera marina).

== Description ==
Electra posidoniae is a white bryozoan forming encrusting colonies of zooids on the leaves of seagrasses. The colonies consist of irregularly branching ribbons formed from a single layer of zooids, up to four zooids wide, neatly arranged in parallel rows along the length of the leaf blade. The colonies can reach 10 cm (4 in) in length; they are poorly calcified which makes the colony flexible and able to bend as the leaf moves in the water. This species could be confused with Electra pilosa, which also grows in the Mediterranean, but that species tends to grow in star-shaped colonies that have a rough or bristly appearance.

== Distribution and habitat ==
Electra posidoniae is endemic to the Mediterranean Sea where it grows on Posidonia oceanica and occasionally Zostera marina. These seagrasses grow in soft sediment at depths down to about 35 m (115 ft). They have rhizomes sending up tufts of leaves of new leaves and losing their old foliage in the autumn. Electra posidoniae is the most common bryozoan on P. oceanica in the Mediterranean in the depth range 15 to 30 m (50 to 100 ft). It has a life cycle synchronised with that of the grass.

== Ecology ==
Bryozoans feed on diatoms and organic particles which the lophophores extract from the water flowing past. The food particles are passed to the central mouth and used by the colony for maintenance and growth. The colony grows by budding off new zooids. There are also specialised reproductive zooids, with male and female units, and occasionally hermaphrodites, in the same colony. The embryos are brooded in a membranous pouch inside the zooid for a while and then have a planktonic larval stage lasting several months, during which they can disperse widely. Very few colonies are present on Posidonia oceanica during the winter, with recruitment occurring in the early spring, at a time when the seagrass is beginning to grow new foliage and there is an increased availability of phytoplankton on which the colonies can feed. Bryozoans tend to dominate the epiphytic growth on seagrass in the first part of the year, but by late summer, the availability of phytoplankton is lower, and macroalgae are more abundant and competing for space, and the number of bryozoan colonies decrease. The nudibranch Polycera quadrilineata is a specialised feeder, grazing on Electra posidoniae and other bryozoans.
