= Jellyella =

- Jellyella eburnea on a Spirula shell

Scientific classification
- Kingdom: Animalia
- Phylum: Bryozoa
- Class: Gymnolaemata
- Order: Cheilostomatida
- Family: Membraniporidae
- Genus: Jellyella; Taylor and Monks, 1997

Genus of moss animals

Jellyella is a genus of bryozoans in the family Membraniporidae.

== Etymology ==
The genus is named in honour of Eliza Catherine Jelly (1829–1914), of Cornwall, England, in honour of her contributions to the study of bryozoans.

== Morphology ==
Jellyella closely resemble Membranipora, and in common with other members of the family Membraniporidae has twinned ancestrular zooids. However, Jellyella can be distinguished by the presence of intricately branched processes (called spinules) projecting into the zooidal chambers. Jellyella also have a calcitic skeletal ultrastructure made up of transversely arranged, elongate spindles.

== Ecology ==
Jellyella is unusual in being a pseudoplanktonic bryozoan found encrusting floating objects, both natural and artificial. Jellyella eburnea is common on shells of the squid Spirula (which become detached from the soft body of the squid after death) and on the shells of the planktonic gastropod Janthina.

Jellyella tuberculata grows on the floating alga Sargassum, and on flat-bladed kelp and other seaweeds around the Cape Peninsula of South Africa. In Cape waters it is preyed upon by the crazed nudibranch, Corambe sp.

By contrast, most other bryozoans are benthic, encrusting hard substrates such as kelp or rocks.

Jellyella can live through various ocean environments. Its growth efficiency increase as food concentration increases <Swezey>

== Species ==
- Jellyella eburnea (Hincks, 1891). Tropical Pacific, Atlantic, Indian Oceans.
- Jellyella tuberculata (Bosc, 1802). Widespread, subtropical. Colloquially known as the Gulf weed bryozoan.
