= Biflustra =

Scientific classification
- Domain: Eukaryota
- Kingdom: Animalia
- Phylum: Bryozoa
- Class: Gymnolaemata
- Order: Cheilostomatida
- Family: Membraniporidae
- Genus: Biflustra d'Orbigny, 1852

Synonyms
- Acanthodesia Canu & Bassler, 1919

Genus of bryozoans

Biflustra is a genus of bryozoans belonging to the family Membraniporidae.

The genus has cosmopolitan distribution.

== Species ==
Species:

- Biflustra actaeon d'Orbigny, 1852
- Biflustra adenticulata Boonzaaier-Davids, Florence & Gibbons, 2020
- Biflustra ajantarensis (Guha, 1989)
- Biflustra akshiensis Badve & Sonar, 1995
- Biflustra amata d'Orbigny, 1852
- Biflustra antidenticulata Boonzaaier-Davids, Florence & Gibbons, 2020
- Biflustra aquitanica Jullien, 1903
- Biflustra arborescens (Canu & Bassler, 1928)
- Biflustra bartschi (Canu & Bassler, 1929)
- Biflustra bifossata (Brown, 1952)
- Biflustra bituberculata d'Orbigny, 1852
- Biflustra cetrata (Harmer, 1926)
- Biflustra chainei (Vigneaux, 1949)
- Biflustra chakrudensis (Guha, 1989)
- Biflustra clathrata (Philippi, 1844)
- Biflustra conjunctiva (Zhang & Liu, 1995)
- Biflustra delta Brown, 1958
- Biflustra denticulata (Busk, 1856)
- Biflustra eriophoroidea (Liu, 1992)
- Biflustra falsitenuis (Liu, 1992)
- Biflustra falunica Buge, 1969
- Biflustra grandicella (Canu & Bassler, 1929)
- Biflustra holocenica Vieira, Spotorno-Oliveira & Tâmega, 2019
- Biflustra hugliensis (Robertson, 1921)
- Biflustra irregulata (Liu, 1991)
- Biflustra kralicensis Prochazka, 1894
- Biflustra lamellosa (Canu & Bassler, 1920)
- Biflustra lamellosa (Canu & Bassler, 1929)
- Biflustra limosa (Waters, 1909)
- Biflustra limosoidea (Liu, 1991)
- Biflustra lingdingensis (Liu & Li, 1987)
- Biflustra marcusi Vieira, Almeida & Winston, 2016
- Biflustra mathuri Chiplonkar, 1939
- Biflustra mitiensis Guha & Gopikrishna, 2005
- Biflustra monilifera (Canu & Bassler, 1919)
- Biflustra nana (von Hagenow, 1851)
- Biflustra oblongula (Ulrich & Bassler, 1904)
- Biflustra okadai Almeida, Souza & Vieira, 2017
- Biflustra osnabrugensis Reuss, 1864
- Biflustra papillata Stoliczka, 1865
- Biflustra paragrandicella (Liu, 2001)
- Biflustra parasavartii (Liu, 1999)
- Biflustra paulensis (Marcus, 1937)
- Biflustra perambulata Louis & Menon, 2009
- Biflustra perfragilis MacGillivray, 1881
- Biflustra puelcha (d'Orbigny, 1842)
- Biflustra pura (Hincks, 1880)
- Biflustra quadrata Canu & Bassler, 1929
- Biflustra quadrilatera (Canu & Bassler, 1935)
- Biflustra ramosa (d'Orbigny, 1852)
- Biflustra rectangularia (Canu & Bassler, 1923)
- Biflustra regularis (Canu & Bassler, 1935)
- Biflustra regularis (Maplestone, 1901)
- Biflustra regularis d'Orbigny, 1852
- Biflustra rynchota Waters, 1878
- Biflustra savartii (Audouin, 1826)
- Biflustra similis (Liu, 1992)
- Biflustra sphinx Vieira, Almeida & Winston, 2016
- Biflustra stammeri (Borg, 1931)
- Biflustra tenuis (Desor, 1848)
- Biflustra teres (Novak, 1877)
- Biflustra texturata (Reuss, 1848)
- Biflustra tuberosa (Canu, 1908)
- Biflustra typica (Canu & Bassler, 1923)
- Biflustra virgata (Canu & Bassler, 1929)
