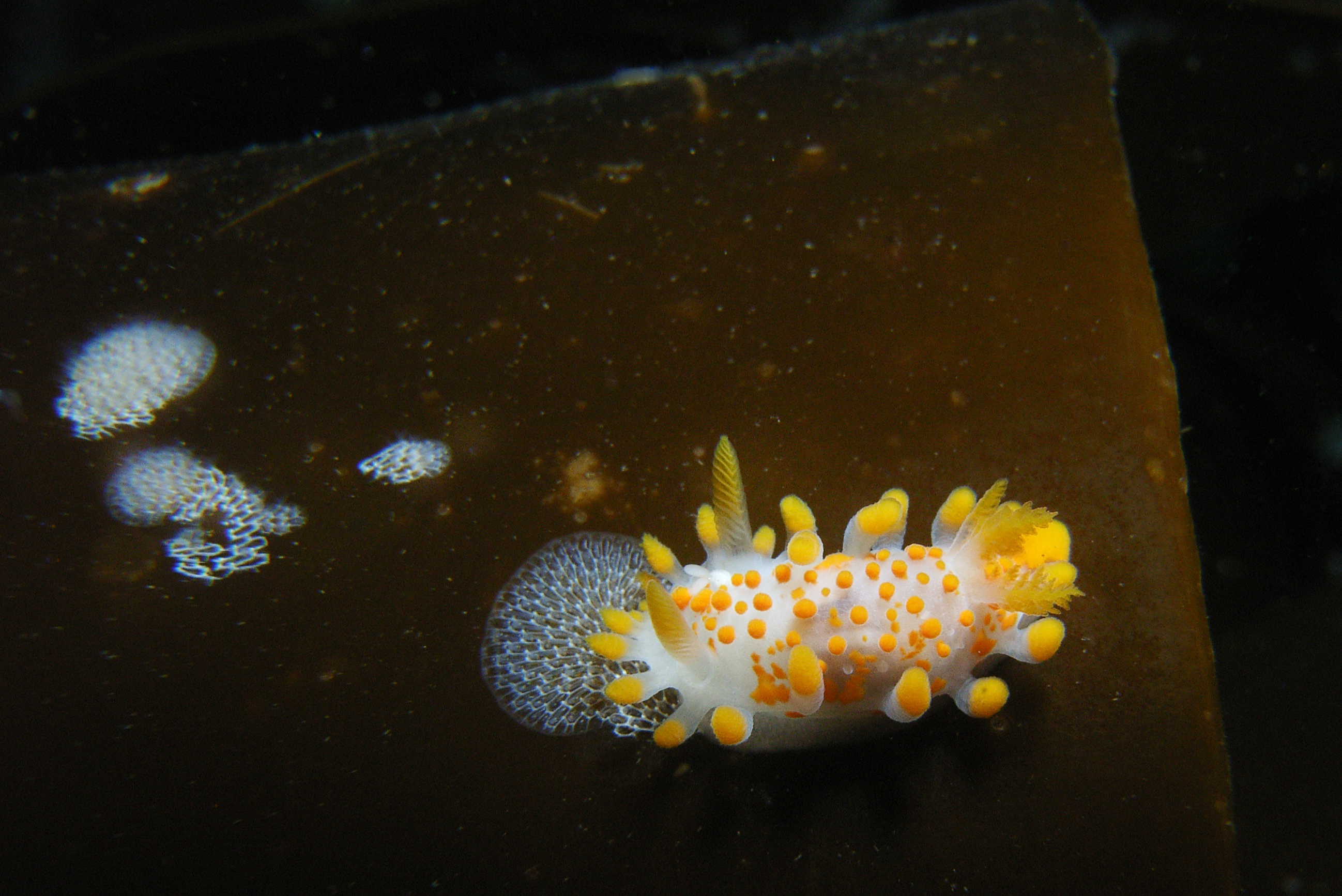
- Limacia clavigera grazing on the bryozoan Membranipora membranacea

Scientific classification
- Kingdom: Animalia
- Phylum: Mollusca
- Class: Gastropoda
- Order: Nudibranchia
- Family: Polyceridae
- Subfamily: Triophinae
- Genus: Limacia; Muller, 1781

Synonyms
- Euphurus Rafinesque, 1815; Laila MacFarland, 1905

= Limacia =

Genus of gastropods

Limacia is a genus of sea slugs, dorid nudibranchs, marine gastropod molluscs in the family Polyceridae.

== Species ==
Species within the genus Limacia include:

- Limacia annulata Vallès, Valdés & Ortea, 2000
- Limacia antofagastensis Uribe, Sepúlveda, Goddard & Valdés, 2017
- Limacia clavigera (O. F. Müller, 1776)
- Limacia cockerelli (MacFarland, 1905)
- Limacia iberica Caballer Gutiérrez, Almón Pazos, Pérez Dieste, 2015
- Limacia inesae Toms, Pola, Von der Heyden & Gosliner, 2021
- Limacia janssi (Bertsch & Ferreira, 1974)
- Limacia jellyi Toms, Pola, Von der Heyden & Gosliner, 2021
- Limacia langavi Toms, Pola, Von der Heyden & Gosliner, 2021
- Limacia lucida (Stimpson, 1854)
- Limacia mcdonaldi Uribe, Sepúlveda, Goddard & Valdés, 2017
- Limacia miali Toms, Pola, Von der Heyden & Gosliner, 2021
- Limacia ornata (Baba, 1937)
