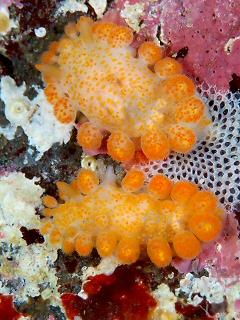

Scientific classification
- Kingdom: Animalia
- Phylum: Mollusca
- Class: Gastropoda
- Order: Nudibranchia
- Family: Polyceridae
- Genus: Limacia
- Species: L. ornata

Binomial name
- Limacia ornata (Baba, 1937)

= Limacia ornata =

Species of gastropod

Limacia ornata, is a sea slug, a species of dorid nudibranch. It is a marine gastropod mollusc in the family Polyceridae.

== Distribution ==
Limacia ornata was described from Japan. It has been reported from Sydney, Australia. A similar animal from Western Australia may be a different species.
