= Sinoflustridae =

Scientific classification
- Domain: Eukaryota
- Kingdom: Animalia
- Phylum: Bryozoa
- Class: Gymnolaemata
- Order: Cheilostomatida
- Family: Sinoflustridae

Family of bryozoans

Sinoflustridae is a family of bryozoans belonging to the order Cheilostomatida.

Genera:

- Membraniporopsis Liu, 1999
- Sinoflustra Liu & Yang, 1995
