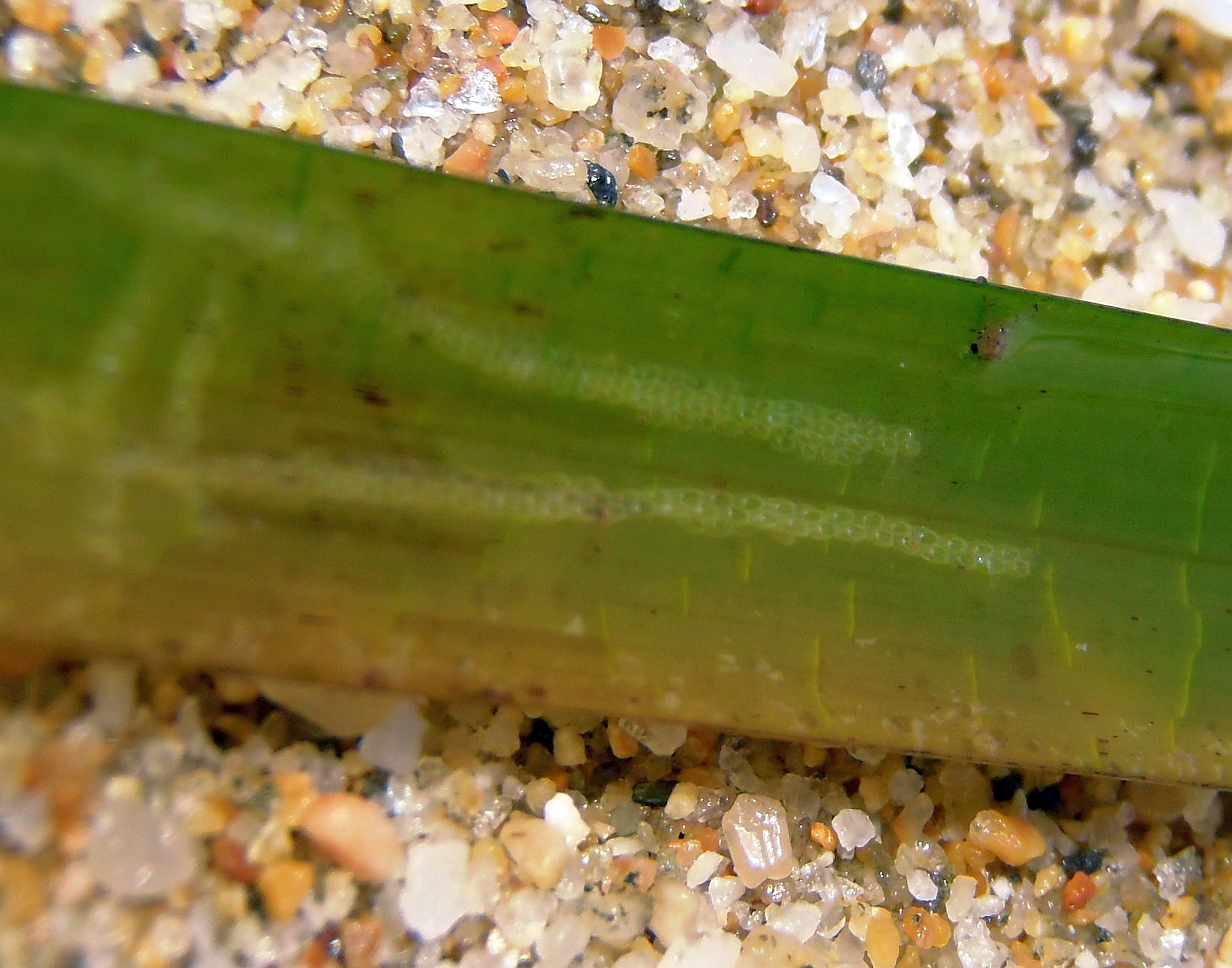
- Electra posidoniae on Posidonia oceanica, Sardinia, Italy

Scientific classification
- Domain: Eukaryota
- Kingdom: Animalia
- Phylum: Bryozoa
- Class: Gymnolaemata
- Order: Cheilostomatida
- Suborder: Malacostegina; Levinsen, 1902

= Malacostegina =

Malacostegina Temporal range: Late Jurassic–Recent

Order of moss animals

Malacostegina is a sub-order of marine, colonial bryozoans in the order Cheilostomatida. The structure of the individual zooids is generally simple, with an uncalcified, flexible frontal wall. This sub-order includes the earliest known cheilostome, in the genus Pyriporopsis (Electridae).

The genus Christinella is currently incertae sedis within the Malacostegina.
