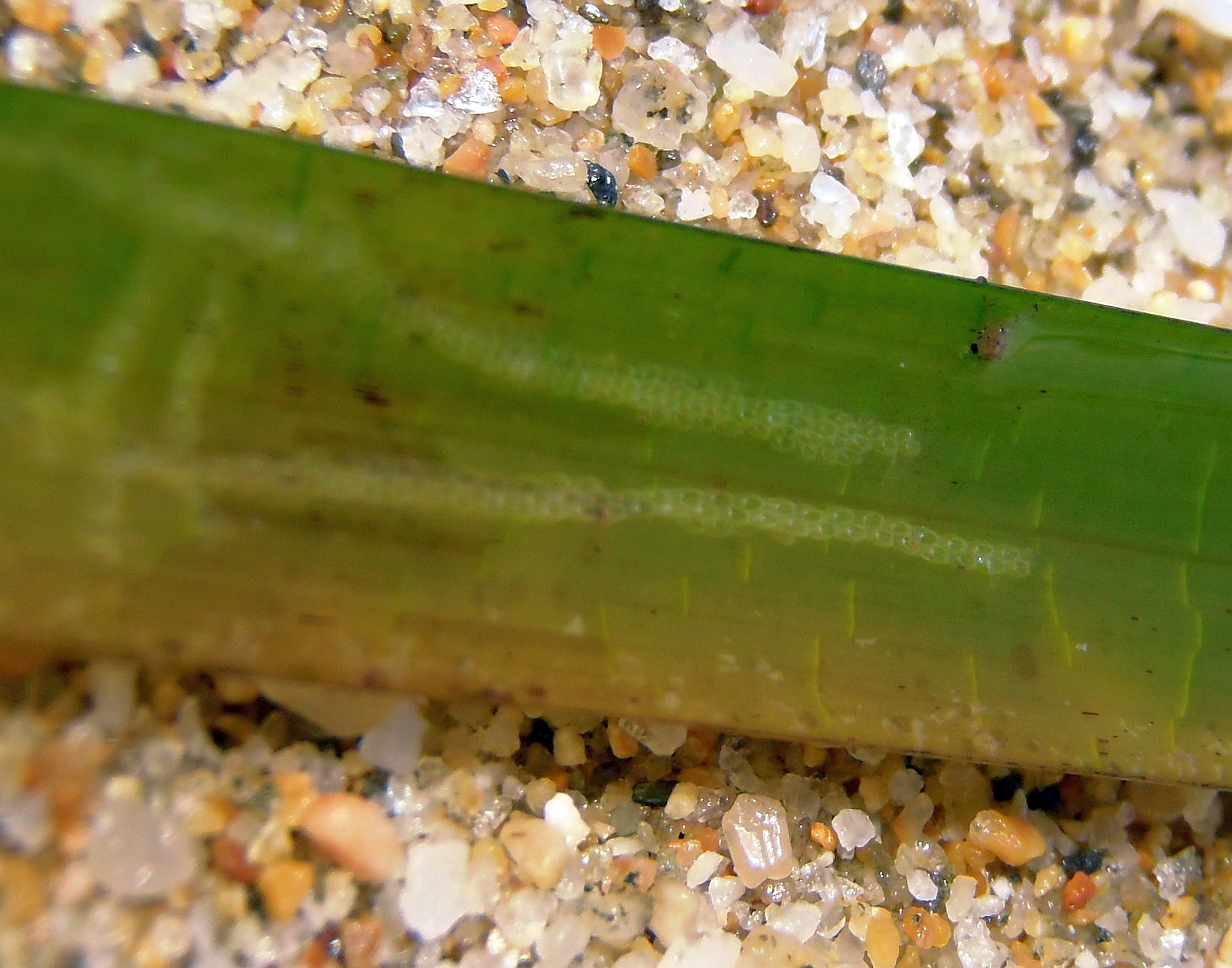
- Electra posidoniae on Posidonia oceanica, Sardinia, Italy

Scientific classification
- Kingdom: Animalia
- Phylum: Bryozoa
- Class: Gymnolaemata
- Order: Cheilostomatida
- Suborder: Malacostegina
- Family: Electridae d'Orbigny, 1851

= Electridae =

Family of moss animals

Electridae is a family of bryozoans in the order Cheilostomatida.

== Genera ==
The World Register of Marine Species lists the following genera:

- Arbocuspis Nikulina, 2010
- Arbopercula Nikulina, 2010
- Aspidelectra Levinsen, 1909
- Bathypora MacGillivray, 1885
- Charixa Lang, 1915
- Conopeum Gray, 1848
  - Conopeum seurati
- Einhornia Nikulina, 2007
- Electra Lamouroux, 1816
  - Electra pilosa
  - Electra posidoniae
- Gontarella Grischenko, Taylor & Mawatari, 2002
- Harpecia Gordon, 1982
- Lapidosella Gontar, 2010
- Mychoplectra Gordon & Parker, 1991
- Osburnea Nikulina, 2010
- Pyripora d'Orbigny, 1849
- Tarsocryptus Tilbrook, 2011
- Villicharixa Gordon, 1989
