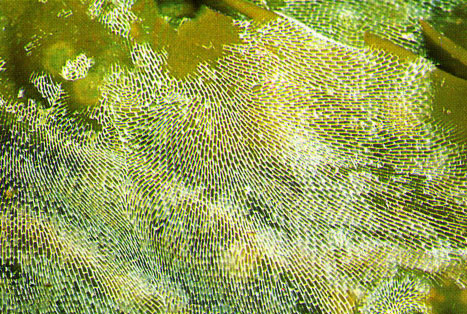
- M. membranacea

Scientific classification
- Kingdom: Animalia
- Phylum: Bryozoa
- Class: Gymnolaemata
- Order: Cheilostomatida
- Family: Membraniporidae
- Genus: Membranipora de Blainville, 1830

= Membranipora =

Genus of moss animals

Membranipora is a genus of bryozoans in the family Membraniporidae. A typical example is the widely distributed species Membranipora membranacea that commonly encrusts seaweeds, particularly fronds of the kelps Laminaria digitata, L. hyperborea, and Saccorhiza polyschides.

Colonies of M. membranacea show different forms of polyphenism as spines, tower zooids, chimneys and stolons.

== Reproduction ==
The eggs of M. membranipora develop into planktonic cyphonautes larvae which is strongly triangular in outline and about 850μm x 600μm big.

== Species ==
Species:

- Membranipora aborescens
- Membranipora aculeata (d'Orbigny, 1852)
- Membranipora acuminata Levinsen, 1925
- Membranipora acuum Brydone, 1929
- Membranipora aedificata Brydone, 1913
- Membranipora aequalis (d'Orbigny, 1852)
- Membranipora aftonensis Brydone, 1929
- Membranipora aftonia Brydone, 1929
- Membranipora albensis Brydone, 1929
- Membranipora albida Brydone, 1929
- Membranipora allita (d'Orbigny, 1852)
- Membranipora almerai Canu, 1913
- Membranipora alveolus Brydone, 1929
- Membranipora ambigua Allegre, 1939
- Membranipora ameghinoi Canu, 1908
- Membranipora americana (d'Orbigny, 1853)
- Membranipora ampla (Uttley, 1951)
- Membranipora ancarteri Brown, 1958
- Membranipora angulosa d'Orbigny, 1853
- Membranipora aperta Busk, 1859
- Membranipora aperta Levinsen, 1925
- Membranipora arborea Canu, 1911
- Membranipora arcana Brydone, 1929
- Membranipora arcana Canu & Bassler, 1920
- Membranipora arcifera Canu & Bassler, 1929
- Membranipora arctica (d'Orbigny, 1853)
- Membranipora arenulata (Lamarck, 1816)
- Membranipora areolata Canu & Bassler, 1935
- Membranipora argus (d'Orbigny, 1852)
- Membranipora artini Canu, 1904
- Membranipora atabekjani Voigt, 1967
- Membranipora aviculifera Maplestone, 1901
- Membranipora baccata Canu & Bassler, 1923
- Membranipora baculina (d'Orbigny, 1852)
- Membranipora bellis Maplestone, 1901
- Membranipora bemensis Brydone, 1929
- Membranipora benjamini (Canu & Bassler, 1917)
- Membranipora berthelseni Jürgensen, 1968
- Membranipora biarritziana Canu, 1912
- Membranipora bifoliata Ulrich & Bassler, 1904
- Membranipora bioculata Canu, 1904
- Membranipora bipunctata Schafhautl, 1863
- Membranipora bispinosa Levinsen, 1907
- Membranipora boulei Canu, 1900
- Membranipora bramensis Brydone, 1929
- Membranipora branscombensis Brydone, 1929
- Membranipora bruennichi Voigt, 1930
- Membranipora brunnea Hutton, 1873
- Membranipora bueltenensis Voigt, 1930
- Membranipora bulbillifera Canu, 1908
- Membranipora californica Gabb & Horn, 1862
- Membranipora calveti Canu, 1911
- Membranipora camillae Neviani, 1895
- Membranipora caminosa Ulrich & Bassler, 1904
- Membranipora canalifera Canu & Bassler, 1920
- Membranipora canui Dartevelle, 1933
- Membranipora canui Lecointre, 1912
- Membranipora capillimargo Canu, 1911
- Membranipora cauveri Guha & Nathan, 1996
- Membranipora cavernifera Voigt, 1962
- Membranipora celsospinata Voigt, 1930
- Membranipora cenomana (d'Orbigny, 1852)
- Membranipora cervicornis Brydone, 1913
- Membranipora chyngtonensis Brydone, 1929
- Membranipora cingulata Levinsen, 1925
- Membranipora claudata Canu, 1911
- Membranipora clavicella Voigt, 1930
- Membranipora claviformis Canu & Bassler, 1920
- Membranipora clio d'Orbigny, 1853
- Membranipora cochlearis MacGillivray, 1895
- Membranipora combesi Canu, 1907
- Membranipora commixta Voigt, 1930
- Membranipora complanata (d'Orbigny, 1853)
- Membranipora composita Koschinsky, 1885
- Membranipora conficiens Brydone, 1929
- Membranipora contexta Canu, 1911
- Membranipora contracta Voigt, 1930
- Membranipora convexa (d'Orbigny, 1852)
- Membranipora coronata Levinsen, 1925
- Membranipora crassimargo Canu & Bassler, 1926
- Membranipora crespinae Brown, 1958
- Membranipora cristallina Canu, 1908
- Membranipora cubitalis Brydone, 1916
- Membranipora cuckmerensis Brydone, 1929
- Membranipora cuculligera Brydone, 1914
- Membranipora cyclopora (d'Orbigny, 1852)
- Membranipora cyclostoma MacGillivray, 1895
- Membranipora deborahae Brown, 1952
- Membranipora declivis Marsson, 1887
- Membranipora dennanti Maplestone, 1900
- Membranipora dimorphocella Canu, 1919
- Membranipora disjuncta Gregory, 1894
- Membranipora distefanoi Cipolla, 1932
- Membranipora dolina Brydone, 1929
- Membranipora dorbignyana Canu, 1900
- Membranipora dubia Busk, 1859
- Membranipora dugossonei Pergens, 1892
- Membranipora dutertrei Duvergier, 1924
- Membranipora duvergieriae Vigneaux, 1949
- Membranipora eastonensis Brydone, 1929
- Membranipora ebeidii Abbas & El-Senoussi, 1979
- Membranipora echinata d'Orbigny, 1842
- Membranipora eleanorae Brydone, 1936
- Membranipora elizabethiensis Waters, 1898
- Membranipora elliptica von Hagenow, 1839
- Membranipora endozooecialis Voigt, 1930
- Membranipora eocena (Busk, 1866)
- Membranipora evanescens Voigt, 1967
- Membranipora excavata Canu, 1904
- Membranipora falloti Canu, 1908
- Membranipora famelica Brydone, 1929
- Membranipora fannia Brydone, 1916
- Membranipora fascelis Brydone, 1916
- Membranipora fastigii Brydone, 1929
- Membranipora faustina Brydone, 1916
- Membranipora faviola Brydone, 1929
- Membranipora fecampensis Brydone, 1929
- Membranipora fenestralis Brydone, 1929
- Membranipora fenestrella (d'Orbigny, 1852)
- Membranipora fissura Seguenza, 1880
- Membranipora fistula Ulrich & Bassler, 1904
- Membranipora flabellata (d'Orbigny, 1852)
- Membranipora flabellata Canu, 1904
- Membranipora flicki Canu, 1904
- Membranipora fluonia Brydone, 1916
- Membranipora fonteia Brydone, 1916
- Membranipora fornicina (Lamarck, 1816)
- Membranipora fossata Levinsen, 1907
- Membranipora fossulifera Ulrich & Bassler, 1904
- Membranipora frontalis Levinsen, 1925
- Membranipora fulcra Brydone, 1929
- Membranipora galeria Brydone, 1929
- Membranipora galvia Brydone, 1929
- Membranipora gardiana Canu, 1911
- Membranipora gentili Canu, 1903
- Membranipora gerana Brydone, 1929
- Membranipora germana Ulrich & Bassler, 1904
- Membranipora gharanensis El Safori & El-Sorogy, 1999
- Membranipora gigantea Levinsen, 1925
- Membranipora gigantissima Lecointre, 1912
- Membranipora girondina (d'Orbigny, 1852)
- Membranipora globulosa Maplestone, 1901
- Membranipora granti (von Hagenow, 1851)
- Membranipora gravensis Brydone, 1913
- Membranipora harmeri Canu, 1907
- Membranipora hastingi Marc.
- Membranipora hebens Brydone, 1929
- Membranipora hennei (Nyst, 1843)
- Membranipora heterospinosa Kluge, 1908
- Membranipora hexagona
- Membranipora hursleiensis Brydone, 1929
- Membranipora hyadesi Jullien, 1888
- Membranipora impolita Mokrinskij, 1916
- Membranipora impressa Levinsen, 1925
- Membranipora impressata Canu, 1911
- Membranipora inaequalis (d'Orbigny, 1852)
- Membranipora incurvata Maplestone, 1900
- Membranipora inornata Hincks, 1881
- Membranipora insultans Brydone, 1929
- Membranipora intricata (Lonsdale, 1850)
- Membranipora irregularis (d'Orbigny, 1853)
- Membranipora isabelleana (d'Orbigny, 1842)
- Membranipora kayeum Guha & Nathan, 1996
- Membranipora kiowana Scott, 1970
- Membranipora kischenewensis (Pheophanova, 1953)
- Membranipora krimskojensis Voigt, 1962
- Membranipora lacrymopora (d'Orbigny, 1852)
- Membranipora laevigata Canu, 1904
- Membranipora laevissima Maplestone, 1911
- Membranipora lata Canu & Bassler, 1929
- Membranipora leo (Pheophanova, 1953)
- Membranipora ligeriensis (d'Orbigny, 1852)
- Membranipora ligulata Maplestone, 1901
- Membranipora limbata (d'Orbigny, 1852)
- Membranipora limburgensis Voigt, 1930
- Membranipora longifissa Voigt, 1930
- Membranipora longipes Maplestone, 1901
- Membranipora maastrichtensis Voigt, 1924
- Membranipora magnispina Levinsen, 1925
- Membranipora malaccensis d'Orbigny, 1853
- Membranipora mamillaris (d'Orbigny, 1852)
- Membranipora mamillifera Voigt, 1962
- Membranipora maplestonei Canu, 1911
- Membranipora margaritifera Voigt, 1967
- Membranipora marssoni Canu, 1900
- Membranipora marssoniana Voigt, 1924
- Membranipora maxima Levinsen, 1925
- Membranipora meandrina (d'Orbigny, 1852)
- Membranipora megapora d'Orbigny, 1850
- Membranipora membranacea (Linnaeus, 1767)
- Membranipora meunieri Canu, 1900
- Membranipora meunieri Canu, 1909
- Membranipora minuscula Canu, 1911
- Membranipora morningtoniensis Maplestone, 1900
- Membranipora munda (Marsson, 1887)
- Membranipora nanula Brydone, 1929
- Membranipora nellioides Canu & Bassler, 1933
- Membranipora nellioides Voigt, 1930
- Membranipora nicklesi Lecointre, 1912
- Membranipora nitidula Ulrich & Bassler, 1904
- Membranipora nobilis Reuss, 1848
- Membranipora nordgaardiana Canu, 1911
- Membranipora operculata Hincks, 1886
- Membranipora orbavicularia Voigt, 1930
- Membranipora orlowi Voigt, 1967
- Membranipora ornata (Busk, 1854)
- Membranipora osburni Canu & Bassler, 1923
- Membranipora ossuaria Brydone, 1929
- Membranipora ovalis (d'Orbigny, 1852)
- Membranipora ovata (Canu & Lecointre, 1925)
- Membranipora ovifera Maplestone, 1911
- Membranipora ovigera Levinsen, 1925
- Membranipora pachundakii Canu, 1912
- Membranipora pachytheca Osburn, 1950
- Membranipora pallaryi Canu, 1900
- Membranipora palpebra Brydone, 1929
- Membranipora papyracea MacGillivray, 1895
- Membranipora parvicella Canu, 1919
- Membranipora parvula (von Hagenow, 1839)
- Membranipora patellaris Reuss, 1872
- Membranipora paucispinata Voigt, 1930
- Membranipora pegma Brown, 1958
- Membranipora pererrans Brydone, 1929
- Membranipora perincerta Brydone, 1936
- Membranipora perspicata Brydone, 1929
- Membranipora pertenera Brydone, 1929
- Membranipora pervinquierei Canu, 1903
- Membranipora philostracites Michelin, 1845
- Membranipora plebicola Brydone, 1929
- Membranipora plicatella Brydone, 1913
- Membranipora plicatelloides Berthelsen, 1962
- Membranipora pollex Brydone, 1929
- Membranipora polystachys Kluge, 1914
- Membranipora pontpourqueyensis Vigneaux, 1949
- Membranipora portus Brydone, 1929
- Membranipora praetermissa Brydone, 1929
- Membranipora pratensis Neviani, 1901
- Membranipora princeps Hincks, 1880
- Membranipora proboscinoides Voigt, 1967
- Membranipora procurrens Brydone, 1929
- Membranipora pseudelea Voigt, 1930
- Membranipora pseudonormaniana Chiplonkar, 1939
- Membranipora pudica Brydone, 1929
- Membranipora pulchella (Canu & Bassler, 1930)
- Membranipora pygmaea (d'Orbigny, 1852)
- Membranipora pyriformis Canu, 1908
- Membranipora pyropersiata Lecointre, 1912
- Membranipora quadrata Canu, 1904
- Membranipora quadrata Voigt, 1930
- Membranipora quadrifascialis Canu, 1912
- Membranipora ravni Voigt, 1930
- Membranipora raymondi Hayami, 1975
- Membranipora regularis Namias, 1891
- Membranipora reticularis (Lamarck, 1816)
- Membranipora reyti Canu, 1909
- Membranipora rimulata Ulrich, 1901
- Membranipora roemeri (Lonsdale, 1850)
- Membranipora rotundicella Canu, 1904
- Membranipora royana (d'Orbigny, 1852)
- Membranipora rupensis Brydone, 1929
- Membranipora rustica Florence, Hayward & Gibbons, 2007
- Membranipora sandalina Brydone, 1918
- Membranipora santonensis (d'Orbigny, 1853)
- Membranipora scanica Voigt, 1930
- Membranipora scotneiensis Brydone, 1929
- Membranipora seafordensis Brydone, 1918
- Membranipora securigera Levinsen, 1925
- Membranipora selandica Berthelsen, 1962
- Membranipora semilunaris Levinsen, 1925
