= Limacia janssi =

Scientific classification
- Kingdom: Animalia
- Phylum: Mollusca
- Class: Gastropoda
- Order: Nudibranchia
- Family: Polyceridae
- Genus: Limacia
- Species: L. janssi

Binomial name
- Limacia janssi (Bertsch & Ferreira, 1974)

Species of gastropod

Limacia janssi is a sea slug, a species of dorid nudibranch. It is a marine gastropod mollusc in the family Polyceridae.

== Distribution ==
Limacia janssi was described from Bahia Santa Elena, 10°56′N 85°49′W, Guanacaste, Costa Rica. Additional specimens from Isla Partida, 24°33′N 110°24′W, Gulf of California, Mexico were included in the original description. It has also been reported from Isla San Pedro Mártir, Gulf of California.
