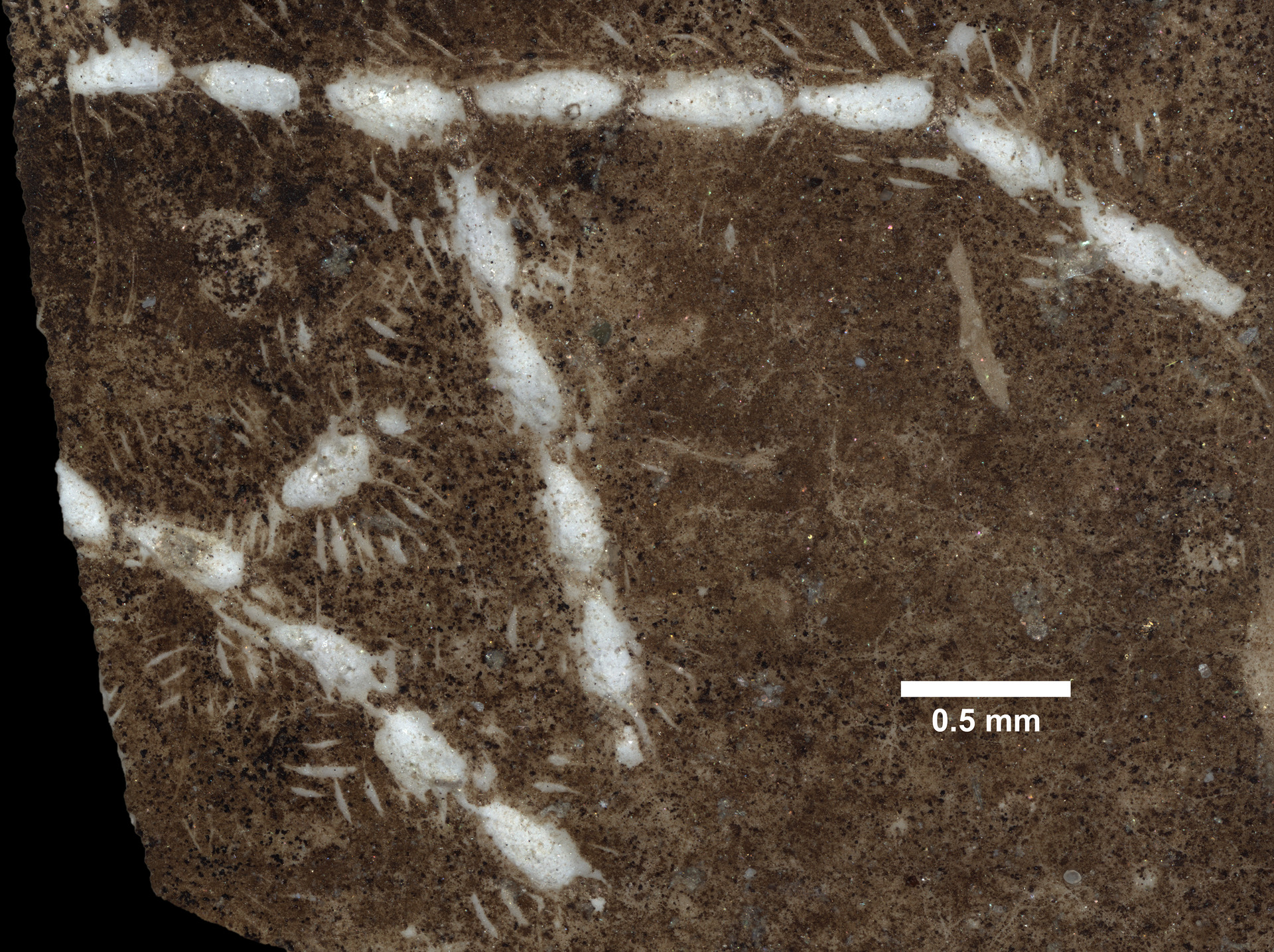
- Pyripora

Scientific classification
- Domain: Eukaryota
- Kingdom: Animalia
- Phylum: Bryozoa
- Class: Gymnolaemata
- Order: Cheilostomatida
- Family: Electridae
- Genus: Pyripora d'Orbigny, 1849

= Pyripora =

Genus of aquatic invertebrates

Pyripora is a genus of bryozoans belonging to the family Electridae.

The genus has almost cosmopolitan distribution.

Species:

- Pyripora brevicauda Canu & Bassler, 1923
- Pyripora catenularia (Fleming, 1828)
