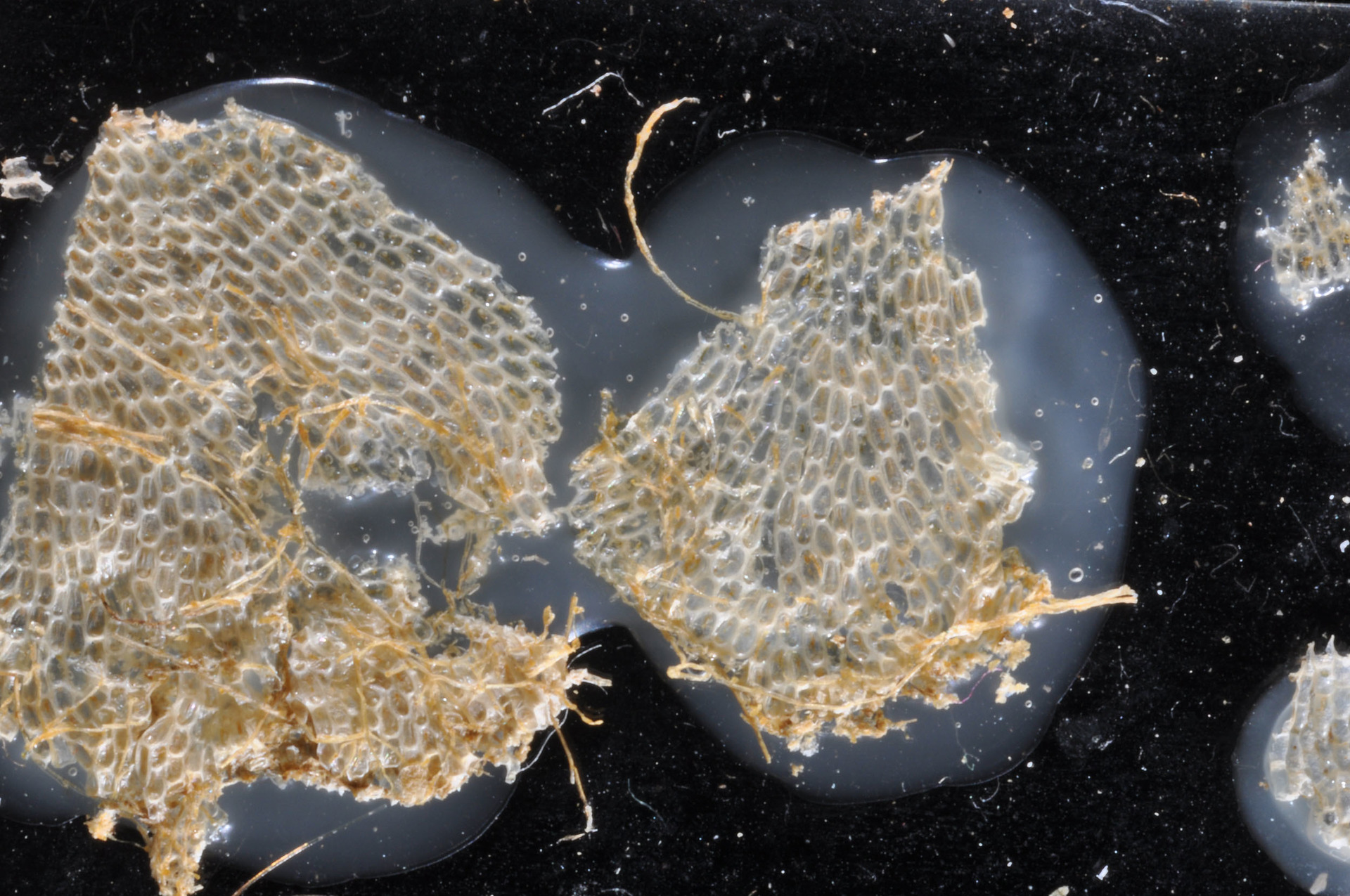
- Conopeum reticulum

Scientific classification
- Kingdom: Animalia
- Phylum: Bryozoa
- Class: Gymnolaemata
- Order: Cheilostomatida
- Family: Electridae
- Genus: Conopeum; Gray, 1848

= Conopeum =

Conopeum Temporal range: Albian–present, 105.3–0 Ma

Genus of aquatic invertebrates

Conopeum is a genus of marine and brackish water bryozoans belonging to the family Electridae. The genus has cosmopolitan distribution.

== Species ==
There are 19 extant species:

- Conopeum aciculatum (MacGillivray, 1891)
- Conopeum antipodum Gordon, Sutherland, Perez, Waeschenbach, Taylor & Di Martino, 2020
- Conopeum chesapeakensis (Banta, Perez & Santagata, 1995)
- Conopeum commensale Kirkpatrick & Metzelaar, 1922
- Conopeum eriophorum (Lamouroux, 1816)
- Conopeum fluviatilis (Canu, 1928)
- Conopeum grimmi Gontar & Tarasov, 2009
- Conopeum lacroixii (Audouin, 1826)
- Conopeum loki Almeida, Souza & Vieira, 2017
- Conopeum nakanosum Grischenko, Dick & Mawatari, 2007
- Conopeum osburni Soule, Soule & Chaney, 1995
- Conopeum papillorum Tilbrook, Hayward & Gordon, 2001
- Conopeum reticulum (Linnaeus, 1767)
- Conopeum seurati (Canu, 1928)
- Conopeum spiculata (Canu, 1928)
- Conopeum tenuissimum (Canu, 1908)
- Conopeum ponticum Hayward, 2001
- Conopeum truitti Osburn, 1944
- Conopeum vivianii Moyano, 1991

In addition, there is a large number of species known only from the fossil record.
