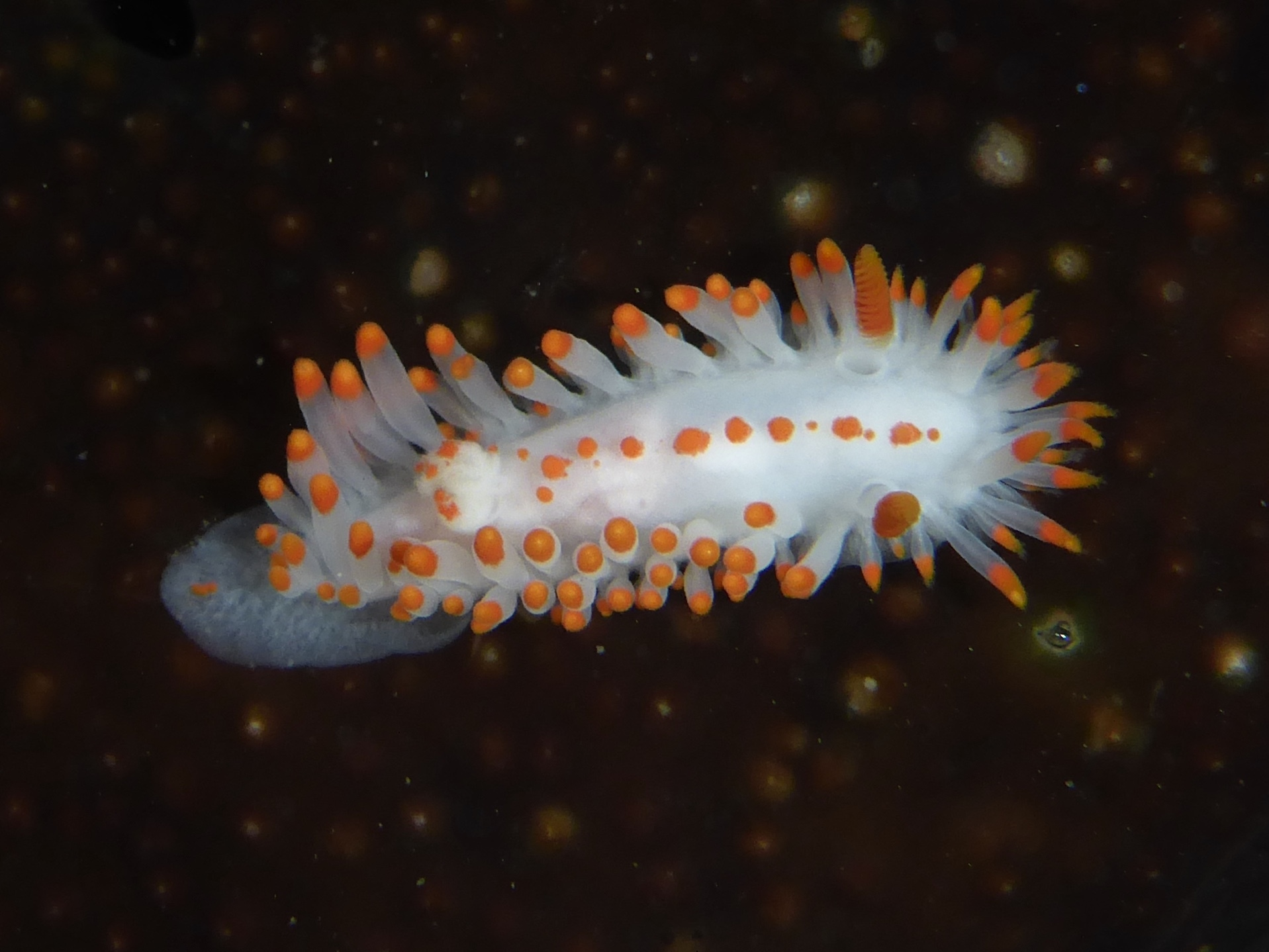

Scientific classification
- Kingdom: Animalia
- Phylum: Mollusca
- Class: Gastropoda
- Order: Nudibranchia
- Family: Polyceridae
- Genus: Limacia
- Species: L. mcdonaldi

Binomial name
- Limacia mcdonaldi Uribe, Sepúlveda, Goddard & Valdés, 2017

= Limacia mcdonaldi =

Species of gastropod

Limacia mcdonaldi, or McDonald's dorid, is a species of nudibranch native to the coast of California. It grows up to 26 mm in length and was previously confused with Limacia cockerelli from which it is easily differentiated by the row of orange spots down the centre of the back. It was named in honor of nudibranch expert Gary McDonald.

== Description ==
The possibility of Limacia cockerelli being two or more species was discussed frequently by observers before this species was described in 2017. They were distinguished as the red form and orange form (= L. mcdonaldi) by the color of the rhinophores and gills.

== Distribution ==
The type locality for this species is White's Point, Palos Verdes, California. It ranges from Salt Point in Sonoma County to Bahia de los Angeles, Baja California. Its range overlaps with Limacia cockerelli over nearly 850 km of the coast of California between San Diego and Salt Point. From 2014 to 2016 it became quite common in the Monterey Bay and San Francisco areas coinciding with elevated sea water temperatures at that time due to an El Niño event.
