= Charixa =

Scientific classification
- Domain: Eukaryota
- Kingdom: Animalia
- Phylum: Bryozoa
- Class: Gymnolaemata
- Order: Cheilostomatida
- Family: Electridae
- Genus: Charixa; Lang, 1915

Genus of aquatic invertebrates

Charixa is a genus of bryozoans belonging to the family Electridae.

Extant species of this genus are found in Northern America.

Species:

- Charixa bispinata Martha, Taylor & Rader, 2019
- Charixa burdonaria Taylor, Lazo & Aguirre-Urreta, 2008
- Charixa lhuydi (Pitt, 1976) (fossil, Cretaceous of England)
