= Cyphonautes =

Larva of an ectoproct or bryozoan

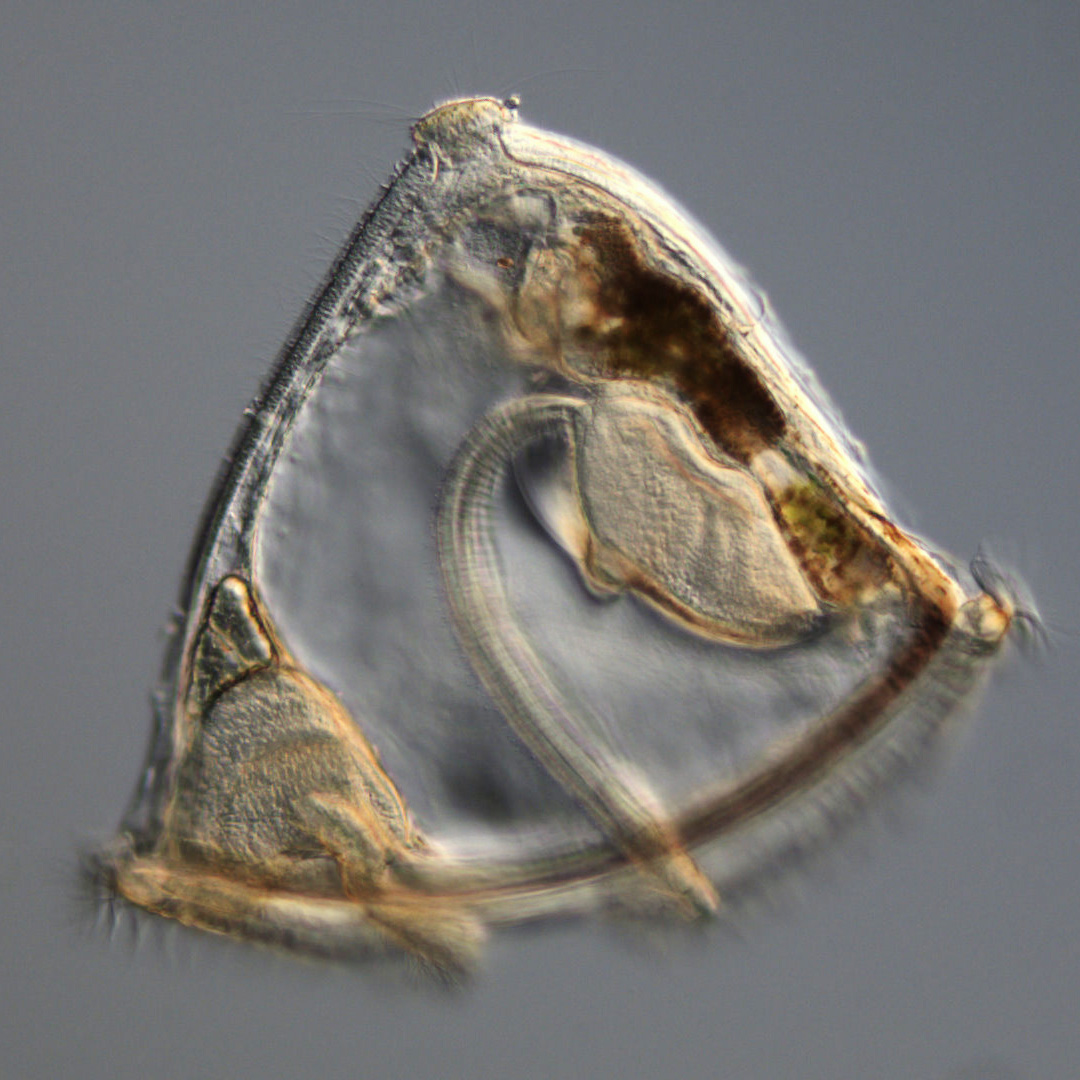
A wild-caught cyphonautes, likely of Membranipora, from a plankton sample taken in Coos Bay, Oregon

A cyphonautes is a larva of an ectoproct or bryozoan. It is triangular in profile with a heavily ciliated band called the corona at the base of the triangle and a sense organ at the apex (cypho-, bent; nautes, sailor). The beating of coronal cilia propels the cyphonautes through the water and contributes to a feeding current. The cyphonautes is very thin, i.e. laterally compressed, and is bounded laterally by two valves or shell plates. The internal anatomy of the archetypical cyphonautes, such as the one featured in the life cycles of Membranipora, includes a complete digestive tract with a stomach entrance near the apex and a hindgut ending in an anus near one end of the base. At the other end of the triangle's base is the pyriform organ, a heavily ciliated and glandular complex that functions in site selection at settlement.

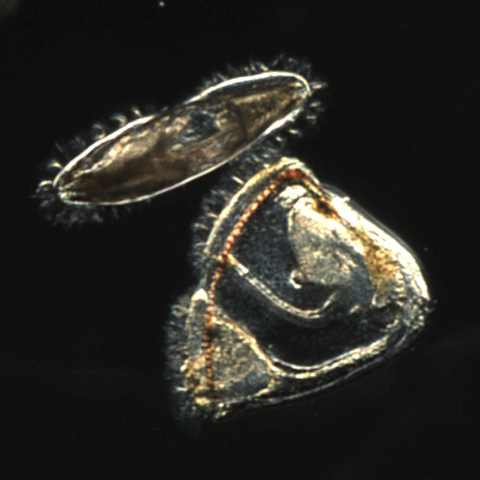
Two cyphonautes, one in side view and the other apical view, illustrating the extent of lateral compression

Much of the internal space in the cyphonautes is devoted to a funnel that, in Membranipora's long-lived feeding cyphonautes, is divided by a pair of ciliated ridges into inhalant and exhalant chambers. The ciliated ridges drive a water current that circulates through the funnel. Ridge cilia undergo transient reversals as prey items are detected in the passing stream. Another set of ridge cilia are stationary and create a sieve across the narrow slit between the paired ridges. A third set of ridge cilia create a current toward the stomach entrance, assisted by cilia along the funnel walls. These combined actions collect unicellular algae and other particles from the plankton. Muscles connected to the valves can quickly narrow the slender aperture at the base of the triangle, expelling most of the fluid volume in a sort of a sneeze that can flush undesirable material that enters the funnel. Combined with the action of long muscle fibers connected to the apical organ and corona, the entire body can transiently collapse between the valves.

In feeding cyphonautes such as Membranipora's, rudiments of the adult body are not apparent in young larvae. After substantial growth, an internal sac of undifferentiated tissue forms between the stomach and the wall of the exhalant chamber. In competent larvae the internal sac is the largest single organ in the body, and becomes quite convoluted. Once the cyphonautes selects a settlement site, metamorphosis begins with the rapid collapse of the triangle: the valves are pulled flat against the substrate and the internal sac spreads out beneath them. The corona and other larval organs are resorbed. In Membranipora, two zoids develop initially from the internal sac of a single settled cyphonautes.

The relationship of the cyphonautes to other larval forms, either amongst the bryozoans or in related phyla, is a matter of debate. Because the cyphonautes features in the life cycles of some members in both the ctenostome and cheilostome bryozoans, it is inferred to be ancestral to the phylum. This leads to the inference that the many non-feeding coronate larvae must be derived by simplification of the cyphonautes, as sketched by Zimmer and Woollacott. Nielsen has pointed out many similarities between the cyphonautes and the larvae of entoprocts, thereby supporting an argument that these animals are the sister phylum to the ectoprocts. Jägerston argued that resemblances between the cyphonautes and the actinotrocha larva of a phoronid seems to show a relationship between them, sketching an outline deriving the latter from the former; Farmer, however, pointed out the proposed evolutionary sequence could go either way. As long as the phylogenetic placement of bryozoans remains unsettled these scenarios remain ambiguous.
