= Pseudoplankton =

Marine organism

Pseudoplanktonic organisms are those that attach themselves to planktonic organisms or other floating objects, such as drifting wood, buoyant shells of organisms such as Spirula, or man-made flotsam. Examples include goose barnacles and the bryozoan Jellyella. By themselves these animals cannot float, which contrasts them with true planktonic organisms, such as Velella and the Portuguese Man o' War, which are buoyant. Pseudoplankton are often found in the guts of filtering zooplankters.
