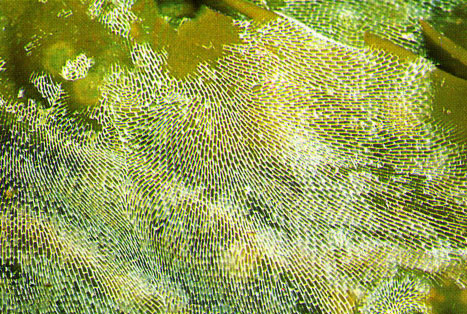
- Membranipora membranacea

Scientific classification
- Kingdom: Animalia
- Phylum: Bryozoa
- Class: Gymnolaemata
- Order: Cheilostomatida
- Suborder: Malacostegina
- Family: Membraniporidae; Busk, 1854

Genera
- Biflustra; Jellyella; Membranipora

= Membraniporidae =

Family of moss animals

Membraniporidae is a bryozoan family in the order Cheilostomatida. Membranipora form encrusting or erect colonies; they are unilaminar or bilaminar and weakly to well-calcified. Zooids have vertical and basal calcified walls, but virtually no frontal calcified wall: most of the frontal surface is occupied by frontal membrane. An intertentacular organ is also present. The larvae are not brooded. The ancestrula is generally twinned. Kenozooids may be present in a few species; modified zooids analogous to avicularia are rare.
