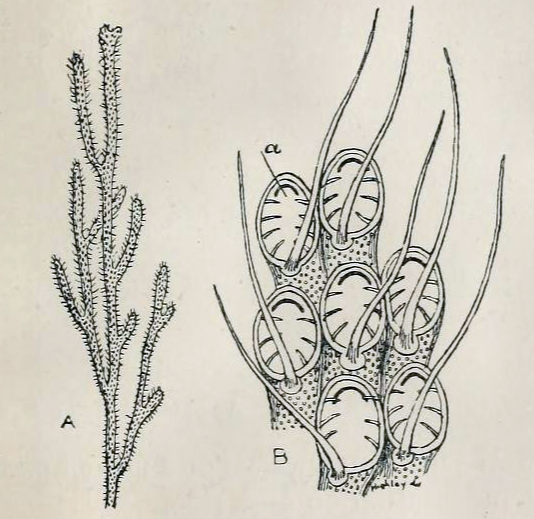

Scientific classification
- Kingdom: Animalia
- Phylum: Bryozoa
- Class: Gymnolaemata
- Order: Cheilostomatida
- Family: Electridae
- Genus: Electra
- Species: E. pilosa

Binomial name
- Electra pilosa (Linnaeus, 1767)

= Electra pilosa =

Species of moss animal

Electra pilosa is a species of colonial bryozoan in the order Cheilostomatida. It is native to the northeastern and northwestern Atlantic Ocean and is also present in Australia and New Zealand.

== Description ==
Colonies of Electra pilosa form broad mats or star-shaped patches on the surface of the fronds of large algae such as Laminaria and Fucus serratus. The zooids also grows in small patches or tufts on the surface of shells and stones, and encircling the fronds of red algae such as Mastocarpus stellatus. The zooids are packed closely together, are cylindrical and about 0.5 by 0.3 mm (0.020 by 0.012 in). Each one has a mineralized exoskeleton with a transparent, membranous oval window. The calcified protective covering bears about nine spines (four to twelve), the central one being much longer than the others, giving the colony a hairy (Latin pilosa) appearance.

== Distribution ==
Electra pilosa is native to the northeastern and the northwestern Atlantic Ocean, the Mediterranean Sea, the North Sea, the Wadden Sea, the White Sea and the Barents Sea. It is also present in Australia and New Zealand where it is regarded as an introduced species. It is found from the intertidal zone of sheltered rocky shores down to depths of about 50 m (164 ft).

== Biology ==
A colony starts when a larva settles on a suitable surface and undergoes metamorphosis into an ancestrula. This forms daughter zooids by budding and the colony grows by asexual reproduction. In common with other bryozoans, Electra pilosa filter feeds with the aid of a crown of tentacles known as a lophophore with which it sieves particles from the water. It probably feeds on such things as flagellates, phytoplankton, bacteria, small pieces of algal debris and algal spores. The spines on the exoskeleton, especially the long one, offer protection to the zooid when it is feeding and may grow longer in colonies facing competition from other bryozoans. The growth rate of the zooids varies with the water flow, the temperature, the food supply and the competition from other bryozoan colonies.

The colony is hermaphrodite but individual zooids are either male or female. In Britain, breeding takes place in August and September. The males liberate sperm into the water and the females may actively collect this. Fertilisation takes place in the coelomic cavity of the female into which up to thirty oocytes are released. The fertilised embryos are liberated into the sea where they have a long period of planktonic development before settling on a suitable surface. They are present in the water column all year round, but settle between April and November, with settlement peaks in May/June and July/August. The larvae probably use olfactory clues when choosing places to settle and are able to evaluate the suitability of the surface and the proximity of other colonies. A colony can probably survive for several years on a suitable substrate, but will likely last for a shorter period when on an ephemeral base.
