= Acanthodoris metulifera =

Scientific classification
- Kingdom: Animalia
- Phylum: Mollusca
- Class: Gastropoda
- Order: Nudibranchia
- Family: Acanthodorididae
- Genus: Acanthodoris
- Species: A. metulifera

Binomial name
- Acanthodoris metulifera Bergh, 1905

Species of gastropod

Acanthodoris metulifera is a species of sea slug, a dorid nudibranch, a shell-less marine gastropod mollusc in the family Acanthodorididae.

== Distribution ==
This species was described from the north-west coast of Tasmania, Australia. It has not been reported since the original description and may be synonymous with Acanthodoris nanega and Acanthodoris globosa.
