= (2-Hydroxyethyl) dimethylsulfoxonium chloride =

Names
- Preferred IUPAC name (2-Hydroxyethyl)di(methyl)(oxo)-λ^{4}-sulfanium chloride

Identifiers
CAS Number	334026-23-2
3D model (JSmol)	Interactive image
PubChem CID	163195844
- InChI: InChI=1S/C4H11O2S.ClH/c1-7(2,6)4-3-5;/h5H,3-4H2,1-2H3;1H/q+1;/p-1 Key: PLNZFRZUPJUJMX-UHFFFAOYSA-M
- SMILES: OCC[S+](=O)(C)C.[Cl-]

Properties
Chemical formula	C_{4}H_{11}ClO_{2}S
Molar mass	158.64 g·mol^{−1}
Appearance	white solid
Density	1.251 g/cm^{3}

Related compounds
Related compounds	Choline
- Except where otherwise noted, data are given for materials in their standard state (at 25 °C [77 °F], 100 kPa). Infobox references

(2-Hydroxyethyl) dimethylsulfoxonium chloride is an organic compound with the formula [HOCH_{2}CH_{2}S(O)(CH_{3})_{2}]^{+}Cl^{−}. This sulfonium salt has been isolated from sea chervils (genus Alcyonidium) and a single species of sea sponge. It can cause a disease known as Dogger Bank itch.

== Properties ==
(2-Hydroxyethyl) dimethylsulfoxonium chloride is a colourless to white powder that dissolves in 1,4-dioxane, methanol, chloroform or water.

(2-Hydroxyethyl) dimethylsulfoxonium chloride is a salt, with a sulfur atom having a positive charge. Attached to the sulfur are two methyl groups, a double bonded oxygen atom, and an ethanol tail group attached at the number 2 carbon. The structure of this toxin has been confirmed by X-ray crystallography.
