= Acanthodoris vatheleti =

Scientific classification
- Kingdom: Animalia
- Phylum: Mollusca
- Class: Gastropoda
- Order: Nudibranchia
- Family: Acanthodorididae
- Genus: Acanthodoris
- Species: A. vatheleti

Binomial name
- Acanthodoris vatheleti Mabille & Rochebrune, 1889

Species of gastropod

Acanthodoris vatheleti is a species of sea slug, a dorid nudibranch, a shell-less marine gastropod mollusc in the family Acanthodorididae.

This is a nomen dubium.

== Distribution ==
This species was described from Orange Bay, Punta Arenas, Cape Horn, Chile. It was inadequately described and has not been reported since the original description. It may be synonymous with Acanthodoris falklandica.
