= Alcyonidium hirsutum =

Scientific classification
- Kingdom: Animalia
- Phylum: Bryozoa
- Class: Gymnolaemata
- Order: Ctenostomatida
- Family: Alcyonidiidae
- Genus: Alcyonidium
- Species: A. hirsutum

Binomial name
- Alcyonidium hirsutum Fleming, 1828

Species of moss animal

Alcyonidium hirsutum is a species of bryozoans found in shallow waters of low or fluctuating salinity, such as lagoons and estuaries. It is recognized by its surface with small papillae; when out of the water, it has a matte rather than shiny appearance.

== See also ==
- Dogger Bank itch
