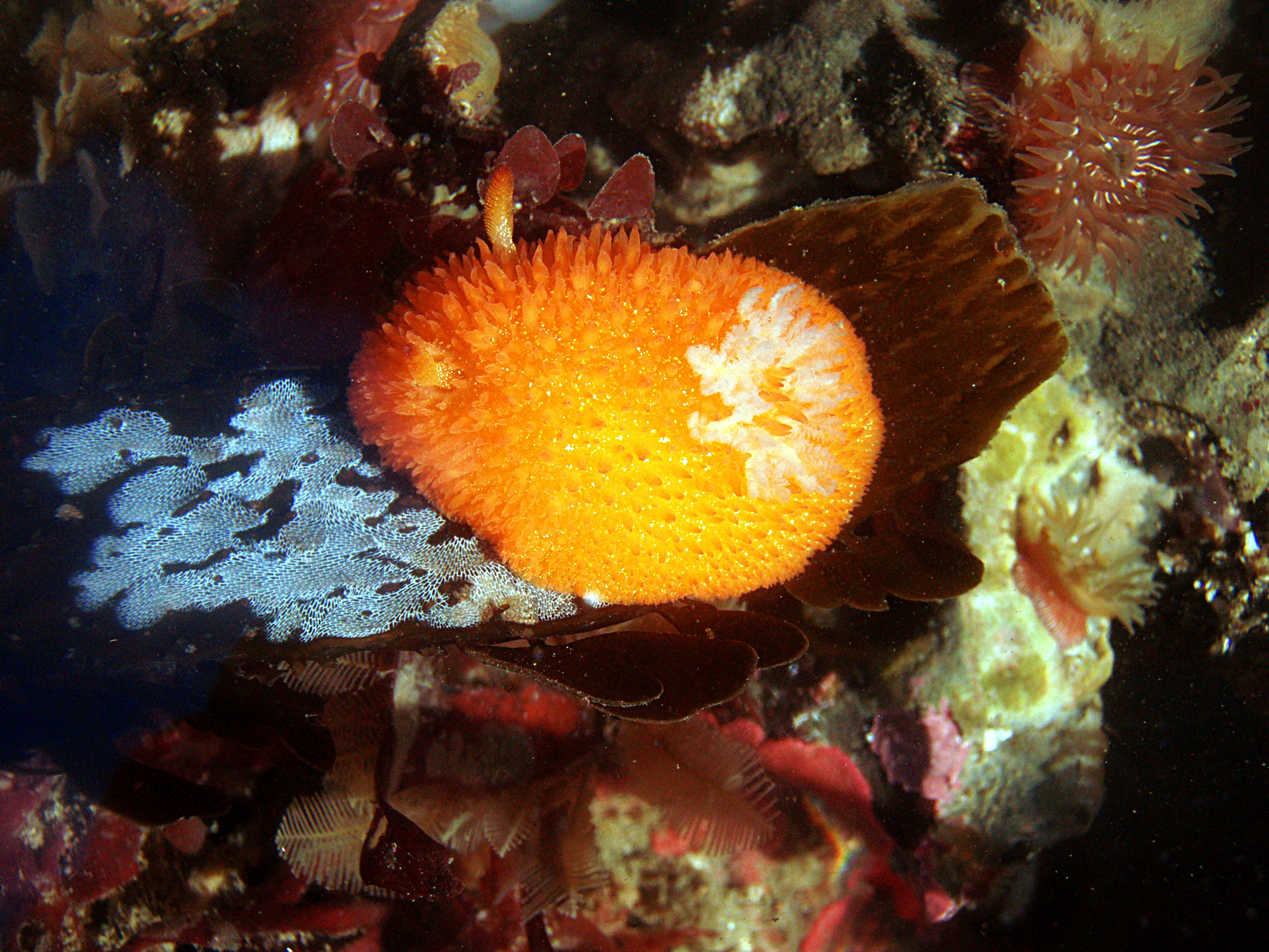

Scientific classification
- Kingdom: Animalia
- Phylum: Mollusca
- Class: Gastropoda
- Order: Nudibranchia
- Family: Acanthodorididae
- Genus: Acanthodoris
- Species: A. lutea

Binomial name
- Acanthodoris lutea MacFarland, 1925

= Acanthodoris lutea =

Orange-peel doris

Species of gastropod

Acanthodoris lutea, the orange-peel doris, is a species of nudibranch or sea slug, a shell-less marine opisthobranch gastropod mollusk in the family Acanthodorididae.

This species is the largest of the northeastern Pacific onchidorids. It is a common species, and it is very noticeable because of its bright coloration, which is aposematic. The species name "lutea" is a Latin word which means an orange-yellow color. The generic name, "acantho" comes from the Greek word meaning spiny, and "doris" is the name of an ancient Greek sea nymph.

== Description ==
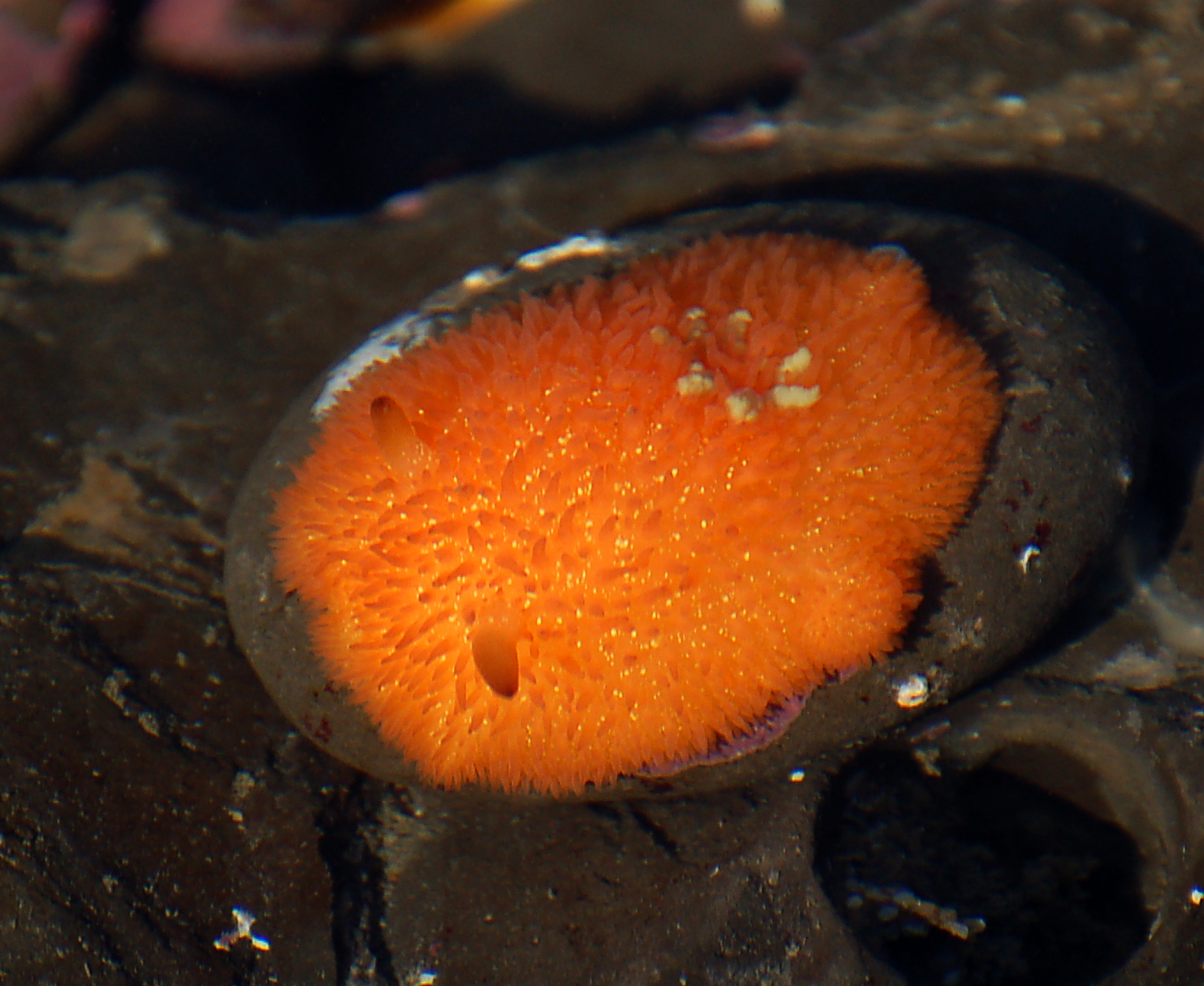
Acanthodoris lutea

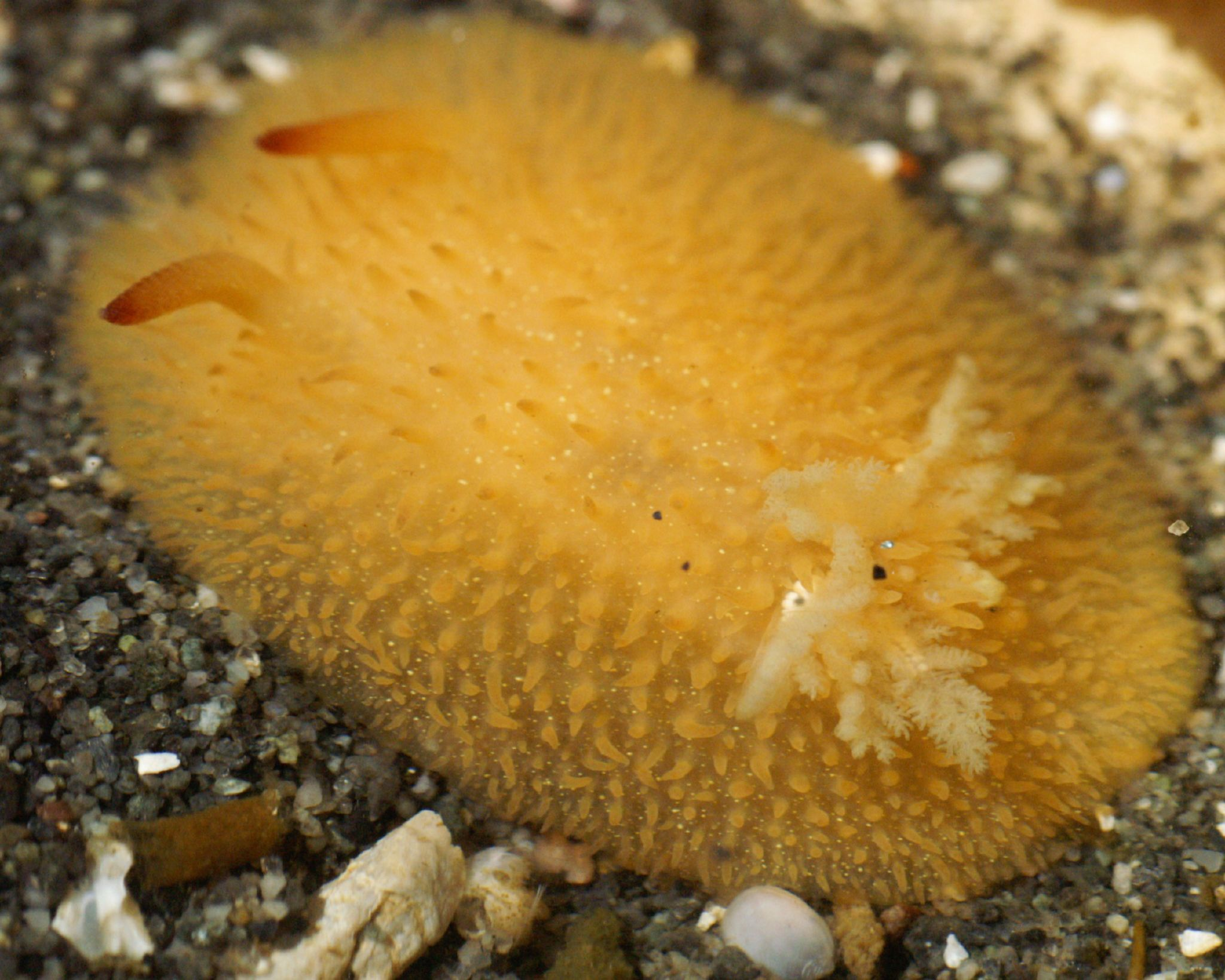
Acanthodoris lutea

This nudibranch grows to about 30 mm in length. It has a bright orange papillated dorsum covered with yellow specks. As is the case with many nudibranchs, this bright coloration is thought to be a reminder to would-be predators of its distasteful nature, an example of aposematic coloration. However, paler color variations exist in British Canada. Individuals of A. lutea in the Salish Sea are extremely variable in color, ranging from almost fully white to brown with whitish papillae, due to different habitats and diets. When handled, these slugs often smell of sandalwood.

== Distribution ==
This dorid nudibranch was described from Cayucos, San Luis Obispo County, California. It lives on the Pacific coast of North America from Cape Arago, Oregon to northern Baja California, Mexico. Specimens from Duxbury Reef, Marin County, California and Puget Sound, Kitsap County, Washington have been sequenced for the 16S ribosomal RNA, Histone H3 and CO1 genes.

== Habitat ==
The orange-peel doris lives in the intertidal and subtidal zones on rocky shores.

== Life habits ==
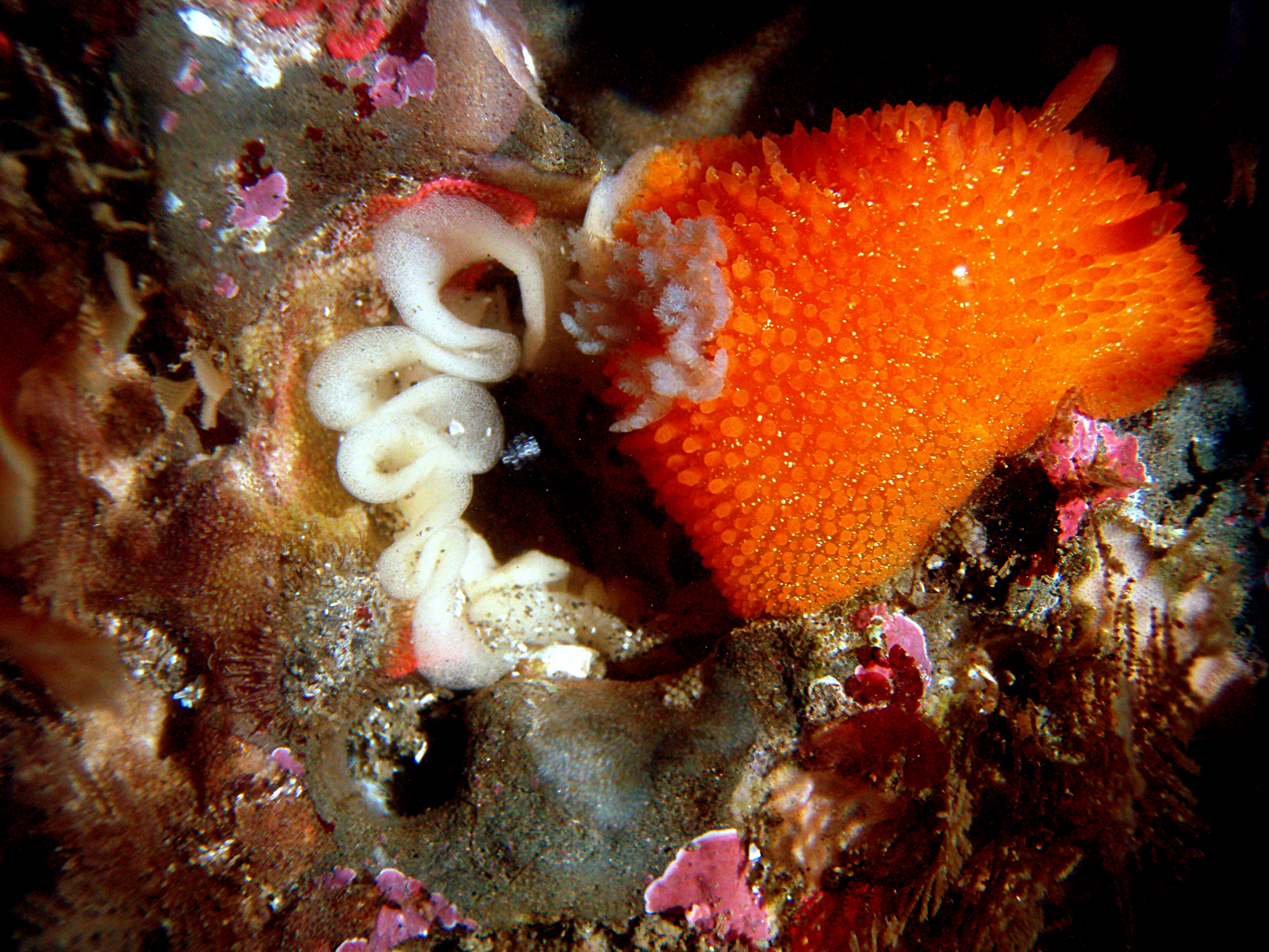
Acanthodoris lutea in a California tide pool laying eggs

Acanthodoris lutea feeds on bryozoans of the genus Alcyonidium. It turns the chemicals taken from the bryozoan food into a noxious metabolite which is toxic to possible predators. This species is aposematically colored, warning predators of this toxic deterrent.
