= Alcyonidium nodosum =

Scientific classification
- Kingdom: Animalia
- Phylum: Bryozoa
- Class: Gymnolaemata
- Order: Ctenostomatida
- Family: Alcyonidiidae
- Genus: Alcyonidium
- Species: A. nodosum

Binomial name
- Alcyonidium nodosum O'Donoghue & de Watteville, 1944

Species of bryozoan

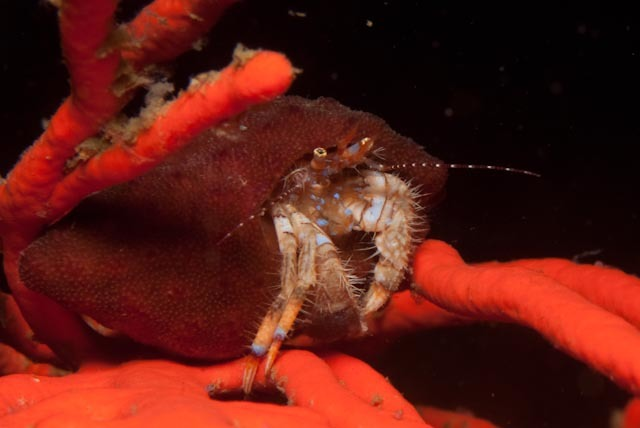
Alcyonidium nodosum near Cape Town, South Africa

Alcyonidium nodosum is a species of bryozoan belonging to the family Alcyonidiidae.

The species is found in Southern Africa.

The species inhabits marine environments.
