= Acanthodoris caerulescens =

Scientific classification
- Kingdom: Animalia
- Phylum: Mollusca
- Class: Gastropoda
- Order: Nudibranchia
- Family: Acanthodorididae
- Genus: Acanthodoris
- Species: A. caerulescens

Binomial name
- Acanthodoris caerulescens Bergh, 1880

Species of gastropod

Acanthodoris caerulescens is a species of sea slug, a dorid nudibranch, a shell-less marine gastropod mollusc in the family Acanthodorididae.

This is a taxon inquirendum.

== Distribution ==
This species was described from the north end of Nunivak Island, Alaska. It has not been reported since the original description.
