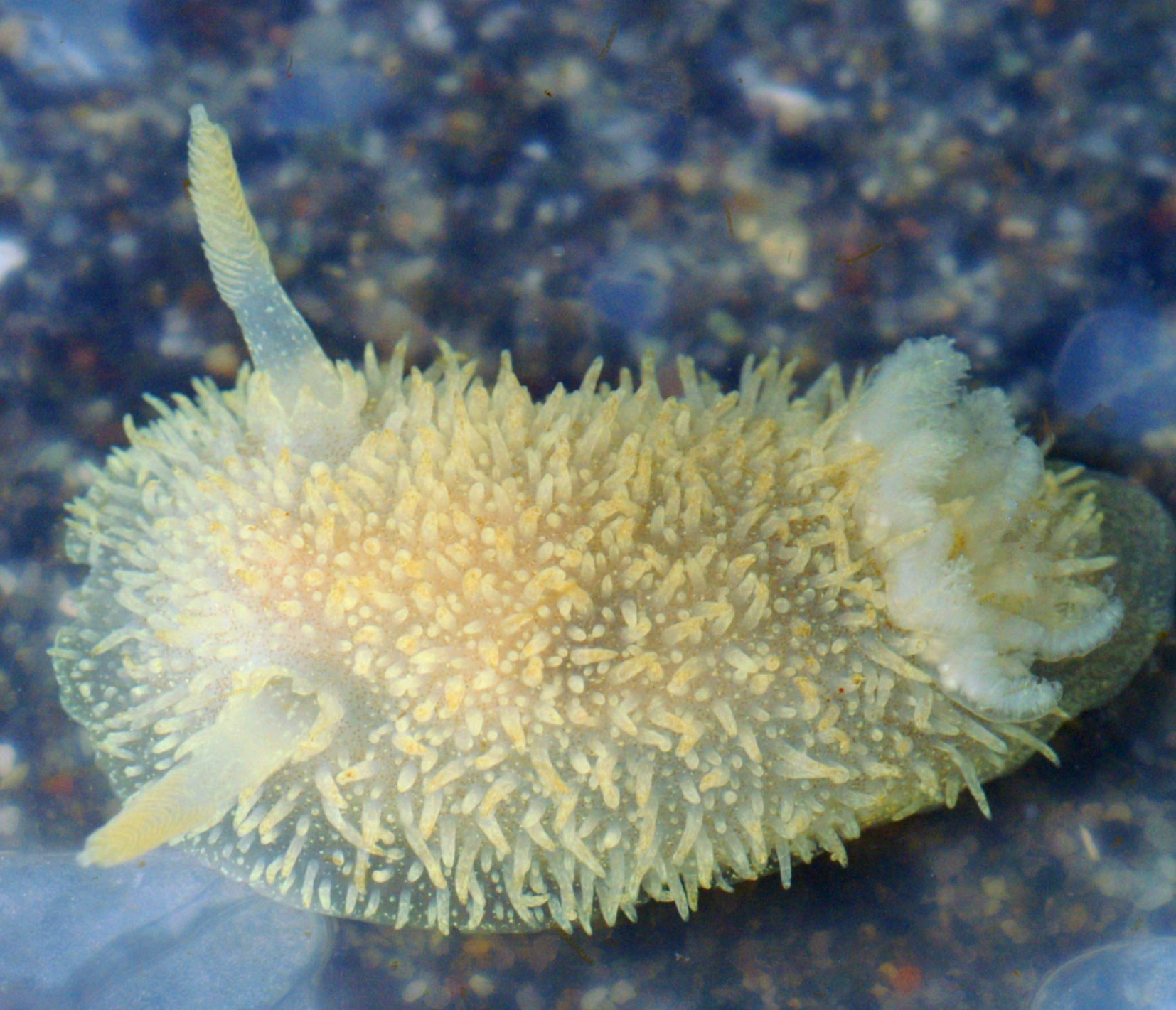

Scientific classification
- Kingdom: Animalia
- Phylum: Mollusca
- Class: Gastropoda
- Order: Nudibranchia
- Family: Acanthodorididae
- Genus: Acanthodoris
- Species: A. pilosa

Binomial name
- Acanthodoris pilosa Abildgaard in O. F. Müller, 1789

Synonyms
- Acanthodoris citrina (Verrill, 1879); Acanthodoris ornata (Verrill, 1879); Acanthodoris pilosa pilosa (Abildgaard, 1789); Acanthodoris quadrangulata (Alder & Hancock); Doris bifida (Verrill, 1870); Doris flemingii (Forbes, 1838); Doris laevis (Müller, 1776); Doris nigricans (Fleming, 1828); Doris quadrangulata (Jeffreys, 1869); Doris rocinela (Leach in Gray, 1852); Doris similis (Alder & Hancock, 1842); Doris stellata (Gmelin, 1791); Doris sublaevis (Thompson, 1840); Doris subquadrata (Alder & Hancock, 1845); Doris vocinella (Leach, 1847)

= Acanthodoris pilosa =

Species of gastropod

Acanthodoris pilosa, the hairy spiny doris, is a species of sea slug, a dorid nudibranch, a shell-less marine gastropod mollusc in the family Acanthodorididae.

It is found in shallow water in the northeastern Atlantic Ocean, its range extending from Norway to France, and also both on the eastern coast of Canada and the United States, and the Pacific coast from the Aleutian Islands to Morro Bay, California.

== Description ==
Acanthodoris pilosa grows to a length of about 3 cm (1.2 in), or occasionally as much as 7 cm (2.8 in). It gives the impression of being fluffy because the body is covered with long, fleshy pointed papillae. At the head end are two rhinophores, much larger than the papillae, which house the sensory organs; these typically are bent towards the rear of the animal. At the posterior end there is a distinctive ring of up to nine gills. This sea slug has a uniform colour which may be anything from whitish to pale purplish-brown to darker brown or charcoal grey. Juveniles are often speckled.

== Distribution ==
This species was first described from Norway. It has been reported from the North Atlantic Ocean on both the American and European coasts, and from the Pacific Northwest. Specimens from Cobscook Bay, Washington County, Maine and Murles Point, County Donegal, Ireland have been sequenced for the 16S ribosomal RNA, Histone H3 and CO1 genes. It is common all round the British Isles in the shallow subtidal zone, at depths down to about 80 m (262 ft).

Reports of this species from Japan must be considered doubtful in the light of recent molecular phylogeny results which show that at least some of the animals from the North Pacific are Acanthodoris atrogriseata.

== Ecology ==
This nudibranch is found on rocks and other hard substrates and feeds on encrusting bryozoans.
