= Acanthodoris armata =

Scientific classification
- Kingdom: Animalia
- Phylum: Mollusca
- Class: Gastropoda
- Order: Nudibranchia
- Family: Acanthodorididae
- Genus: Acanthodoris
- Species: A. armata

Binomial name
- Acanthodoris armata O'Donoghue, 1927

Species of gastropod

Acanthodoris armata is a species of sea slug, a dorid nudibranch, a shell-less marine gastropod mollusc in the family Acanthodorididae.

This is a taxon inquirendum.

== Distribution ==
This species was described from specimens found in the intertidal region at False Narrows, Nanaimo, Vancouver Island, Canada feeding on the bryozoan Dendrobeania lichenoides (Robertson, 1900).
