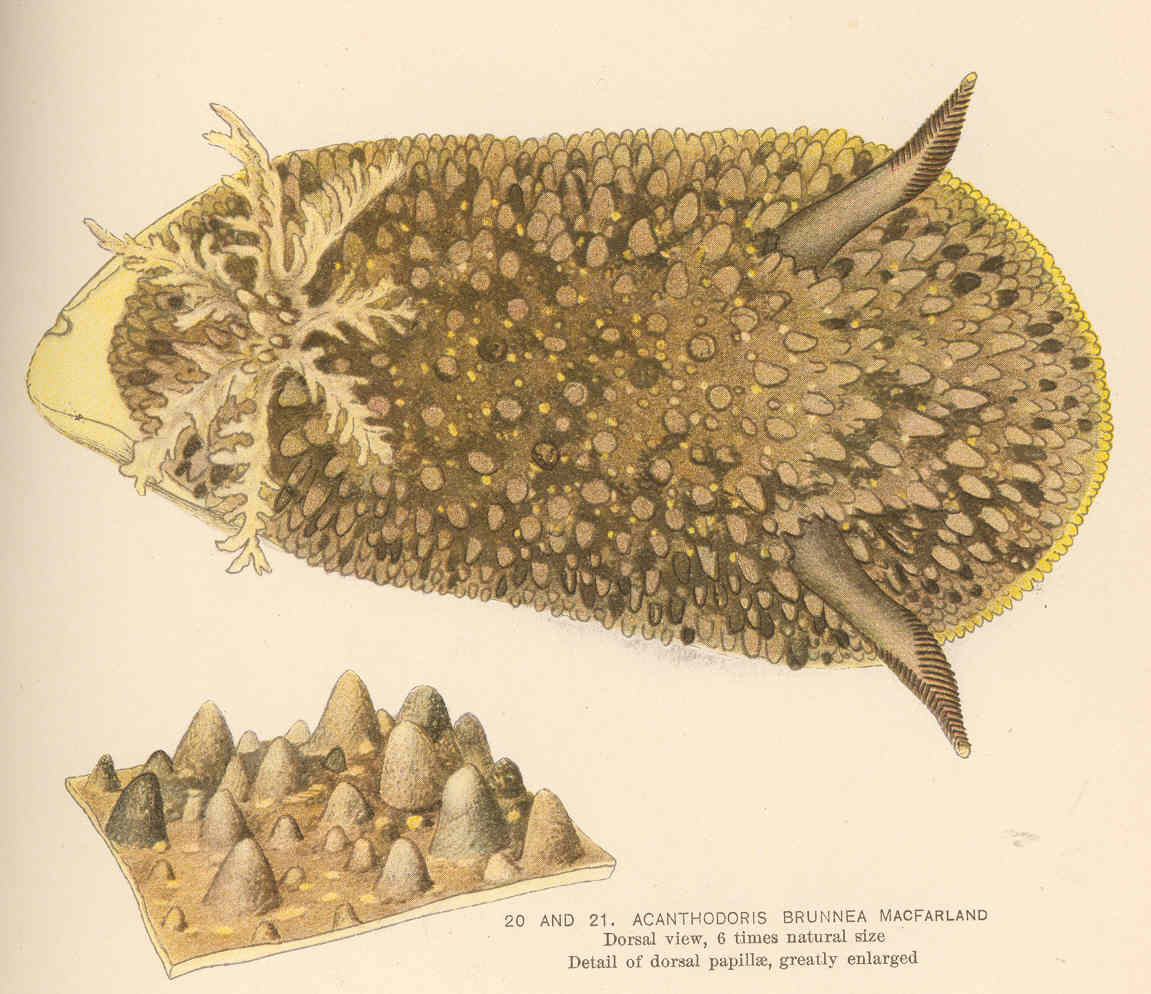
- Dorsal view and detail of dorsal papillae of the nudibranch Acanthodoris brunnea

Scientific classification
- Kingdom: Animalia
- Phylum: Mollusca
- Class: Gastropoda
- Order: Nudibranchia
- Family: Acanthodorididae
- Genus: Acanthodoris
- Species: A. brunnea

Binomial name
- Acanthodoris brunnea MacFarland, 1905

= Acanthodoris brunnea =

Species of gastropod

Acanthodoris brunnea, common name the brown horned dorid, is a species of sea slugs, a dorid nudibranch, a shell-less marine gastropod mollusc in the family Acanthodorididae.

== Distribution ==
This species was described from Monterey Bay, California. It has been reported from Vancouver Island, British Columbia south to Santa Monica Bay. Specimens from Monterey Bay have been sequenced for the 16S ribosomal RNA and CO1 genes.

== Description ==
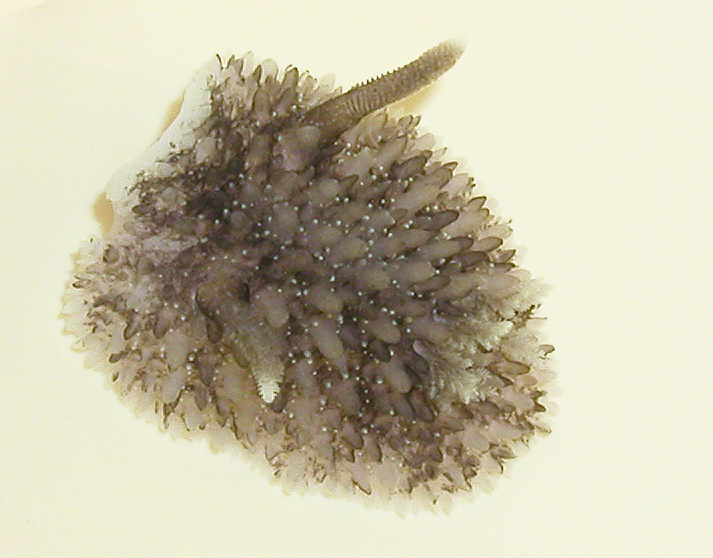
An Acanthodoris brunnea

A. brunnea has a brown mantle with white and black spots. Most of the mantle is covered with semi-transparent gray papilla. They grow to about 20mm long.

It is described that when handled, Acanthodoris brunnea emit the smell of cedar.
