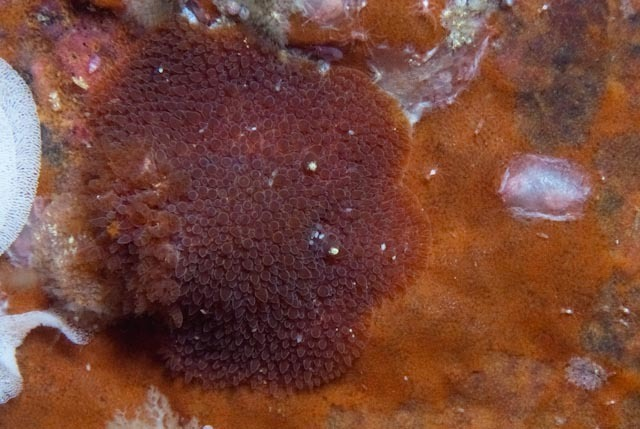

Scientific classification
- Kingdom: Animalia
- Phylum: Mollusca
- Class: Gastropoda
- Order: Nudibranchia
- Family: Acanthodorididae
- Genus: Acanthodoris
- Species: A. planca

Binomial name
- Acanthodoris planca Fahey & Valdés, 2005

= Acanthodoris planca =

Fluffy nudibranch

Species of gastropod

Acanthodoris planca (fluffy nudibranch) is a species of dorid nudibranch. It is a marine gastropod mollusc in the family Acanthodorididae.

== Distribution ==
This species was described from Cove Rock, False Bay, South Africa. It is found off South Africa on both sides of the Cape Peninsula in shallow water. It is endemic to South Africa. Specimens from Table Bay, Western Cape Province and Tsitsikamma Coastal National Park, Eastern Cape Province have been sequenced for the 16S ribosomal RNA, Histone H3 and CO1 genes.

== Description ==
The fluffy nudibranch is a small tan-coloured dorid with a nippled surface. The animal may reach 20 mm in total length.

== Ecology ==
The egg ribbon of the fluffy nudibranch is an irregular wavy white collar.
