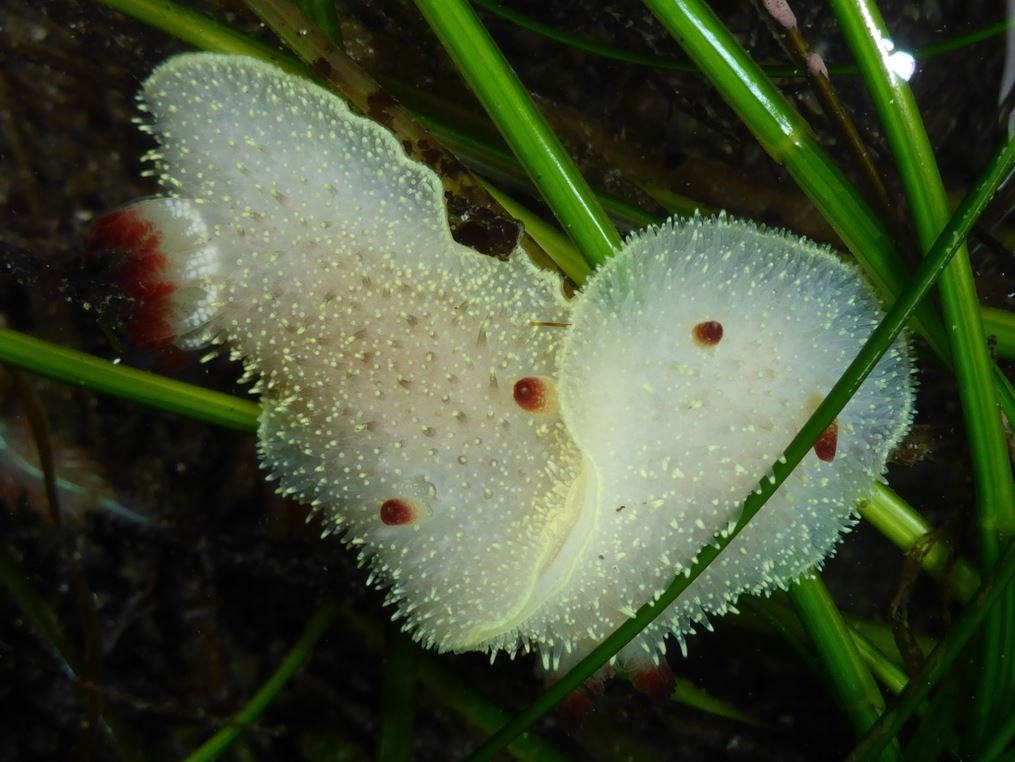
- Acanthodoris nanaimoensis from Pillar Point, California

Scientific classification
- Kingdom: Animalia
- Phylum: Mollusca
- Class: Gastropoda
- Order: Nudibranchia
- Family: Acanthodorididae
- Genus: Acanthodoris
- Species: A. nanaimoensis

Binomial name
- Acanthodoris nanaimoensis O'Donoghue, 1921

Synonyms
- Acanthodoris columbina MacFarland, 1926

= Acanthodoris nanaimoensis =

Species of gastropod

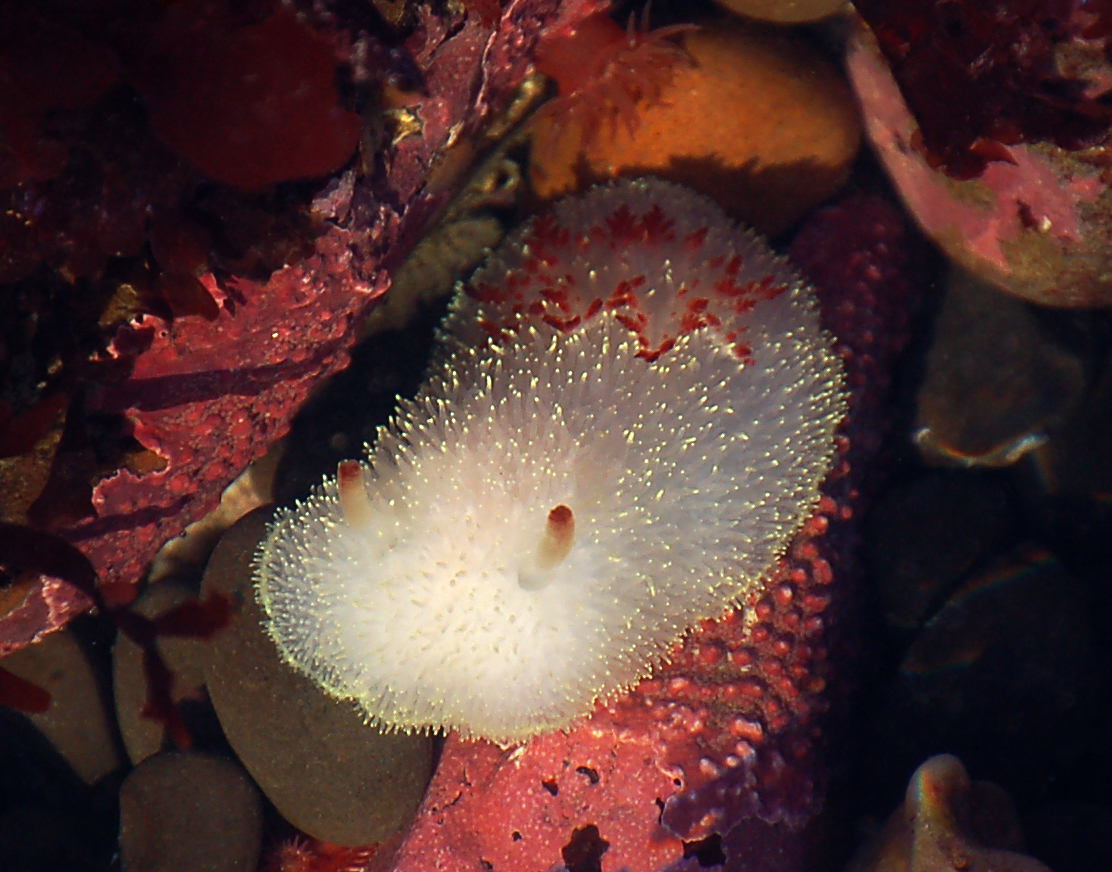
Acanthodoris nanaimoensis

Acanthodoris nanaimoensis, the Nanaimo horned dorid, is a species of dorid nudibranch, a shell-less marine gastropod mollusc in the family Acanthodorididae.

== Distribution ==
A. nanaimeonsis was described in Jesse Island, in the lagoon near Hammond's Bay, Nanaimo, and British Columbia. Frank Mace MacFarland, an American malacologist, described the same species in Moss Beach, Montara Point, San Mateo County, in California, under the name Acanthodoris columbina. It is reported from Halibut Point, Baranof Island, Alaska south to Purisima Point, Santa Barbara, California. Some specimens from Pillar Point, San Mateo County, California, Puget Sound, Kitsap County, and Washington, have been sequenced for 16S ribosomal RNA, Histone H3 and CO1 genes.
