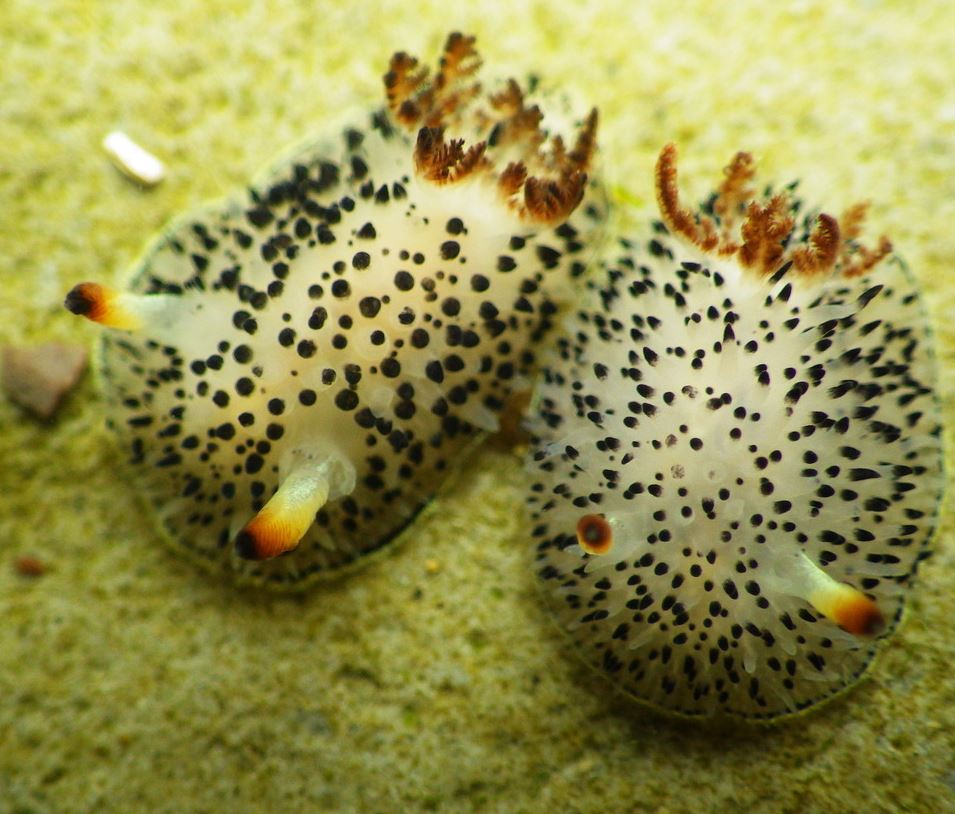
- Acanthodoris rhodoceras from Montana de Oro State Park, California

Scientific classification
- Kingdom: Animalia
- Phylum: Mollusca
- Class: Gastropoda
- Order: Nudibranchia
- Family: Acanthodorididae
- Genus: Acanthodoris
- Species: A. rhodoceras

Binomial name
- Acanthodoris rhodoceras Cockerell & Eliot, 1905

= Acanthodoris rhodoceras =

Species of gastropod

Acanthodoris rhodoceras is a species of sea slug, a dorid nudibranch, a shell-less marine gastropod mollusc in the family Acanthodorididae.

== Distribution ==
This species was described from Dead Man's Island, San Pedro, California. It has been reported from Umpqua River, Oregon south to Bahía de los Ángeles, Gulf of California, Mexico. Specimens from Pillar Point, San Mateo County; Ellwood Boulder Field, Santa Barbara County and Hazard Canyon, San Luis Obispo County have been sequenced for the 16S ribosomal RNA, Histone H3 and CO1 genes.
