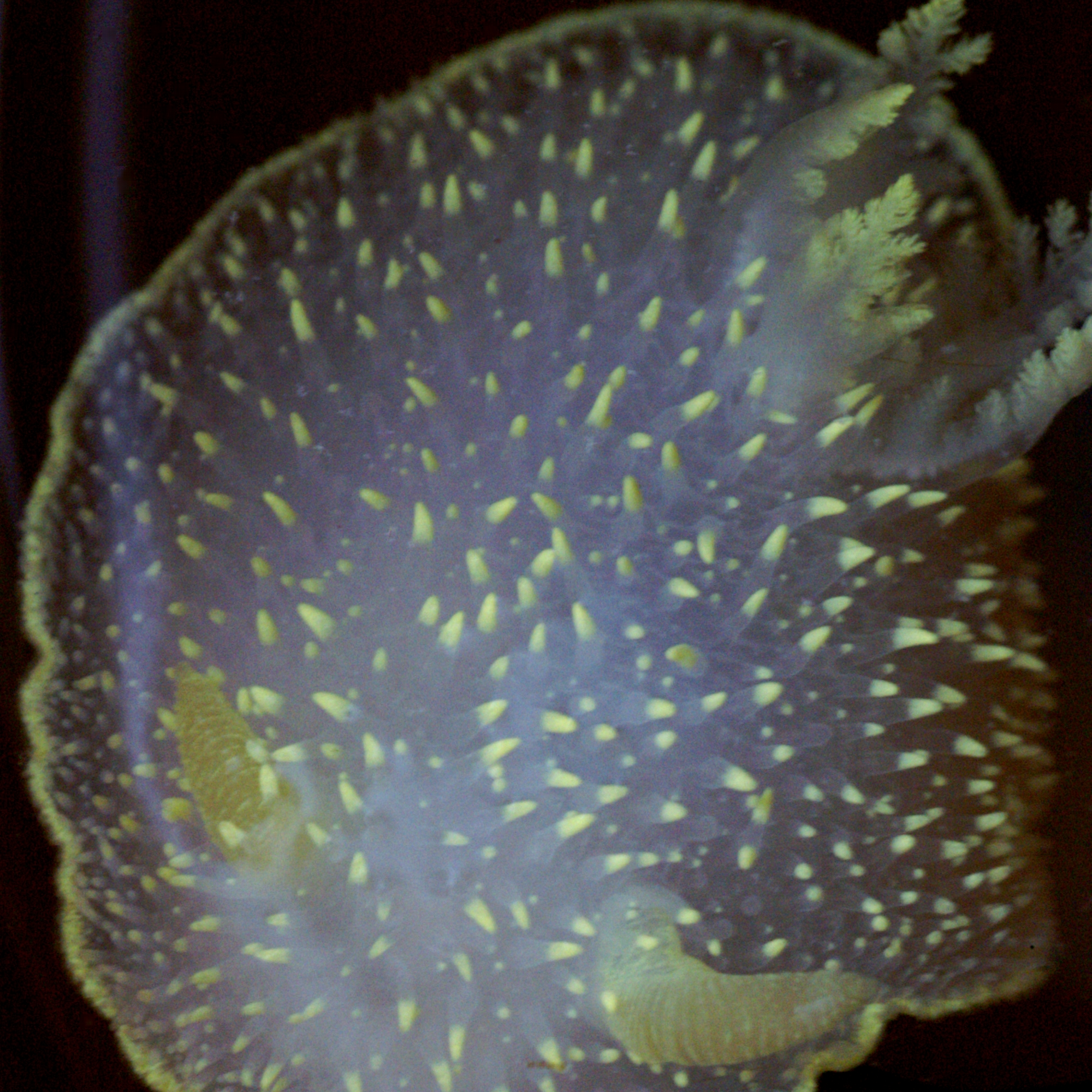

Scientific classification
- Kingdom: Animalia
- Phylum: Mollusca
- Class: Gastropoda
- Order: Nudibranchia
- Family: Acanthodorididae
- Genus: Acanthodoris
- Species: A. hudsoni

Binomial name
- Acanthodoris hudsoni MacFarland, 1905

= Acanthodoris hudsoni =

Species of gastropod

Acanthodoris hudsoni is a species of sea slug, a dorid nudibranch, a shell-less marine gastropod mollusc in the family Acanthodorididae.

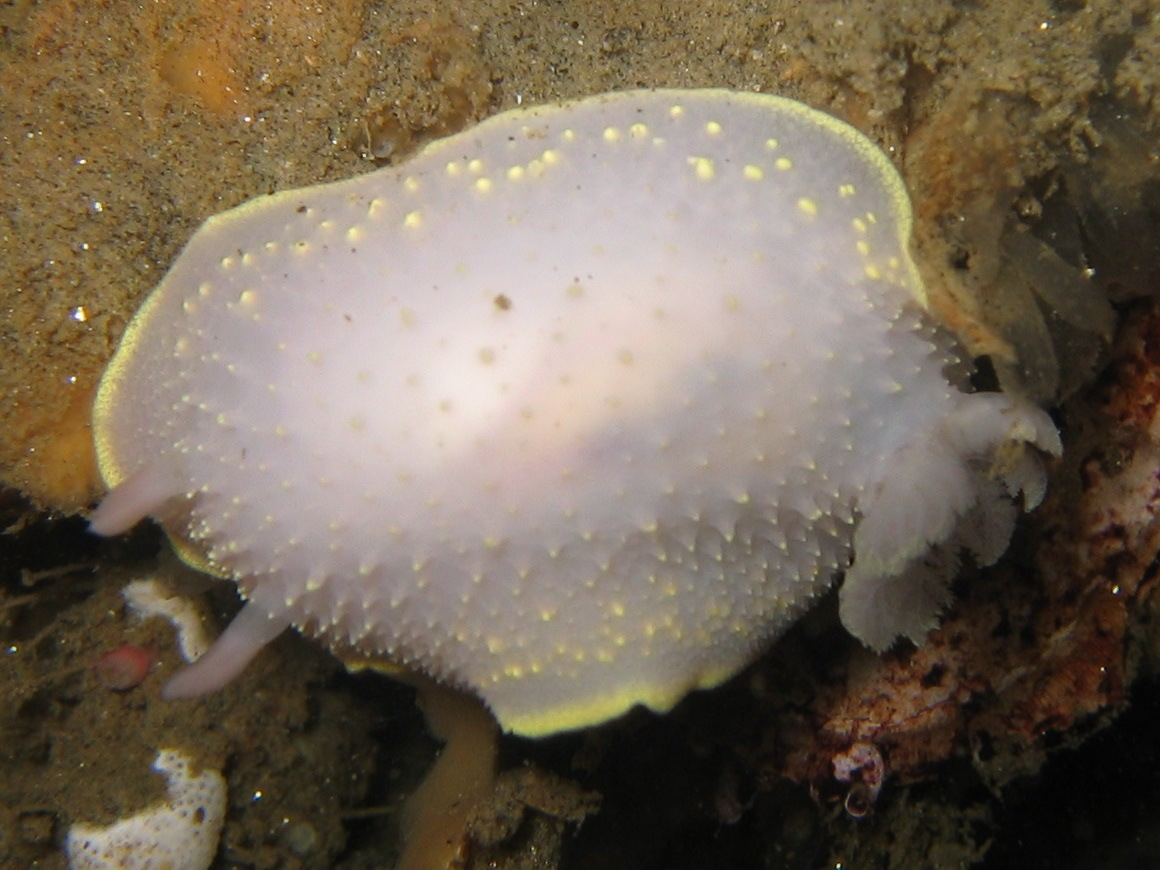
Acanthodoris hudsoni

== Distribution ==
This species was described from Point Pinos, Monterey Bay, California. It has been reported from Alaska south to San Diego and Santa Catalina Island, California. A specimen from Asilomar, Monterey Bay has been sequenced for the 16S ribosomal RNA, Histone H3 and CO1 genes and several specimens from Puget Sound, Kitsap County, Washington have been sequenced for 16S and CO1.

== Description ==
A. hudsoni is a translucent white color. Its mantle is covered in pointed papilla. The mantle has a milky yellow border to it. Both the gills and the rhinophores are transparent, though the tips have a yellow tinge. The rhinophores are generally short and are curved slightly.

== Diet ==
Acanthodoris hudsoni feeds on an erect ctenostome bryozoan of the genus Alcyonidium.
