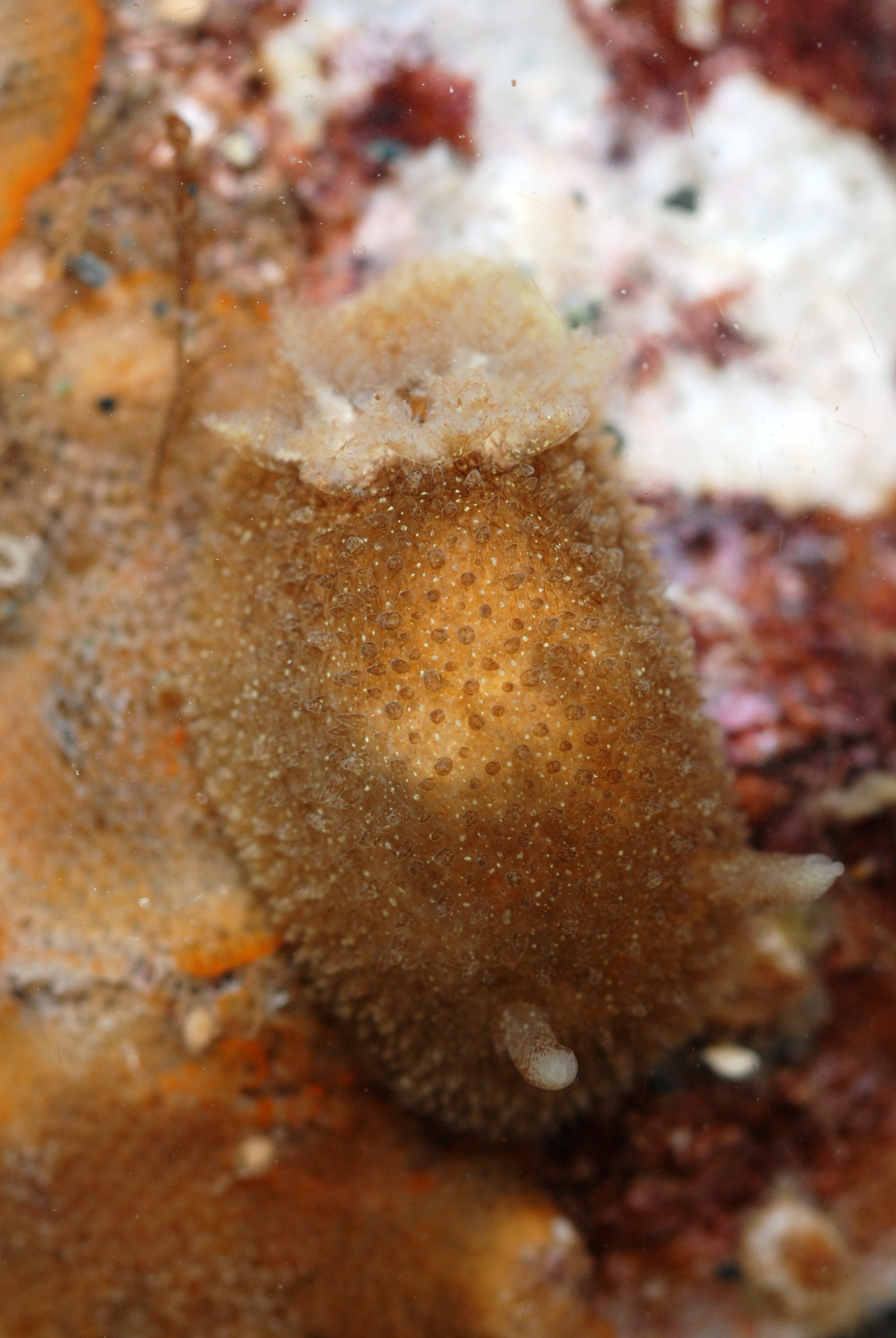
- Acanthodoris atrogriseata from Seattle, Washington.

Scientific classification
- Kingdom: Animalia
- Phylum: Mollusca
- Class: Gastropoda
- Order: Nudibranchia
- Family: Acanthodorididae
- Genus: Acanthodoris
- Species: A. atrogriseata

Binomial name
- Acanthodoris atrogriseata O'Donoghue, 1927

= Acanthodoris atrogriseata =

Species of gastropod

Acanthodoris atrogriseata is a species of sea slug, a dorid nudibranch, a shell-less marine gastropod mollusc in the family Acanthodorididae.

== Distribution ==
This species was described from specimens found beneath stones in the intertidal region at False Narrows, Nanaimo, Vancouver Island, Canada. It has been reported from Kiska Island, Alaska to Morro Bay, California. It has been considered to be a synonym of Acanthodoris pilosa by many authors but has been shown to be a distinct species by molecular phylogeny.
