= Acanthodoris pina =

Scientific classification
- Kingdom: Animalia
- Phylum: Mollusca
- Class: Gastropoda
- Order: Nudibranchia
- Family: Acanthodorididae
- Genus: Acanthodoris
- Species: A. pina

Binomial name
- Acanthodoris pina Er. Marcus & Ev. Marcus, 1967

Synonyms
- Acanthodoris stohleri Lance, 1968; Acanthodoris serpentinotus Williams & Gosliner, 1979

Species of gastropod

Acanthodoris pina is a species of sea slug, a dorid nudibranch, a shell-less marine gastropod mollusc in the family Acanthodorididae.

== Distribution ==
This species was described from Puerto Penasco, Sonora, Mexico. It has been reported from there south to Bahía de los Ángeles. It is thought to be endemic to the northern part of the Gulf of California. Specimens from Baja California have been sequenced for the 16S ribosomal RNA, Histone H3 and CO1 genes.
