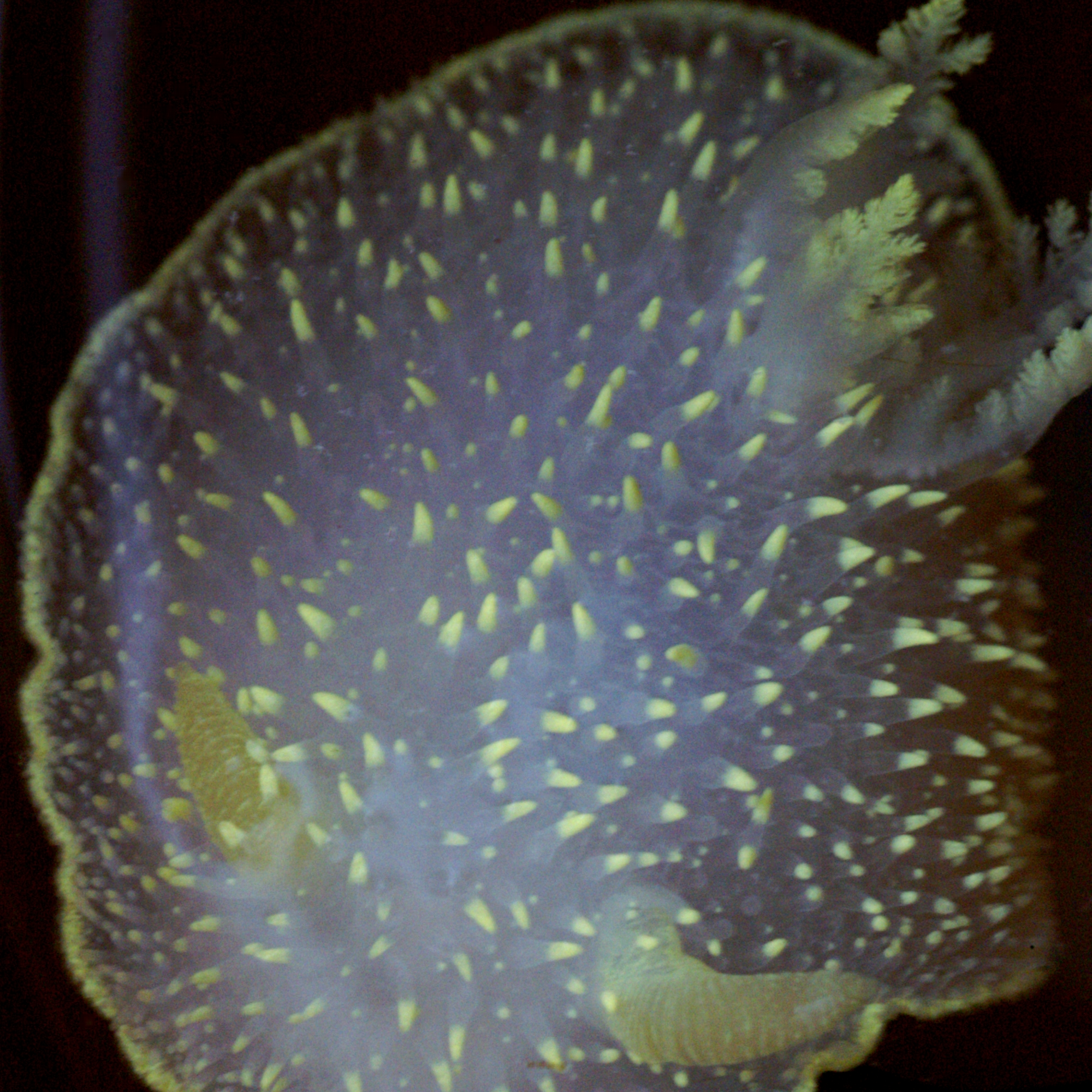
- Acanthodoris hudsoni

Scientific classification
- Kingdom: Animalia
- Phylum: Mollusca
- Class: Gastropoda
- Order: Nudibranchia
- Family: Acanthodorididae
- Genus: Acanthodoris (Gray, 1850)

Type species
- Doris pilosa Abildgaard, 1789

Diversity
- 18 species (in this list)

= Acanthodoris =

Genus of gastropods

Acanthodoris is a genus of sea slugs, dorid nudibranchs, shell-less marine gastropod mollusks in the family Acanthodorididae.

The genus is believed to have originated in the Atlantic Ocean in the Cretaceous period and spread to the Pacific Ocean.

The relationships of Acanthodoris to the other genera in the superfamily Onchidoridoidea were evaluated by molecular phylogeny in 2015. and in 2024.

== Species ==
Species within this genus include:

- Acanthodoris armata O'Donoghue, 1927 (taxon inquirendum)
- Acanthodoris atrogriseata O'Donoghue, 1927
- Acanthodoris brunnea MacFarland, 1905
- Acanthodoris caerulescens Bergh, 1880 (taxon inquirendum)
- Acanthodoris falklandica Eliot, 1907
- Acanthodoris globosa Abraham, 1877
- Acanthodoris hudsoni MacFarland, 1905
- Acanthodoris lutea MacFarland, 1925
- Acanthodoris metulifera Bergh, 1905
- Acanthodoris mollicella Abraham, 1877
- Acanthodoris nanaimoensis O'Donoghue, 1921
- Acanthodoris nanega Burn, 1969
- Acanthodoris pilosa (Abildgaard in Müller, 1789) - type species
- Acanthodoris pina Ev. Marcus & Er. Marcus, 1967
- Acanthodoris planca Fahey & Valdés, 2005
- Acanthodoris rhodoceras Cockerell in Cockerell & Eliot, 1905
- Acanthodoris vatheleti Rochebrune & Mabille, 1891 (nomen dubium)

Species brought into synonymy

- Acanthodoris bifida (Verrill, 1870): synonym of Acanthodoris pilosa (Abildgaard in Müller, 1789)
- Acanthodoris citrina (Verrill, 1879): synonym of Acanthodoris pilosa (Abildgaard in Müller, 1789)
- Acanthodoris columbina MacFarland, 1926: synonym of Acanthodoris nanaimoensis O'Donoghue, 1921
- Acanthodoris ornata (Verrill, 1879): synonym of Acanthodoris pilosa (Abildgaard in Müller, 1789)
- Acanthodoris pallida Bergh, 1905: synonym of Acanthodoris pilosa (Abildgaard in Müller, 1789)
  - Acanthodoris pilosa ornata (Verrill, 1879): synonym of Acanthodoris pilosa (Abildgaard in Müller, 1789)
- Acanthodoris serpentinotus Williams & Gosliner, 1979: synonym of Acanthodoris pina Ev. Marcus & Er. Marcus, 1967
- Acanthodoris stellata (Gmelin, 1791): synonym of Acanthodoris pilosa (Abildgaard in Müller, 1789)
- Acanthodoris stohleri Lance, 1968: synonym of Acanthodoris pina Ev. Marcus & Er. Marcus, 1967
- Acanthodoris subquadrata (Alder & Hancock, 1845): synonym of Acanthodoris pilosa (Abildgaard in Müller, 1789)
- Acanthodoris uchidai Baba, 1935: synonym of Acanthomira uchidai (Baba, 1935) (superseded combination)
