= Acanthodoris falklandica =

Scientific classification
- Kingdom: Animalia
- Phylum: Mollusca
- Class: Gastropoda
- Order: Nudibranchia
- Family: Acanthodorididae
- Genus: Acanthodoris
- Species: A. falklandica

Binomial name
- Acanthodoris falklandica Eliot, 1907

Species of gastropod

Acanthodoris falklandica is a species of sea slug, a dorid nudibranch, a shell-less marine gastropod mollusc in the family Acanthodorididae.

== Distribution ==
This species was described from Falkland Islands. It has been reported from Chile and a specimen from Puerto Montt, Llanquihue Province, has been sequenced for the Histone H3 gene.
