= Rhinophore =

Anatomy of groups of marine gastropods

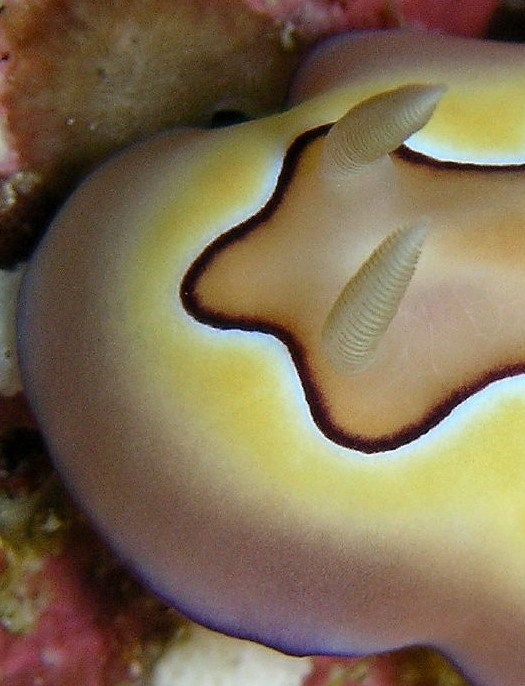
A pair of rhinophores on the head of Goniobranchus coi

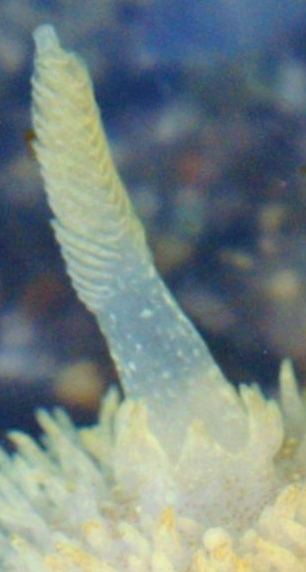
Right rhinophore of Acanthodoris pilosa

A rhinophore is one of a pair of chemosensory club-shaped, rod-shaped or ear-like structures which are the most prominent part of the external head anatomy in sea slugs, marine gastropod opisthobranch mollusks such as the nudibranchs, sea hares (Aplysiomorpha), and sap-sucking sea slugs (Sacoglossa).

== Etymology ==
The name relates to the rhinophore's function as an organ of smell. Rhino- means "nose", the combining form of Ancient Greek ῥίς rhís. -Phore means "bearer" or "carrier", from Neo-Latin -phorus, itself from Ancient Greek -φόρος -phóros "bearing" or "carrying", a derivative of φέρω phérō, "to bear, carry".

== Function ==
Rhinophores are scent or taste receptors, also known as chemosensory organs situated on the dorsal surface of the head. They are primarily used for distance chemoreception and rheoreception (response to water current).

The "scents" detected by rhinophores are chemicals dissolved in the sea water. The fine structure and hairs of the rhinophore provide a large surface area so that chemical detection is maximized. This allows the nudibranchs to stay close to their food source (for example species of sponges) and to find mates. In the sea hare Aplysia californica, the rhinophores are able to detect pheromones.

== Protection ==
To protect the prominent rhinophores against nibbling by predators, including fish, most species of dorid nudibranchs are able to withdraw their rhinophores into a pocket beneath the skin.

== Structure ==
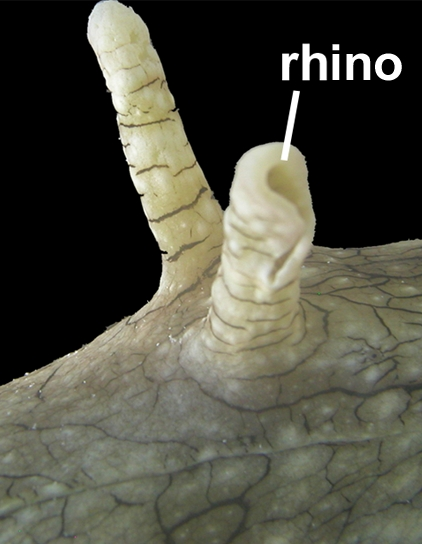
Rhinophores of Aplysia californica

In reproductively mature Aplysia adults, the rhinophore is about 1 cm in length. The neuroanatomical organization includes a rhinophore groove where most of the sensory cells appear to be concentrated. Its sensory epithelium contains sensory neurons that project axons back to rhinophore ganglia and dendrites that end in either a surface-exposed cilium or a small protuberance.

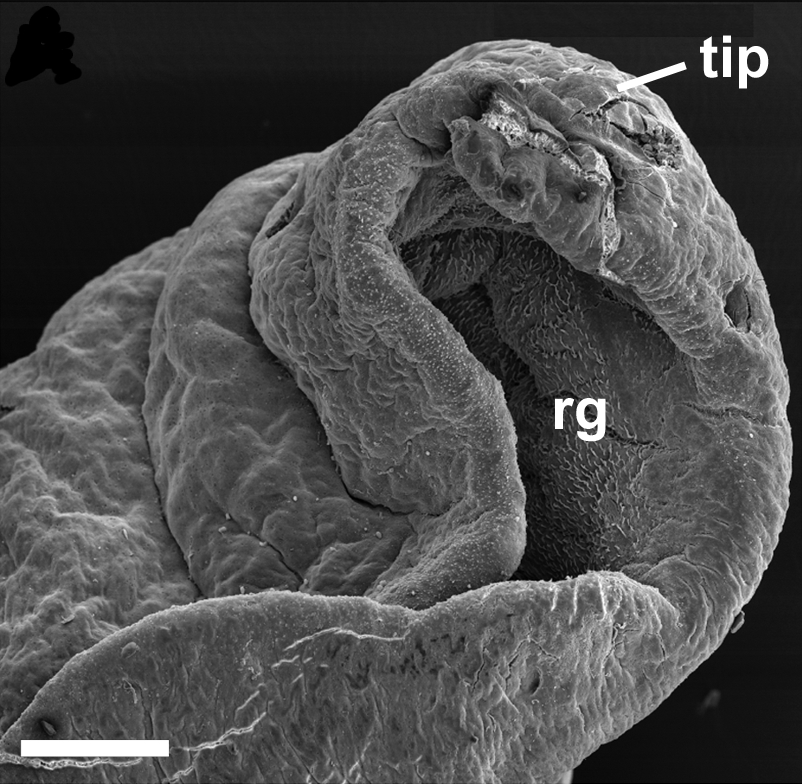
A low-power scanning electron microscopy (SEM) micrograph showing the rhinophore tip of Aplysia californica Scale bar is 300 μm. rg - rhinophore groove tip - rhinophore tip.

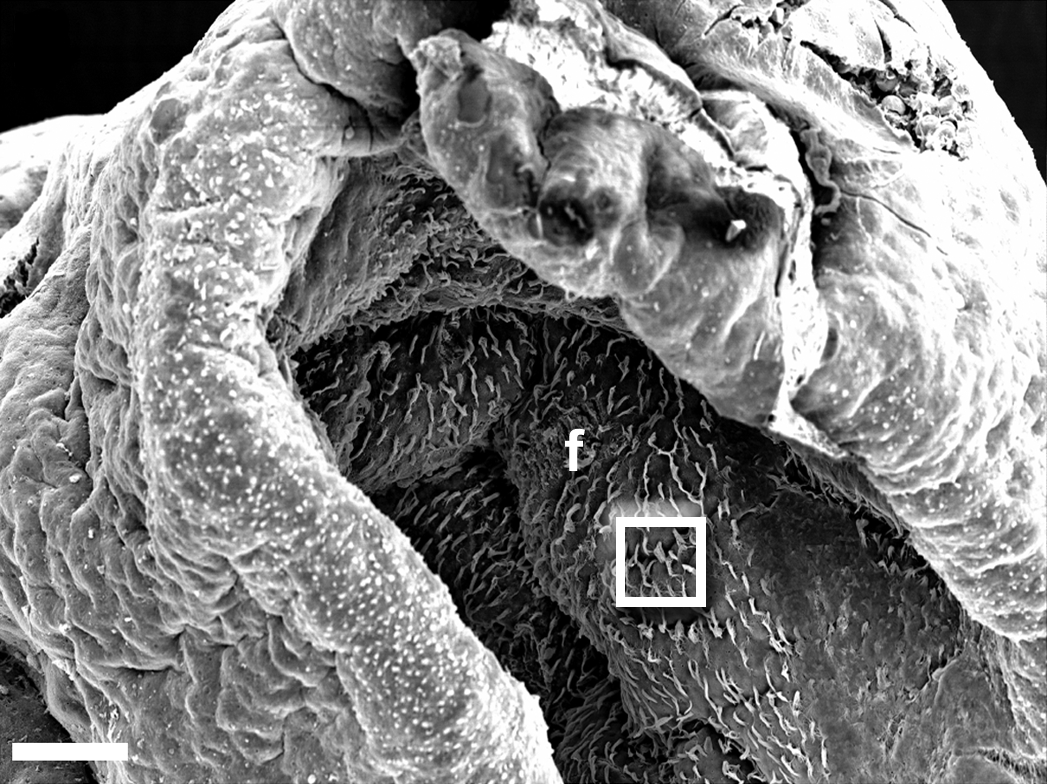
A medium-power SEM image showing the cilia-bearing epithelium within the rhinophore groove Scale bar is 100 μm. f - folds

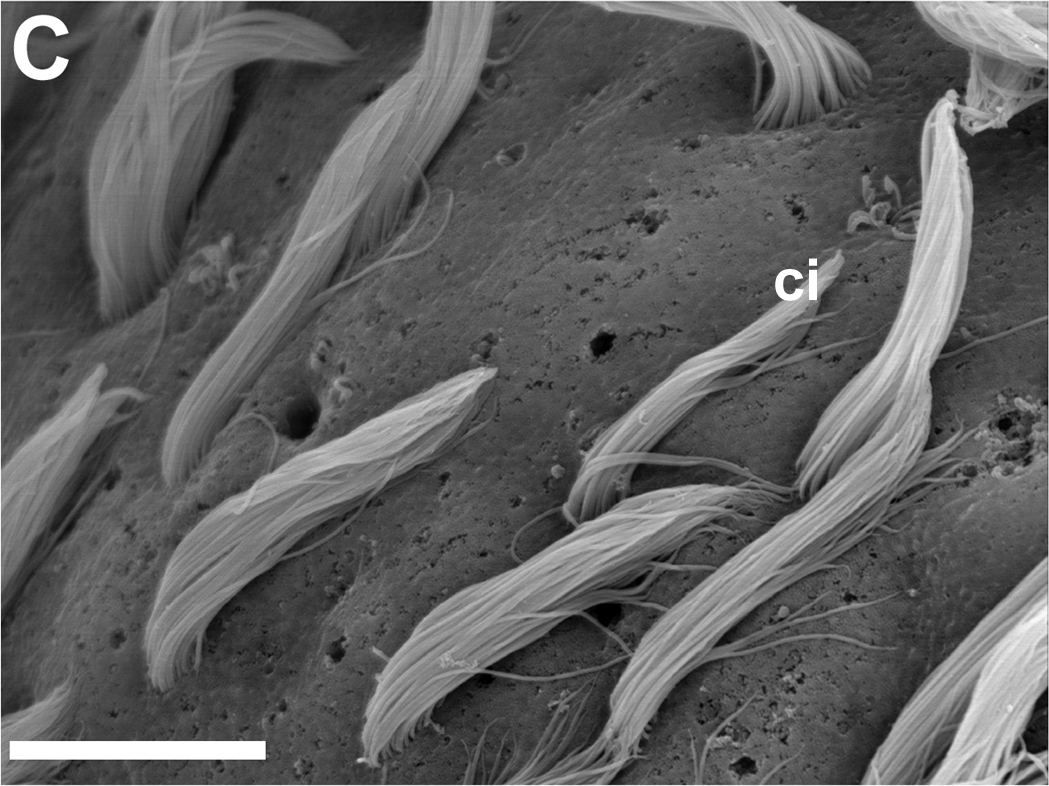
A high-power SEM image showing cilia extending from a common pore: Also evident are pores lacking obvious bunched cilia. Scale bar is 10 μm. ci - numerous long cilia

== Comparison with oral tentacles ==
In A. californica, the oral tentacles, which are situated in a more ventral position, are possibly involved in contact chemoreception and mechanoreception.
