= Acanthodoris globosa =

Scientific classification
- Kingdom: Animalia
- Phylum: Mollusca
- Class: Gastropoda
- Order: Nudibranchia
- Superfamily: Onchidoridoidea
- Family: Acanthodorididae
- Genus: Acanthodoris
- Species: A. globosa

Binomial name
- Acanthodoris globosa Abraham, 1877

Species of gastropod

Acanthodoris globosa is a species of sea slug, a dorid nudibranch, a shell-less marine gastropod mollusc in the family Acanthodorididae.

== Distribution ==
This species was described from New Zealand. It has not been reported since the original description.
