= Acanthodoris nanega =

Scientific classification
- Kingdom: Animalia
- Phylum: Mollusca
- Class: Gastropoda
- Order: Nudibranchia
- Family: Acanthodorididae
- Genus: Acanthodoris
- Species: A. nanega

Binomial name
- Acanthodoris nanega Burn, 1969

Species of gastropod

Acanthodoris nanega is a species of sea slugs, a dorid nudibranch, a shell-less marine gastropod mollusc in the family Acanthodorididae.

== Distribution ==
This species was described from Victoria, Australia. It is found on shore and in shallow water to 30 m depth.
