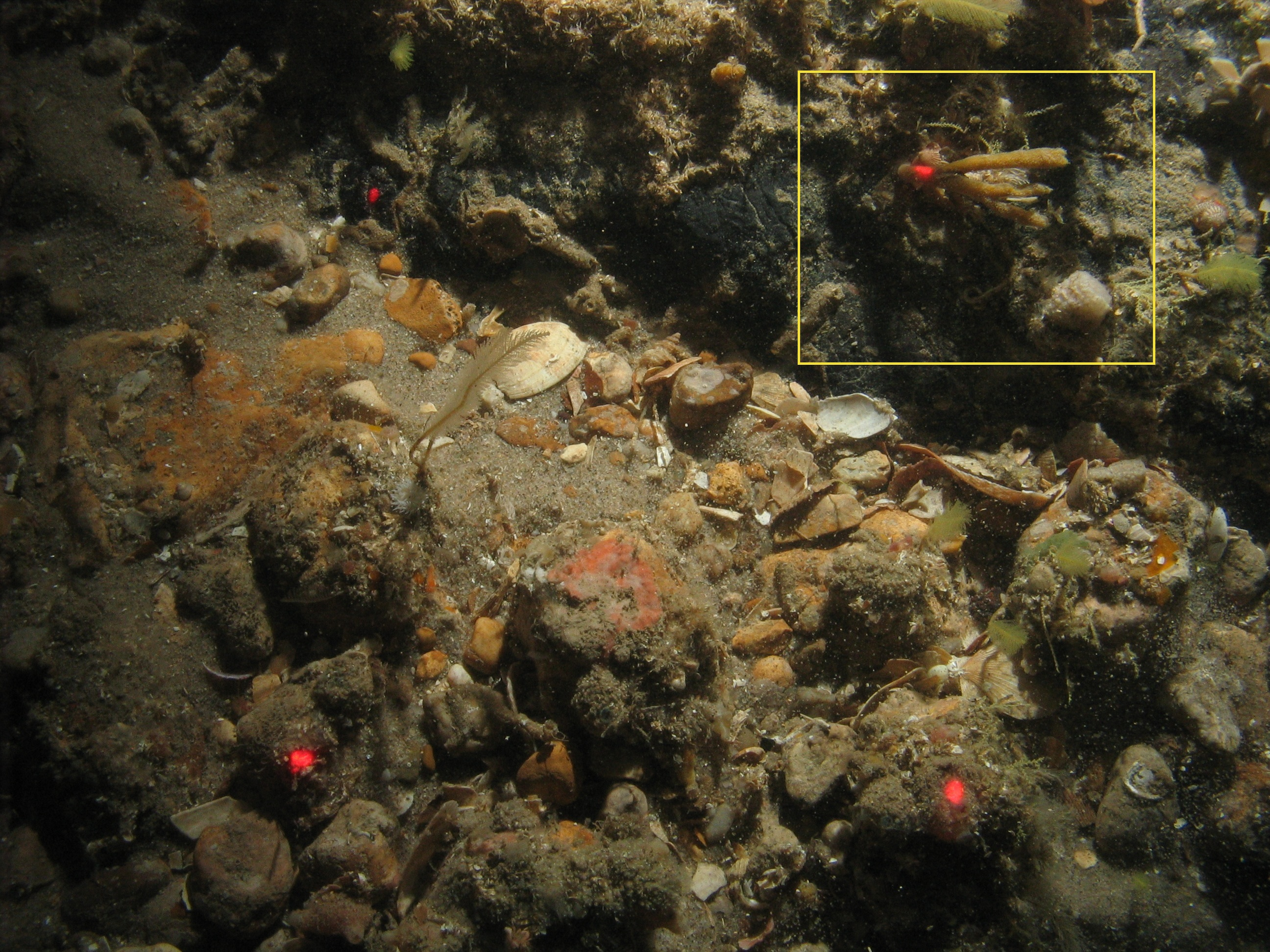
- Seabed image with the sea chervil indicated

Scientific classification
- Domain: Eukaryota
- Kingdom: Animalia
- Phylum: Bryozoa
- Class: Gymnolaemata
- Order: Ctenostomatida
- Family: Alcyonidiidae
- Genus: Alcyonidium
- Species: A. diaphanum

Binomial name
- Alcyonidium diaphanum (Hudson, 1778)

= Alcyonidium diaphanum =

Species of moss animal

Alcyonidium diaphanum, commonly called the sea-chervil (after the herb which it resembles), is a species of bryozoan found in the North Atlantic. It can cause a rash known as "Dogger Bank itch" when handled for prolonged periods.
