= Dogger Bank itch =

- Specialty: Dermatology

Dogger Bank itch is a cutaneous condition characterized by a long-lasting dermatitis caused by exposure to the sea chervil, Alcyonidium diaphanum, a bryozoan. The disease, common in fishermen who work in the North Sea, has been recognized by the Danish Workman's Compensation Act since 1939.

== Signs and symptoms ==
Signs of Dogger Bank itch can be found mainly on the arms, wrists, hands, insides of elbows but can spread if the affected person doesn't take prevention measures. The symptoms are rashes and inflammation, cracking of the skin, redness in the area, pus leaking from aforementioned cracks, and intense itching of the area.

== Pathogenesis ==
The structural formula of the toxin responsible for Dogger Bank itch

The rash is caused by a type of cell-mediated hypersensitivity reaction; this type of hypersensitivity normally occurs in people who become sensitized to volatile organic compounds. Although in some instances several years may be required to develop sensitivity, this time period may vary greatly depending on the individual. In Dogger Bank itch, sensitivity is acquired after repeated handling of the sea chervils that become entangled in fishing nets.

The specific toxin responsible for the rash was determined to be the sulfur-bearing salt (2-hydroxyethyl) dimethylsulfoxonium chloride. This salt is also found in some sea sponges and has potent in vitro activity against leukemia cells.

== Treatment ==
A study of two cases in 2001 suggests that the rash responds to oral ciclosporin. Initial treatment with oral and topical steroids failed.

== Epidemiology ==
The causative agent, A. diaphanum (formerly A. gelatinosum), is a bryozoan, a class of animals consisting of minute, sessile, filter-feeding animals that live in colonies. A. diaphanum is a gelatinous, smooth, sponge-like colony up to 15–30 cm (6–12 in) long, growing on rocks and shells from lower shore down to approximately 100 m (330 ft); superficially, they resemble seaweed. The distribution of this animal is from the North Sea to the Mediterranean.

The disease is especially prevalent among trawlermen working in the Dogger Bank, an important fishing bank in the North Sea. It has also been reported from the Baie de la Seine in France.

== History ==
A medical case reported in 1957 tells of a fishing captain who worked in the Dogger Bank in the North Sea. The sea chervil, abundant in the area, frequently came up with the fishing nets and had to be thrown back into the water. After doing this repeatedly, the captain "developed an itching red eruption on the flexor aspects of the elbows and forearms which became moist, oozed serum, and spread to involve the backs of the hands, fingers and most of the arms within a few days." Although the rash disappeared after leaving the area, it reappeared with greater severity when he returned and performed the same activities; this time the rash spread to his neck and face, and continued to ooze serum for two months.

== See also ==
- Seaweed dermatitis
