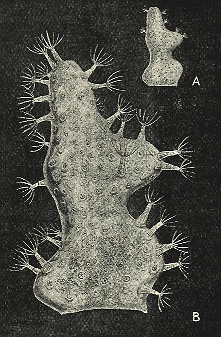
- Alcyonidium gelatinosum

Scientific classification
- Kingdom: Animalia
- Phylum: Bryozoa
- Class: Gymnolaemata
- Order: Ctenostomatida
- Family: Alcyonidiidae

= Alcyonidiidae =

Family of bryozoans

Alcyonidiidae is a family of bryozoans belonging to the order Ctenostomatida.

Genera:

- Alcyonidioides d'Hondt, 2001
- Alcyonidium Lamouroux, 1813
- Bockiella Silén, 1942
- Demafinga Cuffey, Dodge & Skema, 2014
- Halodactyle Farre
- Halodactylus Farre, 1837
- Lobiancopora Pergens, 1889
- Paralcyonidium Okada, 1925
- Syringothenia Obut, 1953
