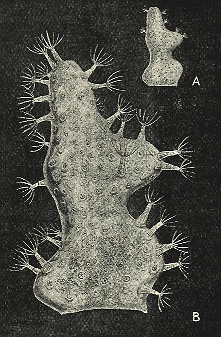
- Alcyonidium gelatinosum

Scientific classification
- Kingdom: Animalia
- Phylum: Bryozoa
- Class: Gymnolaemata
- Order: Ctenostomatida
- Family: Alcyonidiidae
- Genus: Alcyonidium; J.V.F. Lamouroux, 1813

Species
- See text

= Alcyonidium (bryozoan) =

Genus of moss animals

Alcyonidium is a genus of bryozoans in the order Ctenostomatida. The genus have both species with planktotrophic (feeding) larvae and short-lived lecithotrophic (non-feeding) larvae.

== Species ==
The following species are included in the genus by the World Register of Marine Species:-

- Alcyonidium adustum Winston & Hayward, 2012
- Alcyonidium albescens Winston & Key, 1999
- Alcyonidium albidum Alder, 1857
- Alcyonidium androsovae d'Hondt, 1983
- Alcyonidium anglei d'Hondt & Goyffon, 1991
- Alcyonidium antarcticum Waters, 1904
- Alcyonidium argyllaceum Castric-Fey, 1971
- Alcyonidium australe d'Hondt & Moyano, 1979
- Alcyonidium candidum Ryland, 1963
- Alcyonidium capronae Winston & Hakansson, 1986
- Alcyonidium cellarioides Calvet, 1900
- Alcyonidium chondroides O'Donoghue & de Watteville, 1937
- Alcyonidium columbianum O'Donoghue & O'Donoghue, 1926
- Alcyonidium condylocinereum Porter, 2004
- Alcyonidium diaphanum (Hudson, 1778)
- Alcyonidium disciforme Smitt, 1872
- Alcyonidium duplex Prouho, 1892
- Alcyonidium effusum Norman, 1909
- Alcyonidium eightsi Winston & Hayward, 1994
- Alcyonidium enteromorpha Soule, 1951
- Alcyonidium epispiculum Porter & Hayward, 2004
- Alcyonidium erectum Silén, 1942
- Alcyonidium excavatum Hincks, 1880
- Alcyonidium exiguum Vieira, Migotto & Winston, 2014
- Alcyonidium flabelliforme Kirkpatrick, 1902
- Alcyonidium flustroides Busk, 1886
- Alcyonidium foliaceum Silén, 1942
- Alcyonidium gelatinosum (Linnaeus, 1761)
- Alcyonidium hauffi Marcus, 1939
- Alcyonidium hirsutum (Fleming, 1828)
- Alcyonidium hydrocoalitum Porter, 2004
- Alcyonidium irregulare Kluge, 1962
- Alcyonidium kermadecense Gordon, 1984
- Alcyonidium lutosum Winston & Hayward, 2012
- Alcyonidium maculosum Winston & Hayward, 2012
- Alcyonidium mamillatum Alder, 1857
- Alcyonidium multigemmatum Gordon, 1986
- Alcyonidium nanum Silén, 1942
- Alcyonidium nipponicum d'Hondt & Mawatari, 1986
- Alcyonidium nodosum O'Donoghue & de Watteville, 1944
- Alcyonidium nostoch (A.P.de Candolle) Lamouroux, 1813
- Alcyonidium pachydermatum Denisenko, 1996
- Alcyonidium papillatum O'Donoghue, 1924
- Alcyonidium parasiticum (Fleming, 1828)
- Alcyonidium pedunculatum Robertson, 1902
- Alcyonidium pelagosphaerum Porter & Hayward, 2004
- Alcyonidium polyoum (Hassall, 1841)
- Alcyonidium polypylum Marcus, 1941
- Alcyonidium proboscideum Kluge, 1962
- Alcyonidium protoseideum
- Alcyonidium pseudodisciforme Denisenko, 2009
- Alcyonidium pulvinatum Vieira, Migotto & Winston, 2014
- Alcyonidium radicellatum Kluge, 1946
- Alcyonidium rhomboidale O'Donoghue, 1924
- Alcyonidium rylandi d'Hondt & Goyffon, 2005
- Alcyonidium sagamianum Mawatari, 1953
- Alcyonidium sanguineum Cook, 1985
- Alcyonidium scolecoideum Porter & Hayward, 2004
- Alcyonidium shizuoi d'Hondt & Mawatari, 1986
- Alcyonidium simulatum Porter & Hayward, 2004
- Alcyonidium torpedo d'Hondt, 2006
- Alcyonidium torquatum Vieira, Migotto & Winston, 2014
- Alcyonidium variegatum Prouho, 1892
- Alcyonidium vermiculare Okada, 1925
- Alcyonidium verrilli Osburn, 1912
- Alcyonidium vicarians d'Hondt & Chimenz Gusso, 2006
- Alcyonidium vitreum Vieira, Migotto & Winston, 2014
