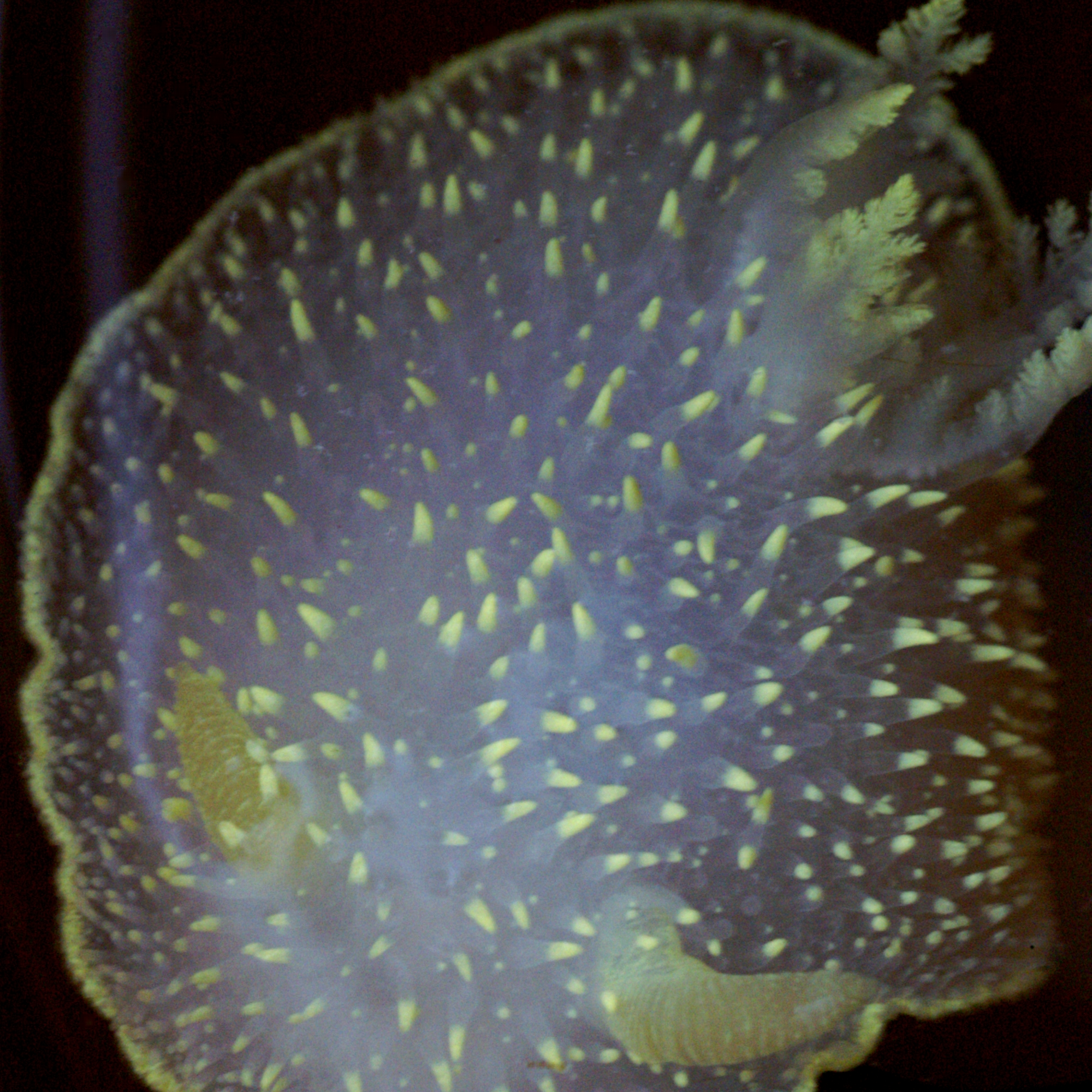
- Acanthodoris hudsoni

Scientific classification
- Kingdom: Animalia
- Phylum: Mollusca
- Class: Gastropoda
- Order: Nudibranchia
- Superfamily: Onchidoridoidea
- Family: Acanthodorididae; P. Fischer, 1883

Synonyms
- Acanthodoridinae P. Fischer, 1883 superseded rank

= Acanthodorididae =

Family of gastropods

Acanthodorididae is a family of sea slugs, dorid nudibranchs, shell-less marine gastropod mollusks in the superfamily Onchidoridoidea.

== Characteristics ==
(Original description in French) The body is depressed and oval. The dorsal surface is covered with a villous or papillose texture. The rhinophores (sensory organs) are retractile into a lobed cavity. The head is large and veliform (sail-like), bearing short, lobiform tentacles. The gill apparatus is composed of tripinnate leaflets arranged in a circular pattern.

The labial armature (jaw) is composed of small hooks. The radula lacks a central tooth; instead, it features one very large, hook-shaped lateral tooth and a few smaller marginal teeth.

== Genera ==
- Acanthodoris J. E. Gray, 1850
