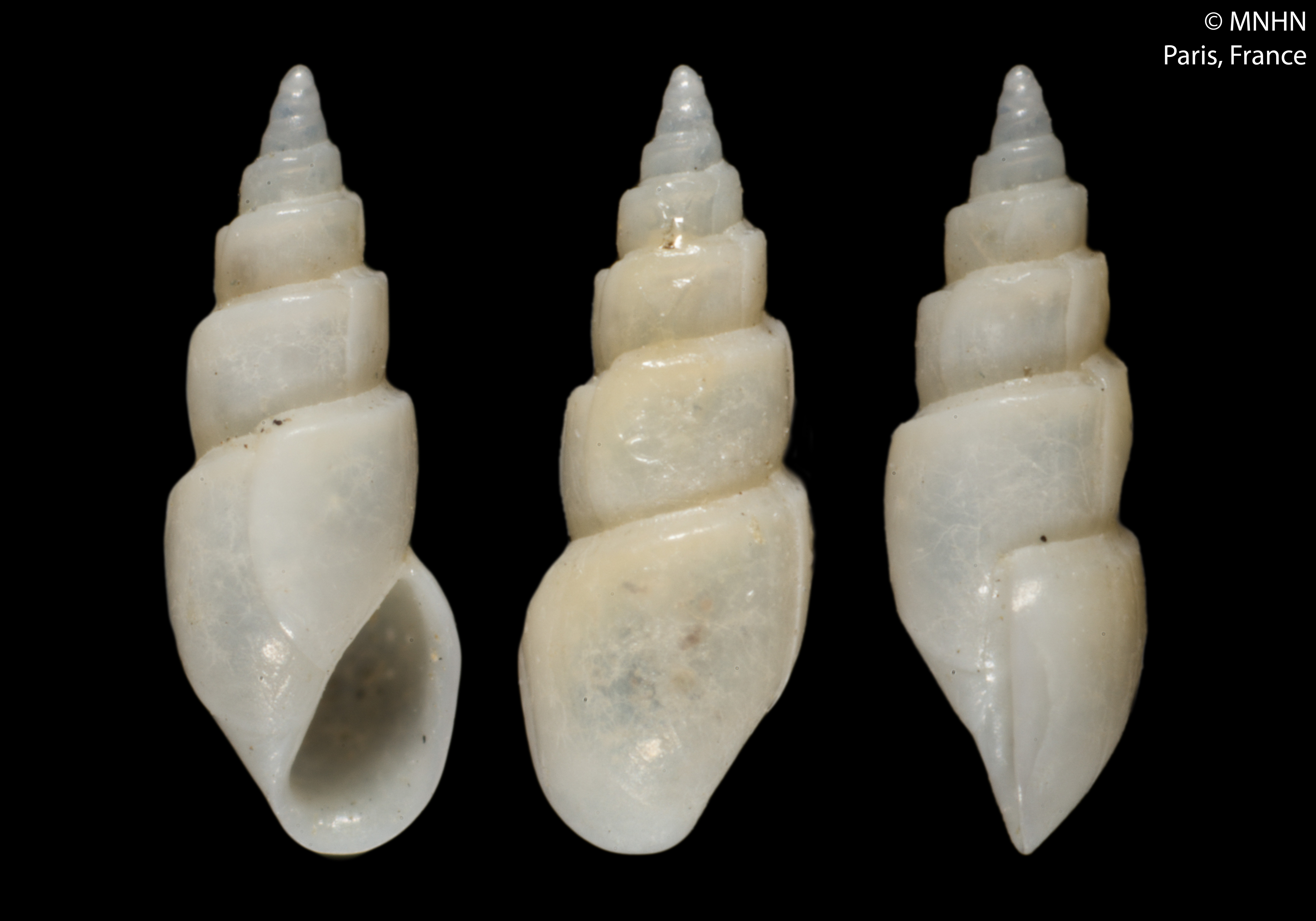
- Shell of Oceanida graduata. Origin: Guadeloupe, syntype at National Museum of Natural History, France

Scientific classification
- Kingdom: Animalia
- Phylum: Mollusca
- Class: Gastropoda
- Subclass: Caenogastropoda
- Order: Littorinimorpha
- Superfamily: Vanikoroidea
- Family: Eulimidae
- Genus: Oceanida de Folin, 1870

Type species
- Oceanida graduata de Folin, 1871

Synonyms
- Athleenia Bartsch, 1946; Spiroclimax Mörch, 1875

= Oceanida =

Genus of gastropods

Oceanida is a genus of very small parasitic sea snails, marine gastropod mollusks or micromollusks in the family Eulimidae.

This genus was described by Léopold de Folin in 1870. These are subtidal snails that are parasitic on echinoderms. Their length varies between 2 and 3 mm.

== Description ==
(Originally described in Latin as Spiroclimax) The shell exhibits a subcylindrical form, characterized by transparency and a suture that resembles a gently descending spiral staircase. The aperture displays an auriculate shape. The outer lip is thickened, featuring a sigmoidally margined profile that curves inward towards the suture. The columella is moderately thick, adorned with a funicular cord and exhibiting minimal plication. The protoconch is polished and positioned at a right angle.

== Species ==
Species within this genus include:

- Oceanida abrejosensis Bartsch, 1917
- Oceanida confluens Bouchet & Warén, 1986
- Oceanida corallina Hedley, 1912
- Oceanida faberi De Jong & Coomans, 1988 - the common labeo - found from Aruba to Northeast Brazil.
- Oceanida farica (Bartsch, 1915)
- Oceanida graduata de Folin, 1871 - the shouldered eulima - distributed in North America; Western Atlantic Ocean; synonyms : Spiroclimax scalaris Mörch, 1875; Athleenia burryi Bartsch, 1946
- Oceanida hypolysina Melvill, 1904
- Oceanida inglei Lyons, 1978 - distributed in North America; Western Atlantic Ocean
- Oceanida lampra Melvill, 1918
- Oceanida mindoroensis Adams & Reeve, 1850
- Oceanida pumila A. Adams, 1864

Species brought into synonymy

- Oceanida burryi (Bartsch, 1946): synonym of Oceanida graduata de Folin, 1871
- Oceanida catalinensis (Bartsch, 1920) : synonym of Pseudosabinella bakeri (Bartsch, 1917)
- Oceanida lepida (A. Adams, 1864): synonym of Leiostraca pygmaea A. Adams, 1864
- Oceanida ovalis de Folin, 1884: synonym of Doliella nitens' (Jeffreys, 1870)
- Oceanida tumerae Laseron, 1955: unpublished combination for Hebeulima tumere Laseron, 1955)
- Oceanida scalaris (Mörch, 1875): synonym of Oceanida graduata de Folin, 1871
- Oceanida whitechurchi Turton, 1932: synonym of Oceanida farica (Bartsch, 1915)
