= Timber pilings =

Building foundations

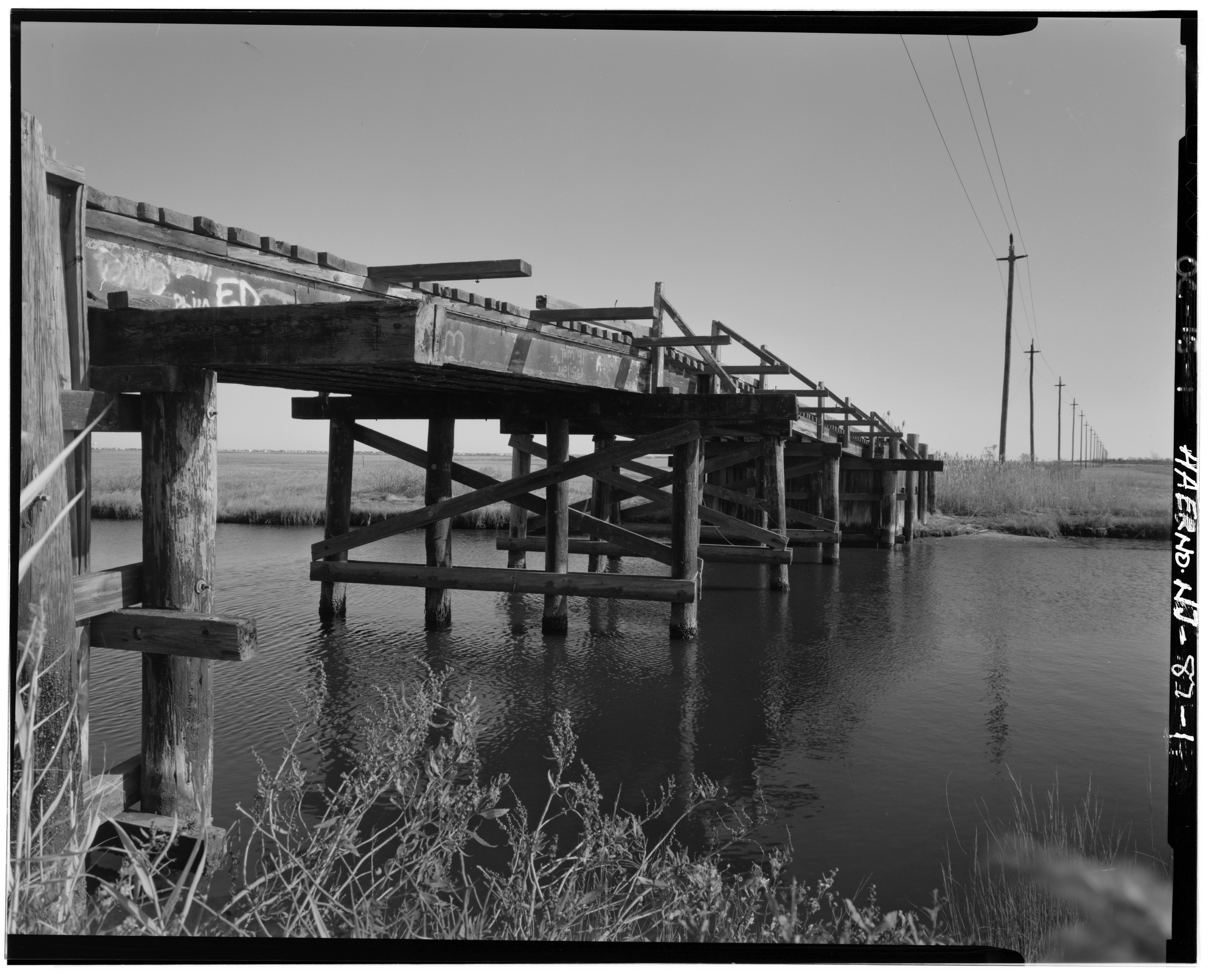
Timber-pile bridge with steel stringers, New Jersey

Timber pilings serve as the foundations of many historic structures such as canneries, wharves, and shore buildings. The old pilings present challenging problems during restoration as they age and are destroyed by organisms and decay. Replacing the foundation entirely is possible but expensive. Regularly inspecting and maintaining timber piles may extend the life of the foundation.

== Historic use and treatment in water ==
Timber pile construction in the aquatic and marine environment has a long history in Europe dating as far back as the bronze and Stone Age in Switzerland. Similar technologies are known to have existed in East Asia, from the c.5000-3300 BC, the Hemudu culture, of Zhejiang Province, being noted for its use of Stilt houses.

=== Swiss lake dwellers ===
During severe droughts in Switzerland in the mid-nineteenth century, lake areas that had been previously inundated with water were exposed to reveal ancient archaeological remains of various types of timber piling support assemblies that served as foundations for both individual houses and community buildings. The design of these timber assemblies varied by the time of occupation, whether during the bronze or Stone Age, and also by geological conditions where the timbers rested.

The communities were called the Swiss Lake Dwellers and were located in various fresh water lakes around Zürich and other areas in Switzerland. During the archaeological excavations, many of the piles dissolved after being in contact with air.

=== Early building piling foundations in Venice, Italy ===
In Venice, some of the early piling foundations were built on timber piles. The early Venetian constructors used building techniques that included using impermeable stone supported by wooden rafts and timber piles. The timber piles did not rot because they were set into the mud at the bottom of the lagoon which prevented oxygen and harmful microbes from reaching them.

== Historic treatment and preservation in marine waters ==
=== Treatment methods used prior to 18th century ===
Over 2,000 years ago, wood builders were aware of marine borers and decay and protected wood using crude extracts and various chemicals. Further study on how to address marine borer activity and decay accelerated in the 18th century.

=== Treatment methods revived in 18th & 19th centuries ===
In the 18th and 19th centuries the study of wood preservation was revived due to the deterioration of the timber pile dikes that protected Holland as well as the high level of decay and marine borer activity in English Navy ships. The early dikes in Holland were supported by timber piles. Creosote derived from coal processing, was discovered in the mid-18th century to prevent timber pile decay. The development of Creosote pressure treatment by John Bethel was also an important advancement in timber piling construction. Historic buildings supported by timber piles may either be treated with creosote or chromated copper arsenate.

== Types of wood used ==
In the United States, Douglas-Fir timber piles are used most often in the Pacific Northwest while Southern Pine are used most commonly on the East Coast. Douglas-Fir is used most commonly on the west coast due to its high strength, renewability and low cost.

== Piling deterioration problems ==
=== Marine borers ===
There are three groups of marine borers in West Coast waters including gribbles, shipworms, and pholads, and each differs in the type of damage it causes.

==== Gribbles ====
A Gribble (Limnoria) is a destructive crustacean that burrows into the wood surfaces. Unlike other marine borers, gribbles travel easily from timber to timber using the wood for food and shelter. Gribbles burrow to a shallow depth but can still reduce pile diameter by one inch per year; a gribble infested pile typically has an hour-glass shape at the tide line.

==== Shipworms ====
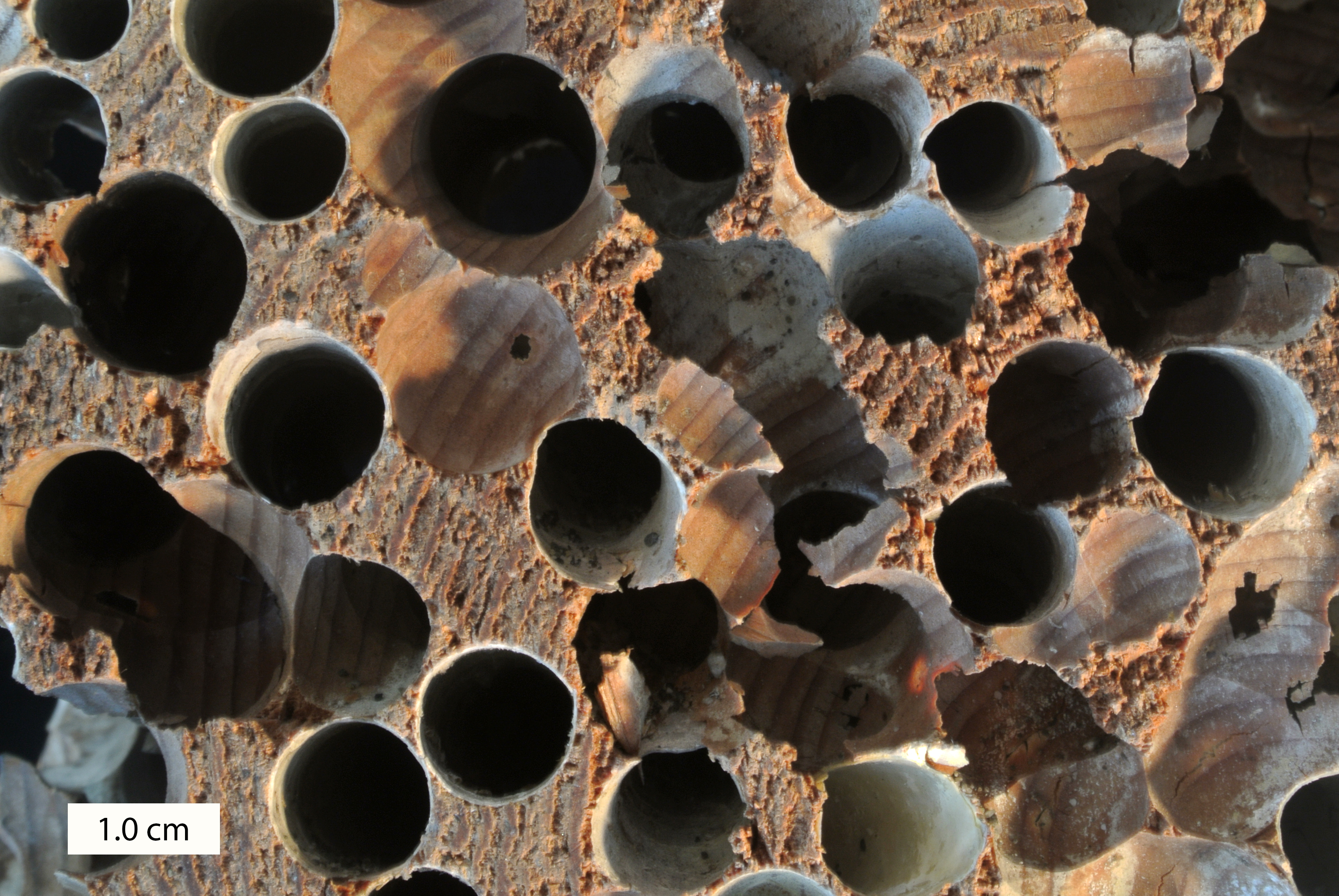
Teredolites 012416

Shipworms (Teredolite) are wood-boring bivalves that burrow deeply into submerged wood. Although piles attacked by shipworms may appear sound on the surface, they may be completely riddled with a maze of tunnels. Shipworms can spread to new wood only when they are in the free-swimming larval stage. Once they attack and bore into the wood, they become imprisoned within it. Ancient mariners, realizing that shipworms were imprisoned in the wood of their ships, would sail far up river and remain in fresh water for a number of months to kill the shipworms. Experienced divers look for siphons that project from the wood or use sonic devices to estimate the extent of internal damage. Shipworm and gribble attacks can also be detected by immersing untreated wood panels and destructively sampling them at monthly intervals.

==== Pholads ====
Pholads, rock-burrowing clams, burrow into and damage untreated wood in warmer waters near Hawaii and Mexico and along Oregon beaches boring only into the surface of the wood. Ensuring that the shell of the wood is undamaged will keep this Pholad borer at bay.

=== Insects ===
Wood above the waterline may be attacked by a number of insects, including termites, carpenter ants, and beetles. One beetle, the wharf borer (Nacedes melanura), can attack untreated or damaged treated hardwoods and conifers with high moisture contents by tunneling extensively and leaving behind dark brown fecal matter that further degrades the wood.

=== Wood decay ===
Wood decay describes wood in all stages of fungal attack, from the initial invasion of hyphae into the cell walls to the complete destruction of the wood. Wood-inhabiting fungi are most common on timber piles above the water surface since the lack of oxygen below water inhibits fungal growth.

==== Methods of detecting decay ====
Incipient decay may develop in untreated pile tops within 1 year and reach the visible, advanced stage, termed rot, within 2 to 4 years and can extend 4 feet or more from the internally rotting areas of a Douglas-fir pile. A triangular blade scraper, a sharp shovel, or a dull probe are useful when inspecting piles for surface deterioration or marine borer attack because they allow the inspector to estimate the depth of deterioration. Because untreated wood can often be exposed while these tools are being used, a preservative solution or paste should be applied to exposed areas.

=== Cracks ===
Cracks that have developed after the wood has been treated are highly susceptible to borers, insects and decay in the right conditions. Cracks need to be evaluated during an initial pile inspection to ascertain depth, location and treatment condition.

== Decay treatment options ==
=== Liquid preservatives ===
Apply a liquid preservative to cutoff tops of piles and timbers by flooding them with hot creosote (150 to 200 °F), pentachlorophenol in diesel oil, or copper naphthenate in mineral spirits.

=== Solid preservatives ===
A solid preservative, such as Fluor-Chrome-Arsenic-Phenol (FCAP), can be applied dry or as a paste where hawsers rip off caps and expose wood to moisture and decay organisms.

== Borer attack treatment options ==
=== Creosote, CCA, and ACA ===
Creosote effectively prevents attack by marine borers in coastal waters north of San Francisco and inorganic salts [Chromated Copper Arsenate (CCA) or Ammoniacal Copper Arsenate (ACA) are recommended south of San Francisco because of the likelihood of attack by the wood borer that is predominantly located in warmer waters.

=== Barriers and plastic wraps ===
Impermeable barriers can protect preservative-treated wood piles under the waterline from marine borer attack by inhibiting the entry of borers into the wood and creating anaerobic conditions that kill established borers by limiting the available oxygen.

=== Wood and concrete reinforcement ===
A heavily damaged piling structure can be reinforced by cutting out the damaged section and replacing it with preservative-treated wood. Wrapping piles with plastic barriers can provide protection from marine borers for 25 years or more. Pile reinforcement with concrete can be sufficient by filling the void with coarse stone and mortar. Where damage is more severe, forms made of metal, wood, concrete, woven nylon, or pitch-impregnated fiber are attached to the pile as far down as 2 feet below the mudline.

== Required maintenance & inspection ==
=== Inspection interval ===
In order to effectively preserve and maintain timber piles, regular inspection is required to detect deteriorating structures before replacement is necessary. Pile inspections should take place every five years.

== Inspect pilings removed from service ==
One of the best ways to ascertain the cause of deterioration as well as what stage the deterioration is in, is to inspect a piling that has been removed from service. The loss of one piling used for inspection might save the remaining timber pilings and members from being replaced. In order to diagnose the problems, cut the timbers into short sections and longitudinally split each section in order to see how far the preservative has penetrated. Reuse of any treated timber pile supplied by an outside source is not recommended. Not knowing the applied treatment, past use, or if diesel fuels have been applied to the surface used to give the appearance of a recent retreatment could decrease the life of the pile. Some unscrupulous suppliers of used timber piles should be avoided, because some contractors have applied diesel fuel to the outside of the piles to bring the embedded creosote to the surface.

== See also ==
Deep foundation
