= Petricolaria dactylus =

Scientific classification
- Kingdom: Animalia
- Phylum: Mollusca
- Class: Bivalvia
- Order: Venerida
- Superfamily: Veneroidea
- Family: Veneridae
- Genus: Petricolaria
- Species: P. dactylus

Binomial name
- Petricolaria dactylus (Sowerby I, 1823)

Synonyms
- Petricola patagonica D'Orbingy, 1845

Species of bivalve

Petricolaria dactylus, common name petricola, is a species of saltwater clam, a marine bivalve mollusk in the family Veneridae, the Venus clams.

== Habitat and distribution ==
Petricolaria dactylus is a perforating species of substrates such as sandstone and stony bottoms. This species is native to the eastern coast of South America from Uruguay to the Patagonian Atlantic coast.
