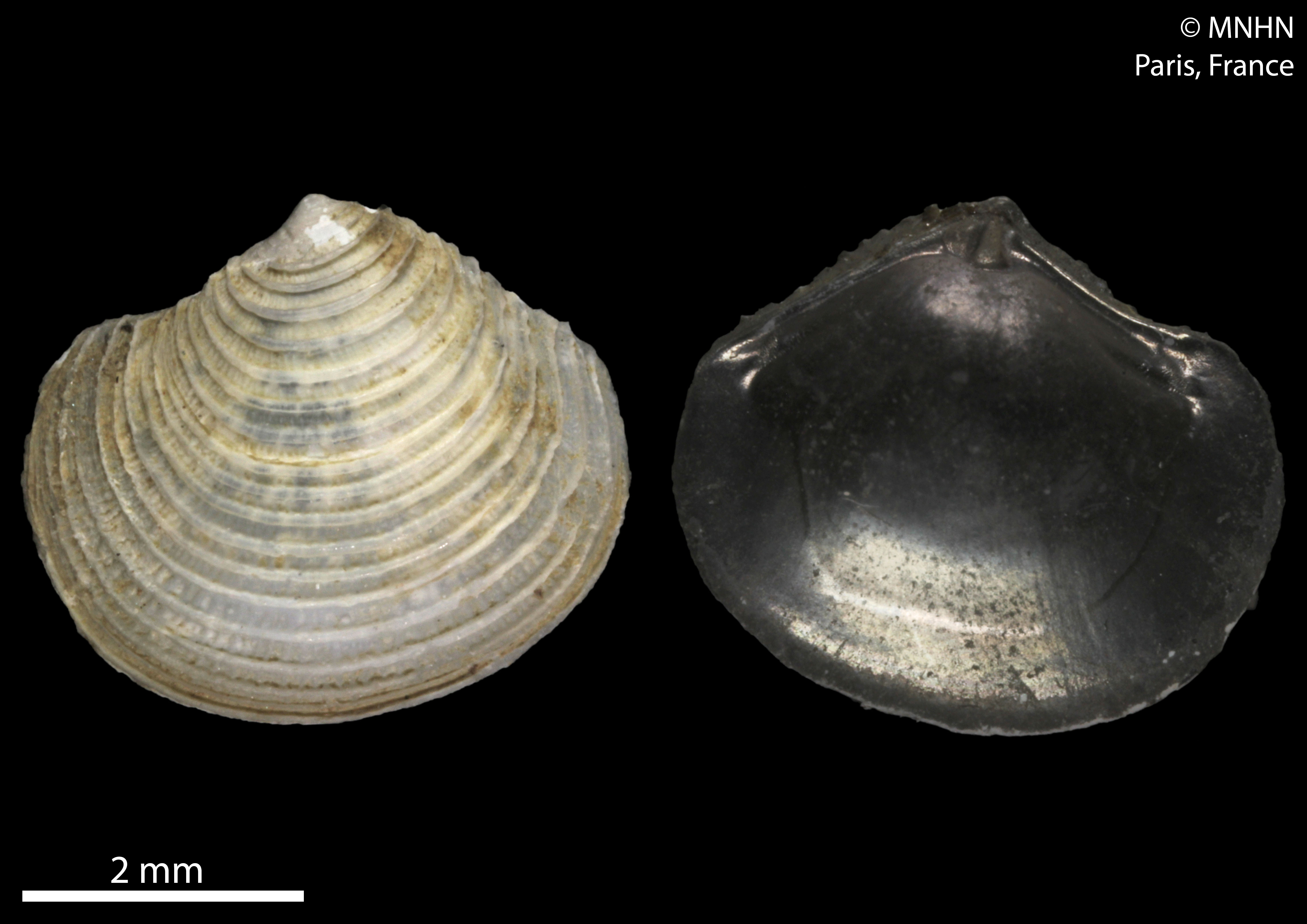
- Myrtea catonii

Scientific classification
- Kingdom: Animalia
- Phylum: Mollusca
- Class: Bivalvia
- Order: Lucinida
- Family: Lucinidae
- Subfamily: Myrteinae
- Genus: Myrtea; W. Turton, 1822

Type species
- Venus spinifera Montagu, 1803

Synonyms
- Lucina (Myrtea) W. Turton, 1822; Mirtea Monterosato, 1891; Myrtaea Dall, 1901; Phacoides (Myrtea) (W. Turton, 1822)

= Myrtea =

Myrtea Temporal range: Cretaceous–present

Genus of bivalves

Myrtea is a genus of bivalves, marine molluscs in the family Lucinidae.

== Description ==
Members of the genus have an oval-trangulate, nearly equilateral shell. The hinge of one valve has a single tooth and two lateral teeth, with two teeth on the opposing valve with lateral teeth obscured.

== Taxonomy ==
Elliptotellina was first described by William Turton in 1822.

== Distribution ==
The genus has a global distribution, with fossils of the Myrtea dating back to the Cretaceous period.

== Species ==
Species within the genus Myrtea include:

- Myrtea ada (A. Adams & Angas, 1864)
- Myrtea amorpha (Sturany, 1896)
- Myrtea bractea Hedley, 1911
- † Myrtea butonensis (Beets, 1942)
- Myrtea catonii (Glover & J. D. Taylor, 2016)
- † Myrtea dijki (K. Martin, 1885)
- † Myrtea ezoensis (Nagao, 1938)
- Myrtea fabula (Reeve, 1850)
- Myrtea fabuloides (Tate, 1886)
- † Myrtea faseolata Darragh, 1994
- Myrtea flabelliformis (Prashad, 1932)
- † Myrtea haurangiensis Vella, 1954
- Myrtea hyphalosa Glover & J. D. Taylor, 2016
- Myrtea investigatoris Cosel & Bouchet, 2008
- † Myrtea maoria A. W. B. Powell, 1935
- Myrtea mayi (Gatliff & Gabriel, 1911)
- † Myrtea microlirata (H. J. Finlay & Marwick, 1937)
- † Myrtea papatikiensis Marwick, 1926
- Myrtea paupera (Tate, 1892)
- Myrtea perfecta (Glover & J. D. Taylor, 2016)
- Myrtea pseudocorbis (Nicklès, 1952)
- Myrtea scitula (A. Adams, 1854)
- † Myrtea sera Marwick, 1965
- † Myrtea serana (P. J. Fischer, 1921)
- Myrtea soyoae (Habe, 1953)
- Myrtea spinifera (Montagu, 1803)
- † Myrtea staminifera (Marwick, 1929)
- Myrtea sudes (Barnard, 1964)
- † Myrtea supraflexa (Marwick, 1931)
- Myrtea tanimbarensis Cosel & Bouchet, 2008
- Myrtea toamasina Pacaud, Coppini, Buisson & F. Meunier, 2024
- Myrtea triclotae Cosel & Bouchet, 2008
- † Myrtea valdesculpta Marwick, 1943
- † Myrtea waltonensis J. A. Gardner, 1926

== Gallery ==
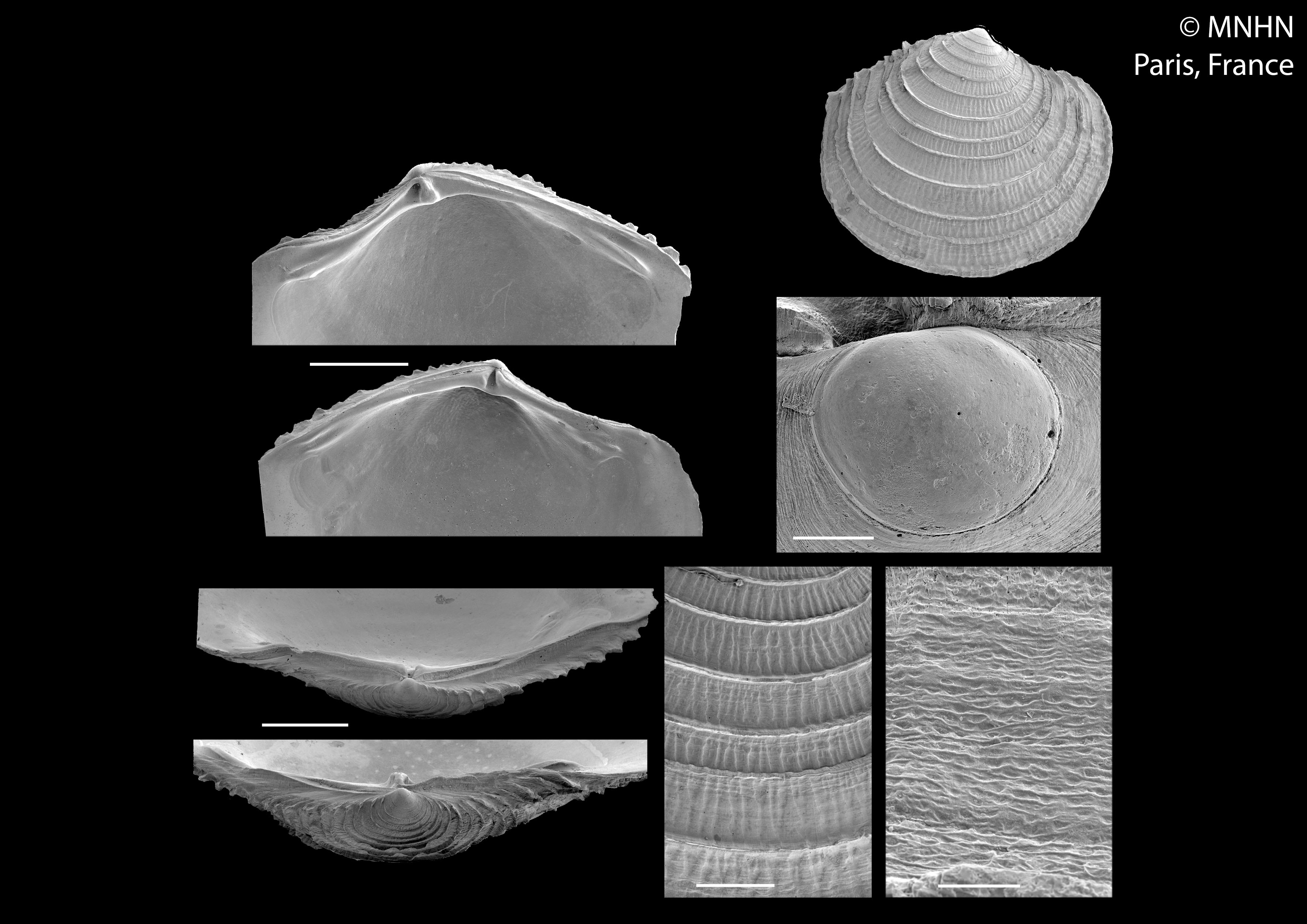
M. fabula

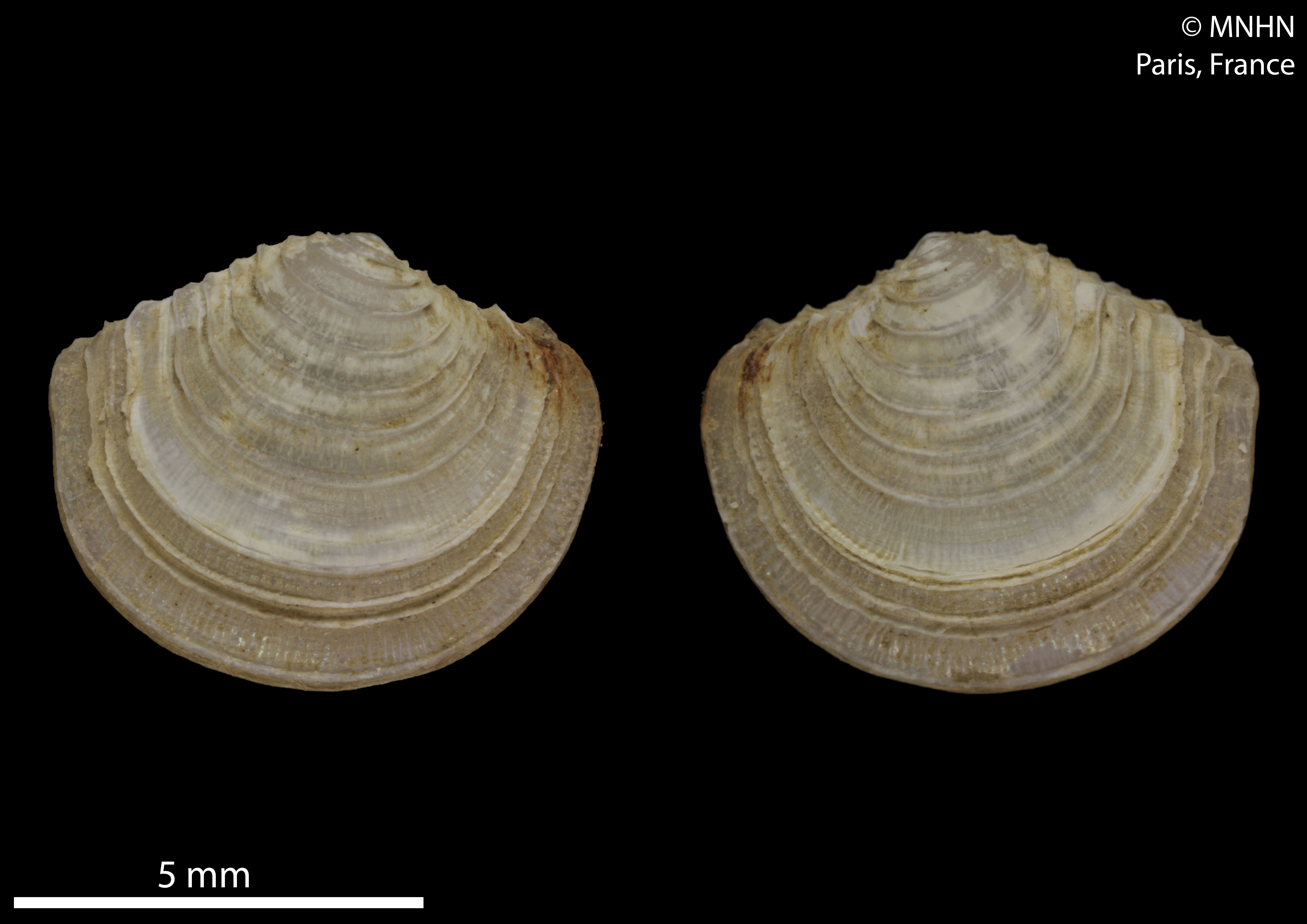
M. flabelliformis

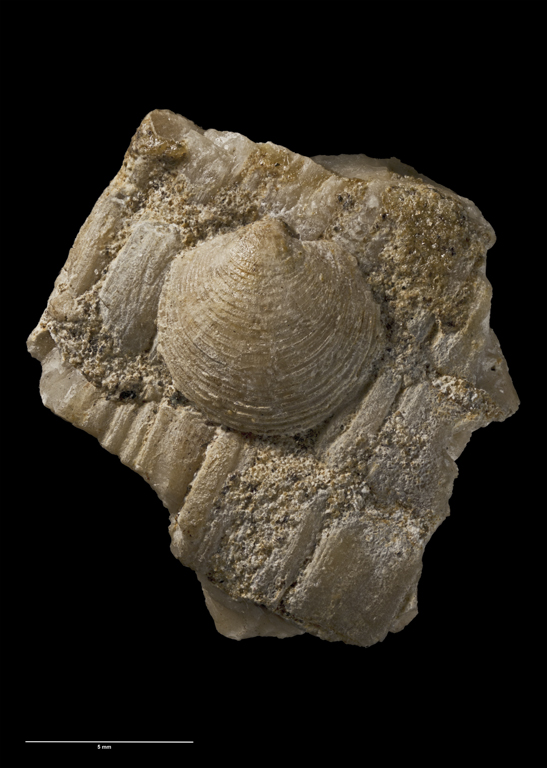
M. microlirata

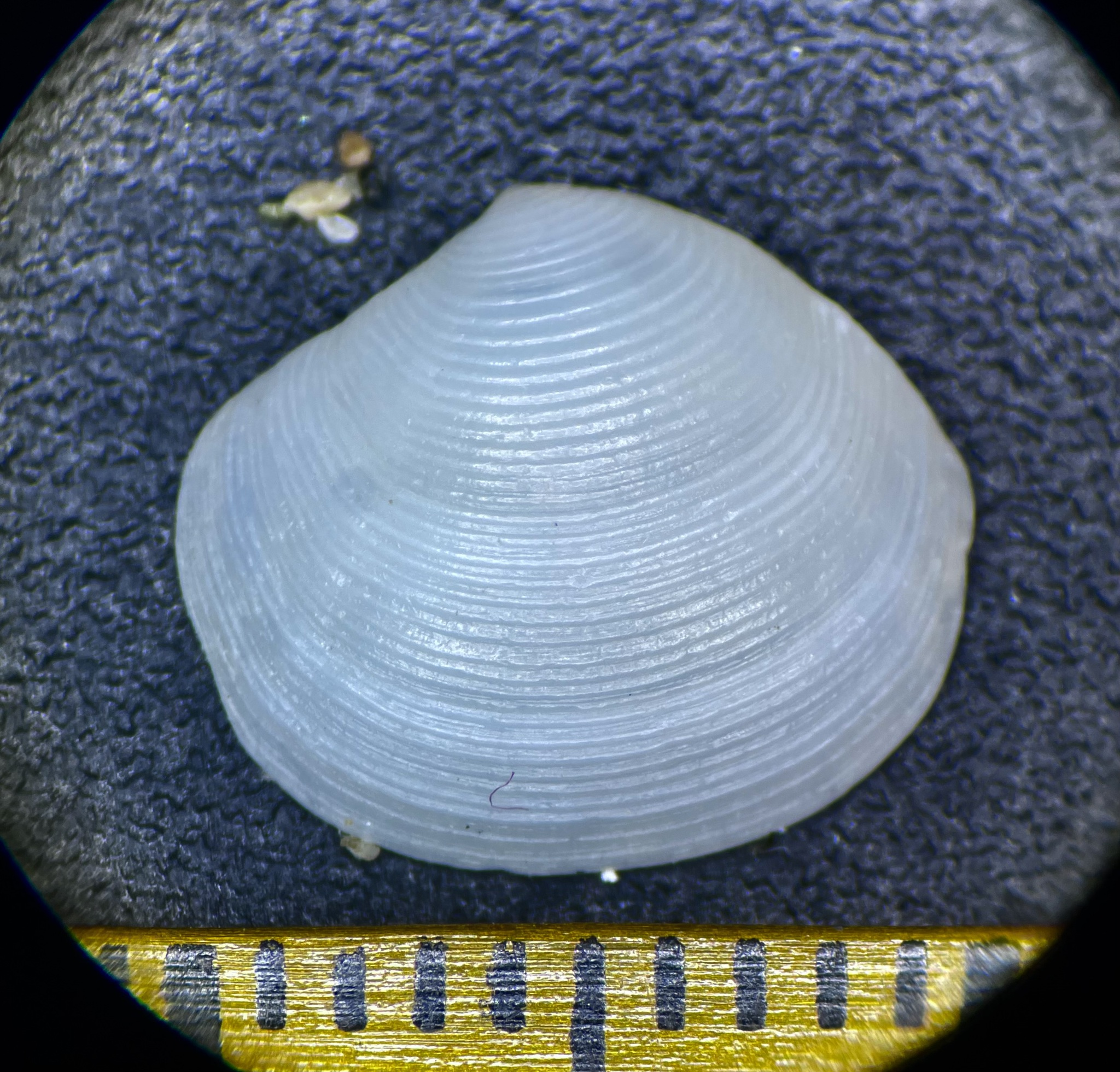
M. spinifera

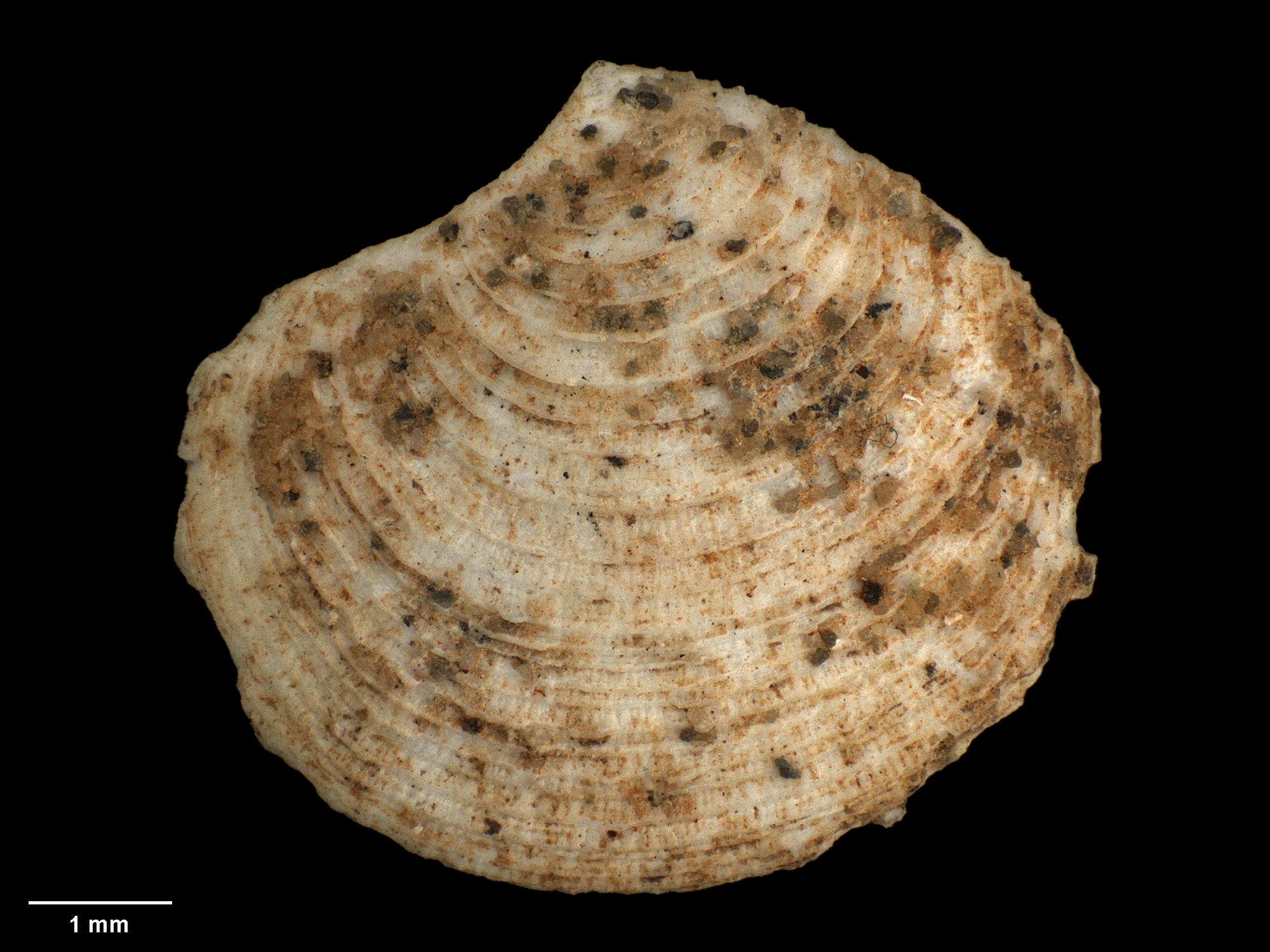
M. staminifera
