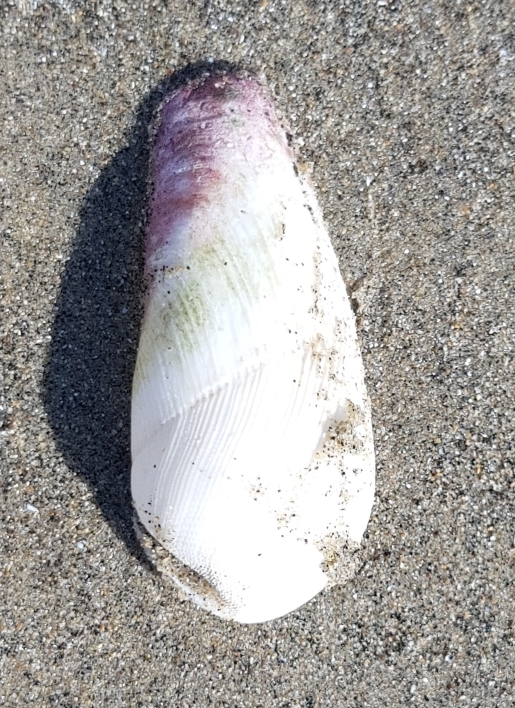
- Pholadidea suteri

Scientific classification
- Kingdom: Animalia
- Phylum: Mollusca
- Class: Bivalvia
- Order: Myida
- Superfamily: Pholadoidea
- Family: Pholadidae
- Genus: Pholadidea; Turton, 1819

Type species
- Pholadidea loscombiana Turton, 1819

Species
- See text.

Synonyms
- Cadmusia Leach in Gray, 1852; Hastasia (misspelling by Olsson 1961); Hatasia Gray, 1851; Pholadidea (Hatasia) Gray, 1851· accepted, alternate representation; Pholadidea (Pholadidea) W. Turton, 1819· accepted, alternate representation; † Pholameria Conrad, 1865; Talonella Gray, 1851

= Pholadidea =

Genus of bivalves

Pholadidea is a taxonomic genus of marine bivalve molluscs in the subfamily Martesiinae of the family Pholadidae (the piddocks). Most members of Pholididea bore into shale, soft rock and coral for shelter, with the exception of Pholididea (Hatasia) wiffenae, which is a wood-borer.

== Description ==
Pholididea is distinguished from the other genera in Martesiinae by having only on umbonal-ventral sulcus, a longitudinally-divided mesoplax, and either no metaplax and hypoplax, or a single plate caused by deposition of calcite in the periostratum.

Pholididea is known from the Eocene to the Holocene, while the subgenus P. (Hatasia) is known only from the Holocene. Species have been reported from the Palaeocene and Late Cretaceous, but these likely belong in other genera.

== Taxonomy ==
The following taxonomic classifications exist in Pholididea:

=== Subgenera ===
- Pholadidea (Pholadidea) Turton, 1819
- Pholadidea (Hatasia) Gray, 1851

=== Species ===
- Pholadidea acherontea Beu & Climo, 1974
- Pholadidea eborensis Cosel & Haga, 2018
- Pholadidea fauroti Jousseaume, 1888
- † Pholadidea finlayi Laws, 1936
- Pholadidea loscombiana Turton, 1819
- Pholadidea melanura G.B. Sowerby I, 1834
- Pholadidea quadra G.B. Sowerby I, 1834
- Pholadidea suteri Lamy, 1926
- Pholadidea tridens Gray, 1843
- Pholadidea tubifera G.B. Sowerby I, 1834
- † Pholadidea wiffenae Crampton, 1990

Synonyms

- Pholadidea acutithyra Tchang, Tsi & Li, 1960 accepted as Penitella acutithyra Tchang, Tsi & Li, 1960
- Pholadidea cheveyi Lamy, 1927 accepted as Aspidopholas ovum W. Wood, 1828
- Pholadidea chishimana Habe, 1955 accepted as Penitella gabbii Tryon, 1863
- Pholadidea dolichothyra Tchang, Tsi & Li, 1960 accepted as Penitella dolichothyra Tchang, Tsi & Li, 1960
- Pholadidea esmeraldensis Olsson, 1961: synonym of Pholadidea tubifera (G. B. Sowerby I, 1834)
- Pholadidea minuscula Dall, 1908 accepted as Martesia fragilis Verrill & Bush, 1898
- Pholadidea sagitta Dall, 1916 accepted as Penitella penita Conrad, 1837
