= Barnea =

Barnea may refer to:

- Kadesh Barnea or Kadesh, a Biblical city
- Barnea, neighborhood in Ashkelon
- Barnea is an olive cultivar in Israel, see List of olive cultivars
- Barnea (bivalve), a genus of bivalves in the family Pholadidae

== People ==
Barnea is a Hebrew surname:

- Nahum Barnea (born 1944), Israeli journalist
- David Barnea (born 1965), Israeli spymaster, chief of Mossad
- Guy Barnea (born 1987), Israeli swimmer
