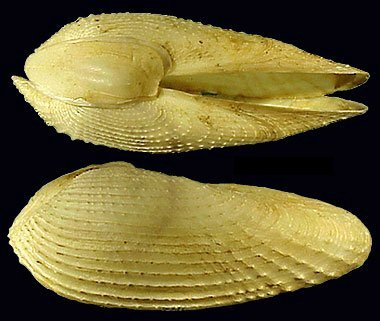
- Two views of a whole shell of Barnea candida

Scientific classification
- Kingdom: Animalia
- Phylum: Mollusca
- Class: Bivalvia
- Order: Myida
- Superfamily: Pholadoidea
- Family: Pholadidae; Lamarck, 1809

Genera
- See text

= Pholadidae =

Pholadidae Temporal range: Jurassic–Recent

Family of bivalves

Pholadidae, known as piddocks or angelwings, are a family of bivalve molluscs similar to a clam.

== Description ==
Piddocks are unique in that each side of their shells is divided into 2 or 3 separate sections. Furthermore, one of the piddock's shells has a set of ridges or "teeth", which they use to grind away at clay or soft rock and create tubular burrows. The shape of these burrows is due to the rotating motion of the piddock as it grinds the rock to make its home. The piddock stays in the burrow it digs for the entirety of its eight-year lifespan, with only its siphon exposed to take in water that it filters for food. When the piddock dies and leaves an empty tubular burrow, other marine life such as sea anemone, crabs and other molluscs may use the burrow.

Some species of Pholadidae may reach up to 18 cm (7″). Their coloration is typically white, though through consumption of red tide algae some may develop a pink coloration.

- The Atlantic mud-piddock, Barnea truncata, often referred to as the fallen angelwing, is classed among the angelwing varieties, growing up to 5.7 cm (2¼″) and is similar to other angelwings but with weaker sculpture. One end is squared off and the other end pointed. Loose accessory plates are located above the hinge on live specimens. It possesses a white exterior and interior. It burrows into mud, clay or softwood. Occasionally it is washed onto sounds and ocean beaches, and has a habitat range from Nova Scotia to Brazil. This fragile shell is rarely dug from mud without breaking. It burrows deeply and has long, united siphons.
- The false angelwing Petricola pholadiformis, is also classed among varieties of angelwing, growing up to 7 cm (2¾″). It has a thin, elongate shell resembling a small angelwing but lacks the rolled-out hinge area. Its beak is at one end of the shell with strong radial ribbing on the beak end. Teeth are located on hinge and a deep pallial sinus and partially united siphons. It has a white exterior and interior. It typically burrows into hard surfaces such as clay or peat in intertidal zones. It is commonly found on sounds and ocean beaches with a range from Canada to Uruguay.
- The common piddock (Pholas dactylus) is known for its bioluminescence and was investigated by Raphaël Dubois in his 1887 discovery of luciferin.

== Genera and selected species ==
- Genus Aspidopholas P. Fischer, 1887
  - Aspidopholas yoshimurai Kuroda & Teramachi, 1930
- Genus Barnea Risso, 1826
  - Barnea candida (Linnaeus, 1758)
  - Barnea davidi (Deshayes, 1874)
  - Barnea fragilis (G. B. Sowerby II, 1849)
  - Barnea manilensis (Philippi, 1847)
  - Barnea parva Pennant, 1777
  - Barnea similis (Gray, 1835)
  - Barnea subtruncata (G. B. Sowerby I, 1834)
  - Barnea truncata (Say, 1822)
- Genus Chaceia Turner, 1855
  - Chaceia ovoidea (Gould, 1851)
- Genus Cyrtopleura Tryon, 1862
  - Cyrtopleura costata (Linnaeus, 1758)
- Genus Diplothyra Tryon, 1862
  - Diplothyra smithii Tryon, 1862
- Genus Jouannetia Desmoulins, 1828
  - Jouannetia quillingi Turner, 1955
- Genus Lignopholas R. D. Turner, 1955
  - Lignopholas rivicola (G. B. Sowerby II, 1849)
- Genus Martesia G. B. Sowerby I, 1824
  - Martesia cuneiformis (Say, 1822)
  - Martesia fragilis A. E. Verrill and Bush, 1890
  - Martesia striata (Linnaeus, 1758)
- Genus Netastoma Carpenter, 1864
  - Netastoma darwinii (Sowerby, 1849)
  - Netastoma japonicum (Yokoyama, 1920)
  - Netastoma rostratum (Valenciennes, 1846)
- Genus Nipponopholas Okamoto & Habe, 1987
  - Nipponopholas satoi Okamoto & Habe, 1987
- Genus Parapholas Conrad, 1848
  - Parapholas californica (Conrad, 1837)
- Genus Penitella Valenciennes, 1846
  - Penitella conradi Valenciennes, 1846
  - Penitella fitchi Turner, 1955
  - Penitella gabbii (Tryon, 1863)
  - Penitella hopkinsi Kennedy and Armentrout, 1989
  - Penitella kamakurensis (Yokoyama, 1922)
  - Penitella penita (Conrad, 1837)
  - Penitella richardsoni Kennedy, 1989
  - Penitella turnerae Evans and Fisher, 1966
- Genus Pholadidea Turton, 1819
  - Pholadidea acherontea Beu and Climo, 1974
  - Pholadidea loscombiana Turton, 1819
  - Pholadidea spathulata (Sowerby, 1850)
  - Pholadidea tridens (Gray, 1843)
- Genus Pholas Linnaeus, 1758
  - Pholas campechiensis Gmelin, 1791
  - Pholas dactylus Linnaeus, 1758 – common piddock
  - Pholas orientalis Gmelin, 1791
- Genus Talona Gray, 1842
  - Talona explanata (Spengler, 1792)
- Genus Zirfaea Gray, 1842
  - Zirfaea crispata (Linnaeus, 1758)
  - Zirfaea pilsbryi Lowe, 1931

== Gallery ==
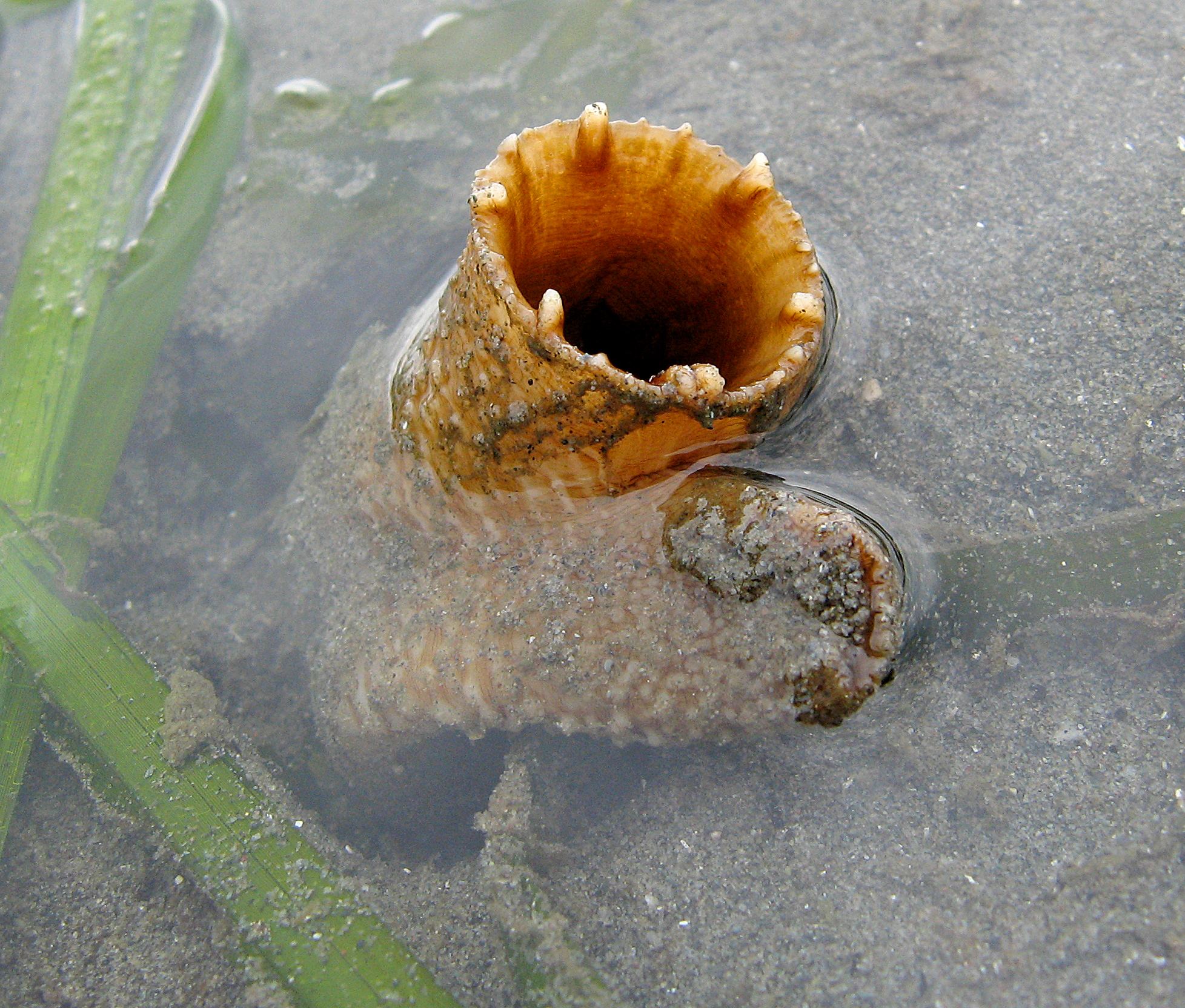
Siphons of the rough piddock, Zirfaea pilsbryi in Puget Sound

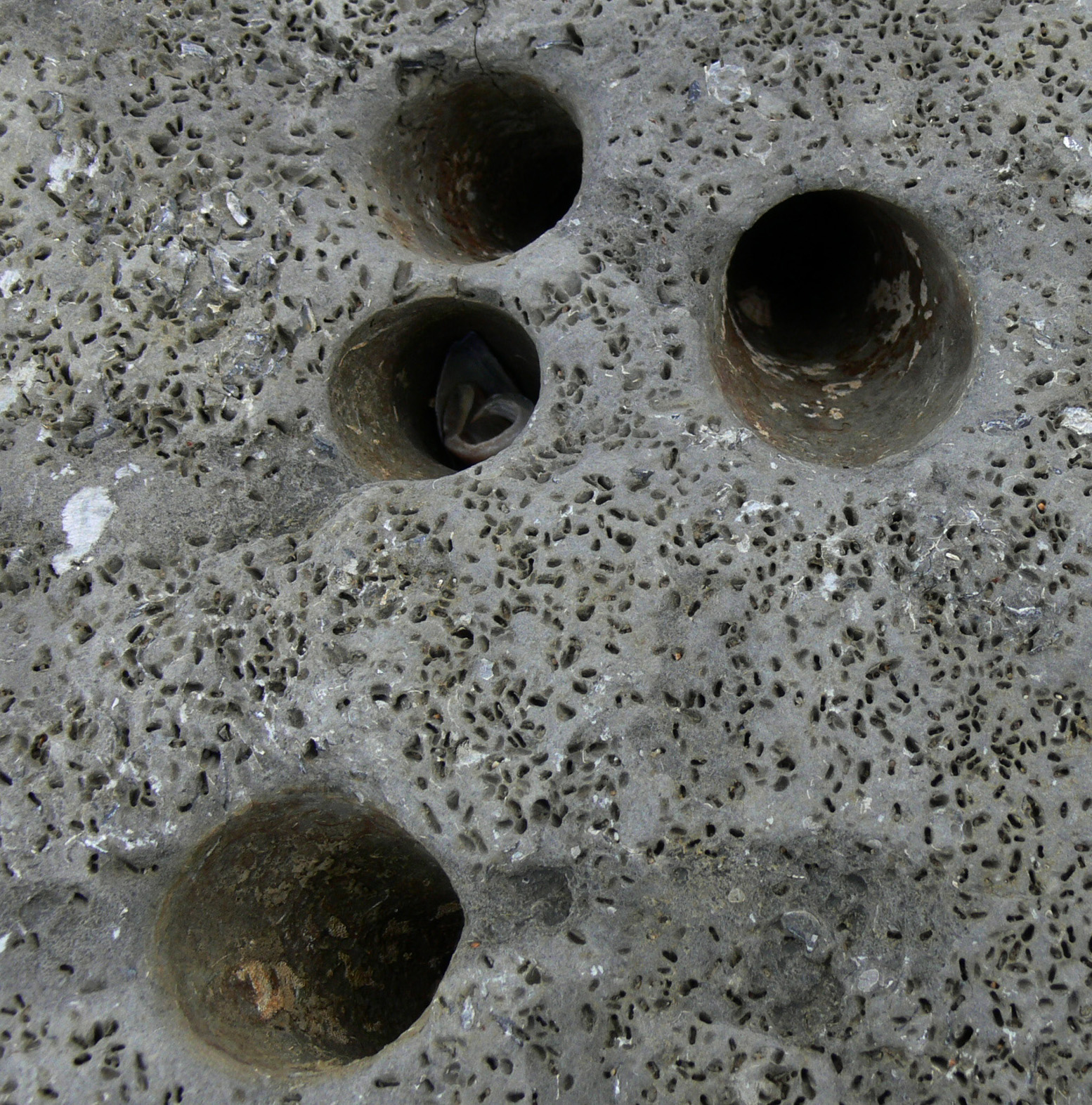
burrows, 2.5 cm (1″) or less, in calcic rock, coast Boulogne - Calais (France)

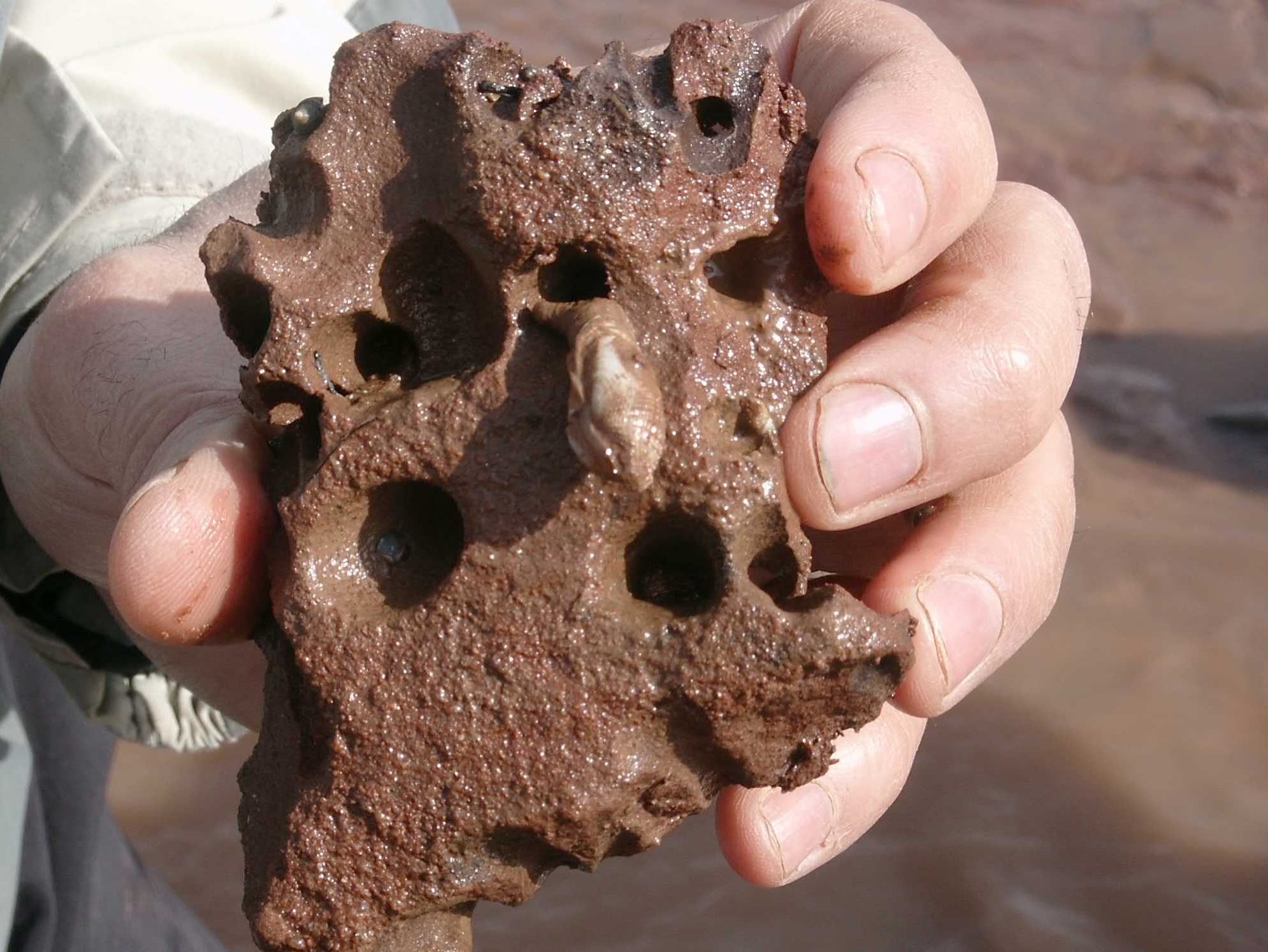
Angelwing and associated burrows

== See also ==
- Pholad borings
