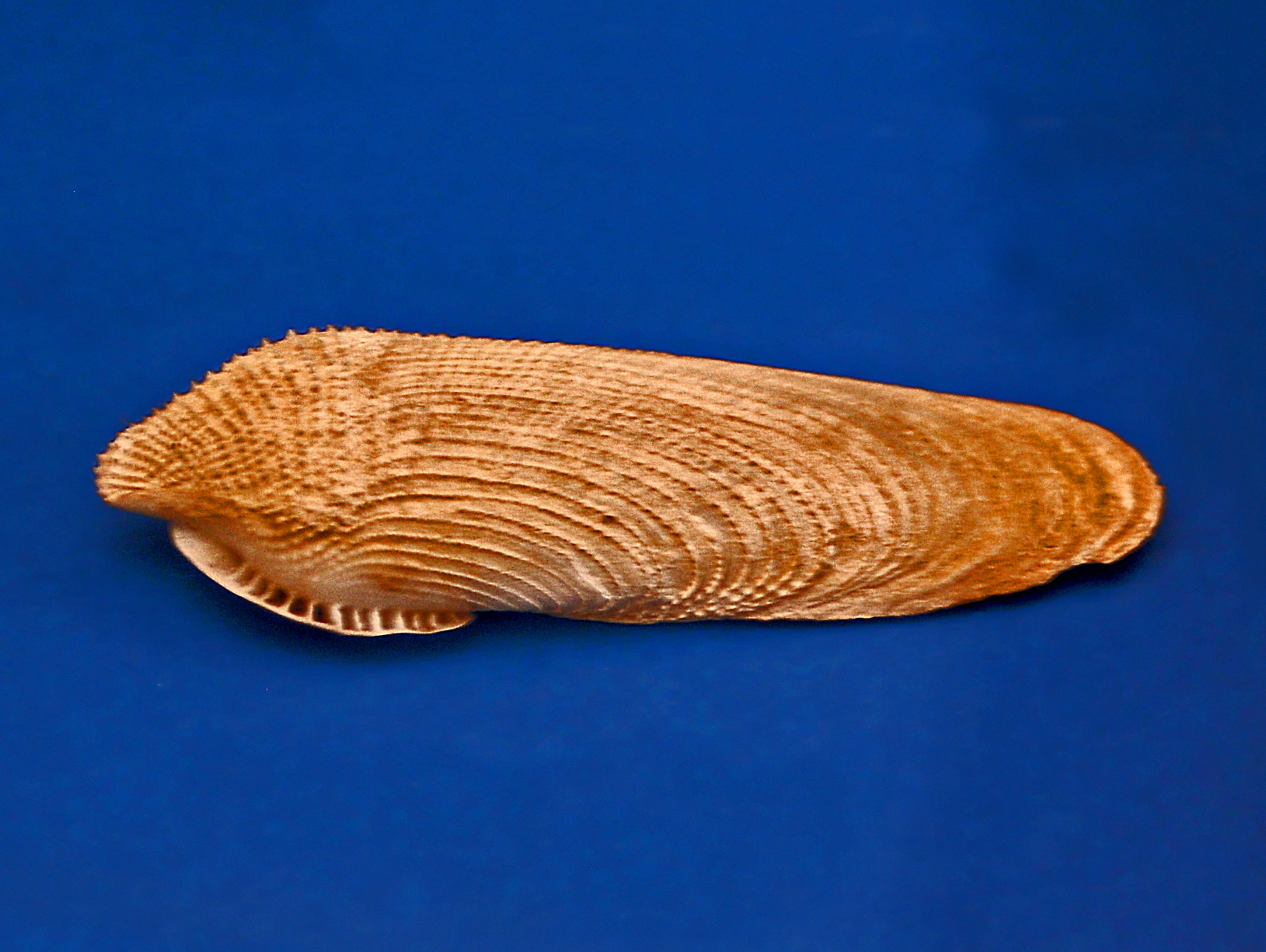
- Shell of Pholas dactylus

Scientific classification
- Domain: Eukaryota
- Kingdom: Animalia
- Phylum: Mollusca
- Class: Bivalvia
- Order: Myida
- Family: Pholadidae
- Genus: Pholas; Linnaeus, 1758

Species
- See text

Synonyms
- Dactylina Gray, 1847; Hypogaea Poli, 1791; Pholas (Monothyra) Tryon, 1862· accepted, alternate representation; Pholas (Pholas) Linnaeus, 1758· accepted, alternate representation; Pholas (Thovana) Gray, 1847· accepted, alternate representation; Pragmopholas P. Fischer, 1887

= Pholas =

Genus of bivalves

Pholas is a taxonomic genus of marine bivalve molluscs in the subfamily Pholadinae of the family Pholadidae.

Like other members of this family, they have an ability to bore through clay, earth, wood and soft rock.

== Subgenera ==
- Pholas (Monothyra) Tryon, 1862
- Pholas (Pholas) Linnaeus, 1758
- Pholas (Thovana) Leach Gray, 1847

== Species ==
- Pholas bissauensis Cosel & Haga, 2018
- Pholas campechiensis Gmelin, 1791
- Pholas chiloensis Molina, 1782
- Pholas dactylus Linnaeus, 1758
- Pholas orientalis Gmelin, 1791

Synonyms

- Pholas silicula Lamarck, 1818: synonym of Barnea candida (Linnaeus, 1758)
