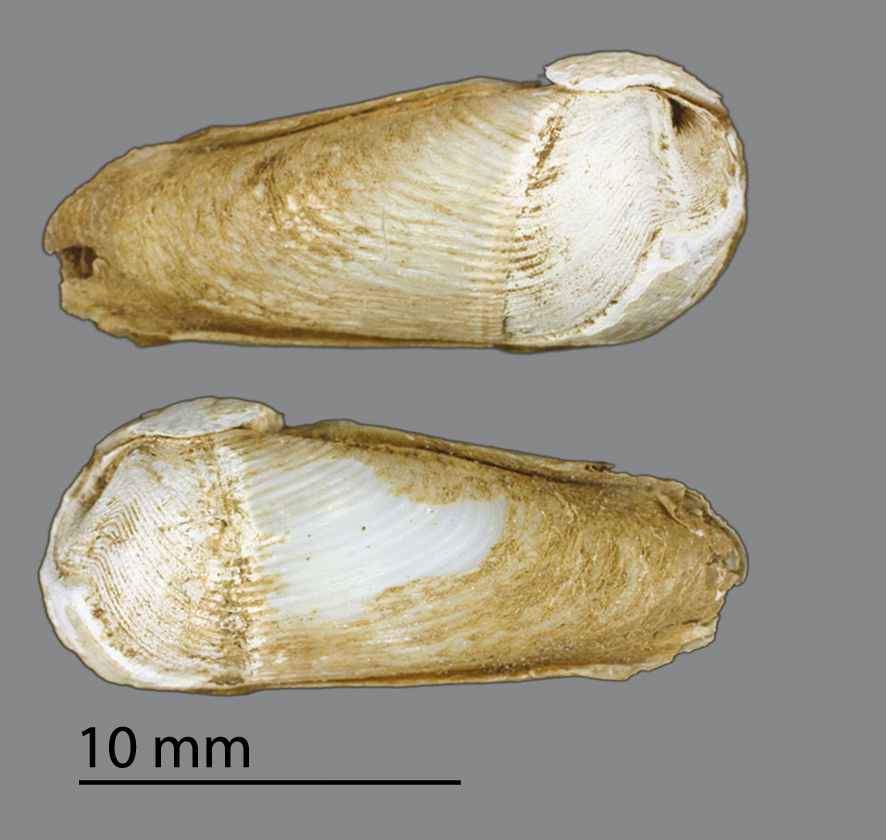

Scientific classification
- Kingdom: Animalia
- Phylum: Mollusca
- Class: Bivalvia
- Order: Myida
- Family: Pholadidae
- Genus: Martesia
- Species: M. striata

Binomial name
- Martesia striata (Linnaeus, 1758)

= Martesia striata =

Species of bivalve

Martesia striata, known as the striate piddock, is a species of bivalve belonging to the family Pholadidae known for boring into wood, including that of boats and dock pilings.

== Description ==
M. striata has a relatively large shell for the genus Martesia, which is colored yellow and white. The shell is wedge-shaped with a rounded posterior and pointed anterior. The posterior end appears wrinkled and has a thin periostracum. The anterior end is made of sigmoid ridges that radiate from the umbo. The shell is about 30 mm long and 14.5 mm high.

== Distribution ==
The species has an almost cosmopolitan distribution, being found from tropical to temperate latitudes but not at the poles.

== Ecology ==
M. striata bores into surfaces to create tunnels to live in. Most often the piddock bores in wood, especially that of boats and dock pilings, but they have also been known to bore into pipes made of acrylonitrile butadiene styrene (ABS). The boring process starts by the piddock first moving to the base of the burrow. Once there, M. striata causes abrasion to the surface by contracting its shell with its abductor muscle. In regions with a monsoon season, the piddock reduces boring activity during this season, as it lines up with their gonad activation. Larval M. striata have a low tolerance for low salinity, causing this pattern.
