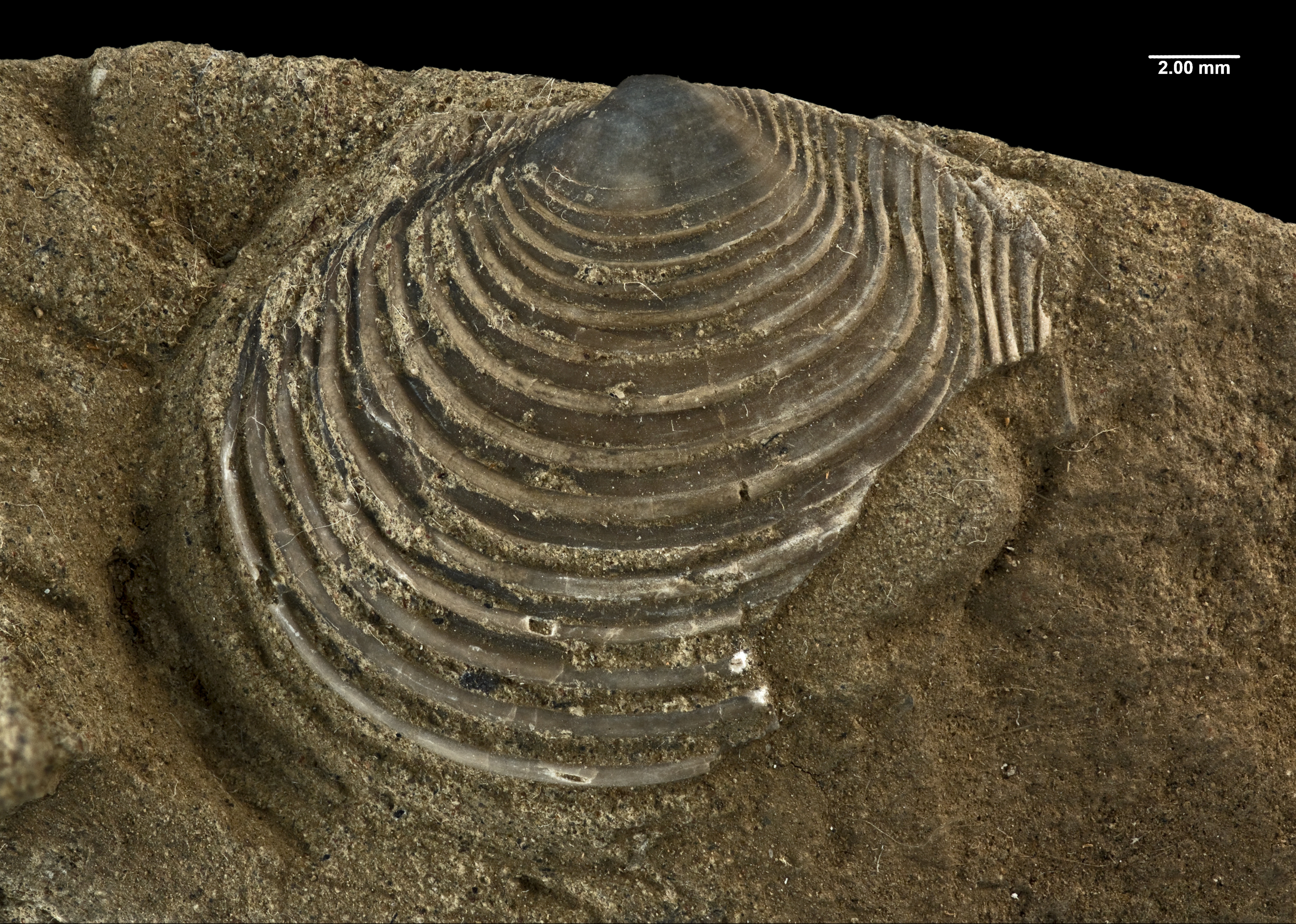
- Holotype from Auckland War Memorial Museum

Scientific classification
- Kingdom: Animalia
- Phylum: Mollusca
- Class: Bivalvia
- Order: Lucinida
- Family: Lucinidae
- Genus: Myrtea
- Species: †M. maoria

Binomial name
- †Myrtea maoria A. W. B. Powell, 1935

= Myrtea maoria =

Myrtea maoria Temporal range: early Miocene

Extinct species of gastropod

Myrtea maoria is an extinct species of bivalve, a marine mollusc, in the family Lucinidae. Fossils of the species date to early Miocene strata of the west coast of the Auckland Region, New Zealand.

== Description ==
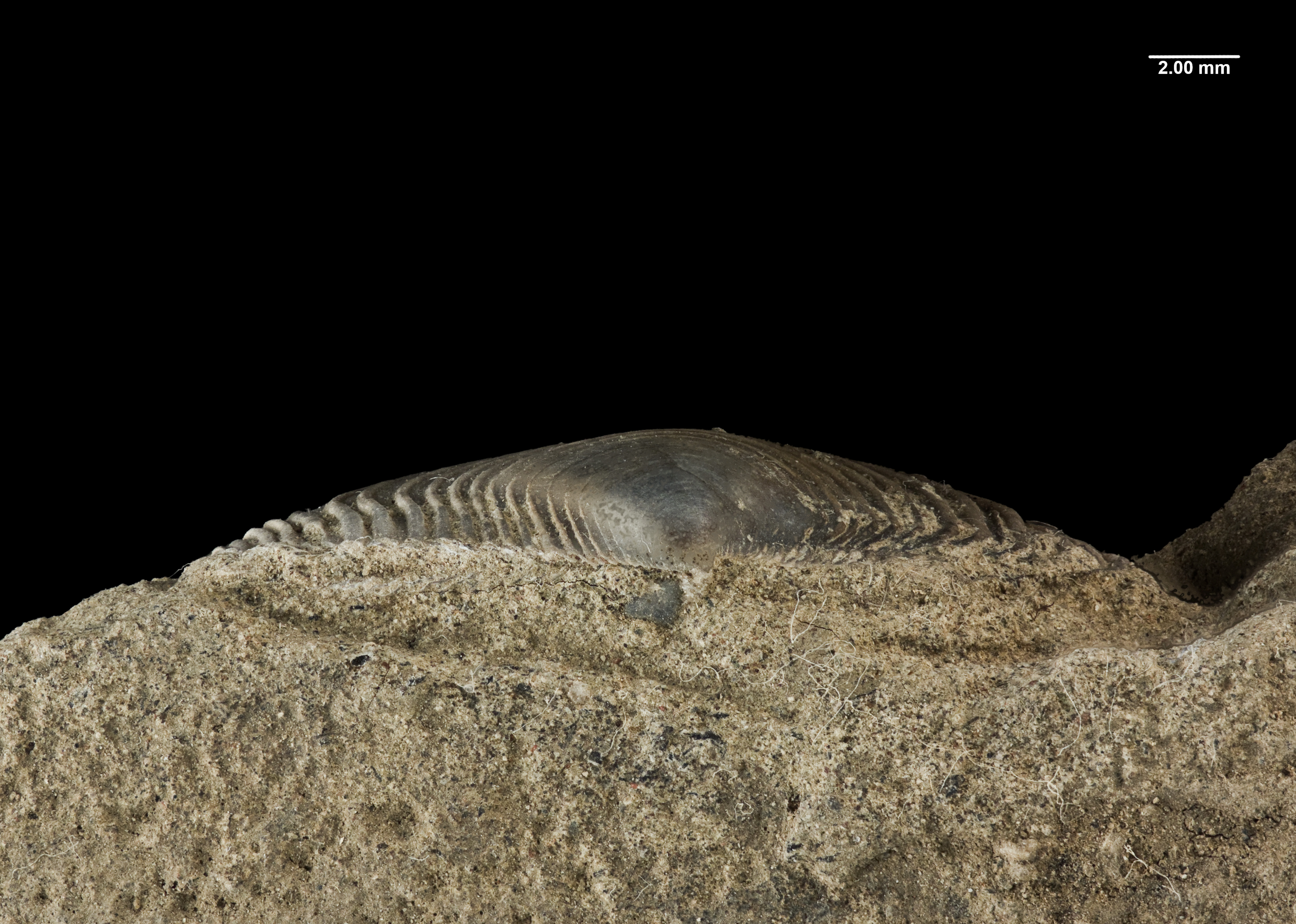
Side view of holotype

In the original description, Powell described the species as follows:

Shell fairly large, oval, almost equilateral, moderately inflated. Beaks low, rather small. Lunule and escutcheon long, narrow, slightly depressed and bordered by a thin ridge which is rendered somewhat serrate by the surmounting and termination of the concentric sculpture. The concentric sculpture is in the form of prominent widely spaced slightly lamellose, rounded upcurved ridges, about four in five millimetres over the lower half of the shell. The interstices are smooth except for occasional faint concentric growth lines, and radial sculpture is entirely absent. Anterior and posterior dorsal areas depressed, causing the traversing concentric ridges to cant a little and to appear slightly flatter and broader as they approach the dorsal edge.

The holotype of the species measures 17 mm (0.67 in) in height and 21 mm (0.83 in) in length. The species can be identified sue to its more oval outline than other members of Pteromyrtea.

== Taxonomy ==
The species was first described by A. W. B. Powell in 1935. The holotype was collected at an unknown date prior to 1935 from between Powell Bay and Bartrum Bay, approximately 2 km (1.2 mi) south of Muriwai, Auckland Region (then more commonly known as Motutara), and is held in the collections of Auckland War Memorial Museum.

== Distribution ==
This extinct marine species occurs in early Miocene strata of the Nihotupu Formation of New Zealand, on the west coast of the Waitākere Ranges of the Auckland Region, New Zealand. The deposits of the Nihotupu Formation in the western Waitākere Ranges where fossils of the species have been found are mid-bathyal 800–2,000 m (2,600–6,600 ft).
