= Oceanida abrejosensis =

- Shell of Oceanida abrejosensis

Scientific classification
- Kingdom: Animalia
- Phylum: Mollusca
- Class: Gastropoda
- Subclass: Caenogastropoda
- Order: Littorinimorpha
- Family: Eulimidae
- Genus: Oceanida
- Species: O. abrejosensis

Binomial name
- Oceanida abrejosensis Bartsch, 1917

Synonyms
- Balcis abreojosensis (Bartsch, 1917) (unaccepted combination); Melanella (Melanella) abreojosensis Bartsch, 1917 superseded combination; Melanella abreojosensis Bartsch, 1917 (unaccepted combination)

Species of gastropod

Oceanida abrejosensis is a species of sea snail, a marine gastropod mollusk in the family Eulimidae.

== Description ==
The type specimen has nine whorls and measures 3.1 mm in length and 1 mm. in diameter.

(Original description) The small shell is acicular, bluish-white, and semitranslucent. The whorls are rather high between the sutures and well rounded, separated by a constricted suture. The surface is marked by extremely fine incremental lines and irregularly spaced varices. The periphery is well rounded, and the base is rather protracted and well rounded.The aperture is moderately large with an acute posterior angle. The outer lip is thick within but thin at the edge. The inner lip is somewhat curved, slightly twisted, and reflected over and appressed to the base. The parietal wall is covered by a moderately thick callus.

== Distribution ==
This species occurs in warm temperate Northeast Pacific. The type was collected at Point Abreojos, Lower California.
