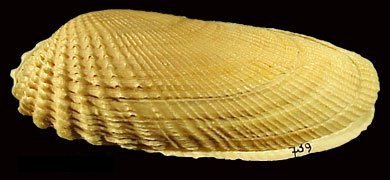
- Paired valves of Petricolaria pholadiformis

Scientific classification
- Kingdom: Animalia
- Phylum: Mollusca
- Class: Bivalvia
- Order: Venerida
- Superfamily: Veneroidea
- Family: Veneridae
- Genus: Petricolaria
- Species: P. pholadiformis

Binomial name
- Petricolaria pholadiformis (Lamarck, 1818)

Synonyms
- Petricola pholadifomis Lamarck, 1818

= False angelwing =

Species of bivalve

Petricolaria pholadiformis, common names false angelwing, or false angel wing (US), and American piddock (UK), is a species of saltwater clam, a marine bivalve mollusk in the family Veneridae, the Venus clams.

== Description ==
Petricolaria pholadiformis closely resembles the angel wing (Cyrtopleura costata), the main distinguishing feature being that it lacks the apophyses, the spoon-shaped wings located near the beak, of the real angel wing. It grows to about 5 centimetres (2.0 in) long and is usually white. The anterior end is extended and has a rounded point while the posterior end is blunt and curved. There are ridges radiating from the beak, which are more pronounced at the posterior end, and fainter growth rings running parallel with the margin.

Right and left valve of the same specimen:

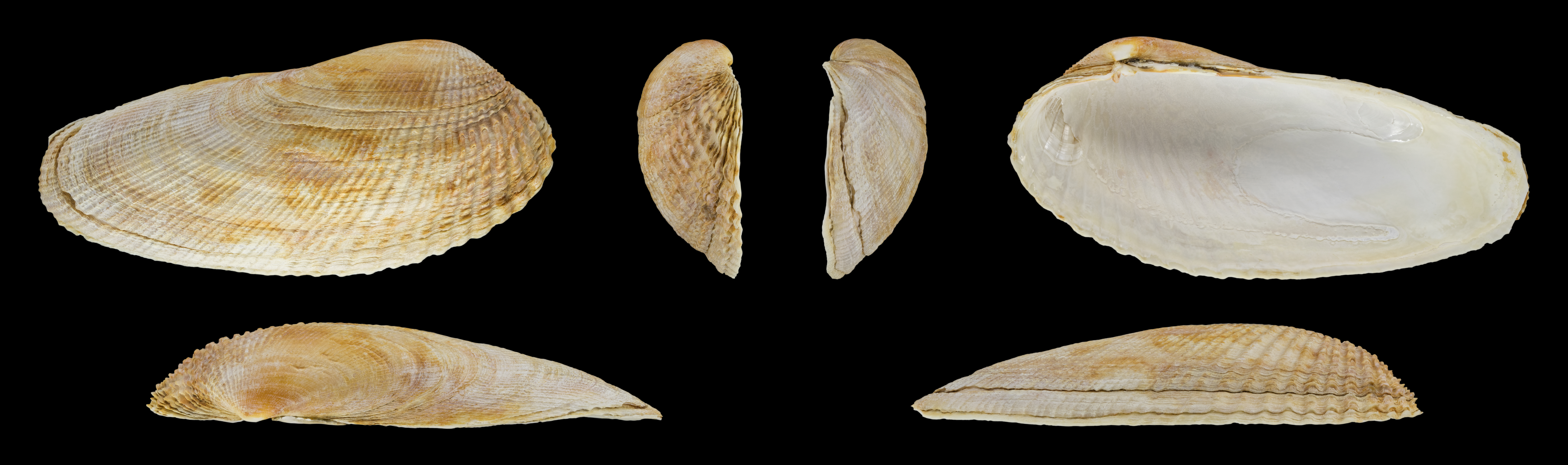
Right valve

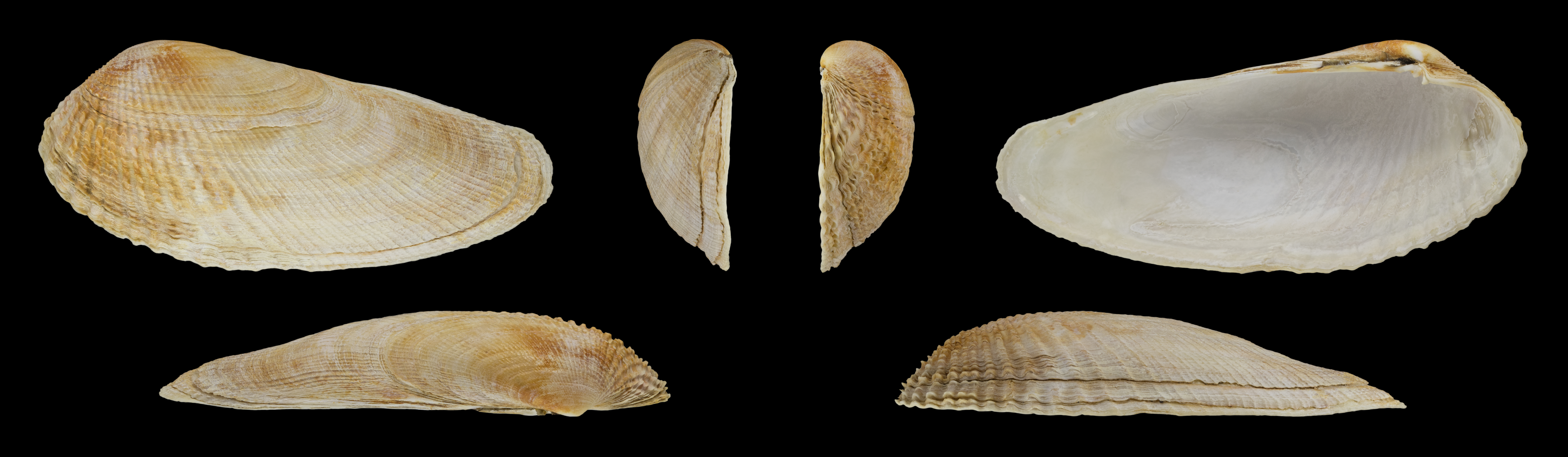
Left valve

== Taxonomy ==
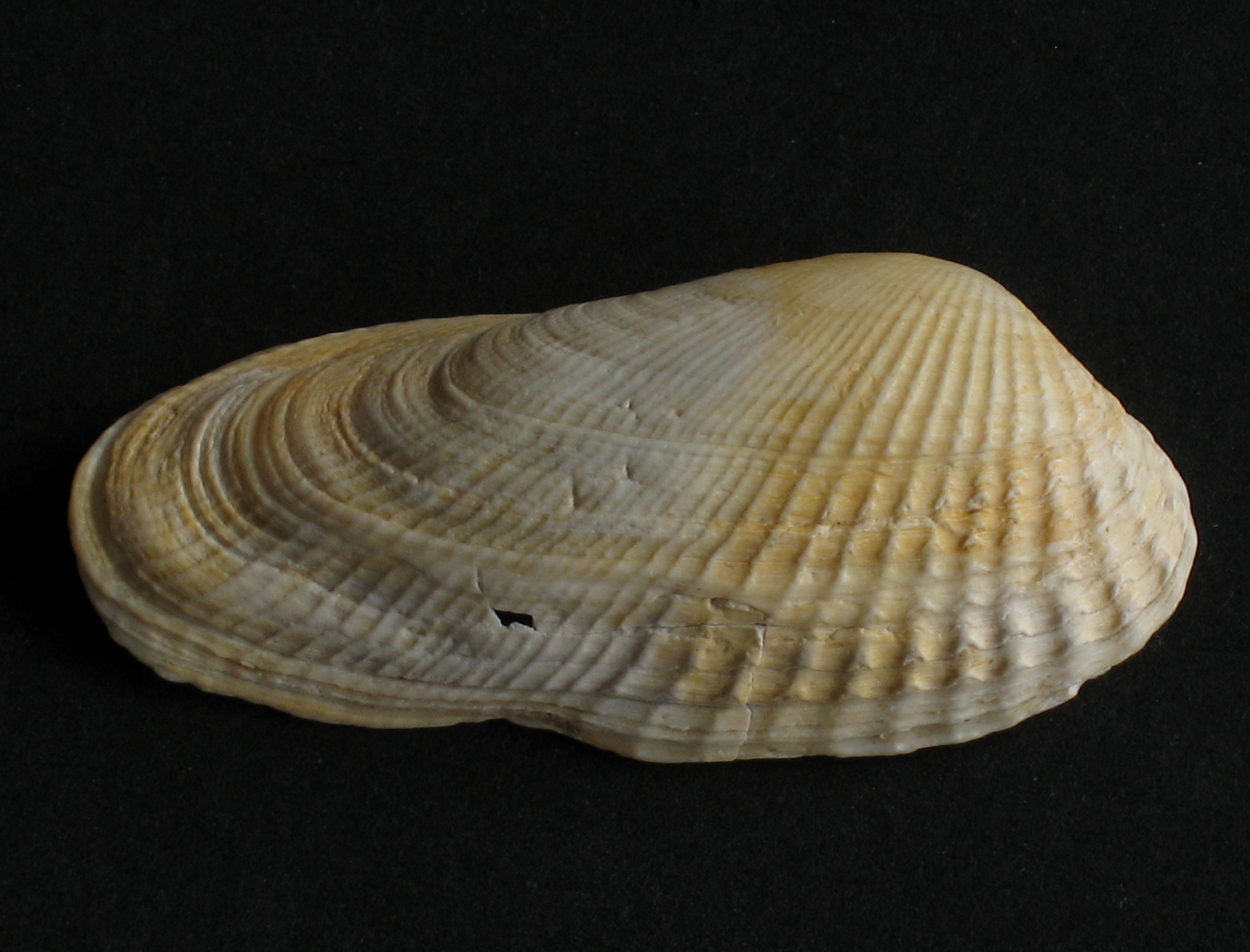
A beachworn right valve of Petricolaria pholadiformis, from Wales

Petricolaria pholadiformis was formerly classified under genus Petricola as Petricola pholadiformis but has since been reclassified under genus Petricolaria.

== Distribution ==
=== Indigenous ===
This species is native to the Eastern Coast of North America including the Gulf of Mexico.

=== Introduced ===
This clam was introduced and has become established in the British Isles and on the West Coast of North America. It has been present in the coastal waters of the Netherlands since 1905 at the latest.
