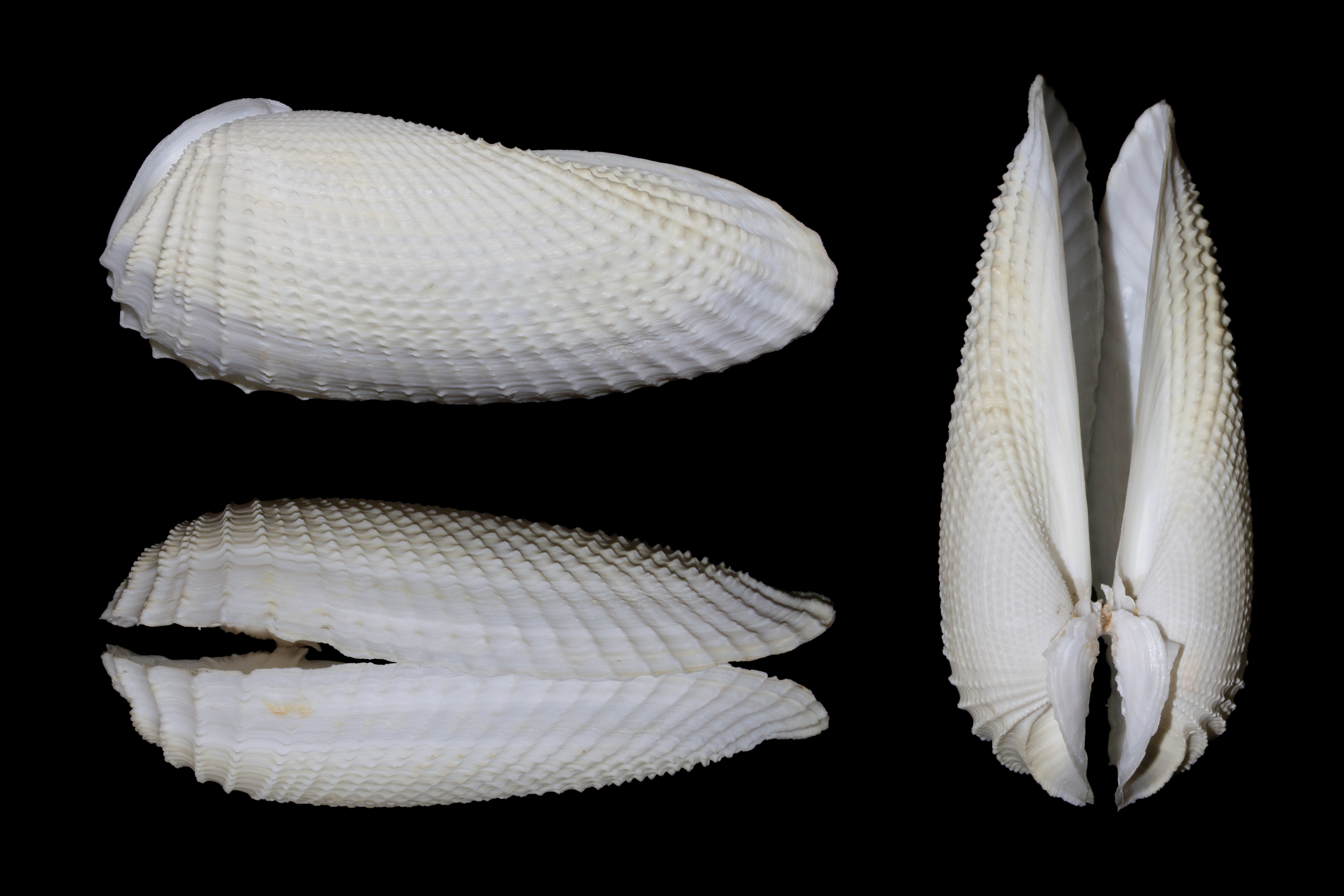
- Cyrtopleura costata. Found in mud, about 50 cm deep. Fort Myers, Florida, USA. Length 13 cm.

Scientific classification
- Kingdom: Animalia
- Phylum: Mollusca
- Class: Bivalvia
- Order: Myida
- Family: Pholadidae
- Genus: Cyrtopleura; Tryon, 1862

= Cyrtopleura =

Genus of bivalves

Cyrtopleura is a genus of bivalves belonging to the family Pholadidae.

The species of this genus are found in Europe and America.

Species:

- Cyrtopleura costata (Linnaeus, 1758)
- Cyrtopleura crucigera (Sowerby I, 1834)
- Cyrtopleura lanceolata (d'Orbigny, 1841)
