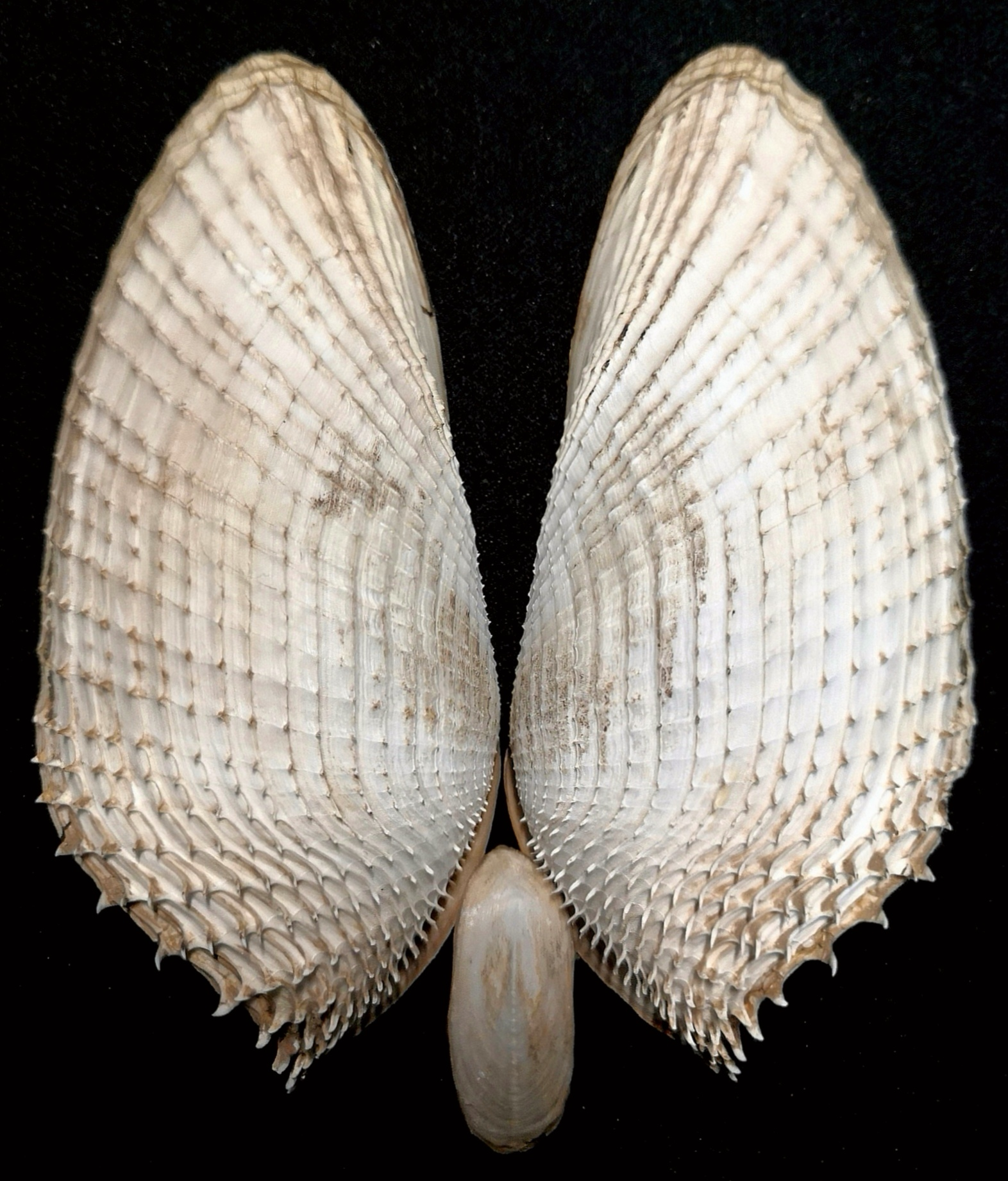
- Shell of B. davidi

Scientific classification
- Kingdom: Animalia
- Phylum: Mollusca
- Class: Bivalvia
- Order: Myida
- Superfamily: Pholadoidea
- Family: Pholadidae
- Genus: Barnea
- Species: B. davidi

Binomial name
- Barnea davidi (Deshayes, 1874)

Synonyms
- Pholas davidi Deshayes, 1874

= Barnea davidi =

Species of marine bivalve

Barnea davidi is a species of marine bivalve mollusc in the family Pholadidae.

== Distribution ==
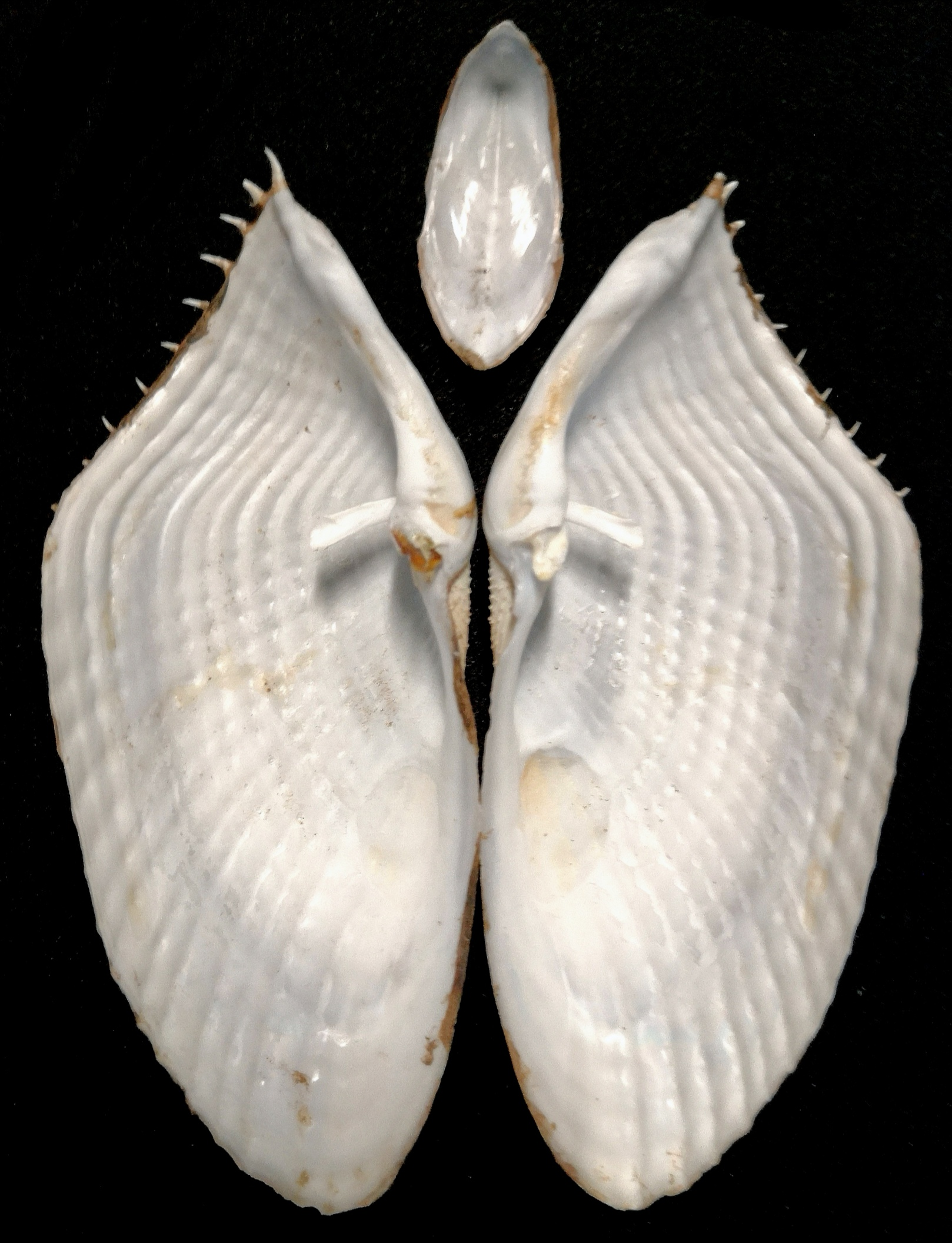
Shell of B. davidi (ventral view), found on estuarine mudflat in Qingdao, China.

B. davidi is found in the Northwest Pacific, along the shorelines of China (Bohai Sea, Yellow Sea and Zhejiang), Korea and Taiwan. It lives in mud burrows, from the intertidal zone to the shallow seabed.
