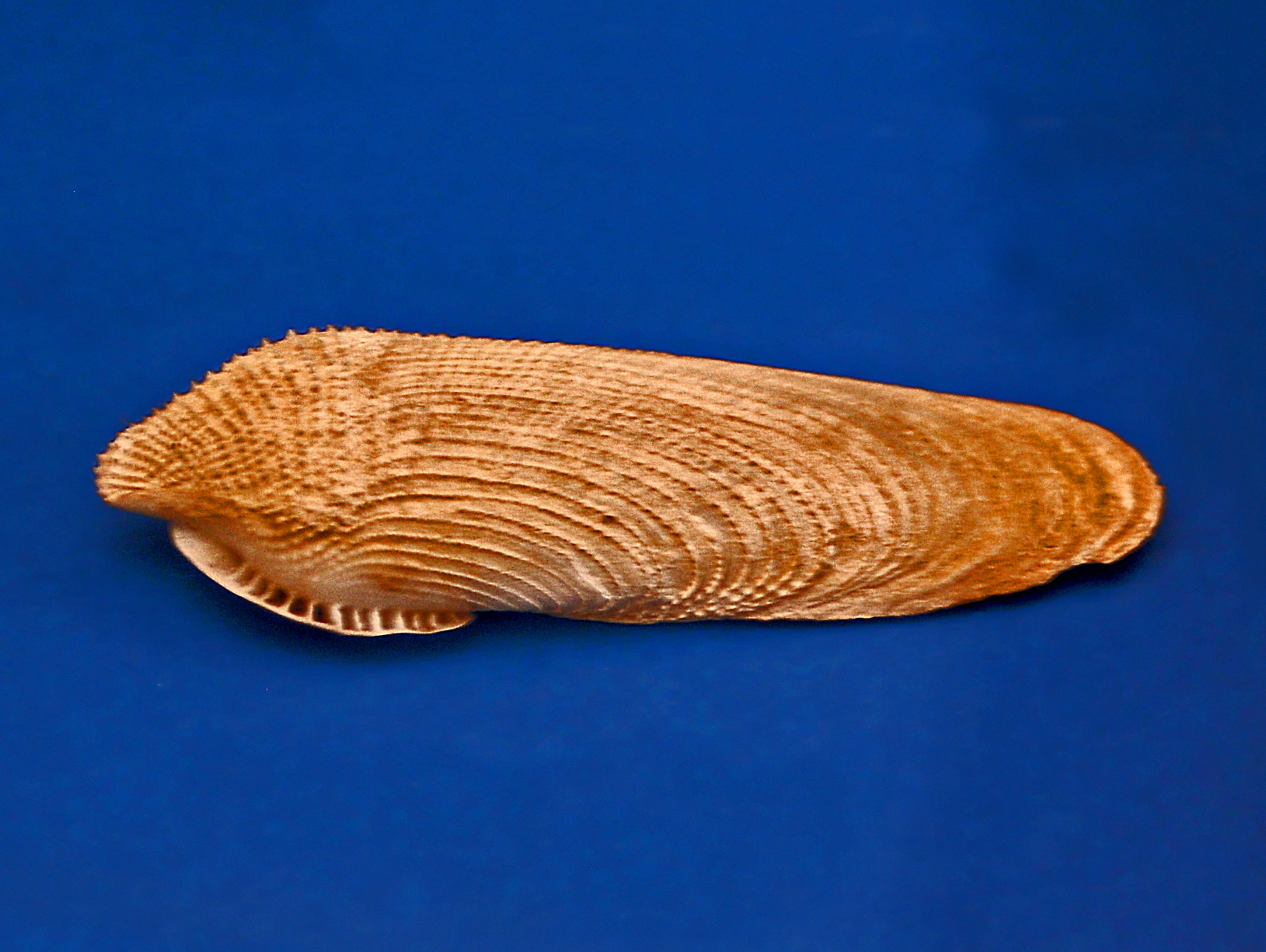
- Shell of Pholas dactylus from Sicily on display at the Museo Civico di Storia Naturale di Milano

Scientific classification
- Kingdom: Animalia
- Phylum: Mollusca
- Class: Bivalvia
- Order: Myida
- Family: Pholadidae
- Genus: Pholas
- Species: P. dactylus

Binomial name
- Pholas dactylus Linnaeus, 1758

Synonyms
- Pholas callosa Cuvier, 1817; Pholas callosa Lamarck, 1818; Pholas dactylina Locard, 1886; Pholas dactylus var. decurtata Jeffreys, 1865; Pholas dactylus var. gracilis Jeffreys, 1865; Pholas edwardsi Monterosato, 1878; Pholas hians Lightfoot, 1786; Pholas jordani van Hoepen, 1941; Pholas marmoratus Perry, 1811; Pholas muricatus da Costa, 1778; Pholas mytiloides Bory de Saint-Vincent, 1827; Zirphaea julan H. Adams & A. Adams, 1856

= Pholas dactylus =

Species of bivalve mollusc

Pholas dactylus, or common piddock, is a bioluminescent clam-like species of marine mollusc in the family Pholadidae.

== Description ==
The piddock bores into the substrate for shelter, and lives in a tubular burrow formed by grinding the material away with hard parts of the shell by rotating on the longitudinal axis. It has been known to bore into the hard metamorphic rock gneiss, though it more often lives in softer rock. It is a filter feeder, using its siphons to reach the water outside the burrow. It was once a highly esteemed food in Europe.

It is sensitive to light, retracting into its shell when exposed to it. The distribution ranges from coasts of the North Atlantic and the Mediterranean Sea.

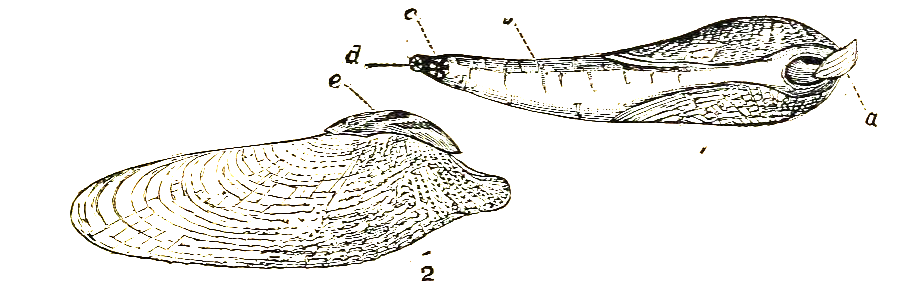
Pholas dactylus: 1. Animal in the shell a) foot b) siphons c) inhalant orifice d) exhalant orifice. 2. shell e) accessory valves or plates

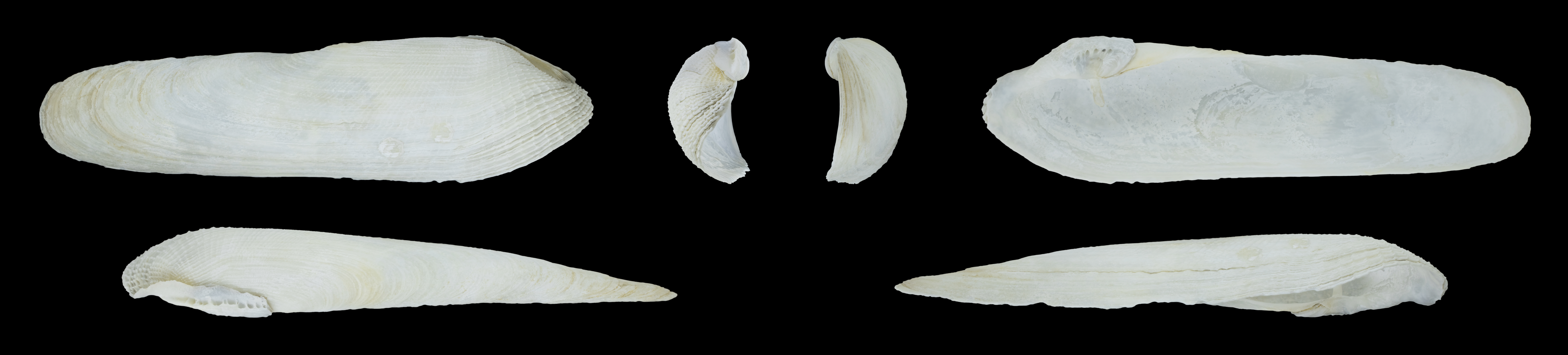
Right valve

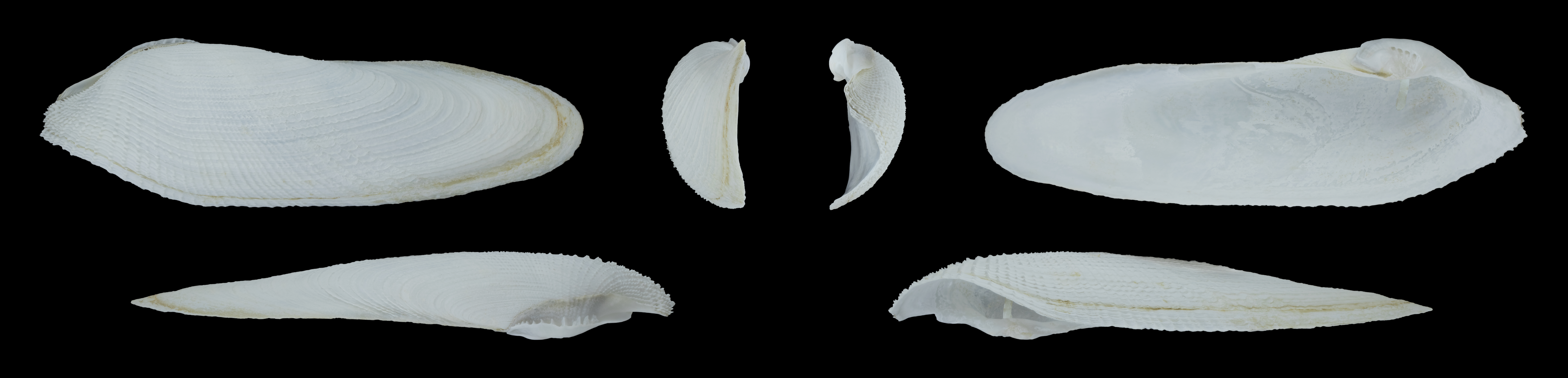
Left valve

== Ancient history ==
Pliny spoke of luminescence in the mouths of people who ate Pholas, the rock-boring shell-fish, and of such importance is this phenomenon that it is even said to have gained the first king of Scotland his throne. Hippolytus of Rome tells us that it was a common pagan trick to use the luminescent property of this clam to create the illusion of burning, "And they accomplish the burning of a house, by daubing it over with the juice of a certain fish called dactylus." In Bernard Cornwell’s ‘Excalibur’ Merlin daubs a girl in the juices from ‘Piddocks’ (a local British name) to give the impression of pagan divinity in a young girl.
