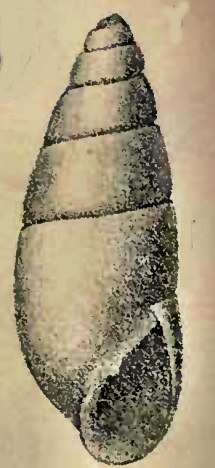
- Drawing of a shell of Doliella nitens

Scientific classification
- Kingdom: Animalia
- Phylum: Mollusca
- Class: Gastropoda
- Subcohort: Panpulmonata
- Superfamily: Pyramidelloidea
- Family: Pyramidellidae
- Genus: Doliella

Type species
- Odostomia nitens Jeffreys, 1870

Synonyms
- Odostomia (Doliella) Monterosato, 1880

= Doliella =

Genus of sea snails

Doliella is a genus of sea snails, marine gastropod mollusks in the family Pyramidellidae, the pyrams and their allies.

== Species ==
Species within the genus Doliella include:

- Doliella nitens (Jeffreys, 1870)
