= Pholas campechiensis =

Scientific classification
- Domain: Eukaryota
- Kingdom: Animalia
- Phylum: Mollusca
- Class: Bivalvia
- Order: Myida
- Family: Pholadidae
- Genus: Pholas
- Species: P. campechiensis

Binomial name
- Pholas campechiensis Gmelin, 1791

Species of bivalve

Pholas campechiensis is a species of bivalve belonging to the family Pholadidae.

The species is found in the Americas and West Africa.
