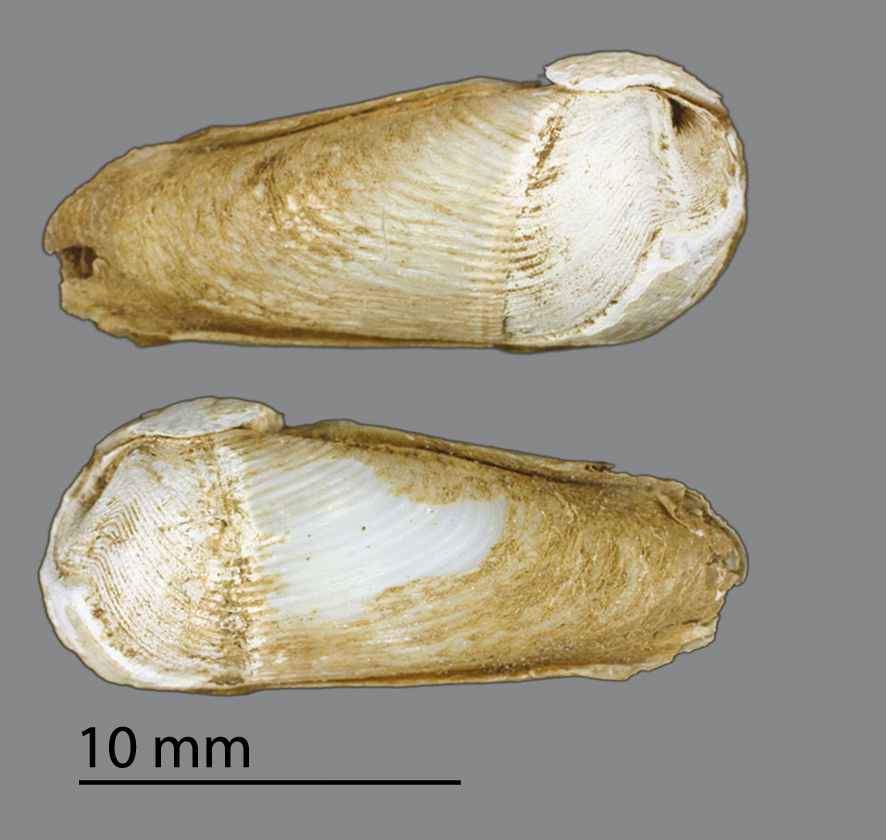
- Martesia striata

Scientific classification
- Kingdom: Animalia
- Phylum: Mollusca
- Class: Bivalvia
- Order: Myida
- Family: Pholadidae
- Genus: Martesia; Sowerby I, 1824

= Martesia (bivalve) =

Genus of bivalves

Martesia is a genus of bivalves belonging to the family Pholadidae.

The genus has cosmopolitan distribution.

Species:

- Martesia clausa Gabb, 1864
- Martesia cuneiformis (Say, 1822)
- Martesia cylindrica Riedel, 1933
- Martesia fragilis Verrill & Bush, 1898
- Martesia mcevoyi McLearn, 1929
- Martesia meganosensis Clark & Woodford, 1927
- Martesia multistriata (G.B.Sowerby II, 1849)
- Martesia nairi R.D.Turner & Santhakumaran, 1989
- Martesia oligocenica Maury, 1912
- Martesia procurva Wade, 1926
- Martesia pygmaea Tchang, Tsi & Li, 1960
- Martesia sanctidominici Maury, 1917
- Martesia sanctipauli Maury, 1917
- Martesia striata Linnaeus, 1758
- Martesia tolkieni Kennedy, 1974
- Martesia truncata Wade, 1926
