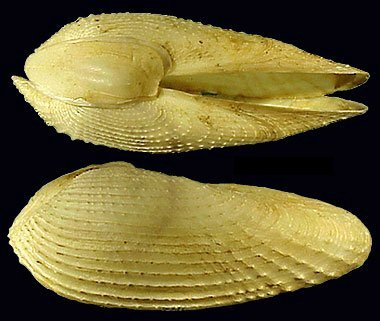

Scientific classification
- Kingdom: Animalia
- Phylum: Mollusca
- Class: Bivalvia
- Order: Myida
- Superfamily: Pholadoidea
- Family: Pholadidae
- Genus: Barnea
- Species: B. candida

Binomial name
- Barnea candida (Linnaeus, 1758)

Synonyms
- Barnea spinosa Risso, 1826; Pholas candidus Linnaeus, 1758; Pholas candidus cylindracea J. T. Marshall, 1914; Pholas candidus var. subovata Jeffreys, 1865; Pholas costulata Goodall, 1890; † Pholas cylindricus J. Sowerby, 1818; Pholas papyraceus Spengler, 1792; Pholas silicula Lamarck, 1818

= Barnea candida =

Barnea candida Temporal range: Holocene to Present

Species of bivalve

Barnea candida is a marine bivalve mollusc in the family Pholadidae.

== Description ==
The size of B. candida ranges up to 50 mm in length and up to 20mm in width. THe color is either chalk-white, yellow-white or grey. Fossils of B. candida are common in the North Sea region in deposits from the Holocene, the Eemian Stage and late Middle Pleistocene.

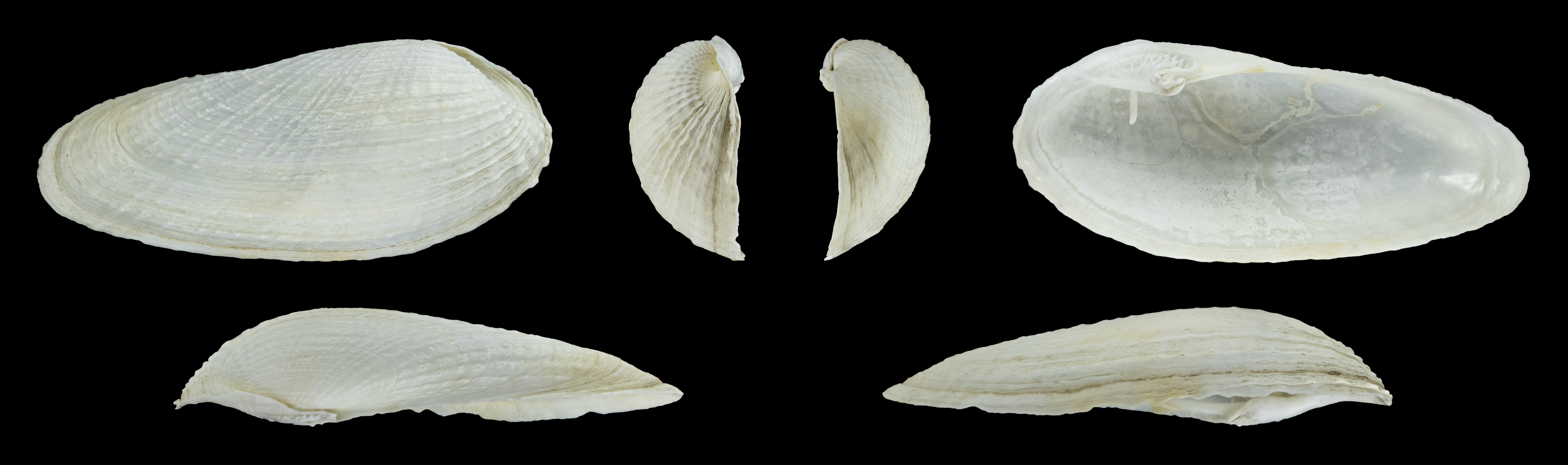
Right valve

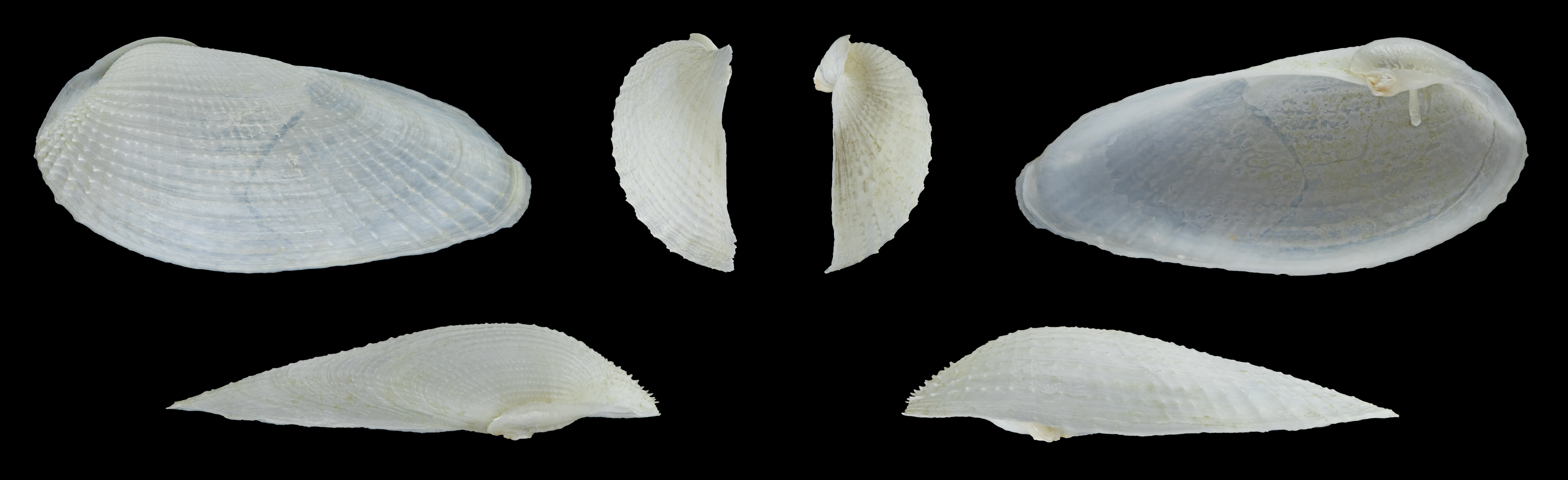
Left valve
