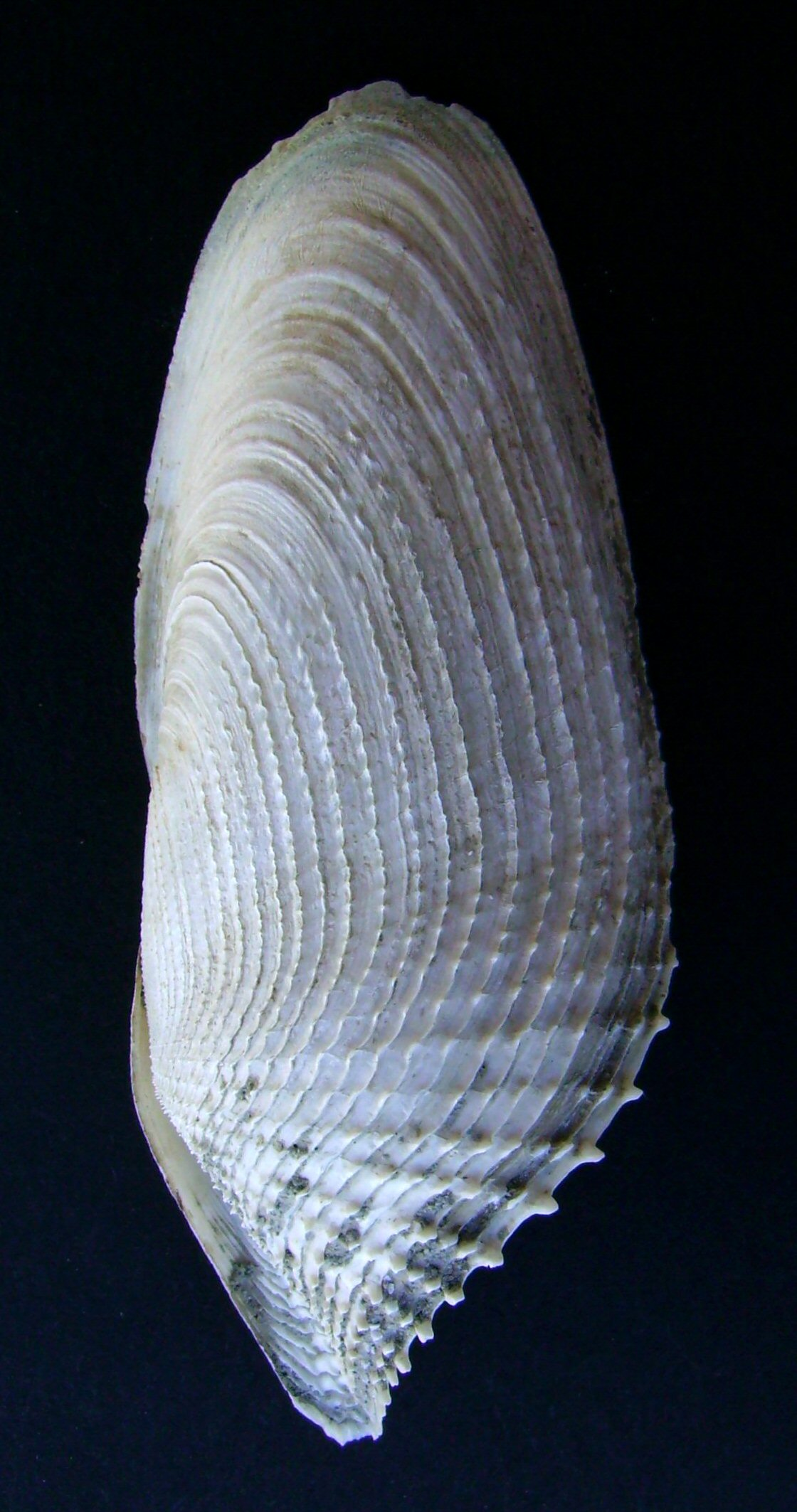

Scientific classification
- Kingdom: Animalia
- Phylum: Mollusca
- Class: Bivalvia
- Order: Myida
- Superfamily: Pholadoidea
- Family: Pholadidae
- Genus: Barnea
- Species: B. similis

Binomial name
- Barnea similis (Gray, 1835)

= Barnea similis =

Species of bivalve

Barnea similis, a rock borer or piddock, is a marine bivalve mollusc in the family Pholadidae.

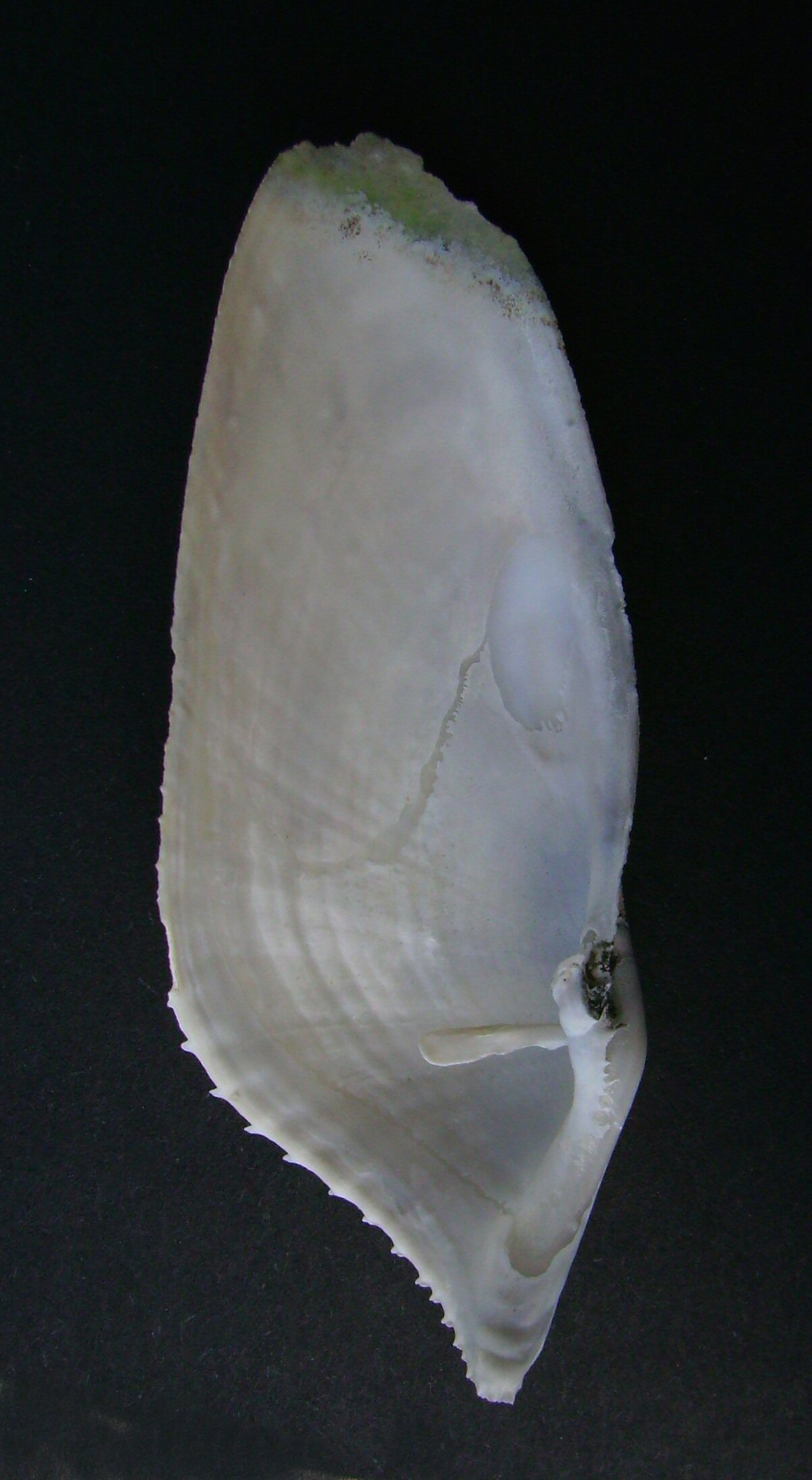
Barnea similis inside view, showing a shelly projection near the hinge
