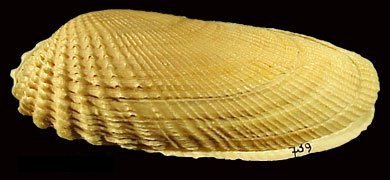
- A shell of Petricolaria pholadiformis

Scientific classification
- Kingdom: Animalia
- Phylum: Mollusca
- Class: Bivalvia
- Order: Venerida
- Superfamily: Veneroidea
- Family: Veneridae
- Genus: Petricolaria; Stoliczka, 1870

Species
- See text.

= Petricolaria =

Genus of bivalves

Petricolaria is a genus of saltwater clams, marine bivalve mollusks in the family Veneridae, the Venus clams.

== Species ==
Species within the genus Petricolaria include:

- Petricolaria cognata (C. B. Adams, 1852)
- Petricolaria cultellus (Deshayes, 1853)
- Petricolaria donnae (Petuch, 1998)
- Petricolaria gracilis (Deshayes, 1853)
- Petricolaria pholadiformis (Lamarck), 1818 – false angelwing
- Petricolaria serrata (Deshayes, 1853)
