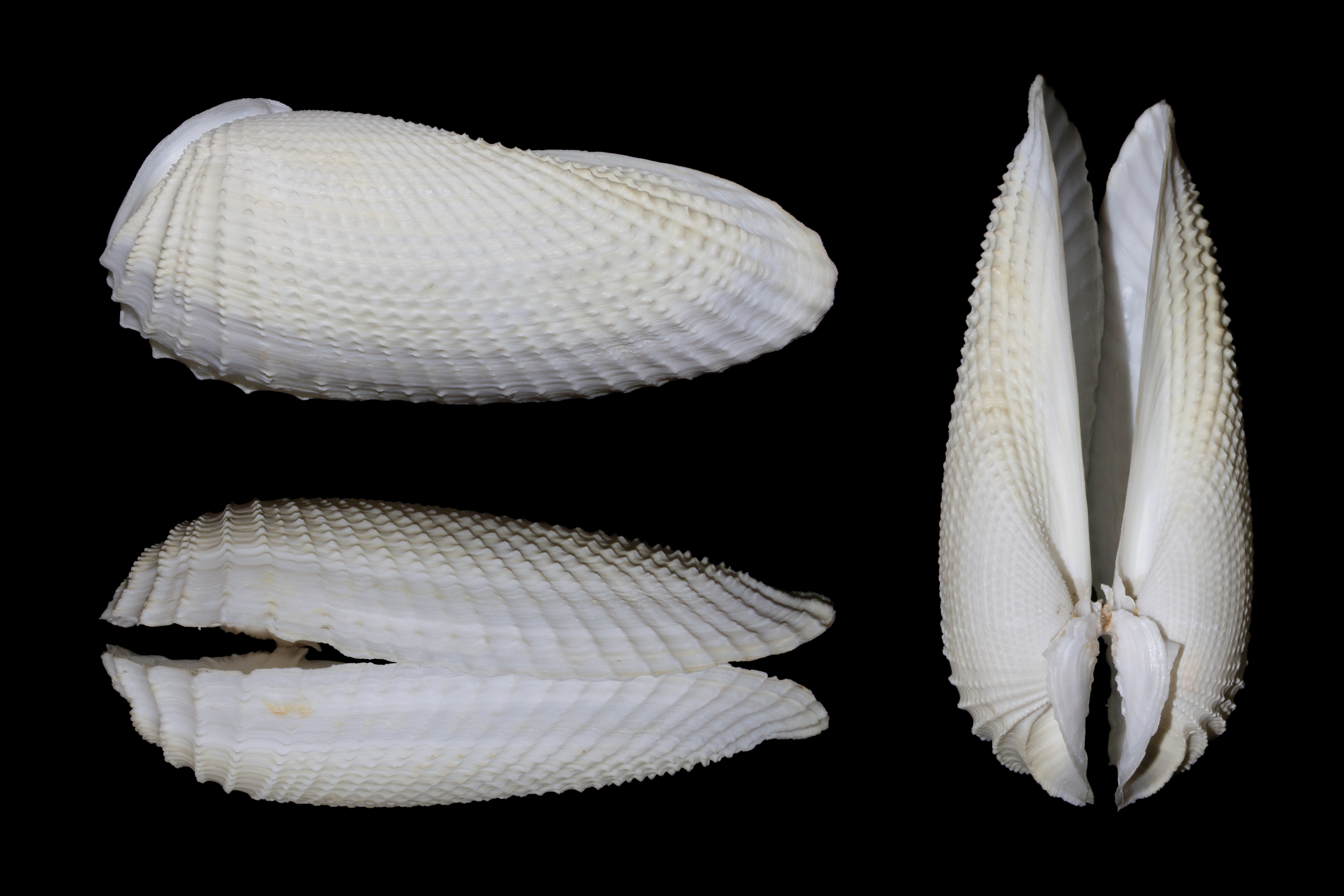
- Cyrtopleura costata

Scientific classification
- Kingdom: Animalia
- Phylum: Mollusca
- Class: Bivalvia
- Order: Myida
- Superfamily: Pholadoidea
- Family: Pholadidae
- Genus: Cyrtopleura
- Species: C. costata

Binomial name
- Cyrtopleura costata Linnaeus, 1758

Synonyms
- Capulus shreevei Conrad, 1869; Leuconyx tayleriana H. Adams & A. Adams, 1863; Pholas costata Linnaeus, 1758

= Cyrtopleura costata =

Species of bivalve

Cyrtopleura costata, or the angel wing clam, is a bivalve mollusc in the family Pholadidae. It is found in shallow parts of the northwest Atlantic Ocean and also in the North Sea coast of Scotland and the western coast of the Adriatic Sea in a remote area in the Marche region in central Italy. It lives on the seabed, where it digs its burrows through soft sand and mud using a very slow, revolving movement. These burrows can take years to form, and can reach a maximum depth of 8ft, but always below 3 feet (0.91 m) at the lowest tide.

== Description ==
Cyrtopleura costata has a pair of brittle, asymmetric white valves and can grow to about 7 inches (180 mm) in length. The anterior end is elongated and has a rounded point which is used for digging through the substrate. The posterior end is truncated and rounded and near the beak has an apophysis, a wing-like flange, which helps provide an attachment for the foot muscles. On the anterior side of the beak, the margin is smooth and bent slightly upwards. The whole valve has finely sculptured radial ribs which intercept with a series of concentric growth rings parallel with the margin. In the living animal, the valves are covered by the periostracum, a thin grey protective layer of protein which is part of the shell. This layer has usually been stripped away by sand and surf by the time that the empty shells are washed up on the beach, and the valves are usually found singly, because the muscles that hold them together are weak. Internally, the live mollusc has a powerful muscular foot and a pair of long, fused siphons. These siphons are unable to retract back into the shell and as a result, the two valves permanently gape apart.

== Distribution ==
Cyrtopleura costata is found in shallow seas in the north east Atlantic Ocean between Cape Cod and the Gulf of Mexico. It is also found in the West Indies, Central America and as far south as Brazil. It is most common in the intertidal zone and just below low water mark.

== Biology ==
Cyrtopleura costata lives beneath the surface of the sea bed. It is able to bore through sand, mud, wood, clay and even soft rock using a twisting motion of its pointed anterior end, assisted by jets of water ejected from the mantle cavity. It is a filter feeder. Its siphons extend to the surface of the substrate and water is drawn in through one and expelled through the other with microalgae and zooplankton being filtered out as the water passes through the gills. Respiration takes place at the same time. Cilia then draw the food particles up to the mouth.

Spawning usually takes place in summer. Gametes are passed out of the exhalent siphon and fertilisation takes place externally. After hatching, eggs develop into veliger larvae which are planktonic. After 16 to 21 days, these undergo metamorphosis into a pediveliger stage and settle out onto a soft substrate such as sand. There they become juveniles and start burrowing.

== Uses ==
Cyrtopleura costata is used as food in Cuba and Puerto Rico. It is a fast-growing species, and it has been investigated for possible use in commercial aquaculture. Under optimal conditions, it was found that the larvae were ready to undergo metamorphosis after 12 days, and settlement could be triggered by use of a dilute solution of epinephrine. The clams could reach a marketable size of 6 centimetres (2.4 in) within 6 months.
