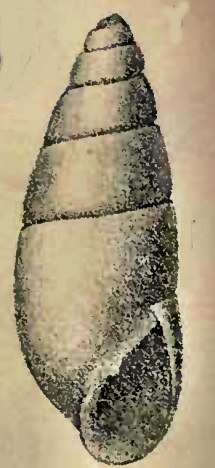
- Drawing of a shell of Doliella nitens

Scientific classification
- Kingdom: Animalia
- Phylum: Mollusca
- Class: Gastropoda
- Family: Pyramidellidae
- Genus: Doliella
- Species: D. nitens

Binomial name
- Doliella nitens (Jeffreys, 1870)

Synonyms
- Odostomia myosotis Nordsieck, 1972 (dubious synonym); Odostomia nitens Jeffreys, 1870

= Doliella nitens =

Species of gastropod

Doliella nitens is a species of sea snail, a marine gastropod mollusk in the family Pyramidellidae, the pyrams and their allies.

== Description ==
The length of the shell varies between 2 mm and 2.9 mm. The white shell is thin, semitransparent, very glossy and shows microscopic growth lines. There are three whorls besides the protoconch. The suture is very narrow, slightly excavated and margined by the overlapping of the whorls. The umbilicus is lacking. The columellar tooth is represented by a broad, but not conspicuous, fold.

== Distribution ==
This marine species occurs in the following locations:

- Atlantic Europe
- Portuguese Exclusive Economic Zone
- Spanish Exclusive Economic Zone
- United Kingdom Exclusive Economic Zone
- Azores Exclusive Economic Zone
- Canary Islands
- Cape Verdes
- European waters (ERMS scope)
- Mediterranean Sea : Greek Exclusive Economic Zone
