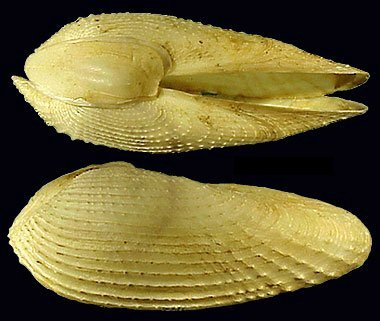
- Barnea candida

Scientific classification
- Kingdom: Animalia
- Phylum: Mollusca
- Class: Bivalvia
- Order: Myida
- Family: Pholadidae
- Genus: Barnea; Risso, 1826

= Barnea (bivalve) =

Genus of molluscs

Barnea is a genus of bivalves belonging to the family Pholadidae.

The genus has cosmopolitan distribution.

== Species ==
- Barnea alfredensis (Bartsch, 1915)
- Barnea australasiae (G. B. Sowerby II, 1849)
- Barnea birmanica (Philippi, 1849)
- Barnea candida (Linnaeus, 1758)
- Barnea davidi (Deshayes, 1874)
- Barnea dilatata (Souleyet, 1843)
- Barnea fragilis (G. B. Sowerby II, 1849)
- Barnea ghanaensis M. Huber, 2018
- Barnea japonica (Yokoyama, 1920)
- Barnea lamellosa (d'Orbigny, 1841)
- Barnea manilensis (Philippi, 1847)
- Barnea obturamentum (Hedley, 1893)
- Barnea parva (Pennant, 1777)
- Barnea pseudotruncata Nolf & Verstraeten, 2022
- Barnea saulae Kennedy, 1993
- Barnea shihchoensis Wang, 1983
- Barnea similis (Gray, 1835)
- Barnea subtruncata (G. B. Sowerby I, 1834)
- Barnea truncata (Say, 1822)
