= William Turton =

British naturalist (1762–1835)

- Born: 21 May 1762; Olveston, Gloucestershire
- Died: 28 December 1835 (aged 73); Bideford, Devon
- Education: Oriel College, Oxford (B.Med. 1791)
- Known for: Translating Linnaeus's Systema Naturae
- Scientific career
- Fields: Medicine, conchology
- Institutions: Swansea, Dublin, Teignmouth, Torquay (physician in each)
- Author abbrev. (zoology): Turton

William Turton (21 May 1762 – 28 December 1835) was an English medical doctor and naturalist. He is known for his pioneering work in conchology, and for translating Linnaeus' Systema Naturae into English.

== Biography ==
He was born at Olveston, Gloucestershire and was educated at Oriel College, Oxford, graduating B.Med. in 1791. He commenced in practice as a physician at Swansea, where he worked for fifteen years. He then moved in turn to Dublin, Teignmouth, and Torquay. He devoted his leisure time to natural history, especially conchology. He published several illustrated shell books, and a translation of Gmelin's edition of Linnaeus' Systema Naturae in 1806. His works on conchology have been described as "seminal".

In 1817, while he was a physician at Teignmouth, he treated Tom Keats, youngest brother of the Romantic poet John Keats, for consumption.

He moved to Bideford, Devon, in 1831, and died there. His shell collection is now located at the Smithsonian Institution.

The bivalve genus Turtonia (J. Alder, 1848) and the species Galeomma turtoni are named for him.

== Bibliography ==
- Turton, William (1803). A Treatise on Cold and Hot Baths, with Directions for Their Application in Various Diseases. To which is Added, a Letter ... on the Introduction and Success of the Cow Pock in the Principality of Wales (Second ed.). Swansea: Printed at the Author's Private Press. (free)
- Linnaeus, Carl (January 1806). A General System of Nature, Through the Three Grand Kingdoms of Animals, Vegetables, and Minerals, Systematically Divided Into Their Several Classes, Orders, Genera, Species, and Varieties, with their Habitations, Manners, Economy, Structure, and Peculiarities. By Sir Charles Linnè: Translated from Gmelin, Fabricius, Willdenow, &c. Translated by Turton, William. Lackington, Allen, and Company. (free)
- A Medical Glossary; in which the words in the various branches of medicine are deduced from their original languages, and explained (London, 1797, second edition 1802).
- Turton, William (1807). British Fauna, Containing a Compendium of the Zoology of the British Islands: Arranged According to the Linnean System. Swansea. (free)
- A Conchological Dictionary of the British Islands, by W. Turton, assisted by his daughter (London, 1819).
- Turton, William (1831). A manual of the land and freshwater shells of the British Islands arranged according to the more modern systems of classification; and described from perfect specimens in the author's cabinet: with coloured plates of every species. Paternoster Row, London: Rees, Orme, Brown, and Green. pp. 152 pp, 10 plates.
