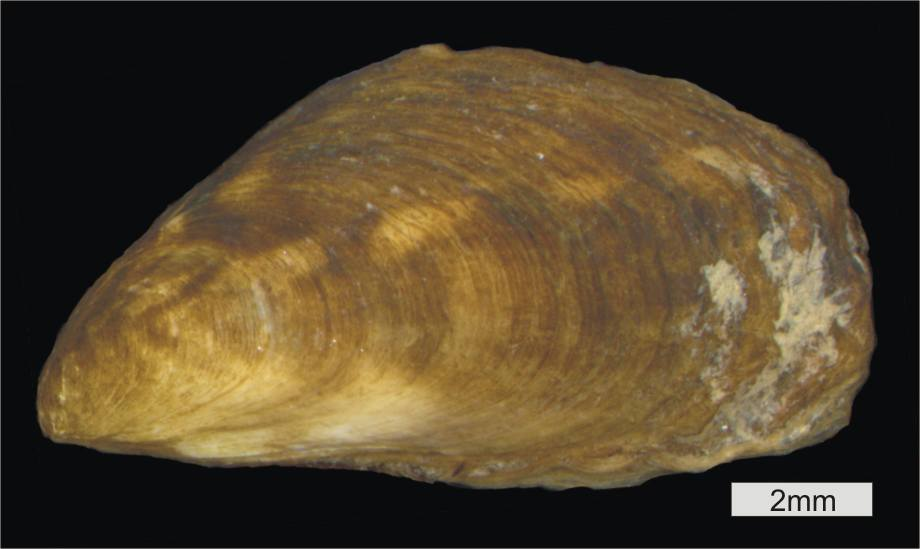

Conservation status
- Least Concern (IUCN 3.1)

- Secure (NatureServe)

Scientific classification
- Kingdom: Animalia
- Phylum: Mollusca
- Class: Bivalvia
- Order: Myida
- Superfamily: Dreissenoidea
- Family: Dreissenidae
- Genus: Mytilopsis
- Species: M. leucophaeata

Binomial name
- Mytilopsis leucophaeata (Conrad, 1831)

Synonyms
- Mytilus leucophaeatus Conrad, 1831

= Mytilopsis leucophaeata =

Species of bivalve

Mytilopsis leucophaeata is a species of small bivalve mollusc in the false mussel family, Dreissenidae. It is commonly known as Conrad's false mussel or the dark false mussel.

== Identification ==
It can look very similar to the zebra mussel, with similar stripes, but it can be distinguished from it by an apophysis or projection on the inside of the shell near the umbo. Shell length ranges between <1 and 2 cm, with an average length of 1 cm.

== Distribution ==
This species is native in the Gulf of Mexico, and spread from there via ballast water, or attached to oysters that were moved, to the Hudson River in the 1930s, and from there to other estuaries in the eastern US including Chesapeake Bay as well as to the Pernambuco coast in northeastern Brazil. This species also spread via ballast water to brackish waters in Europe, including the Baltic Sea, the North Sea, the Atlantic Ocean and the Mediterranean Sea as well as the Black Sea and the Caspian Sea.

Like the zebra mussel, this species is a significant biofouling pest in many countries, especially where it has been introduced in Europe.

== Habitat ==
Mytilopsis leucophaeata is found in brackish water, at salinities ranging from 0.5 psu to about 12 psu, although its upper salinity limit is usually about 5–6 psu. It attaches to hard substrates, including oyster and true mussel shells and cages for them, rocks, boats, and pilings, and also to ropes.
