= Mytilopsis africana =

Conservation status
- Least Concern (IUCN 3.1)

Scientific classification
- Kingdom: Animalia
- Phylum: Mollusca
- Class: Bivalvia
- Order: Myida
- Superfamily: Dreissenoidea
- Family: Dreissenidae
- Genus: Mytilopsis
- Species: M. africana

Binomial name
- Mytilopsis africana (van Beneden, 1835)

Synonyms
- Dreissena africana van Beneden, 1835

Species of bivalve

Mytilopsis africana is a species of bivalve mollusc in the false mussel family, Dreissenidae. It is widespread along the brackish water environments of coastal West and Central Africa. It may represent a lineage of Mytilopsis sallei, a Caribbean species, that invaded the western coast of Africa during the period of slave trade.

== Habitat ==
Mytilopsis africana is a brackish water species that is widespread along lagoons, mangroves, and associated habitats. It grows attached to hard surfaces such as rocks, shells, and branches.
