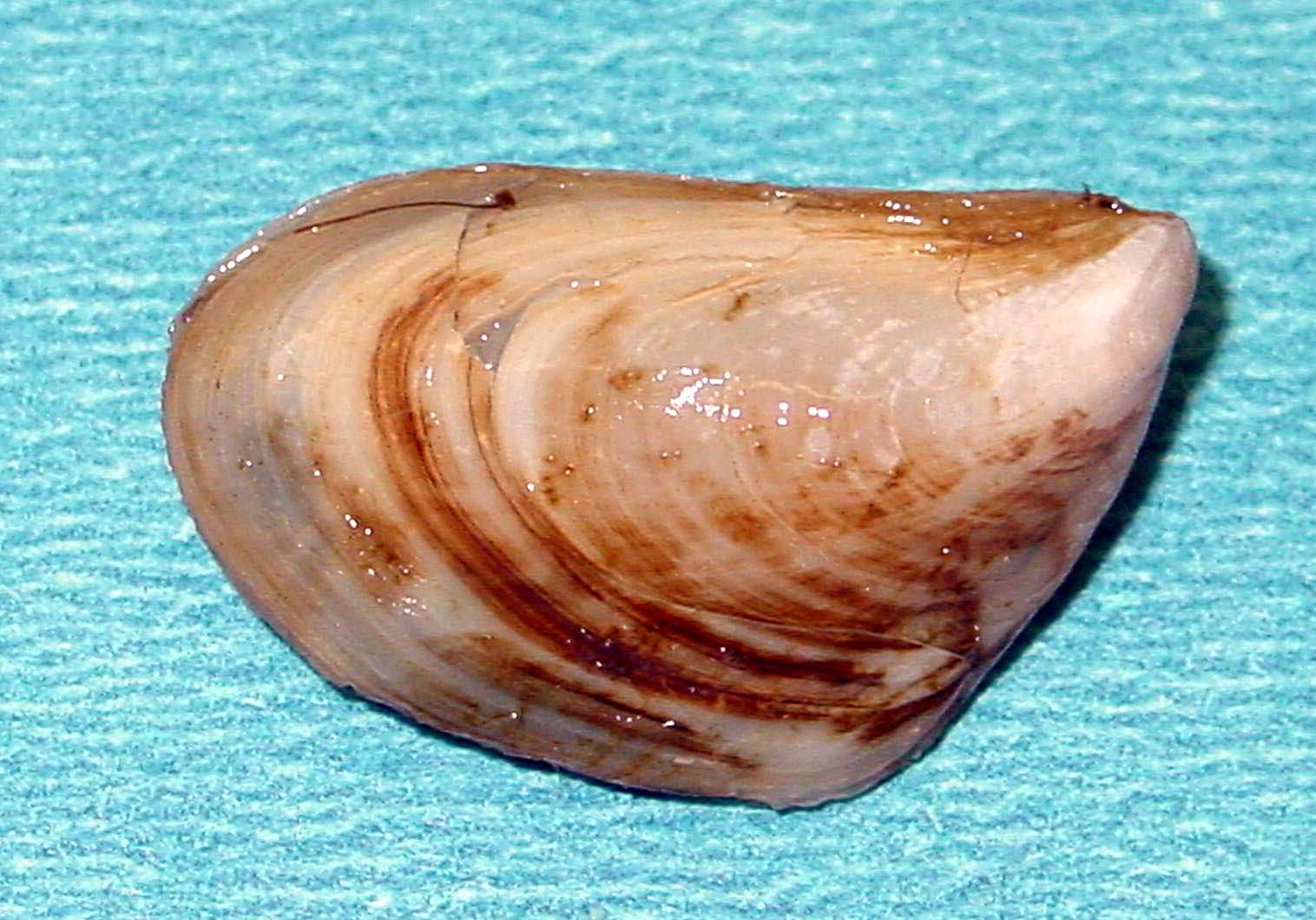
- One valve of Dreissena bugensis

Conservation status
- Least Concern (IUCN 3.1)

- Secure (NatureServe)

Scientific classification
- Kingdom: Animalia
- Phylum: Mollusca
- Class: Bivalvia
- Order: Myida
- Superfamily: Dreissenoidea
- Family: Dreissenidae
- Genus: Dreissena
- Species: D. bugensis

Binomial name
- Dreissena bugensis (Andrusov, 1897)

Synonyms
- Dreissena rostriformis bugensis

= Quagga mussel =

Species of bivalve

The quagga mussel (Dreissena bugensis) is a species of freshwater mussel, an aquatic bivalve mollusc in the family Dreissenidae. It has a lifespan of 3 to 5 years. It has sometimes been treated as a subspecies of the otherwise fossil species Dreissena rostriformis, as Dreissena rostriformis bugensis, but is currently accepted as a distinct species.

The species is indigenous to the Dnipro River drainage of Ukraine, and is named by analogy with the closely related zebra mussel after the quagga, an extinct subspecies of African zebra, possibly because, like the quagga, its 'zebra stripes' fade out towards the ventral side.

The quagga mussel is currently of major concern as an invasive species where it has spread in the rivers and lakes of Europe and also in the Great Lakes of North America, where it was brought by overseas shipping that uses the Saint Lawrence Seaway.

== Appearance ==
The quagga mussel shell is generally black, yellow and/or zig-zagged. However a large range of shell morphology is seen, including a distinct morph in Lake Erie that is pale or completely white. The shell has a rounded carina and a convex ventral side.

The quagga mussel resembles the zebra mussel, just as its namesake (quagga) resembles the zebra. The quagga mussel shell can be distinguished from the zebra mussel shell because it is paler toward the end of the hinge. It is similar in size to the zebra mussel, growing to about 4 cm (1.6 in) wide.

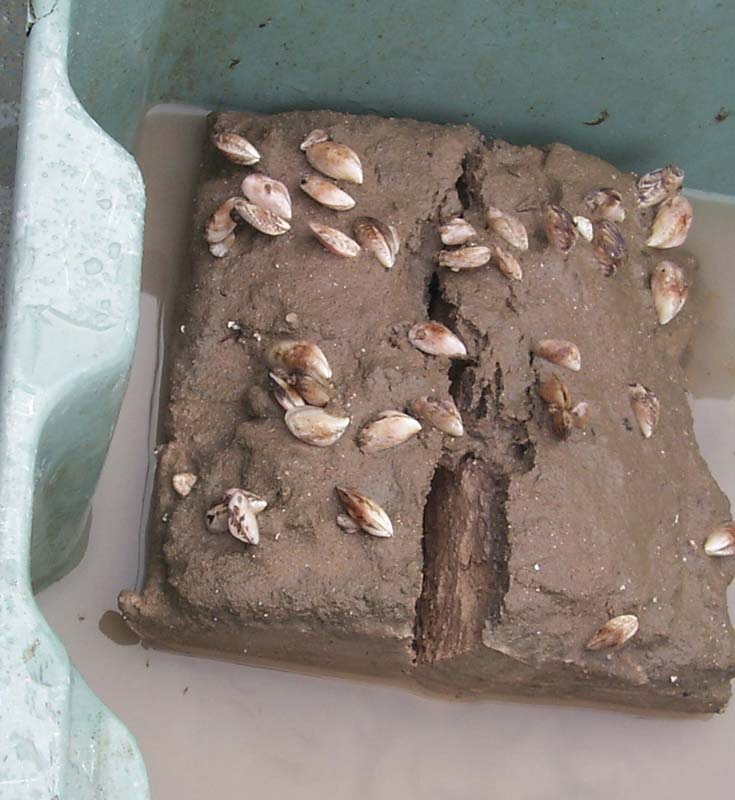
Quagga mussels in Lake Michigan sediment sample

== Diet ==
The quagga mussel is a filter feeder: it uses its cilia to pull water into its shell cavity through an incurrent siphon, where the desirable particulate matter is removed. Each adult mussel is capable of filtering a litre or more of water each day, removing phytoplankton, zooplankton, algae and even their own veligers. Any undesirable particulate matter is bound with mucus, known as pseudofaeces, and ejected out of the incurrent siphon before having a chance to move through the digestive system. Post-digestion, particle-free water is then discharged out of the excurrent siphon.

== Reproduction ==
The quagga mussel is a prolific breeder, possibly contributing to its spread and abundance. Like all Dreissena species, it is dioecious (either male or female) with external fertilisation. A fully mature female mussel is capable of producing up to one million eggs per year. After fertilisation, pelagic microscopic larvae, or veligers, develop within a few days and these veligers soon acquire minute bivalve shells. Free-swimming veligers drift with the currents for three to four weeks feeding by their hair-like cilia while trying to locate suitable substrata to settle and secure byssal threads. Mortality in this transitional stage from planktonic veliger to settled juvenile may exceed 99%. In 2019, the genome of a quagga mussel from the Danube River in Austria was sequenced, revealing how larvae use a system of intercellular 'cleavage cavities' and an expanded set of aquaporin transmembrane water channels for osmoregulation in low-salinity freshwater environments during the early stages of their development.

== Invasive species ==
=== Europe ===
Quagga mussels are presumed to have originated in the Ukrainian section of the Black Sea and probably began to spread further into eastern Europe in the 1940s. Today, they are an invasive species found throughout western Europe.

In Romania, quagga mussels were first found in 2004 in the Danube River. In Germany, quagga mussels were first identified in 2005, and now populate many inland waters, such as the Rhine–Main–Danube Canal, the Main, and the Rhine. They were first identified in Switzerland in 2015, and in Lake Constance in 2016, where they have since spread massively and caused considerable problems, in particular to the machinery in waterworks.

In 2014, the species was reported at Wraysbury Reservoir, not far from London's Heathrow Airport in the valley of the River Thames.

In Ireland, the mussels were first discovered in 2021 in two lakes on the River Shannon: Lough Derg and Lough Ree. The mussel is expected to compete with existing zebra mussels and native species, becoming widespread due to its ecological tolerance and suitability to Irish climatic conditions. By 2025, they had spread into Northern Ireland.

=== North America ===
Zebra mussels, the first dreissenid mussel introduced in North America, spread rapidly throughout many major river systems and the Great Lakes, causing substantial ecological and environmental impacts. The quagga mussel was first observed in North America in September 1989, when it was discovered in Lake Erie near Port Colborne, Ontario. It was not identified as a distinct species until 1991. By 2021 the biomass of quagga mussels in the lower four Great Lakes was estimated to be so great as to become the primary regulator of phosphorus, remetabolising and recirculating it instead of allowing it to sediment as normal.

The introduction of both dreissenid species into the Great Lakes appears to be the result of ballast water discharge from transoceanic ships that were carrying veligers, juveniles, or adult mussels. The genus Dreissena is highly polymorphic and prolific, with high potential for rapid adaptation attributing to its rapid expansion and colonisation. Other factors can aid in the spread of these species across North American waters, such as larval drift in river systems, or fishing and boating activities that allow for overland transport or movement between water basins. The success of overland transport of Dreissena species depends on their ability to tolerate periods of desiccation, and results suggest that given temperate summer conditions, adult Dreissena mussels may survive 3–5 days of aerial exposure.

In January 2007, quagga mussels were discovered at a marina in the Nevada portion of Lake Mead, and two other lakes on the Colorado River, Lake Mohave and Lake Havasu.

In 2008, the threat of quagga mussels being introduced at Lake Casitas and Westlake Lake in California from recreational boating resulted in the lakes' banning the use of outside boats. As of March 2008, other lakes such as Castaic and Lake Cachuma are considering similar bans. In June 2008, the mussels were confirmed in Lake Granby, Colorado. Larval quagga mussels were found in the water. After 5 years of negative testing Lake Granby, Colorado has been classified as a negative waterbody for quagga mussel veligers.

Quagga mussels are now in all parts of Lake Powell on the Utah and Arizona border. They were also suspected in Deer Creek Reservoir at the top of Provo Canyon in Utah, but this body of water has since been delisted as a quagga-suspected water after 3 years of negative testing.

== Ecology ==
Quagga mussels are prodigious water filterers, removing substantial amounts of phytoplankton and suspended particulates from the water. By removing the phytoplankton, quagga mussels, in turn, decrease the food source for zooplankton, therefore altering the food web. Impacts associated with the filtration of water include increases in water transparency, decreases in mean chlorophyll concentrations, and accumulation of pseudofaeces. Water clarity increases light penetration, causing a proliferation of aquatic plants that can change species dominance and alter the entire ecosystems. The pseudofaeces that are produced from filtering the water accumulate and impact the environment. As the waste particles decompose, oxygen is used up, water acidity increases (decreased pH), and toxic byproducts are produced. In addition, quagga mussels accumulate organic pollutants within their tissues to levels more than 300,000 times greater than concentrations in the environment, and these pollutants are found in their pseudofaeces, which can be passed up the food chain, therefore increasing wildlife exposure to organic pollutants. Another major threat involves the fouling of native freshwater mussels. Since quagga mussels were discovered in Lake Michigan in 1998, plankton rings formed by the passage of storms have been eaten away by the quagga mussels, threatening the local ecosystem.

Each quagga mussel can filter up to a litre of water per day, stripping away the plankton that directly and indirectly sustained the native fish. Much of that food supply has now been sucked to the lake bottom; for every unit of fish swimming in the lake today, an estimated three to four units of quagga mussels are clustering on the lake bed.

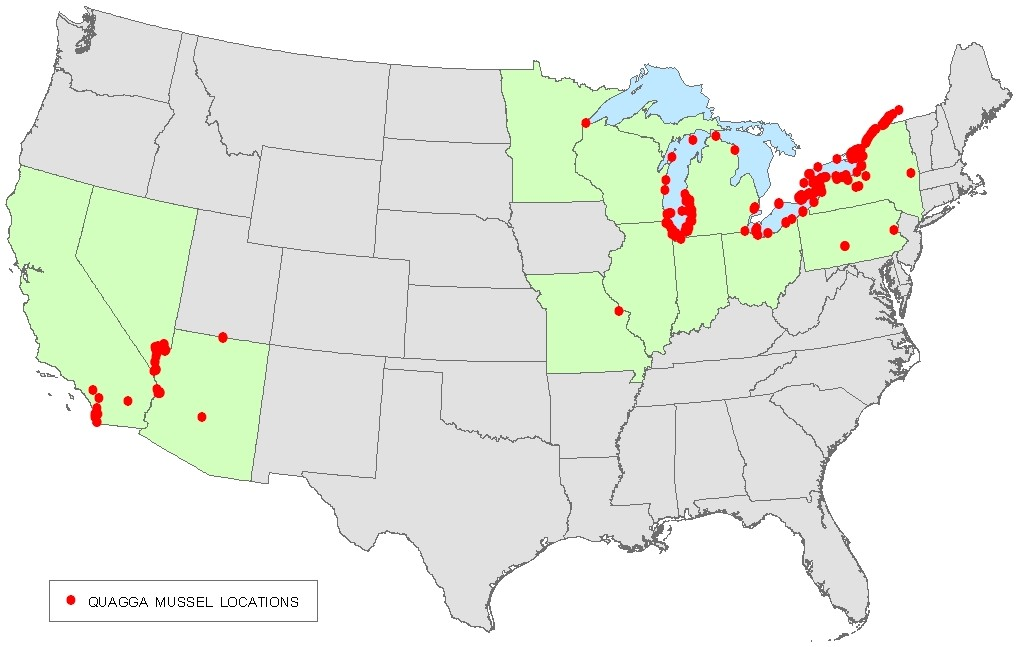
Map showing distribution of quagga mussels in the U.S.

The ability of Dreissena to colonise hard surfaces rapidly causes serious economic problems. These major biofouling organisms can clog water-intake structures, such as pipes and screens, therefore reducing pumping capabilities for power and water-treatment plants, costing industries, companies, and communities. Recreation-based industries and activities have also been impacted; docks, breakwalls, buoys, boats, and beaches have all been colonised heavily. Many of the potential impacts of Dreissena in North America are unclear due to the limited time scale of colonisation. Nonetheless, the genus Dreissena clearly is highly polymorphic and has a high potential for rapid adaptation to extreme environmental conditions, possibly leading to significant long-term impacts on North American waters. Also, the colonisation of deeper water exposes the quagga mussel to a new range of environmental conditions and new habitats.

It causes many of the same problems of stripping life-supporting algae, damaging boats, power plants, and harbours and destroying the native mussel population, as the equally invasive zebra mussel of Russia. It is also displacing native burrowing amphipod (Diporeia hoyi) from the deep waters of Lake Erie.

=== Quagga mussels as prey ===
Like other filter-feeding creatures, Quagga mussels can accumulate very high levels of pollutants in their tissues. These pollutants filter up the food chain when the mussels are eaten, and can cause serious injury or death in animals such as birds which prey on the fish which eat the mussels.

In 1994, the invasive species biologist Anthony Ricciardi determined that North American yellow perch found the invasive dreissenid species palatable. In 2004, he determined that yellow perch, over the intervening 10 years, had developed an appetite for the quagga mussel. However it was unlikely the perch could be used intensively as the feeding process introduced contaminants into the food chain, notably Clostridium botulinum.

Redear sunfish, a specialised mollusc-eating fish, are now being stocked in the Colorado River drainage as a defense against the quagga mussels. As with the yellow perch, this predator–prey relationship could cause toxins and micro-organisms to move up the food chain.

== See also ==
- Dreissena rostriformis distincta
