= Dreissena rostriformis distincta =

Scientific classification
- Kingdom: Animalia
- Phylum: Mollusca
- Class: Bivalvia
- Order: Myida
- Family: Dreissenidae
- Genus: Dreissena
- Species: D. rostriformis
- Subspecies: D. r. distincta

Trinomial name
- Dreissena rostriformis distincta (Andrusov, 1897)

Subspecies of bivalve

Dreissena rostriformis distincta is a (possible) subspecies of freshwater mussel, an aquatic bivalve mollusk in the family Dreissenidae. It was originally described in 1897 as a variety of D. rostriformis by Andrusov (Andrusov, 1897: 273-276, pl. 14, figs. 18-24.)

The type locality was numerous localities in the Volga River, Caspian, Black and Marmara seas (both Recent and fossil).

However, the exact taxonomy of the species within the genus Dreissena is uncertain. As Kantor et al. commented, "...the Russian specialists on fresh-water molluscs appeared to be “splitters” comparing with their western colleagues. This sometimes leads to extreme differences in opinion on species number and taxonomy of some groups."
