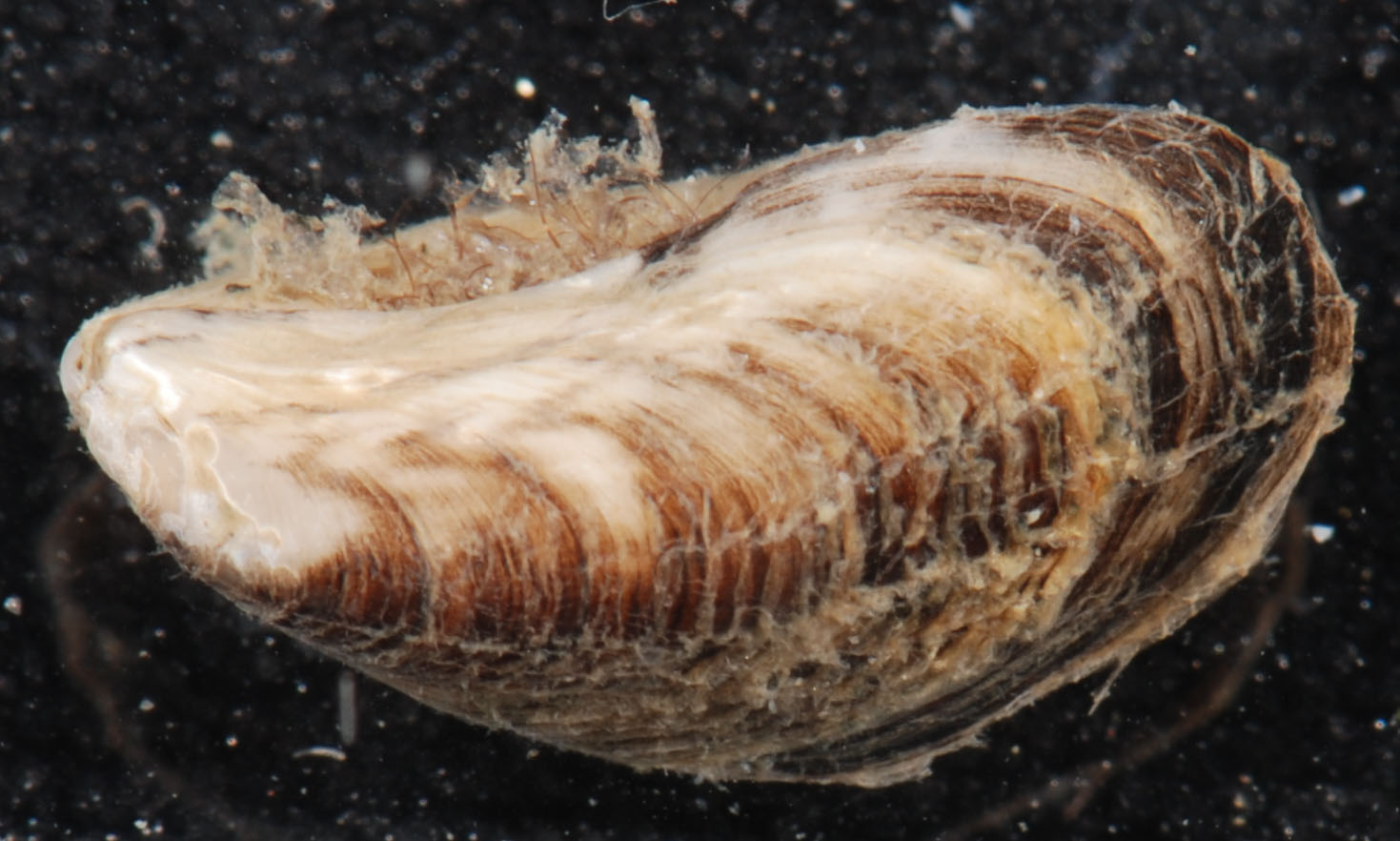

Scientific classification
- Kingdom: Animalia
- Phylum: Mollusca
- Class: Bivalvia
- Order: Myida
- Superfamily: Dreissenoidea
- Family: Dreissenidae
- Genus: Mytilopsis; Conrad, 1857

Species
- 7 species (see text)

= Mytilopsis =

Genus of bivalves

Mytilopsis is a genus of small fresh- and brackishwater mussels in the family Dreissenidae.

== Species ==
Species within the genus Mytilopsis are:

- Mytilopsis adamsi J. P. E. Morrison, 1946
- Mytilopsis africana (Van Beneden, 1835)
- Mytilopsis lacustris (Morelet, 1860)
- Mytilopsis leucophaeata (Conrad, 1831)
- Mytilopsis ornata (Morelet, 1885)
- Mytilopsis sallei (Récluz, 1849)
- Mytilopsis trautwineana (Tryon, 1866)

Synonyms:

- Mytilopsis allyneana accepted as Mytilopsis adamsi
- Mytilopsis domingensis accepted as Mytilopsis sallei
- Mytilopsis zeteki accepted as Mytilopsis adamsi
- Mytilopsis lopesi accepted as Rheodreissena lopesi
