= Congeria kusceri =

Conservation status
- Endangered (IUCN 3.1)

Scientific classification
- Kingdom: Animalia
- Phylum: Mollusca
- Class: Bivalvia
- Order: Myida
- Family: Dreissenidae
- Genus: Congeria
- Species: C. kusceri

Binomial name
- Congeria kusceri Bole, 1962
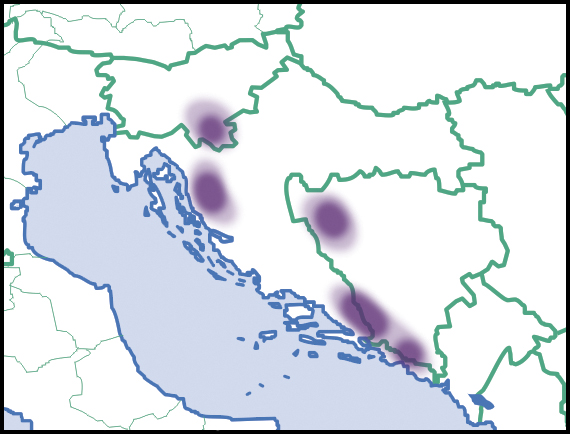

Species of bivalve

Congeria kusceri is a species of bivalve belonging to the family Dreissenidae.

Per IUCN, the species has the status "vulnerable".
