= Grippina =

Scientific classification
- Kingdom: Animalia
- Phylum: Mollusca
- Class: Bivalvia
- Order: Myida
- Family: Spheniopsidae
- Genus: Grippina; Dall, 1912

Species
- See text

Genus of bivalves

Grippina is a genus of bivalves in the family Spheniopsidae which currently consists of nine species. It was first described by William Dall in 1912 with G. californica recorded in the eastern Pacific Ocean near California, US. Their habitat spans across the Pacific Ocean, mainly centering around Australia and New Zealand, though G. coronata was found in 2015 off the coast of Rio de Janeiro, Brazil in the western Atlantic Ocean. Bivalves in the genus Grippina are part of the order Anomalodesmata, also known as septibranchs, which are carnivorous clams. They use their inhalant siphons, adapted with sensory papillae (sometimes cited as tentacles) to detect motion, to inhale microscopic crustaceans such as ostracods. As sessile, benthic predators, they lie in wait under sand and stick their siphons out into open water to feed. Their shells range in size from about 2–5 millimeters.

== Species ==
- Grippina acherontis B. A. Marshall, 2002
- Grippina aupouria (A. W. B. Powell, 1937)
- Grippina californica Dall, 1912
- Grippina coronata Machado & Passos, 2015
- Grippina globosa B. A. Marshall, 2002
- Grippina pumila B. A. Marshall, 2002
- Grippina punctata B. A. Marshall, 2002
- Grippina rex B. A. Marshall, 2002
- Grippina spirata B. A. Marshall, 2002
