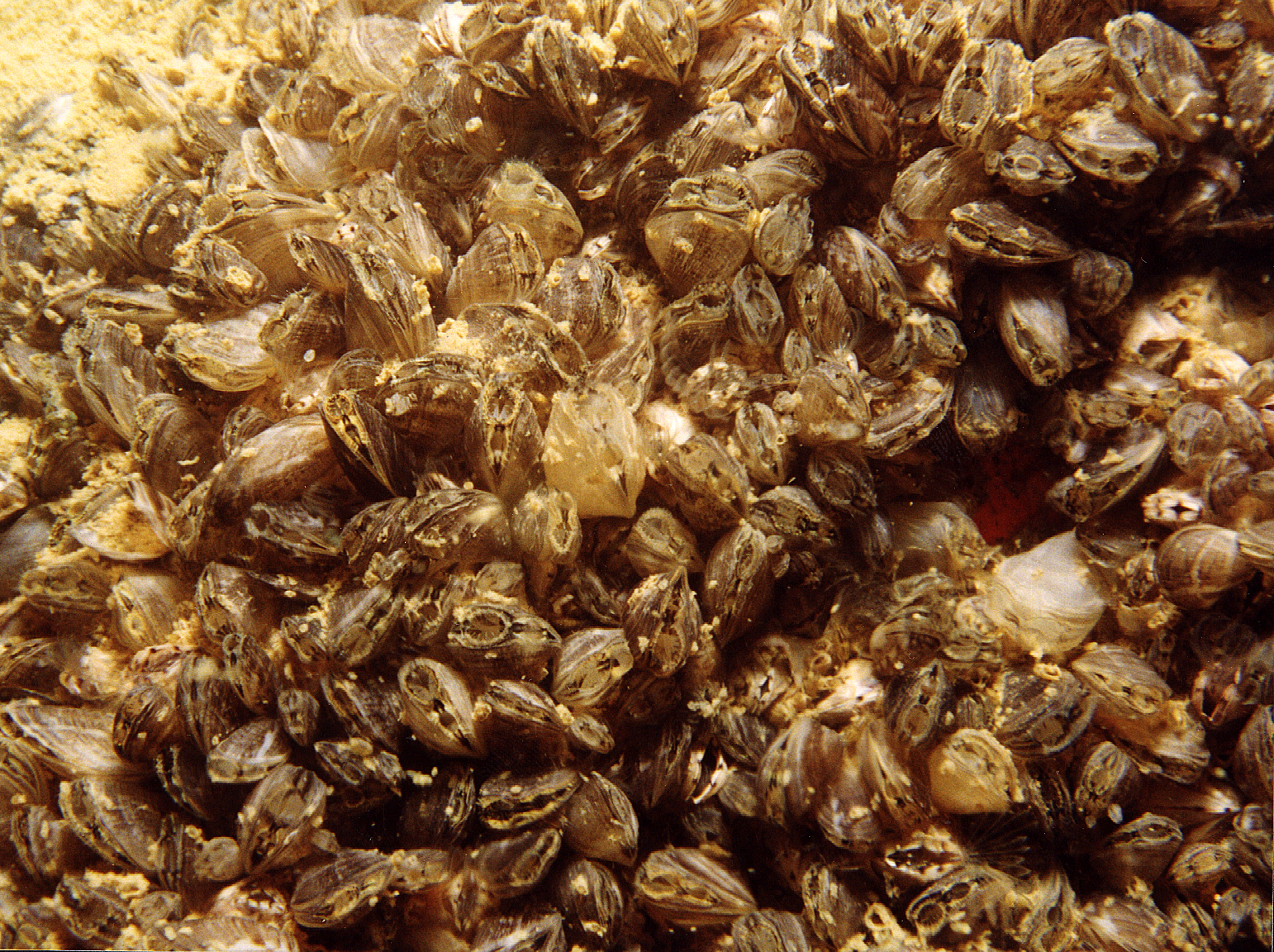

Scientific classification
- Kingdom: Animalia
- Phylum: Mollusca
- Class: Bivalvia
- Order: Myida
- Family: Dreissenidae
- Genus: Mytilopsis
- Species: M. sallei

Binomial name
- Mytilopsis sallei (Recluz, 1849)

= Mytilopsis sallei =

Species of bivalve

Mytilopsis sallei, the black-striped mussel, is a small marine bivalve mollusc in the family Dreissenidae, the false mussels.

It is closely related and ecologically similar to the zebra mussel, Dreissena polymorpha. It is also considered as highly invasive species.

== Anatomy and morphology ==
Mytilopsis shell morphology is highly variable. Shells range from 20–40mm in length, and about 10–20mm in width. The shell is brownish, greyish, and yellowish, with dark brown and white stripes. The animal inside is light orange and yellow.

== Taxonomy ==
There are seven known species of Mytilopsis, but because the morphology is so unclearly recorded, many are considered synonyms for each other. The Mytilopsis species has a highly variable shell morphology which has led to confusion. Mytilopsis are one of three genera of the family Dreissenidae, along with Congeria and Dreissena. Mytilopsis differs from Dreissena in that Mytilopsis have an internal apophysis, or hinge loop. Mytilopsis and Congeria are sister genera in the same clade.

== Behavior ==
M. sallei matures early (at 8–10 mm shell length) and possesses a fast growth rate and high fecundity. It takes about 18 months for the mussel to fully mature and 12 to sexually mature. The species exhibits the characteristics of r-strategists, producing many offspring rapidly, which may favor competition with native species and inhibit the growth of other species. M. sallei exhibits two periods of reproductive activity and settlement per year, one component in the summer and one in the winter. Recruits of one season overlap with others, assuring continued success of the species.

== Habitat and distribution ==
It typically lives in large colonies in clean, brackish water, unlike Dreissena, which inhabits only fresh water. As adults, Mytilopsis can tolerate wide fluctuations in salinity. It can also be found in intertidal and subtidal habitats as an invasive species living on a variety of substrates. Originated in the Caribbean and Mexico Bay, it has since spread to Southeast Asia and the Indo-Pacific region, much like many tropical species. It is thought that boats traveling through the Panama Canal assisted in distributing them, but some believe the species that currently inhabits Asia is different from Mytilopsis sallei and has been there all along.

M. sallei was transported to China via ballast waters, and was first recorded in Xiamen waters (Maluan Bay) in 1990 and in the Yundang Lagoon in 2000. M. sallei has also been introduced to Visakhapatnam harbour, India attached to the hulls of ships. In Taiwan, the introduction of M. sallei caused declines of native hard clams, harmful changes in aquaculture systems, and economic losses. M. sallei was first identified in Japan in 1980, in Australia in 1999 (although quickly eradicated), in Thailand in 2001, in Singapore in 2006, and in Israel in 2009. M. sallei is an alien species to Asia and Australia; it flourishes there because there are no natural controlling organisms and also because this species is highly adaptable to its environment.

== Invasive species ==
M. sallei has wide temperature, salinity, oxygen, and turbulence tolerances. The species is adapted to life in turbid estuaries with wide variations in these characteristics. M. sallei is a pest, invasive species that can inhibit growth of other species.

The species has also been associated with ecosystem damage and economic loss as they have been known to erode fishing facilities and other structures, leading scientists to believe its distribution should be carefully monitored. M. sallei are suspension feeders whose diets consist of organic matter and plankton. They can act as filters, removing particles and plankton from the water, though the effects of this ecological role are still unclear.

== Conservation status ==
M. sallei are considered aggressive invasive species, particularly in Japanese and Indian ports. They are able to quickly reproduce and mature, allowing them to take over habitats. Efforts to control the species were taken in Darwin, Australia including chemical treatment which resulted in total eradication of the population. Studies have found that treating M. sallei larvae with magnesium and ammonia ions reduces their settlement, preventing their growth and development. Little research has been done on the impacts of this invasive species as well as possible management strategies.
