= D. polymorpha =

D. polymorpha may refer to:

- Danaea polymorpha, a eusporangiate fern
- Dialeurodes polymorpha, an agricultural pest
- Diplodia polymorpha, an anamorphic fungus
- Discula polymorpha, a gastropod mollusk
- Ditaxis polymorpha, a false croton
- Dreissena polymorpha, a freshwater mussel
- Drosophila polymorpha, a small fly
- Dunaliella polymorpha, a green alga
