= Mussel foot protein =

Proteins made by mussels that allow them to anchor themselves

Mussel foot proteins (MFP) are proteins secreted by mussels that enable them to securely anchor themselves to other mussels and other underwater structures. The proteins form sticky byssal holdfast fibers (BHF). Species from several families of clams have a byssus, including pen shells (Pinnidae), true mussels (Mytilidae), and Dreissenidae.

== Synthetics ==
Research began as early as 1989, when genetic engineers inserted mussel DNA into yeast cells in an attempt to produce MFPs`.

In 2009, researchers developed a synthetic adhesive that combined MFP with inkjet printer technology.

In 2011 a group claimed to have replicated BHF, using metal-linked, self-healing fibers, with possible applications in underwater machinery, as a surgical adhesive, or as a bonding agent for implants. The fibers incorporated a long-chain polymer that could rapidly repair tears.

In 2014 another team engineered E. coli to create and mix two types of proteins with curli fibers–proteins that can create meshes. Purifying and incubating the proteins produced a dense mesh that could bind to both dry and wet surfaces.

In 2015 a group found that exposing tyrosine-rich MFPs to blue light caused a photochemical reaction in which tyrosines paired up to form tyrosine intersections, which they claimed offered better structural stability and adhesion for use in surgical glues. Animal testing indicated that it could close bleeding wounds in less than 60 seconds and heal them without inflammation or scarring.

In 2021, researchers developed a synthetic MFP hydrogel. Used alone, it adhered well to other surfaces, but tore apart under stress. Results were improved by adding synthetic spider silk that they claimed was stronger than the natural form. The result was termed tri-hybrid proteins.

== See also ==
- List of recombinant proteins
- Chelation
