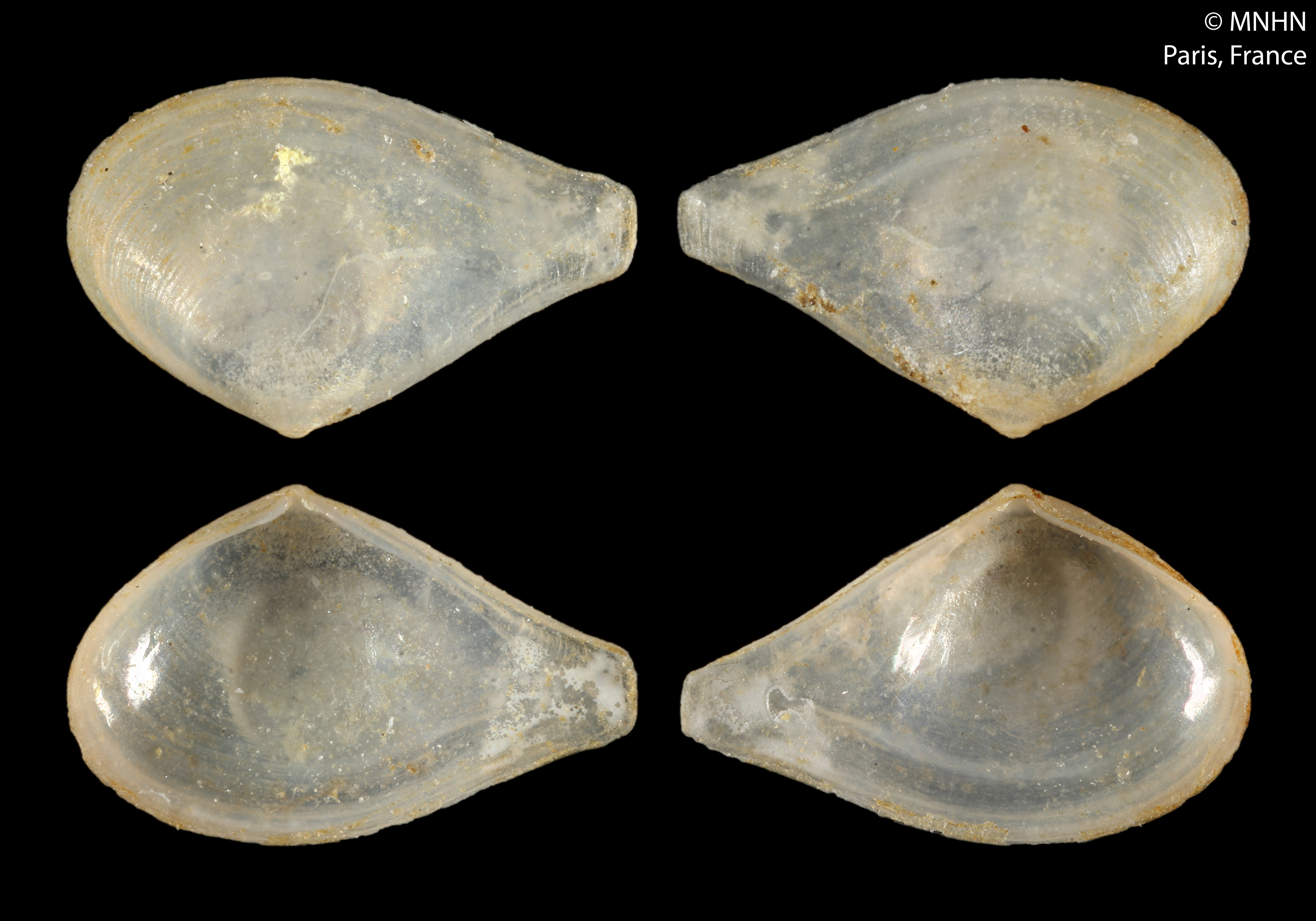
- Spheniopsis senegalensis

Scientific classification
- Domain: Eukaryota
- Kingdom: Animalia
- Phylum: Mollusca
- Class: Bivalvia
- Order: Myida
- Family: Spheniopsidae

= Spheniopsidae =

Family of bivalves

Spheniopsidae is a family of bivalves belonging to the order Myida.

Genera:

- Grippina Dall, 1912
- Spheniopsis Sandberger, 1861
