= Congeria =

Scientific classification
- Domain: Eukaryota
- Kingdom: Animalia
- Phylum: Mollusca
- Class: Bivalvia
- Order: Myida
- Family: Dreissenidae
- Genus: Congeria; Partsch, 1835

Genus of bivalves

Congeria is a genus of bivalves belonging to the family Dreissenidae.

The species of this genus are found in Europe, the Americas.

Species:

- Congeria angustiformis Gabuniya, 1953
- Congeria aquitanica Andrusov, 1897
- Congeria balatonica Partsch, 1835
- Congeria banatica Hoernes, 1875
- Congeria birladensis Jeanrenaud, 1963
- Congeria bittneri Andrusov, 1897
- Congeria bosniaskii Andrusov, 1897
- Congeria brandenburgi Brusina, 1902
- Congeria brkici Basch, 1992
- Congeria byzantica Andrusov, 1897
- Congeria ceratodus Andrusov, 1893
- Congeria dubia Mayer, 1871
- Congeria dubocaensis Stevanović, 1951
- Congeria flexuosa Taktakishvili, 1963
- Congeria florianii Lubenescu & Popescu, 1984
- Congeria getica Papaianopol, 1976
- Congeria ghergutai Jekelius, 1944
- Congeria grsici Brusina, 1902
- Congeria gundulici Brusina, 1902
- Congeria hektorovici Brusina, 1902
- Congeria hemiptycha Brusina, 1902
- Congeria homoplatoides Andrusov, 1897
- Congeria ignobilis Taktakishvili, 1973
- Congeria infantula Brusina, 1907
- Congeria inflata Taktakishvili, 1973
- Congeria jalzici B.Morton & Bilandžija, 2013
- Congeria kusceri Bole, 1962
- Congeria latiuscula Mayer, 1871
- Congeria leucippe Rzehak, 1893
- Congeria maorti Széles, 1962
- Congeria markovici (Brusina, 1884)
- Congeria mediocarinata Jeanrenaud, 1963
- Congeria michaudi Mayer, 1871
- Congeria minor Fuchs, 1877
- Congeria mulaomerovici B.Morton & Bilandžija, 2013
- Congeria mytilopsis Brusina, 1892
- Congeria navicula Andrusov, 1897
- Congeria ninnii Brusina, 1902
- Congeria nodarii Gabuniya, 1953
- Congeria novorossica (Sinzov, 1877)
- Congeria oppenheimi Hoernes, 1901
- Congeria oxyrhyncha Andrusov, 1897
- Congeria pancici Pavlović, 1927
- Congeria panticapaea Andrusov, 1897
- Congeria partschi Cžjžek, 1849
- Congeria praerhomboidea Stevanović, 1951
- Congeria pseudorostriformis Sinzov, 1896
- Congeria rhodanica Fontannes, 1882
- Congeria rhomboidea M.Hörnes, 1870
- Congeria savuli Jeanrenaud, 1963
- Congeria solitaria Brusina, 1902
- Congeria spathulata Partsch, 1835
- Congeria stefanii Andrusov, 1897
- Congeria stiriaca Rolle, 1858
- Congeria subglobosa Partsch, 1835
- Congeria subrhomboidea Andrusov, 1897
- Congeria susedana Vrsaljko & Sremac, 1999
- Congeria suspecta Brusina, 1902
- Congeria tacutai Jeanrenaud, 1963
- Congeria touzini Andrusov, 1897
- Congeria transcaucasica Davitashvili, 1934
- Congeria vugroveci Sremac, 1981
- Congeria waehneri Andrusov, 1897
- Congeria zsigmondyi Halaváts, 1882
