= Spheniopsis =

Scientific classification
- Kingdom: Animalia
- Phylum: Mollusca
- Class: Bivalvia
- Order: Myida
- Family: Spheniopsidae
- Genus: Spheniopsis; F. Sandberger, 1861

Species
- See text

Genus of bivalves

Spheniopsis is a genus of bivalves in the family Spheniopsidae which currently consists of five species. Species such as S. brasiliensis live in the western Atlantic Ocean off the coast of Brazil at depths of 17–148 meters. Bivalves in this genus are part of the order Anomalodesmata, also known as septibranchs, which are carnivorous clams.

== Species ==
- Spheniopsis brasiliensis Machado & Passos, 2015
- Spheniopsis frankbernardi Coan, 1990
- Spheniopsis sculpturata Coan & Valentich-Scott, 2012
- Spheniopsis senegalensis Cosel, 1995
- Spheniopsis triquetra (A. E. Verrill & K. J. Bush, 1898)
