= Pseudofeces =

Mucus bound masses with indigestable material suspended in it created by bivalves

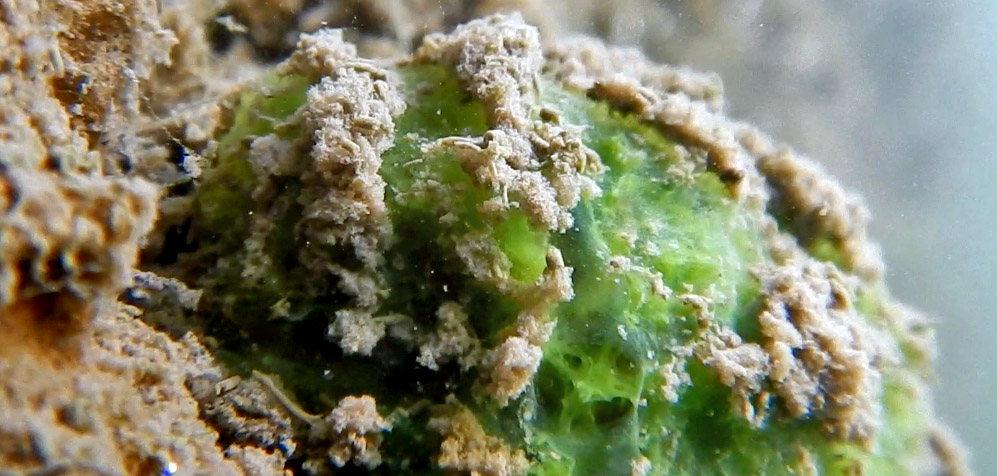
Pseudofeces of zebra mussel, photographed in the Deûle river (North of France).

Pseudofeces or pseudofaeces are a specialized method of expulsion that filter-feeding bivalve mollusks (and filter-feeding gastropod mollusks) use in order to get rid of suspended particles such as particles of grit which cannot be used as food, and which have been rejected by the animal. The rejected particles are wrapped in mucus, and are then expelled without having passed through the digestive tract. Thus, although they may closely resemble the mollusk's real feces, they are not actually feces, hence the name pseudofeces, meaning false feces.

== Occurrence ==
Bivalves which exhibit this behavior are numerous and include Ostreidae oysters (such as Crassostrea) and Dreissenidae false mussels (such as Dreissena). Gastropods which filter feed are in a minority, but include the mudsnail genus Batillaria and deep sea vent limpets in the family Lepetodrilidae.

== Process ==
Bivalves have two siphons or apertures at the posterior edge of their mantle cavity: an inhalant or incurrent siphon, and an exhalant or excurrent siphon or aperture. The water is circulated by the action of the gills. Usually water enters the mantle cavity through the inhalant siphon, moves over the gills, and leaves through the exhalent siphon. The water current is utilized for respiration, but it is also used for feeding, and for reproduction. The mouth of the bivalve is situated anterior to the gills. The bivalve utilizes phytoplankton as its food source, but the water circulating through the bivalve also usually contains other particles, such as small grains of sand, detritus, etc.

After moving over the gill margins, particles reach the mouth of the bivalve. Each side of the mouth of the bivalve has an inner and an outer appendage called a palp. The outer palp has a long extensible proboscis, which collects incoming particulate matter. The particles are then sorted by both the inner and outer palps, which have ciliated grooves for collecting organic material. These food grooves sort the particles by both density and size. The inner pair of palps transfers smaller and lighter particles, such as phytoplankton, to the mouth, using ciliary currents. Some material is rejected because it is too large or too dense: this is often pieces of sediment or detritus, but also includes some overly large edible particles. The outer palps send this rejected material into the mantle cavity as a mucus-bound mass. These mucus-bound masses are the pseudofeces.

Pseudofeces accumulate with, and look much like, the actual feces in the bottom of the mantle cavity. The unwanted material is periodically ejected (usually through the inhalant siphon or aperture) by contractions of the adductor muscles, which "clap" the shells together, pushing most of the water out of the mantle cavity and forcibly ejecting both the feces and the pseudofeces.

Planktonic food is not usually in short supply, and therefore accidentally rejecting a few larger edible particles along with the larger or denser inedible ones is a small price to pay in order to optimize the processing of the rest of the food.

== Human relevance ==
Land runoff containing particulate pollutants and excess nutrients often causes problems in estuaries and coastal waters. Bivalves can filter the particulate pollutants, and either eat them or discharge them as pseudofeces deposits onto the benthic substrate, where they are then relatively harmless. Chesapeake Bay's once-flourishing oyster populations historically filtered the estuary's entire water volume of excess nutrients every three or four days.
