= Siphon (mollusc) =

Anatomical structure which is part of the body of some aquatic molluscs

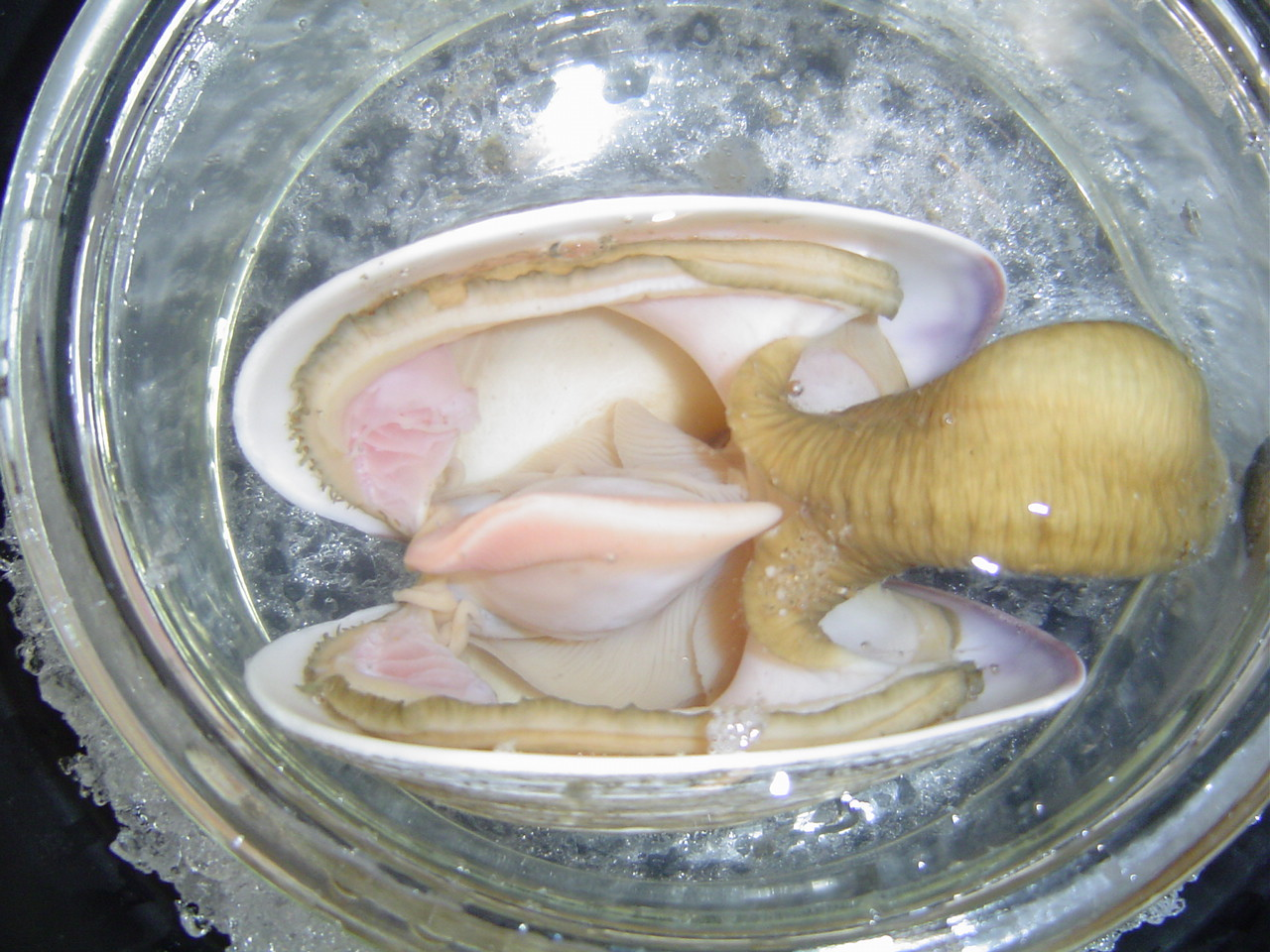
A specimen of a venerid bivalve. The adductor muscles have been cut, the valves are gaping. The internal anatomy is visible, including the paired siphons to the right

A siphon is an anatomical structure which is part of the body of aquatic molluscs in three classes: Gastropoda, Bivalvia and Cephalopoda (members of these classes include saltwater and freshwater snails, clams, octopus, squid and relatives).

Siphons in molluscs are tube-like structures in which water (or, more rarely, air) flows. The water flow is used for one or more purposes such as locomotion, feeding, respiration, and reproduction. The siphon is part of the mantle of the mollusc, and the water flow is directed to (or from) the mantle cavity.

A single siphon occurs in some gastropods. In those bivalves which have siphons, the siphons are paired. In cephalopods, there is a single siphon or funnel which is known as a hyponome.

== In gastropods ==
Melo amphora moving across coral at low tide

In some (but not all) sea snails, marine gastropod molluscs, the animal has an anterior extension of the mantle called a siphon, or inhalant siphon, through which water is drawn into the mantle cavity and over the gill for respiration.

This siphon is a soft fleshy tube-like structure equipped with chemoreceptors which "smell" or "taste" the water, in order to hunt for food. Marine gastropods that have a siphon are either predators or scavengers.

Although in gastropods the siphon functions perfectly well as a tube, it is not in fact a hollow organ, it is simply a flap of the mantle that is rolled into the shape of a tube.

In many marine gastropods where the siphon is particularly long, the structure of the shell has been modified in order to house and protect the soft tissue of the siphon. This shell modification is known as the siphonal canal. For a gastropod whose shell has an exceptionally long siphonal canal, see Venus comb murex.

In the case of some other marine gastropod shells, such as the volute and the Nassarius pictured to the right, the shell has a simple "siphonal notch" at the anterior edge of the aperture instead of a long siphonal canal.

The Aplysia gill and siphon withdrawal reflex is a defensive reflex which is found in sea hares of the genus Aplysia; this reflex has been much studied in neuroscience.

=== Siphon as a snorkel ===
Freshwater apple snails in the genera Pomacea and Pila have an extensible siphon made from a flap of the left mantle cavity. They use this siphon in order to breathe air while they are submerged in water which has a low oxygen content so they cannot effectively use their gill.

Apple snails use the siphon in a way that is reminiscent of a human swimmer using a snorkel, except that the apple snail's siphon can be retracted completely, or extended to various lengths as needed.

For these freshwater snails, the siphon is an anti-predator adaptation. It reduces their vulnerability to being attacked and eaten by birds because it enables the apple snails to breathe without having to come all the way up to the surface, where they are easily visible to predators.

The shells of these freshwater snails have simple round apertures; there is no special notch for the siphon.

== Paired siphons of bivalves ==
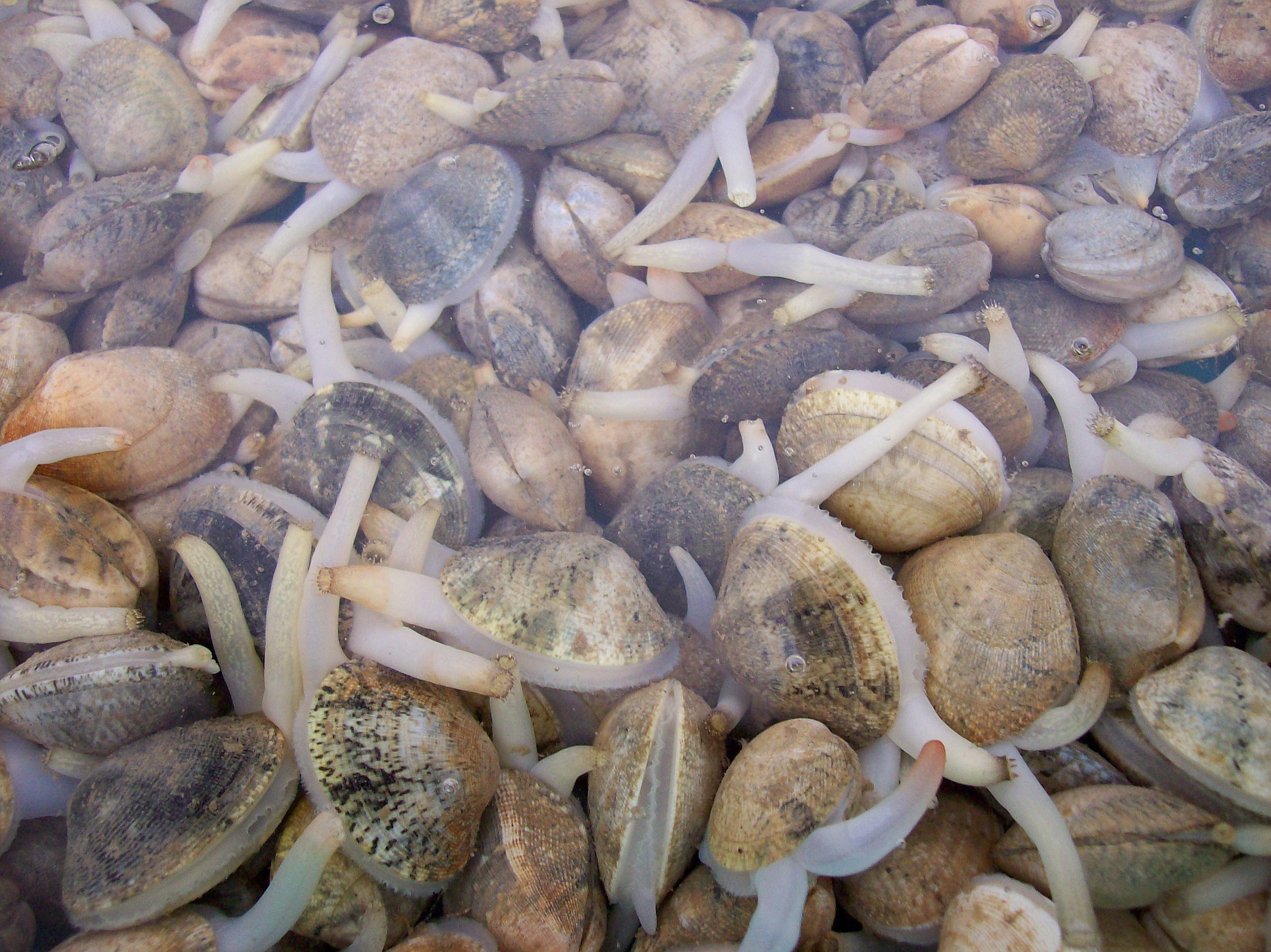
Veneridae with siphons out

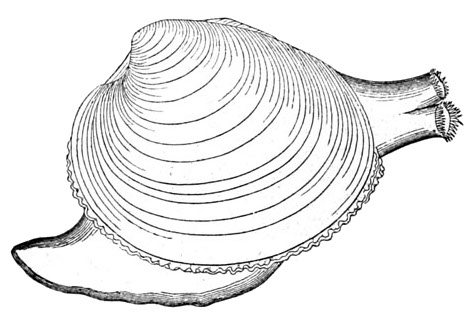
Drawing of the venerid Venus verrucosa showing paired siphons (upper inhalant and lower exhalant siphon), shell and foot.

Those bivalves that have siphons, have two of them. Not all bivalves have siphons however: those that live on or above the substrate, as is the case in scallops, oysters, etc., do not need them. Only those bivalves that burrow in sediment, and live buried in the sediment, need to use these tube-like structures. The function of these siphons is to reach up to the surface of the sediment, so that the animal is able to respire, feed, and excrete, and also to reproduce.

The deeper a bivalve species lives in the sediment, the longer its siphons are. Bivalves which have extremely long siphons, like geoducks, live very deeply buried, and are hard to dig up when clamming.

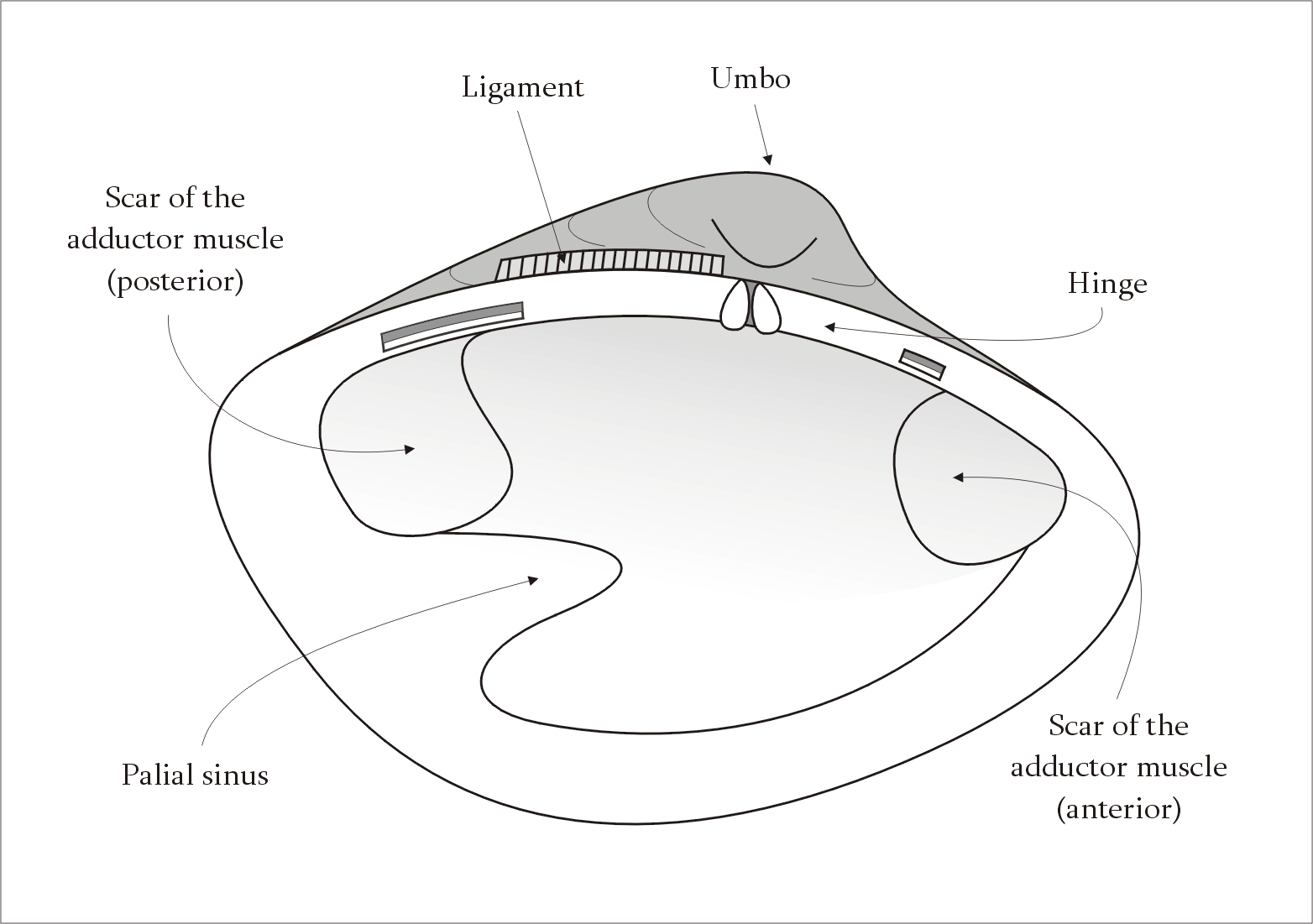
Diagramatic drawing of the inside of one valve of a bivalve such as a venerid: pallial sinus on the lower left, at the posterior end of the clam

Many bivalves that have siphons can withdraw them completely into the shell when needed, but this is not true of all species. Bivalves that can withdraw the siphons into the shell have a "pallial sinus", a sort of pocket, into which the siphons can fit when they are withdrawn, so that the two shell valves can close properly. The existence of this pocket shows even in an empty shell, as a visible indentation in the pallial line, a line which runs along parallel to the ventral margin of the shell.

The bivalve's two siphons are situated at the posterior edge of the mantle cavity. There is an inhalant or incurrent siphon, and an exhalant or excurrent siphon. The water is circulated by the action of the gills. Usually water enters the mantle cavity through the inhalant siphon, moves over the gills, and leaves through the exhalant siphon. The water current is utilized for respiration, but also for filter feeding, excretion, and reproduction.

=== Feeding ===
Depending on the species and family concerned, some bivalves utilize their inhalant siphon like the hose of a vacuum cleaner, and actively suck up food particles from the marine substrate. Most other bivalves ingest microscopic phytoplankton as food from the general water supply, which enters via the inhalant siphon and reaches the mouth after passing over the gill.

Please also see pseudofeces.

== Hyponome of cephalopods ==
The hyponome or siphon is the organ used by cephalopods to expel water, a function that produces a locomotive force. The hyponome developed from the foot of the molluscan ancestor.

Water enters the mantle cavity around the sides of the funnel, and subsequent contraction of the hyponome expands and then contracts, expelling a jet of water.

In most cephalopods, such as octopus, squid, and cuttlefish, the hyponome is a muscular tube. The hyponome of the nautilus differs however, in that it is a one-piece flap that is folded over. Whether ammonites possessed a hyponome and if so what form it may have taken, is as of yet not known.

== Gallery ==
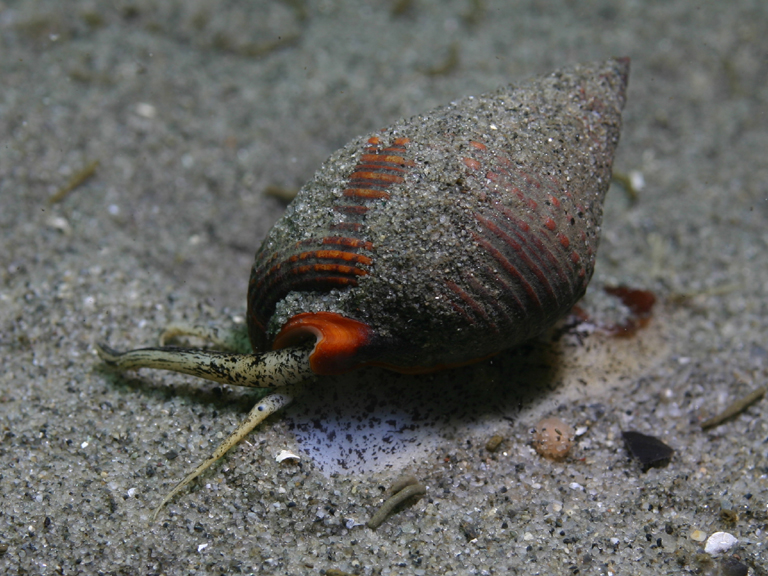
The sea snail Nassarius fossatus is a scavenger. Siphon on the left

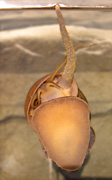
Pomacea canaliculata, seen through glass, has reached its siphon up to the water surface to breathe air

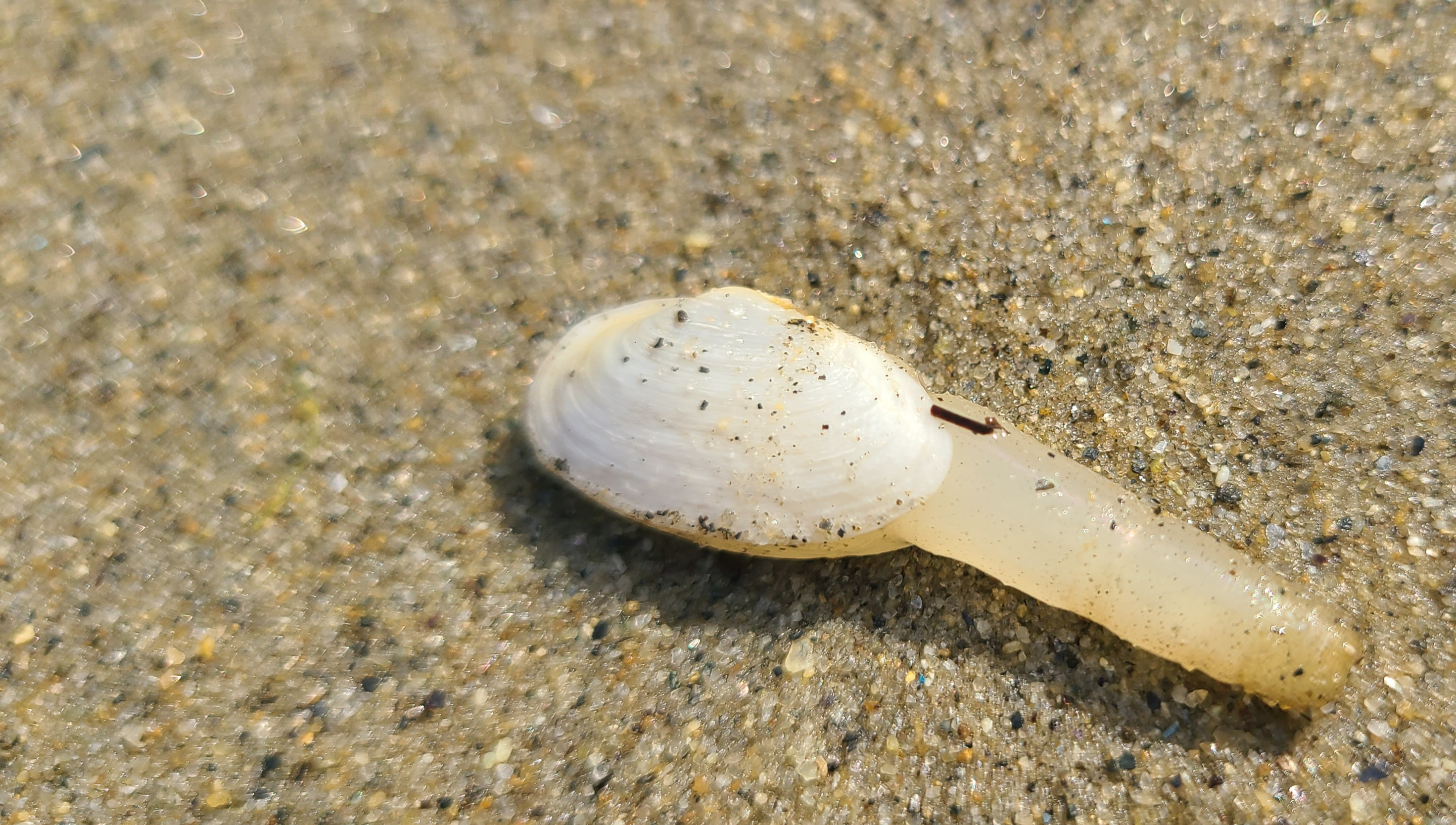
Clam with its siphon out

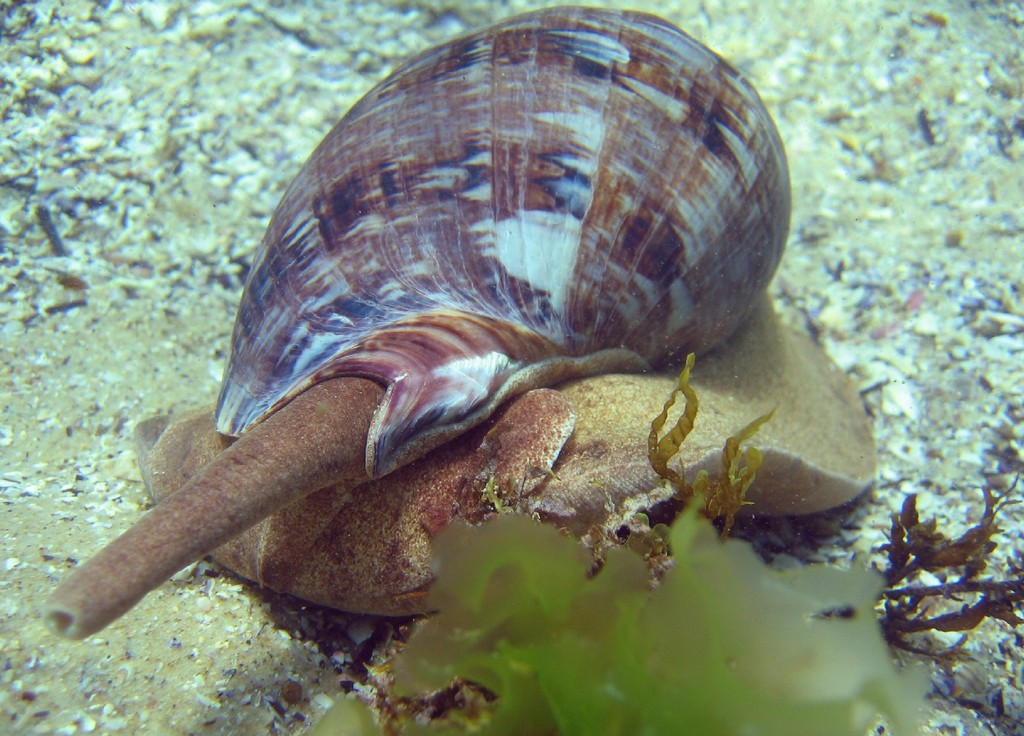
The siphon of a large herbivore marine volute, Cymbiola magnifica

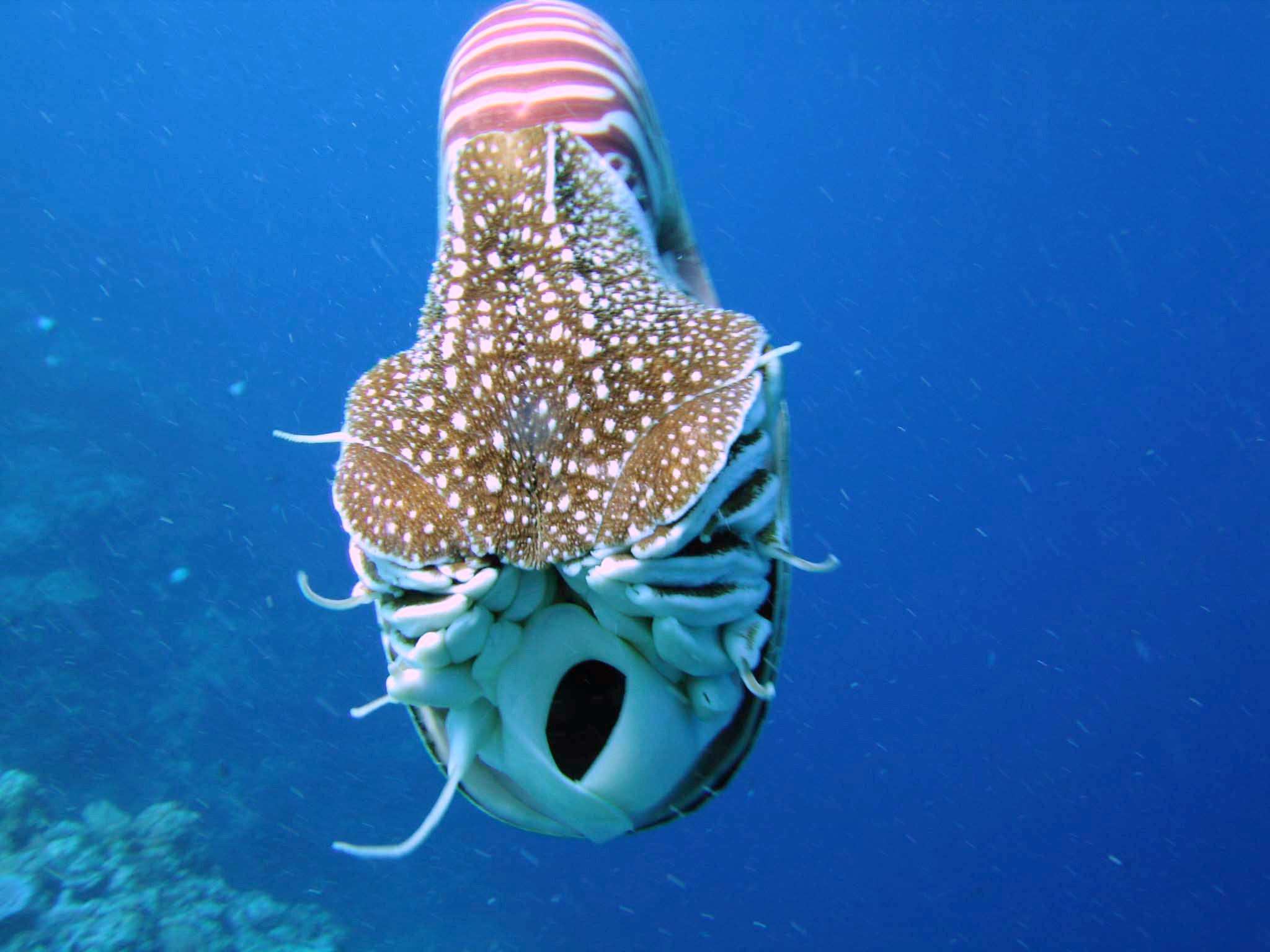
Nautilus belauensis seen from the front, showing the opening of the hyponome.

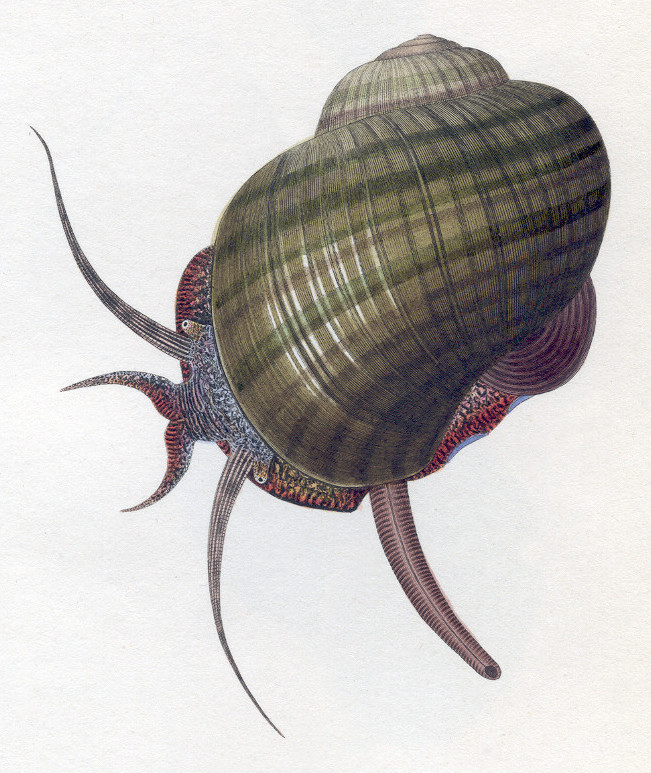
Engraving of Florida freshwater applesnail Pomacea paludosa; siphon on lower right

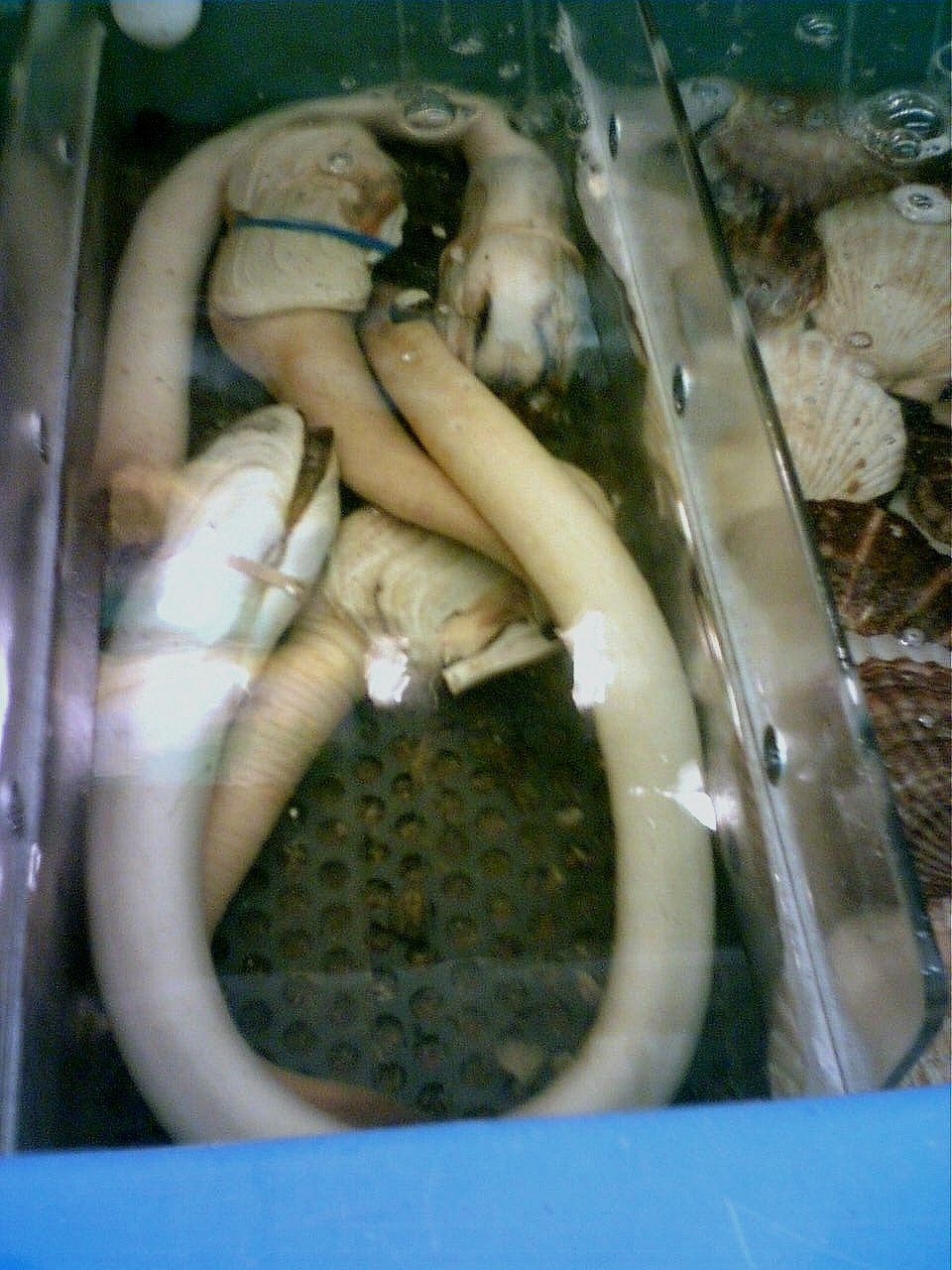
Four specimens of Panopea generosa in a seafood tank; the paired siphons (or "necks") of this species can be one meter long
