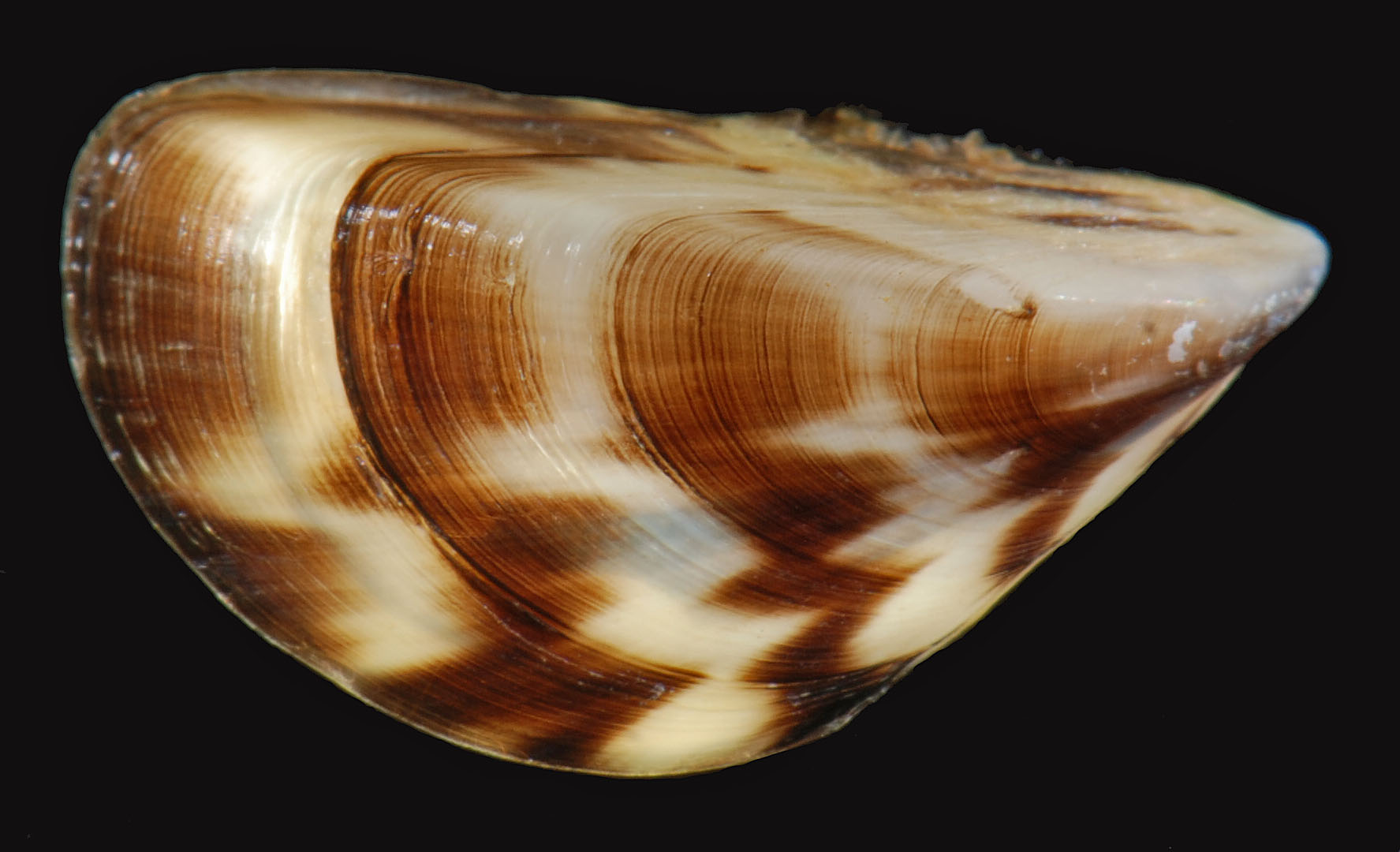

Conservation status
- Least Concern (IUCN 3.1)

- Secure (NatureServe)

Scientific classification
- Kingdom: Animalia
- Phylum: Mollusca
- Class: Bivalvia
- Order: Myida
- Family: Dreissenidae
- Genus: Dreissena
- Species: D. polymorpha

Binomial name
- Dreissena polymorpha (Pallas, 1771)

= Zebra mussel =

Species of bivalve

The zebra mussel (Dreissena polymorpha) is a small freshwater mussel, an aquatic bivalve mollusc in the family Dreissenidae. The species originates from the lakes of southwestern Russia and southeastern Europe, but has been accidentally introduced to numerous other areas and has become an invasive species in many countries in the Northern Hemisphere. Since the 1980s, the species has invaded the Great Lakes, Hudson River, Lake Travis, Finger Lakes, Lake Bonaparte, and Lake Simcoe. The adverse effects of dreissenid mussels on freshwater systems have led to their classification as among the world's most invasive aquatic species.

The species was first described in 1768 by German zoologist Peter Simon Pallas in the Ural, Volga, and Dnieper Rivers. Zebra mussels get their name from a striped pattern commonly seen on their shells, though it is not universally present. They are usually about the size of a fingernail, but can grow to a maximum length around 50 mm (2 in). Their shells are D-shaped, and attached to the substrate with strong byssal fibres, which come out of their umbo on the dorsal (hinged) side.

Right and left valve of the same specimen:

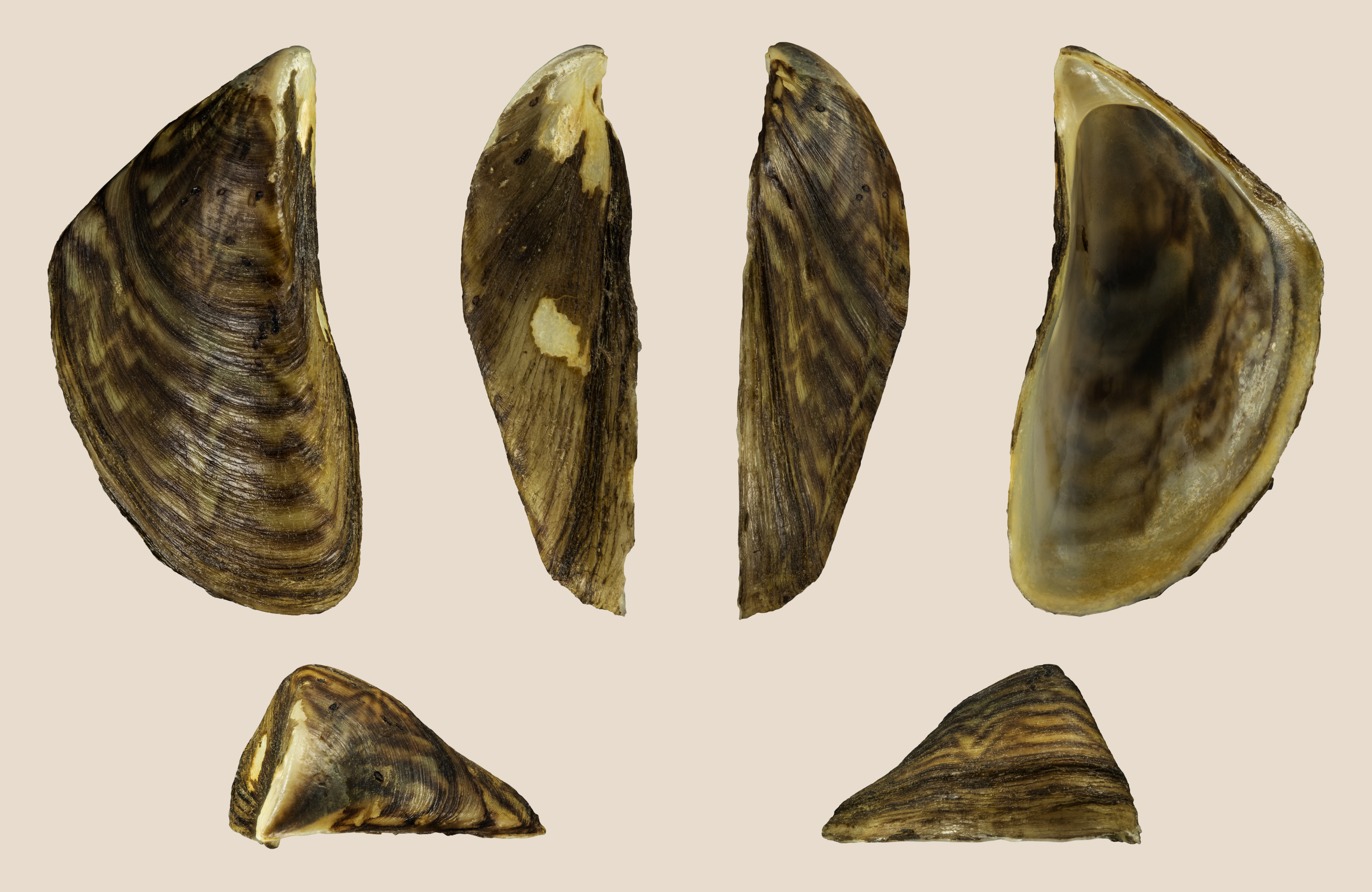
Right valve

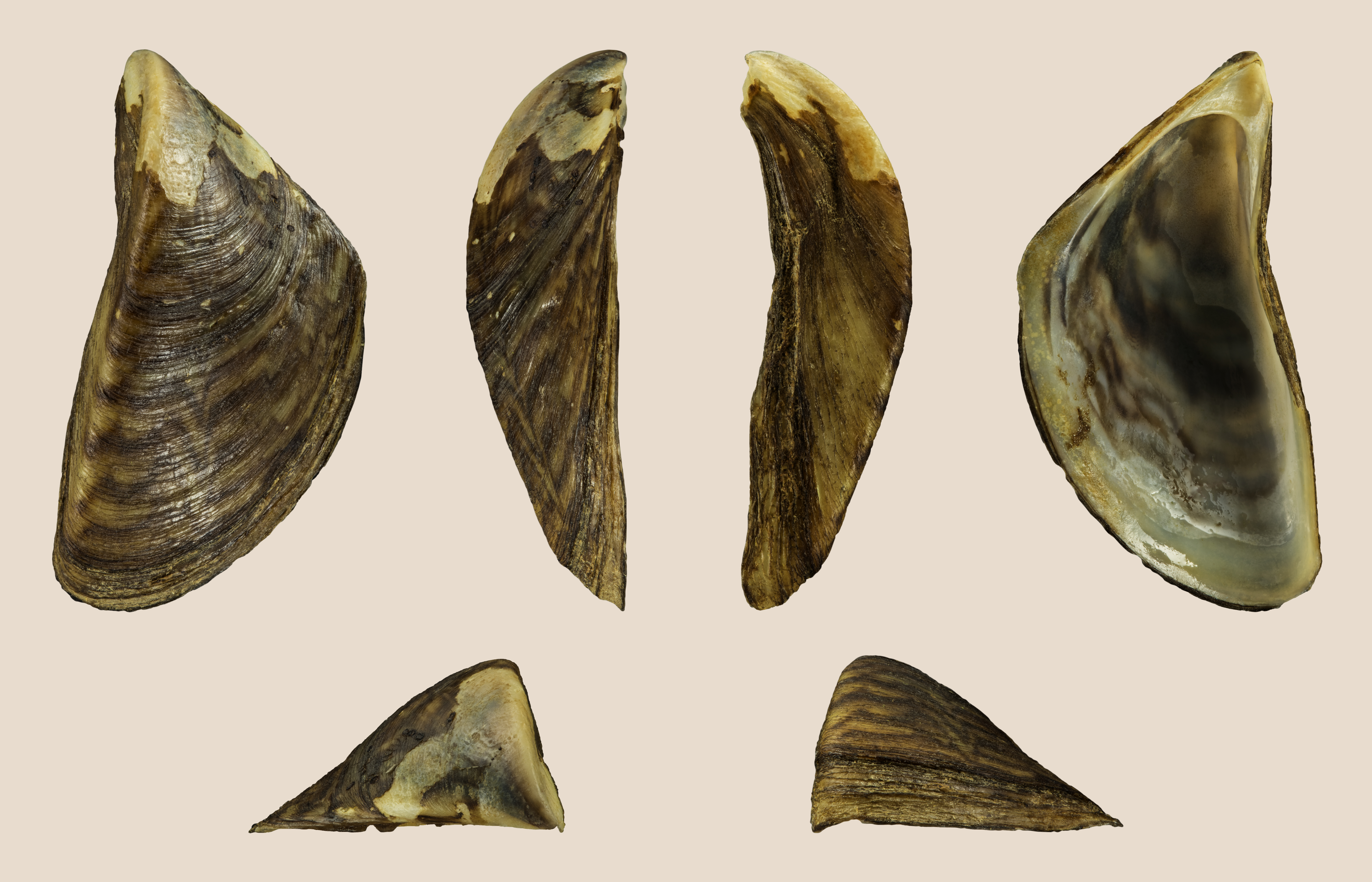
Left valve

== Ecology ==
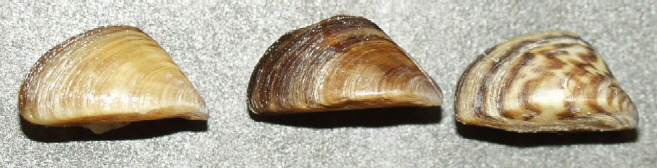

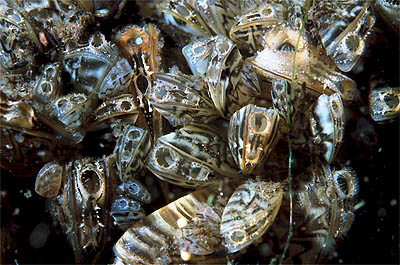

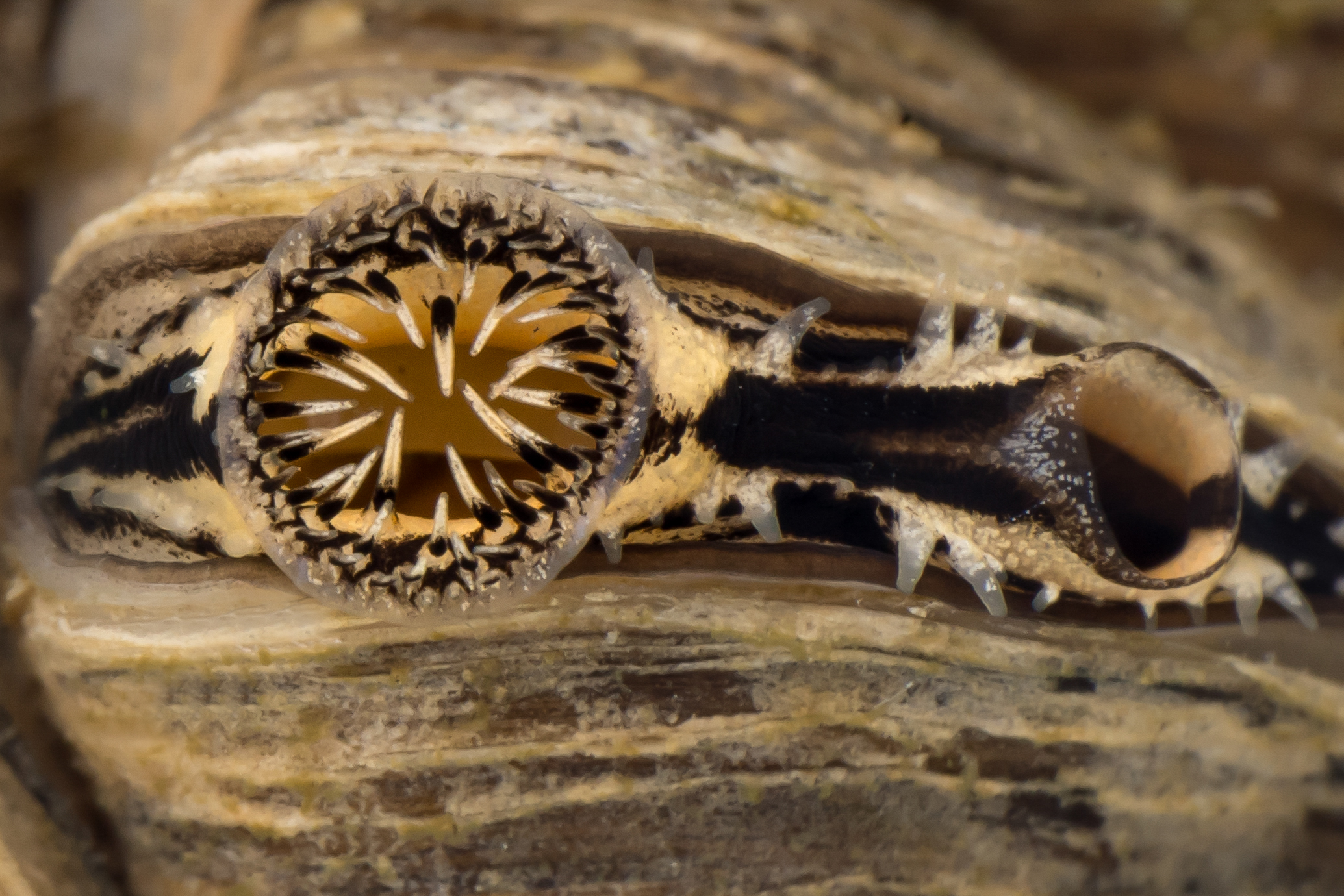
Closeup of siphon

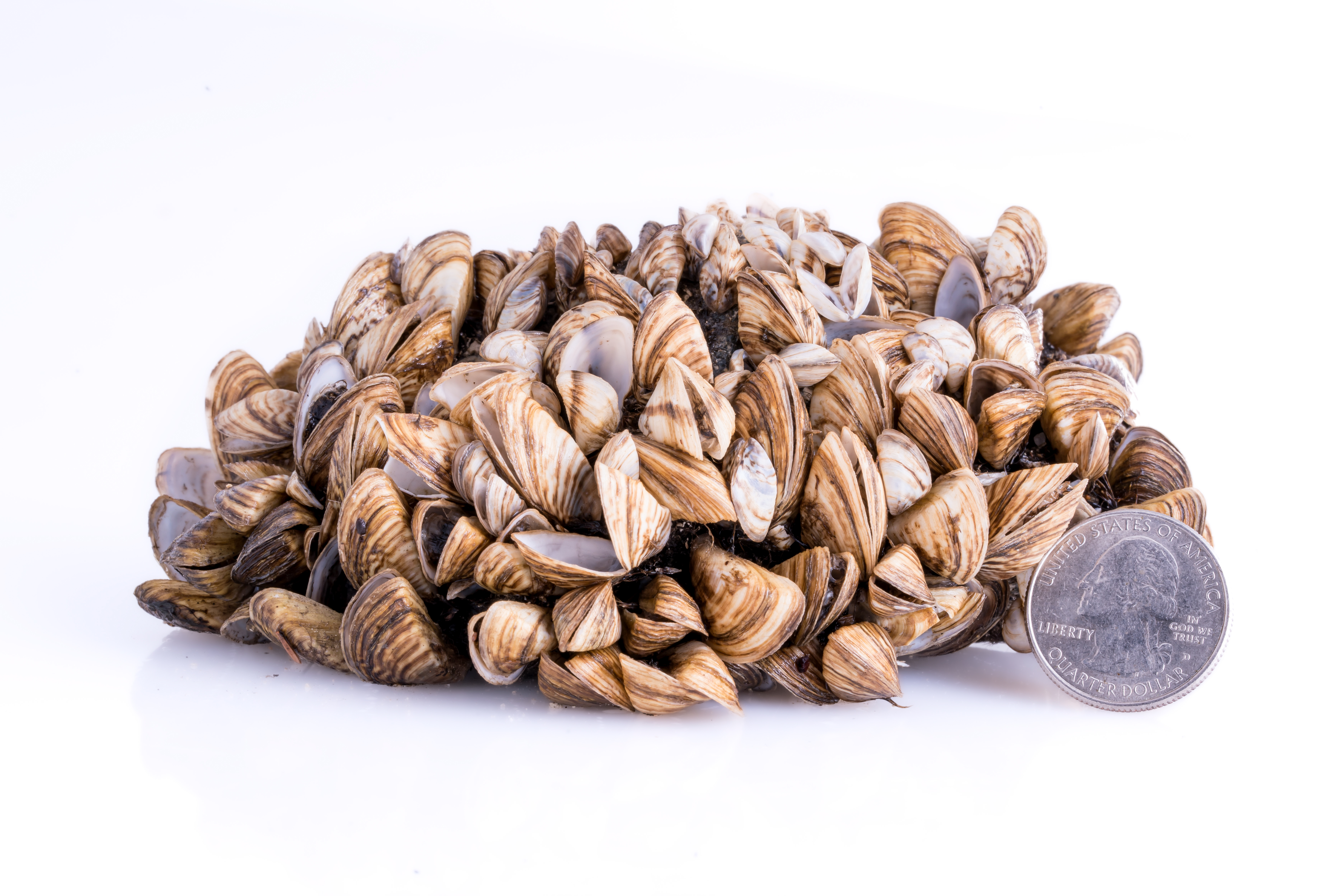
With a quarter for scale

Zebra mussels and the closely related and ecologically similar quagga mussels are filter-feeding organisms; they remove particles from the water column. Zebra mussels process up to 1 litre (0.26 US gal; 34 US fl oz) of water per day, per mussel. Some particles are consumed as food, and faeces are deposited on lakes floor. Nonfood particles are combined with mucus and other matter and deposited on lake floors as pseudofaeces. Since the zebra mussel has become established in Lake Erie, water clarity has increased from 15 cm (6 in) to up to 1 m (3 ft) in some areas. This increased water clarity allows sunlight to penetrate deeper, enabling growth of submerged macrophytes. These plants, when decaying, wash up on shorelines, fouling beaches and causing water-quality problems.

Lake-floor food supplies are enriched by zebra mussels, which filter pollutants from the water. This biomass becomes available to bottom-feeding species and to the fish that feed on them. The catch of yellow perch increased five-fold after the invasion of zebra mussels into Lake St. Clair.

Zebra mussels attach to most substrates, including sand, silt, and harder substrates, but usually juveniles prefer harder, rockier substrates on which to attach. Other mussel species frequently represent the most stable objects in silty substrates, and zebra mussels attach to and often kill these mussels. They build colonies on native unionid clams, reducing their ability to move, feed, and breed, eventually leading to their deaths. This has led to the near extinction of the unionid clams in Lake St. Clair and the western basin of Lake Erie. This pattern is being repeated in Ireland, where zebra mussels have eliminated the two freshwater mussels from several waterways, including some lakes along the River Shannon in 1997.

In 2012, the National University of Ireland, Galway, said "the discovery of zebra mussels (Dreissena polymorpha) in Lough Derg and the lower Shannon region in 1997 has led to considerable concern about the potential ecological and economic damage that this highly invasive aquatic nuisance species can cause."

The zebra mussel is a freshwater species and cannot survive in the ocean.

=== Life cycle ===
The lifespan of a zebra mussel is three to five years. A female zebra mussel begins to reproduce within 6–7 weeks of settling. An adult female zebra mussel can produce 30,000 to 40,000 eggs in each reproductive cycle, and over 1 million each year. Free-swimming microscopic larvae, called veligers, drift in the water for several weeks and then settle onto any hard surface they can find. Zebra mussels also can tolerate a wide range of environmental conditions, and adults can even survive out of water for about seven days.

=== Indicators of environmental pollution ===
Zebra mussels can be used to detect risks to humans from environmental hazards and are considered effective indicators of environmental pollution. Exposure of D. polymorpha gill cells to model contaminants representative of water pollution was found to cause DNA damage measured as the formation of 8-oxodG and DNA strand breaks.

=== Predators ===
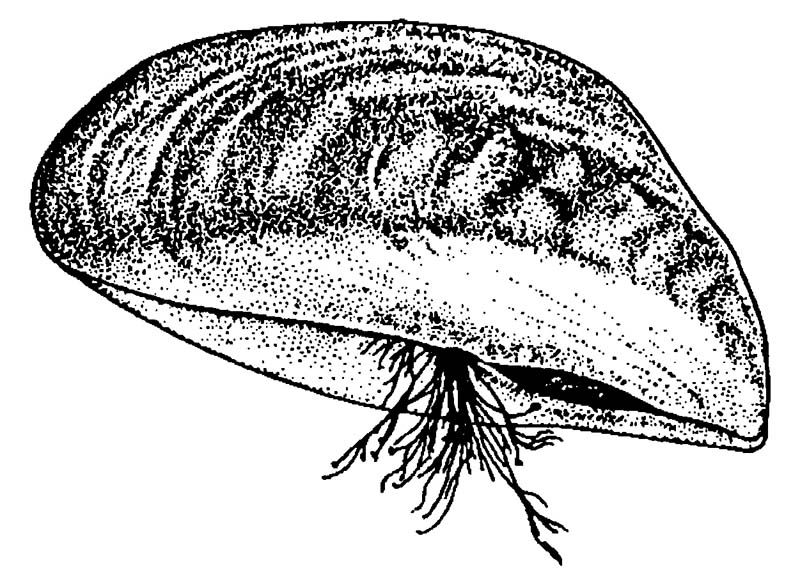
Byssus visible

Research on natural enemies, both in Europe and North America, has focused on predators, particularly birds (36 species) and fish (15 species that eat veligers and 38 that eat attached mussels). Annually, the wintering waterbirds at Lake Constance decrease zebra mussel biomass in shallow areas by >90%. Biomass reduction in deeper areas varies considerably based on substratum; Werner et al. observed no reduction at the lowest observed depth of 11 metres (36 ft) except for a site at Hagnau.

The vast majority of the organism's natural enemies are not present in North America. Ecologically similar species do exist, but they are unlikely to eliminate already established mussels and have a limited role in their control, unlike their counterparts in Europe.

It is pointed out that crayfish could have a significant impact on the densities of 1-to-5-millimetre (0.039 to 0.197 in)-long zebra mussels. An adult crayfish consumes around 105 zebra mussels every day, or about 6,000 mussels in a season. However, predation rates are significantly reduced at lower water temperatures. Additionally, certain fish, such as the smallmouth bass, are predators in the zebra mussels' adopted North American Great Lakes habitat, but in European lakes, fish do not seem to limit the densities of zebra mussels.

There have been some high winter mortalities, for example in the winter of 1994–1995 in the invasive population of Lake Simcoe. Evans et al., 2011 attributes this to predation by the crayfish Orconectes propinquus. Nonetheless this has not been sufficient to eradicate the problem.

=== Other control ===
On 4 June 2014, Canadian conservation authorities announced that a test using liquid fertilizer to kill invasive zebra mussels was successful. This test was conducted in a lakefront harbour in the western province of Manitoba. However, outbreaks continue in Lake Winnipeg.

Similar tests were run in Illinois, Minnesota, and Michigan, using zequanox, a biopesticide. Niclosamide proves effective in killing invasive zebra mussels in cool waters.

== As an invasive species ==
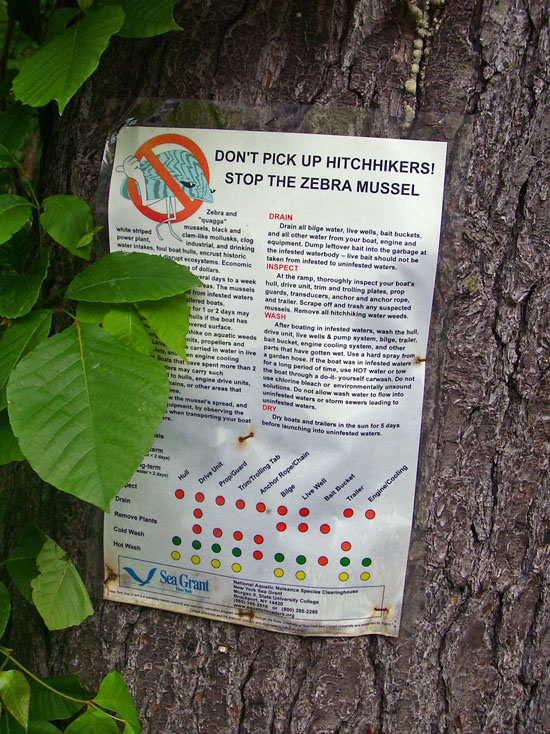
Sign advising boaters on how to prevent spread, Titicus Reservoir in North Salem, New York

=== Europe ===
The native distribution of the species is in the Black Sea and Caspian Sea in Eurasia. Zebra mussels have become an invasive species in North America, Great Britain, Ireland, Italy, Spain, and Sweden. They disrupt ecosystems through monotypic colonisation and damage harbours and waterways, ships and boats, and water-treatment and power plants. Water-treatment plants are most affected because the water intakes bring the microscopic, free-swimming larvae directly into the facilities. Zebra mussels also cling to pipes under the water and clog them.

Grossinger reported it in Hungary in 1794. Kerney and Morton described the rapid colonisation of Britain by the zebra mussel, first in Cambridgeshire in the 1820s, London in 1824, and in the Union Canal near Edinburgh in 1834.

In 1827, zebra mussels were seen in the Netherlands at Rotterdam. Canals that artificially link many European waterways facilitated their early dispersal. It is nonindigenous in the Czech Republic in the Elbe River in Bohemia since 1893; in southern Moravia, it is probably native. Around 1920 the mussels reached Lake Mälaren in Sweden.

The first appearance of the organism in northern Italy was in Lake Garda in 1973; in central Italy, they appeared in Tuscany in 2003.

Zebra mussels are present in British waterways. Many water companies are reporting problems with their water-treatment plants, with mussels attaching themselves to pipework. Anglian Water has estimated that it costs £500,000 per year to remove the mussels from their treatment plants. Zebra mussels arguably have also affected fishing, for example at Salford Quays, where their introduction has changed the environment for the fish.

Zebra mussels were first reported in Ireland in 1997, but probably arrived in 1994 or earlier. First identified near Lough Derg, they may have been introduced to Ireland through several vectors but have since spread through much of the River Shannon and its adjacent waters. In the summers of 2023 and 2024, zebra mussels were one contributing factor to a major bloom of toxic cyanobacteria in Lough Neagh, the largest body of freshwater in the United Kingdom. In 2021 the similar quagga mussel was identified in the Shannon, which is capable of tolerating a wider range of environmental conditions. The spread of quagga mussels is expected to reduce zebra mussel populations over time while increasing the overall environmental impact.

The mussels have displaced native species of molluscs in Lake Constance, reaching densities of up to 10,000 mussels per square metre (930/sq ft). The mussels present a food source to waterfowl and have caused bird numbers to double over the last 30 years. By the end of winter, birds decimate zebra mussel populations and reduce them by 95–99% up to the maximum depth reachable by birds of c. 10 metres (33 ft). The estimated quantity of consumed zebra mussels is 750 metric tons per square kilometre (2,100 short ton/sq mi). Zebra mussel populations recover annually, indicating that waterfowl may control infested bodies of water but not reverse the infestation status entirely. The presence of zebra mussels has also allowed the colonisation of the Swiss lakes by the normally strictly marine common eider, which typically feeds on marine mussels.

In Italy, zebra mussels were first recorded in the early 1970s in Lake Garda, in the north of the country. They then spread over tributaries and nearby basins, reaching the Apennine Mountains in the 1990s, namely Tuscany, Umbria, Abruzzo, Molise and Sicily. Zebra mussels are more likely to be found at low to medium elevations in the Italian regions where large streams have fluviatile deposits. Italy's north and centre seem to be more vulnerable. The majority of medium- to high-risk lake and river reaches are found in northern and central Italy.

=== North America ===
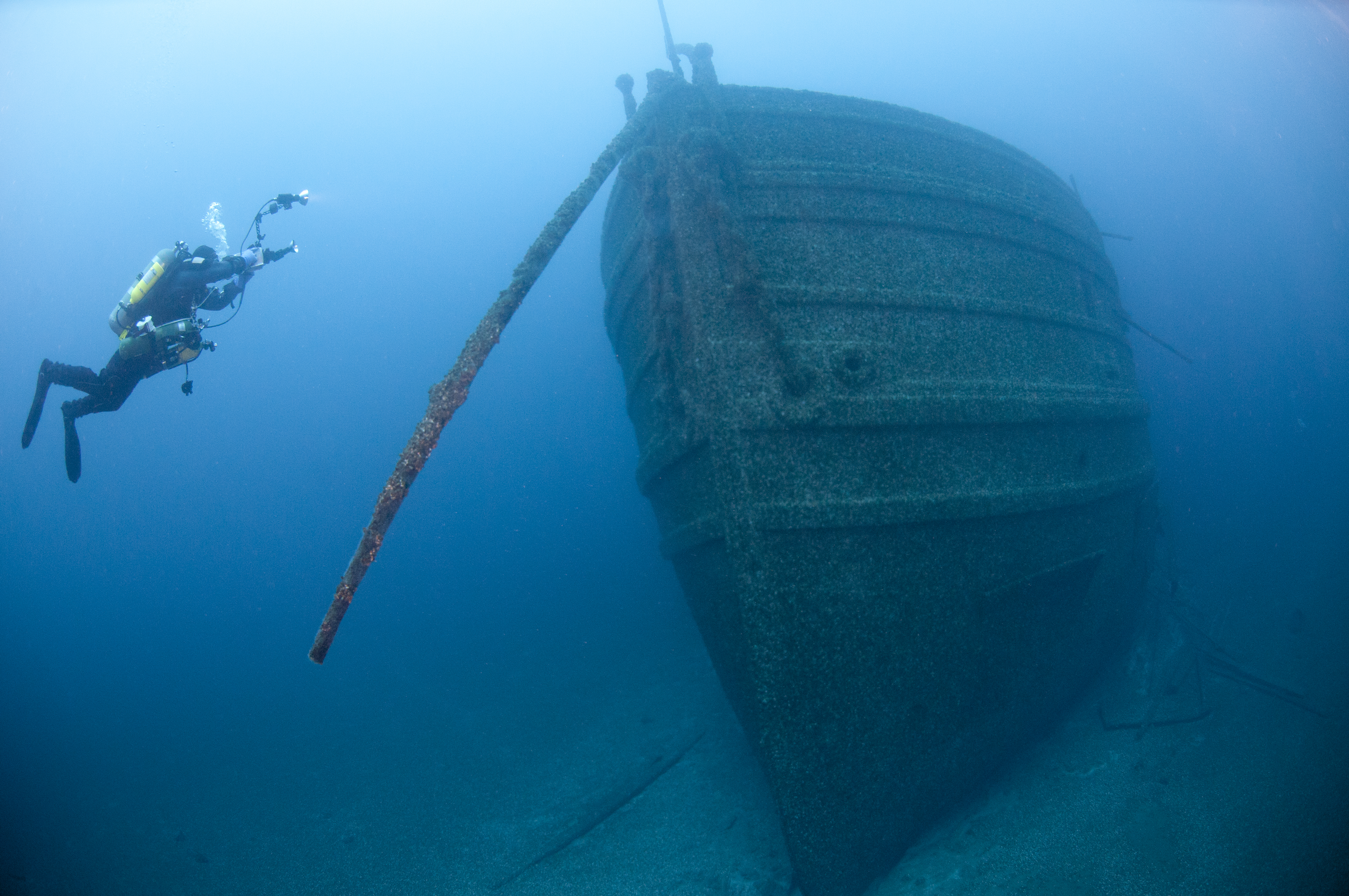
Zebra mussels can commonly be found on shipwrecks in the Great Lakes, one example, the wreck of the steamship Florida, can be found in Lake Huron.

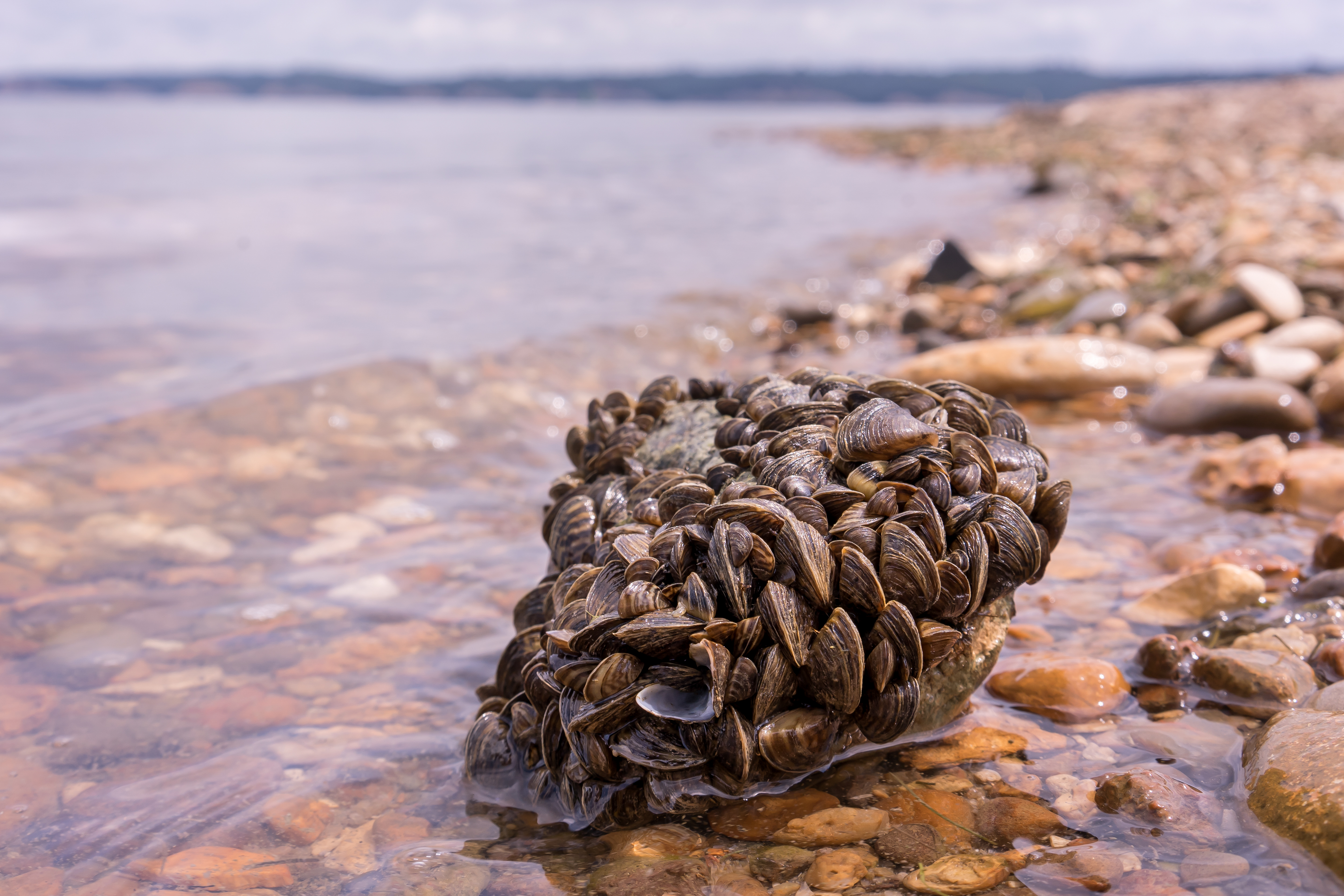
In South Dakota

They were first detected in Canada in the Great Lakes in 1988, in Lake St. Clair. They are thought to have been inadvertently introduced into the lakes by the ballast water of ocean-going ships that were traversing the St. Lawrence Seaway. Another possible but unproven mode of introduction is via anchors and chains. Since adult zebra mussels can survive out of water for several days or weeks if the temperature is low and humidity is high, chain lockers provide temporary refuge for clusters of adult mussels that could easily be released when transoceanic ships drop anchor in freshwater ports. They have become an invasive species in North America, and as such, they are the target of federal policy to control them, for instance, in the National Invasive Species Act (1996).

Using models based on the genetic algorithm for rule-set production (GARP), a group of researchers predicted that the Southeastern United States is moderately to highly likely to be inhabited by zebra mussels, and the Midwest is unlikely to experience a zebra mussel invasion of water bodies. This model has since been proven incorrect. In 2006, a researcher (also using GARP) predicted that invasion would extend as far west as the North Platte River by 2015. As of March 2016, zebra mussels have affected hundreds of lakes in the Midwest, including Lake Michigan, and the largest interior lake in Wisconsin, Lake Winnebago.

Congressional researchers have estimated that the zebra mussel has cost businesses and communities over $5 billion since their initial invasion. Zebra mussels have cost power companies alone over $3 billion.

On 2 March 2021, the US Geological Survey was notified that zebra mussels had been discovered in marimo moss balls, a common aquarium plant, sold in pet stores across North America. By 8 March, the invasive species had been detected in moss balls across 30 states at multiple retail locations in the United States. These discoveries were prompted by the initial find at a Petco in Seattle. Infested moss balls have also been found from online retailers and smaller, independent stores. Though it is more difficult to know the extent of the spread at a larger scale, Wesley Daniel, a fisheries biologist with the U.S. Geological Survey, says that about 30% of the inventory pulled from shelves was found to contain the zebra mussels.

After working with the USGS, PetSmart and Petco voluntarily recalled their moss balls due to the potential harm zebra mussels could cause to indigenous ecosystems.

==== By location ====
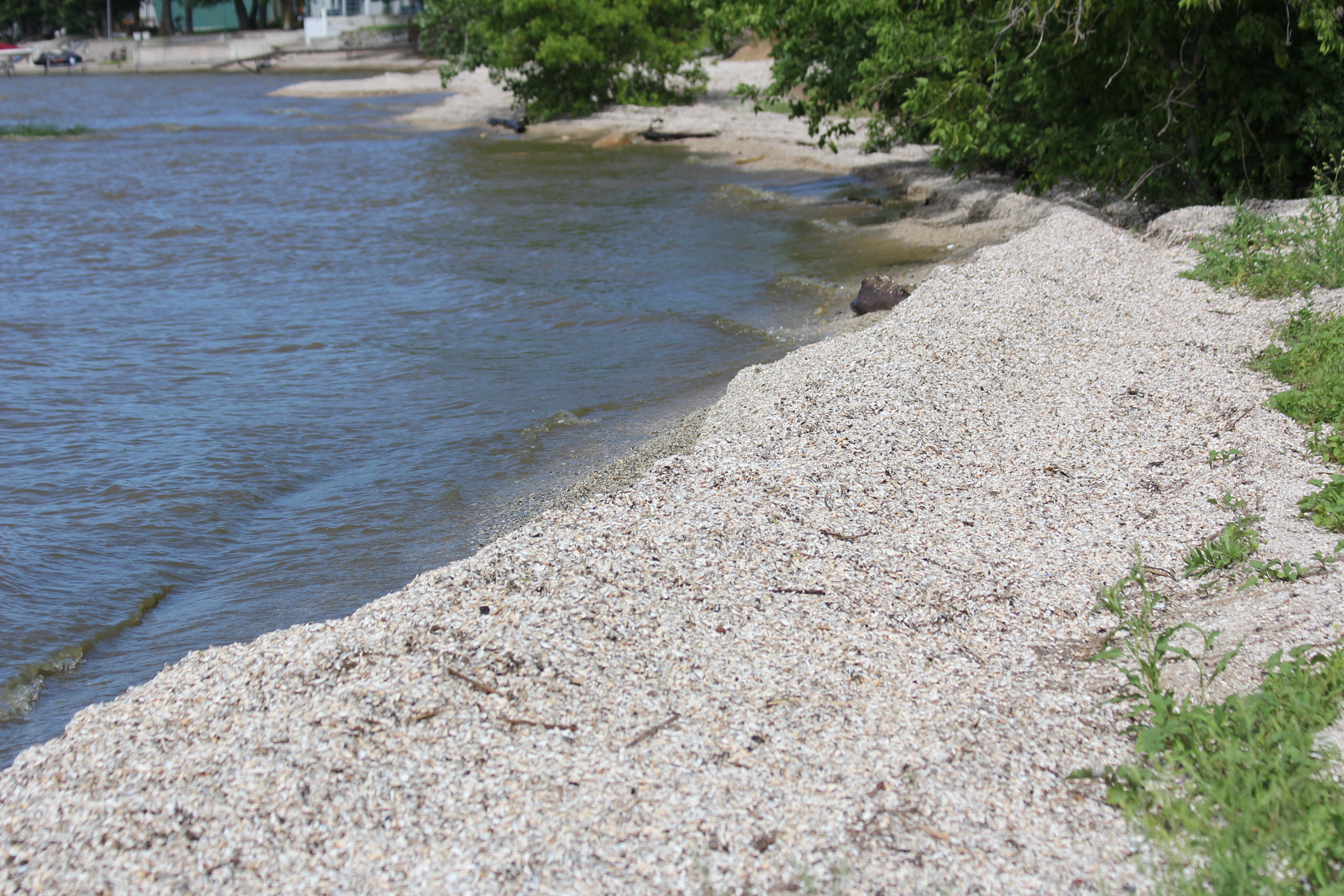
Along the shoreline of Lake Michigan

From their first appearance in North American waters in 1988, zebra mussels have spread to a large number of waterways, including Lake Simcoe in the Great Lakes region, the Mississippi, Hudson, St. Lawrence, Ohio, Cumberland, Missouri, Tennessee, Huron, Colorado, and Arkansas rivers, and, by mid-2023, 31 lakes and seven river basins in Texas. However, zebra mussels could not establish reproducing populations in Kentucky Lake (Tennessee River). This may be due to relatively low dissolved calcium levels in this water body.

In 2009, the Massachusetts Department of Conservation and Recreation confirmed that zebra mussels had been found in Laurel Lake in the Berkshires. That same year, the Minnesota Department of Natural Resources announced that live zebra mussels had been found in Pelican Lake. This was the first confirmed sighting in the Red River Basin, which extends across the international border into the province of Manitoba. In 2013, their presence in Manitoba's Lake Winnipeg was confirmed, and aggressive efforts to eradicate them in 2014 have not succeeded. New contamination was found outside treated areas of Lake Winnipeg in 2015, and it was also found in the Red River near the lake in Selkirk Park in 2015. Large numbers were seen at Grand Beach in 2017.

In July 2010, the North Dakota Game and Fish Department confirmed the presence of zebra mussel veliger in the Red River between Wahpeton, North Dakota, and Breckenridge, Minnesota. As recently as 2008, California similarly reported invasions.

In 2011, an invasion of zebra mussels shut down a water pipeline in the Dallas area. This resulted in reduced water supplies during a drought year, worsening water restrictions across the Dallas area.

A common inference made by scientists predicts that the zebra mussel will continue spreading passively, by ship and by pleasure craft, to more rivers in North America. Trailered boat traffic is the most likely vector for invasion into Western North America. This spread is preventable if boaters thoroughly clean and dry their boats and associated equipment before transporting them to new bodies of water. Since no North American predator or combination of predators has been shown to cause a long-term decline in zebra mussel numbers, such spread has been persistent and difficult to remedy.

A major decrease in the concentration of dissolved oxygen was observed in the Seneca River in central New York in the summer of 1993. This decrease was caused by extremely high concentrations of zebra mussels in the watershed. Additionally, the Seneca River had significantly less chlorophyll in the water, which is used as a measure of phytoplankton biomass, because of the presence of zebra mussels.

==== Cost ====
The cost of fighting the pests at power plants and other water-consuming facilities is substantial, but the magnitude of the damage is a matter of some controversy. According to the Center for Invasive Species Research at the University of California, Riverside, the cost of management of zebra mussels in the Great Lakes alone exceeds $500 million per year. A more conservative study estimated total economic costs of $267 million for electric-generation and water-treatment facilities in the entire United States from 1989 through 2004. In a study conducted by the US Department of State in 2009, the total cost of the zebra mussel invasion is estimated at 3.1 billion over the next 10 years.

Concerns are also high following the contamination of zebra mussels in at-home aquariums. If zebra mussels had reached open waters in Seattle, Washington, where the first case was confirmed, the invasive species would have cost the state $100 million per year in maintenance of power and water systems.

== Effects ==
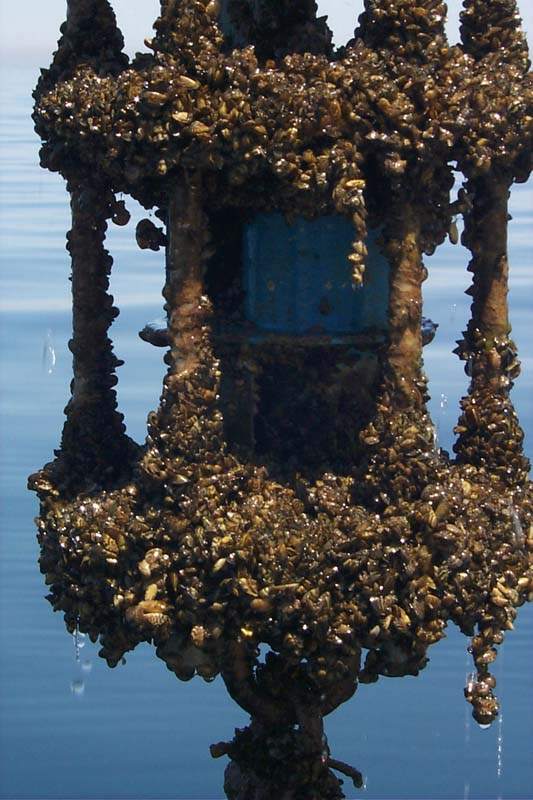
Current meter, Lake Michigan

As with most bivalves, zebra mussels are filter feeders. When in the water, they open their shells to admit detritus. Their shells are very sharp and are known for cutting people's feet, resulting in the need to wear water shoes wherever they are prevalent.

Since their colonisation of the Great Lakes, they have covered the undersides of docks, boats, and anchors. They have also spread into streams and rivers throughout the U.S. In some areas, they completely cover the substrate, sometimes covering other freshwater mussels. They can grow so densely that they block pipelines, clogging water intakes of municipal water supplies and hydroelectric companies. Zebra mussels do not attach to cupronickel alloys, which can be used to coat intake and discharge grates, navigational buoys, boats, and motors where the species tends to congregate.

Zebra mussels are believed to be the source of deadly avian botulism poisoning that has killed tens of thousands of birds in the Great Lakes since the late 1990s. They are edible, but since they are so efficient at filtering water, they tend to accumulate pollutants and toxins, so most experts recommend against consuming zebra mussels.

Zebra mussels affect all classes of algal species, resulting in a shortage of food sources to native species of freshwater mussels and fish in the Great Lakes.

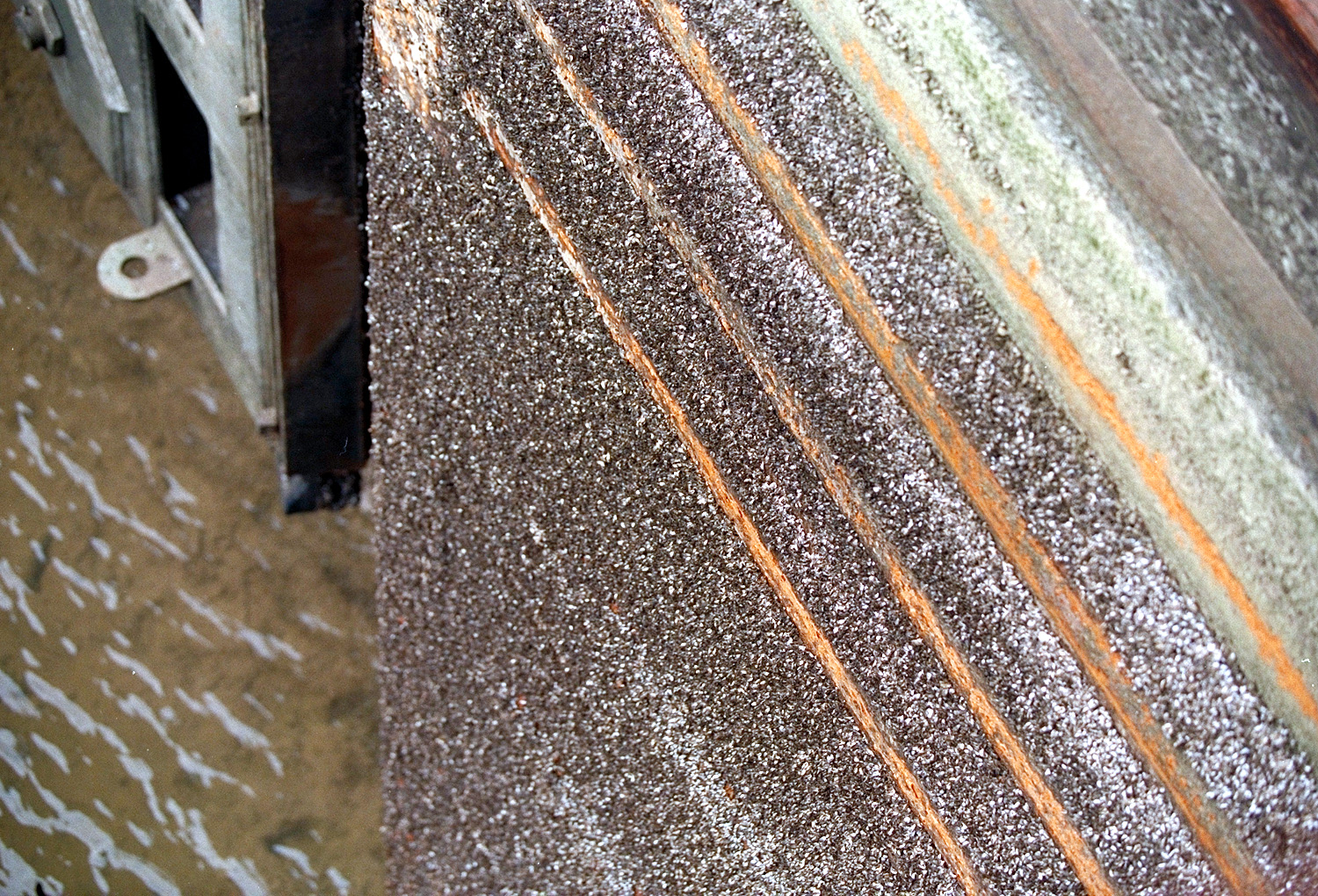
Arthur V. Ormond Lock on the Arkansas River

However, zebra mussels and other non-native species are credited with the increased population and size of smallmouth bass in Lake Erie and yellow perch in Lake St. Clair. They cleanse the waters of inland lakes, resulting in increased sunlight penetration and growth of native algae at greater depths. This cleansing also increases water visibility and filters out pollutants. Each quagga and zebra mussel filters about 1 litre (1 US quart) of water per day when confined to small tanks. In lakes, their filtering effects are usually spatially restricted (near the lake bottom) because of non-homogeneous water column mixing.

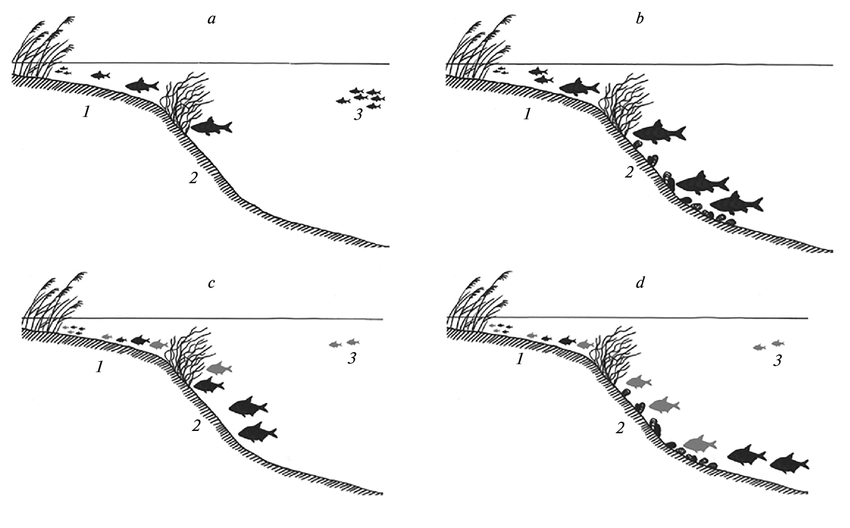
Changes in the spatial distribution of some fish species in the littoral (1), sublittoral (2) and pelagic (3) zones of Lake Pleshcheyevo before (a, c) and after (b, d) the introduction of zebra mussels: a - roach in 1978-1981, b - the same in 2014-2016, c - bream (black) and silver bream (grey) in 1978-1981, d - the same in 2014-2015.

In Lake Pleshcheyevo, Russia, zebra mussels have significantly altered the fish community. All fish species remained in the lake, but catches changed significantly. Gillnets set in the littoral and sublittoral zones during the feeding period consist mainly of large roach and perch, while vendace were prevalent in the pelagic zone. The abundance of benthophagous fishes increased slightly due to the presence of the zebra mussel, which made up a significant part of the diet, followed by an increase (p<0.05) in the growth rates of roach and silver bream. The growth rates of the bream, which prefer soft zoobenthos, decreased. In addition, the formation of a stable biocenosis of zebra mussels in the lake likely altered the spatial structure of the fish community. What is notable is the disappearance of small roach from pelagic assemblages, probably due to alterations in the trophic links of the littoral and sublittoral zones, as well as the expected increase in food competition among pelagic fish species.

Because zebra mussels damage water intakes and other infrastructure, methods such as adding oxidants, flocculants, heat, dewatering, mechanical removal, and pipe coatings are becoming increasingly common.

== Mitigation ==
Zebra mussels cling to boat motors. The Massachusetts state government recommends thorough inspection and cleaning of vessels and related equipment, as well as draining and cleaning any water-containing components.

The United States Fish and Wildlife Service has urged aquatic hobbyists to decontaminate any marimo moss balls balls to avoid further spread, and the USGS has called for bagging any moss balls prior to disposal, to prevent them from reaching waterways.

It is illegal to own, sell, or distribute zebra mussels in the U.S. Recent research shows that zebra mussels could not establish reproducing populations in Kentucky Lake, indicating that the physico-chemical characteristics of this lake deter the species. A better understanding of the lake's characteristics and identification of the key parameters that deter zebra mussels may pave the way for protecting other aquatic ecosystems from the spreading of this invasive species.

== See also ==
- Silver carp
- Hydrilla
