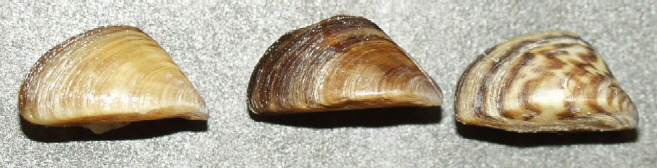
- Dreissena polymorpha

Scientific classification
- Domain: Eukaryota
- Kingdom: Animalia
- Phylum: Mollusca
- Class: Bivalvia
- Superorder: Imparidentia
- Order: Myida
- Superfamily: Dreissenoidea; Gray, 1840

Families
- Dreissenidae

= Dreissenoidea =

Superfamily of bivalves

Dreissenoidea is a superfamily of brackish water and freshwater false mussels, aquatic bivalve molluscs in the order Myida.

== Families ==
Families within the superfamily Dreisseniodea include:

- Dreissenidae
