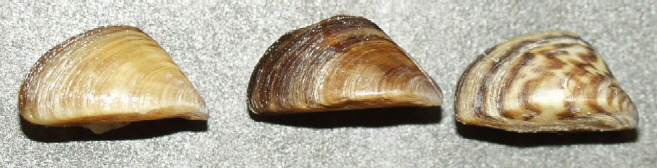
- Three shells of Dreissena polymorpha without the byssus, showing the range of color and markings

Scientific classification
- Domain: Eukaryota
- Kingdom: Animalia
- Phylum: Mollusca
- Class: Bivalvia
- Order: Myida
- Superfamily: Dreissenoidea
- Family: Dreissenidae; Gray, 1840

Genera
- Dreissena; Mytilopsis; Congeria; Rheodreissena

= Dreissenidae =

Family of bivalves

The Dreissenidae are a family of small freshwater aquatic bivalve molluscs, commonly called mussels although not at all closely related to true mussels. The shells of these bivalves are shaped somewhat like those of true mussels, which they also resemble in attaching themselves to a hard substrate such as stone using a byssus; however, this group is more closely related to the venus clams (Veneridae).

== Genera ==
Genera within the family Dreissenidae include:

- Congeria, a unique genus of cave-dwelling bivalves
- Dreissena, the type genus of the family
- Mytilopsis
- Rheodreissena, a South American genus described in 2018

== Shell morphology ==
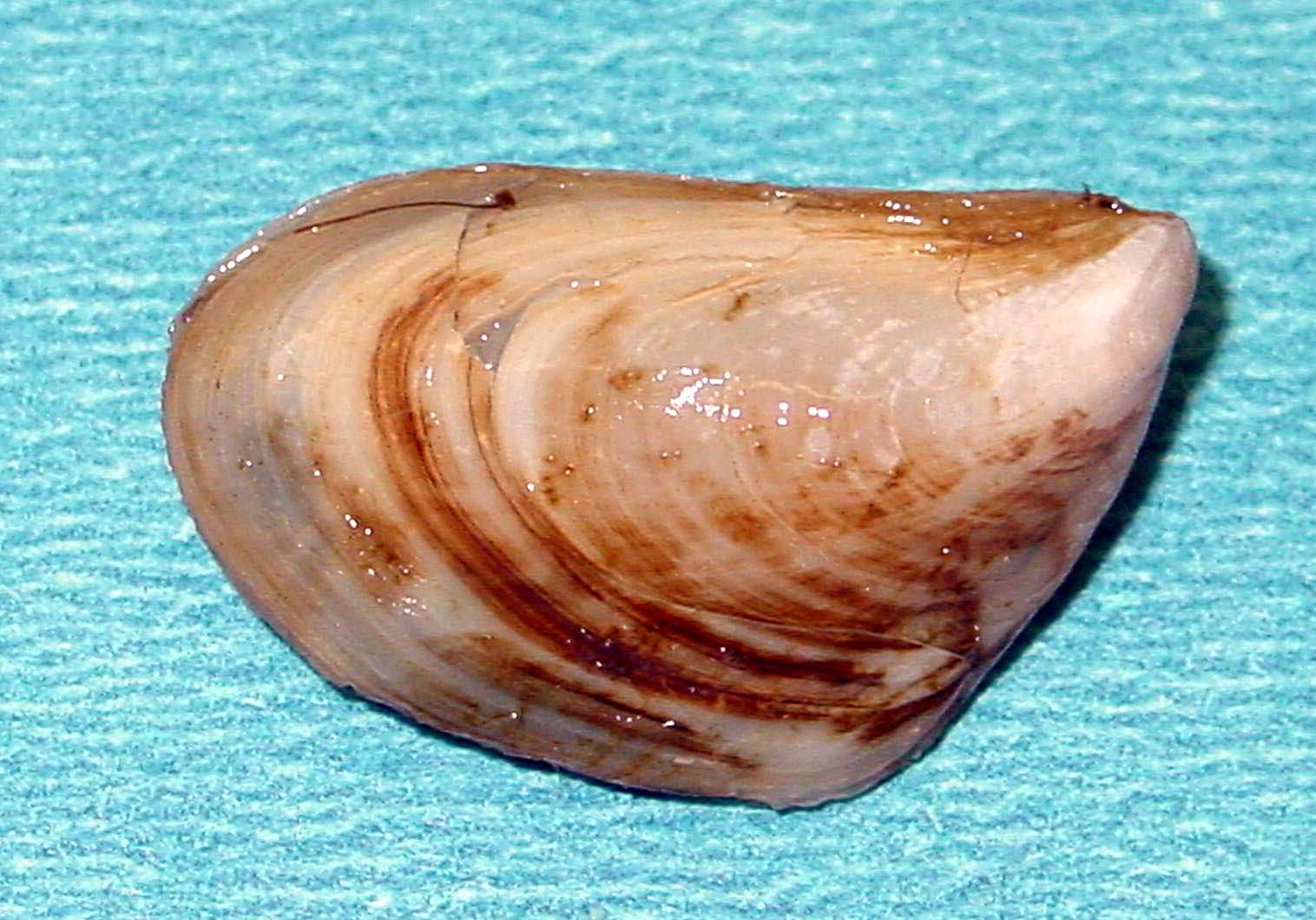
The quagga mussel, Dreissena bugensis

The shells of species of mussels in this family range from 20 to 40 mm in their maximum dimension, and about half as wide across. The shell outline is bent, with one margin usually somewhat incurved, and the other strongly curved outwardly. The shell is opaque and robust; in coloration it is yellowish, brownish or greyish, often with light-and-dark stripes.

== Biology and ecology ==
These mussels breathe via complex gills. They live in clean, well oxygenated, lowland rivers, canals and reservoirs, attaching to stones and other hard surfaces; they will also tolerate slightly brackish water.

== Geographical range of distribution ==
In Britain there is only one species from this family, Dreissena polymorpha, the zebra mussel, which is a troublesome invasive species. In the US, both D. polymorpha and D. bugensis are problematic introduced species.
