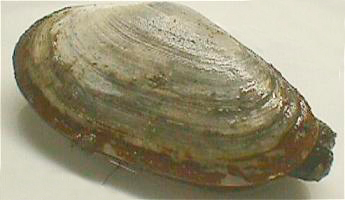
- A live individual of the soft-shelled clam, Mya arenaria

Scientific classification
- Domain: Eukaryota
- Kingdom: Animalia
- Phylum: Mollusca
- Class: Bivalvia
- Infraclass: Heteroconchia
- Subterclass: Euheterodonta
- Superorder: Imparidentia
- Order: Myida; Stoliczka, 1870

Superfamilies and families
- See text

Synonyms
- Myoida

= Myida =

Order of bivalves

Myida (formerly Myoida) is an order of saltwater and freshwater clams, marine and freshwater bivalve molluscs in the subclass Heterodonta. The order includes such bivalves as soft-shell clams, geoducks and shipworms.

== Description ==
They are burrowing molluscs with well-developed siphons. The shell is relatively soft and lacks a nacreous layer. Some species have a single cardinal tooth.

== Superfamilies and families ==
Superfamilies and families within the Myida include (the use of † indicate taxa that are extinct):

- Superfamily: Dreissenoidea
  - Family: Dreissenidae
- Superfamily: Myoidea
  - Family: Corbulidae
  - Family: Myidae
  - Family: †Pleurodesmatidae
  - Family: †Raetomyidae
- Superfamily: Pholadoidea
  - Family: Pholadidae
  - Family: Teredinidae
  - Family: Xylophagaidae
- Superfamily: †Pleuromyoidea
  - Family: †Ceratomyidae
  - Family: †Pleuromyidae
  - Family: †Vacunellidae
