= Siliquaria =

Scientific classification
- Kingdom: Animalia
- Phylum: Mollusca
- Class: Gastropoda
- Subclass: Caenogastropoda
- Order: incertae sedis
- Family: Siliquariidae
- Genus: Siliquaria; Bruguière, 1789

Type species
- Serpula anguina Linnaeus, 1758

Species
- See text

Genus of gastropods

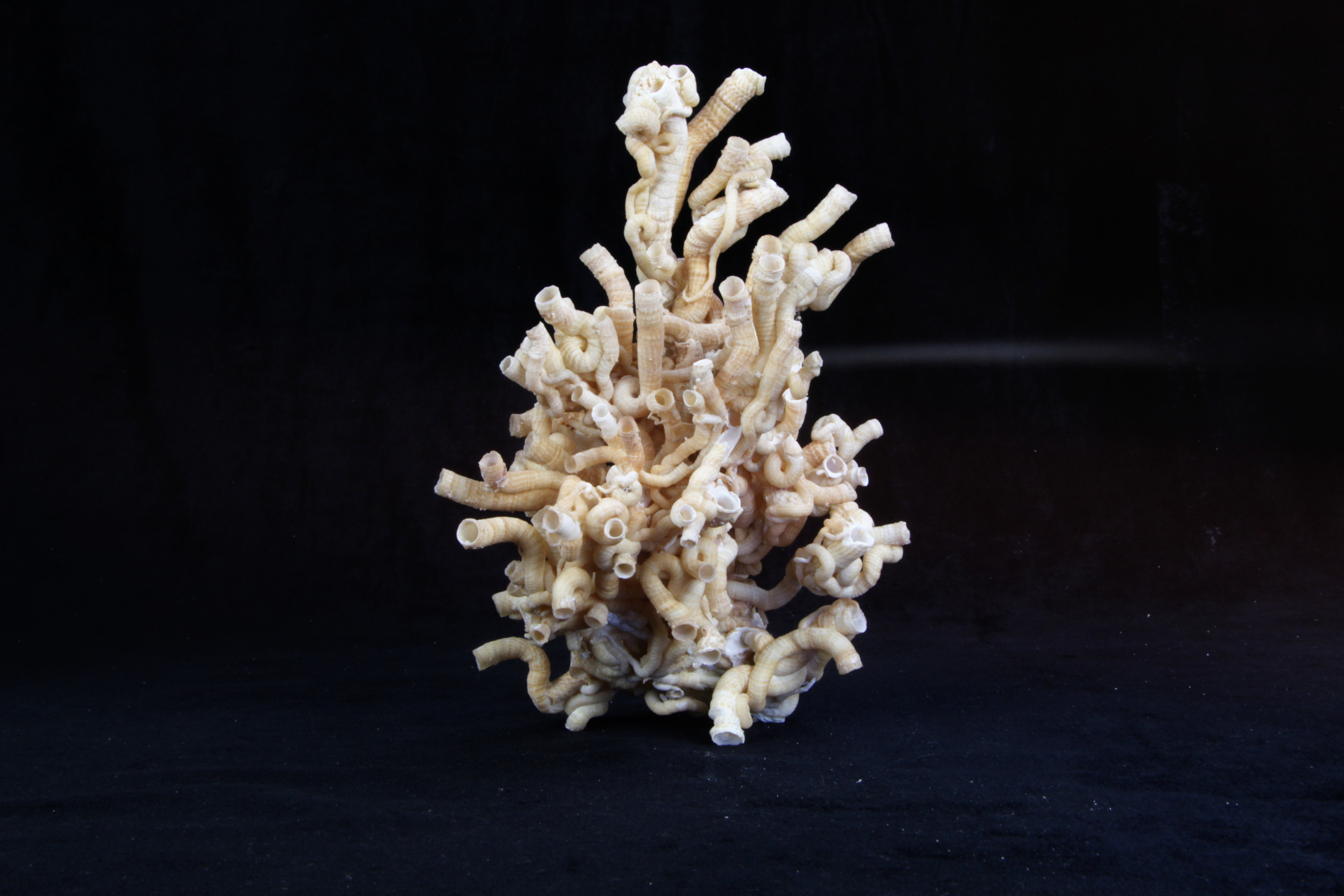
Siliquaria

Siliquaria, common name the slit worm snails, is a genus of sea snails, marine gastropod molluscs in the family Siliquariidae.

Siliquaria is the type genus of the family Siliquariidae.

Siliquaria is considered to be an objective synonym of Tenagodus Guettard, 1770 in World Register of Marine Species.

== Species ==
Species in the genus Siliquaria include:

- Siliquaria muricata Born, 1780
- Siliquaria norai Bozzetti, 1998

The Indo-Pacific Molluscan Database also mentions the following species with names in current use;

- Siliquaria bernardi Mörch, 1860
- Siliquaria chuni (Thiele, 1925)
- Siliquaria gigas Lesson, 1830
- Siliquaria reentzii (Mörch, 1865)
- Siliquaria scalariformis Mörch, 1861

Subgenus Siliquaria

- Siliquaria australis Quoy & Gaimard, 1834
- Siliquaria encausticus (Mörch, 1861)
- Siliquaria tostus (Mörch, 1861)

Synonymized species

- Siliquaria anguina (Linnaeus, 1758): synonym of Tenagodus anguinus (Linnaeus, 1758)
- Siliquaria armata Kuroda, Habe & Kosuge, 1971: synonym of Tenagodus armatus (Habe & Kosuge, 1967)
- Siliquaria bipartita Martin, 1880: synonym of Kuphus polythalamia (Linnaeus, 1758)
- Siliquaria cumingii Mörch, 1861: synonym of Tenagodus cumingii (Mörch, 1861)
- Siliquaria lactea Lamarck, 1818: synonym of Tenagodes lacteus Lamarck, 1818
- Siliquaria limonensis Olsson, 1922: synonym of Tenagodus modestus (Dall, 1881)
- Siliquaria maoria Powell, 1940: synonym of Tenagodus maoria (Powell, 1940)
- Siliquaria modesta Dall, 1881: synonym of Tenagodus modestus (Dall, 1881)
- Siliquaria norai Bozzetti, 1998: synonym of Tenagodus norai (Bozzetti, 1998)
- Siliquaria ponderosa Mörch, 1861: synonym of Tenagodus ponderosus (Mörch, 1861)
- Siliquaria sculpturata Gabb, 1881: synonym of Tenagodus squamatus (Blainville, 1827)
- Siliquaria senegalensis (Mörch, 1860): synonym of Tenagodus senegalensis (Récluz in Mörch, 1860)
- Siliquaria squamata Blainville, 1827: synonym of Tenagodus squamatus (Blainville, 1827)
- Siliquaria tahitensis (Mörch, 1861): synonym of Tenagodus tahitensis Mörch, 1861
- Siliquaria trochlearis (Mörch, 1860): synonym of Tenagodes trochlearis (Mörch, 1861)
- Siliquaria weldii Tenison Woods, 1876: synonym of Tenagodus weldii Tenison-Woods, 1876

== See also ==
- Tenagodus
