= Thiosocius =

Scientific classification
- Domain: Bacteria
- Kingdom: Pseudomonadati
- Phylum: Pseudomonadota
- Class: Gammaproteobacteria
- Order: incertae sedis
- Family: incertae sedis
- Genus: Thiosocius; Altamia et al., 2019
- Species: T. teredinicola

Binomial name
- Thiosocius teredinicola Altamia et al., 2019

Genus of bacteria

Thiosocius is a genus of bacteria that lives in symbiosis with the giant shipworm Kuphus polythalamius. It contains a single species, Thiosocius teredinicola, which was isolated from the gills of the shipworm. The specific name derives from the Latin terms teredo (shipworm) and incola (dweller).

== Ecology ==
The host K. polythalamius can be found in the Philippines. Its habitat is woody organic-rich marine sediment. The giant shipworm has a symbiotic relationship with T. teredinicola which in exchange for housing can oxidize inorganic sulfur compounds to generate energy that is used to fix inorganic carbon and nitrogen into food for the shipworm host.

== Sampling / culture ==
Thiosocius teredinicola strains were isolated from the gills of two giant shipworms specimen (K. polythalamius) then grown on liquid medium culture. These strains were able to grow chemolithoautotrophically and heterotrophically. During chemolithoautotrophic growth, the cells used hydrogen sulfide, thiosulfate, tetrathionate or elemental sulfur as the energy source and bicarbonate as the carbon source. The cells showed diazotrophic capabilities during chemolithoautotrophic growth without a source of nitrogen. The cells also grew heterotrophically with organic acids such as acetate, propionate, pyruvate, malate, succinate, fumarate, glycerol, ethanol, D-fructose, glutamine, and glutamate. Cell growth was observed at 30°C - 37 °C (Optimum at 34 °C), pH range of 5.5 - 8.5 (Optimum: 8.5) and salinity range of 0.0-0.7 (Optimum: 0.2).

Thiosocius teredinicola was the first pure culture of a thioautotrophic animal symbiont.

== Phenotypic characteristics ==
The cells are gram-negative, and rod shaped with an average length of 1.7 μm and width of 0.5 μm. The cells are motile via single polar flagellum. The cells have carboxysomes and sulfur globules which turn carbon dioxide into sugar and store sulfur, respectively.

== Genetic characteristics ==
All T. teredinicola strain cultures that were isolated showed nearly identical 16S rRNA gene sequences (>99.8%). The 16S rRNA strain places T. teredinicola with other uncultivated Gammaproteobacteria from marine sediments. The full genome for T. teredinicola strain 2141T was sequenced showing 4,790, 451 bp. The full genome was analyzed showing variety of capabilities that were present in culture. The genes that give the capability to oxidize a variety of reduced sulfur and fix carbon dioxide autotrophically (RuBisCO) was present. The ni𝑓 gene that gives the ability to fix atmospheric nitrogen was present. The complete TCA cycle and glyoxylate bypass pathway that is required for heterotrophic growth was present. The G/C content was 60.1 mol%.
