= Teredo portoricensis =

Scientific classification
- Kingdom: Animalia
- Phylum: Mollusca
- Class: Bivalvia
- Order: Myida
- Superfamily: Pholadoidea
- Family: Teredinidae
- Genus: Teredo
- Species: T. portoricensis

Binomial name
- Teredo portoricensis W. Clapp, 1924

Species of bivalve

Teredo portoricensis, known commonly as the Puerto Rico shipworm, is a species of wood-boring clam or shipworm, a marine bivalve mollusk in the family Teredinidae.

== See also ==
- Fauna of Puerto Rico
