= Teredo somersi =

Scientific classification
- Kingdom: Animalia
- Phylum: Mollusca
- Class: Bivalvia
- Order: Myida
- Family: Teredinidae
- Genus: Teredo
- Species: T. somersi

Binomial name
- Teredo somersi Clapp, 1924

Synonyms
- Teredo radicis Moll, 1937

Species of mollusc

Teredo somersi is a species of mollusc primarily reported from the Western Atlantic, including the Caribbean, Gulf of Mexico, and Bermuda, where it was first described. It can also be found in similar warm-water environments globally, either natively or introduced via wooden ships.

== Characteristics ==
Teredo somersi has a long, worm-like body with small, ridged shells at the front used for boring into wood.

== Habitat ==
Teredo somersi is found in warm, marine environments—often in tropical and subtropical waters. Like all shipworms, it ingests wood as it tunnels, aided by symbiotic bacteria in its gills that help digest cellulose.
