= Kuphus =

Kuphus Temporal range: 25–0 Ma Oligocene to Present

Scientific classification
- Kingdom: Animalia
- Phylum: Mollusca
- Class: Bivalvia
- Order: Myida
- Superfamily: Pholadoidea
- Family: Teredinidae
- Genus: Kuphus; Guettard, 1770

Species
- Kuphus polythalamius; †Kuphus arenarius; †Kuphus incrassatus; †Kuphus fistula; †Kuphus melitensis

Genus of bivalves

Kuphus is a genus of shipworms, marine bivalve molluscs in the family Teredinidae. While there are four extinct species in the genus, the only extant species is Kuphus polythalamius (also incorrectly spelled as Kuphus polythalamia). It is the longest bivalve mollusc in the world, where the only known permanent natural habitat is Kalamansig, Sultan Kudarat in the Philippines.

Members of this genus secrete calcareous tubes. Based only on the calcareous tube, this species was originally thought by Linnaeus to be a tube worm, so he placed it in the genus Serpula. Despite the fact that Kuphus polythalamius is now known to be a mollusc, its common name is the giant tube worm. Since 1981 however, the name "giant tube worm" has also been applied to the hydrothermal vent species Riftia pachyptila, which is indeed a worm, an annelid.

== Species ==
The sole living species is:

- Kuphus polythalamius

Extinct species are:

- †Kuphus arenarius
- †Kuphus incrassatus
- †Kuphus fistula
- †Kuphus melitensis

== Taxonomy ==
Large, tusk-shaped, calcareous tubes were occasionally washed up on beaches. There was disagreement among zoologists in the 18th century as to whether the creature which made one of these was a polychaete tube-worm or came from a mollusc. Linnaeus described the species in 1758. He considered that it was a serpulid worm and named it Serpula arenaria, a name which in 1767 he changed to Serpula polythalamia. There was some confusion as to precisely which taxon he was describing, but S. polythalamius became the type species of the genus Serpula, a genus of polychaete worms. In 1770, Guettard introduced the name Kuphus for the genus, realising that the animal was not a worm but a mollusc. This meant that, according to the ICZN rules, the specific name became Kuphus polythalamius (Linnaeus, 1758).

== Fossil record ==
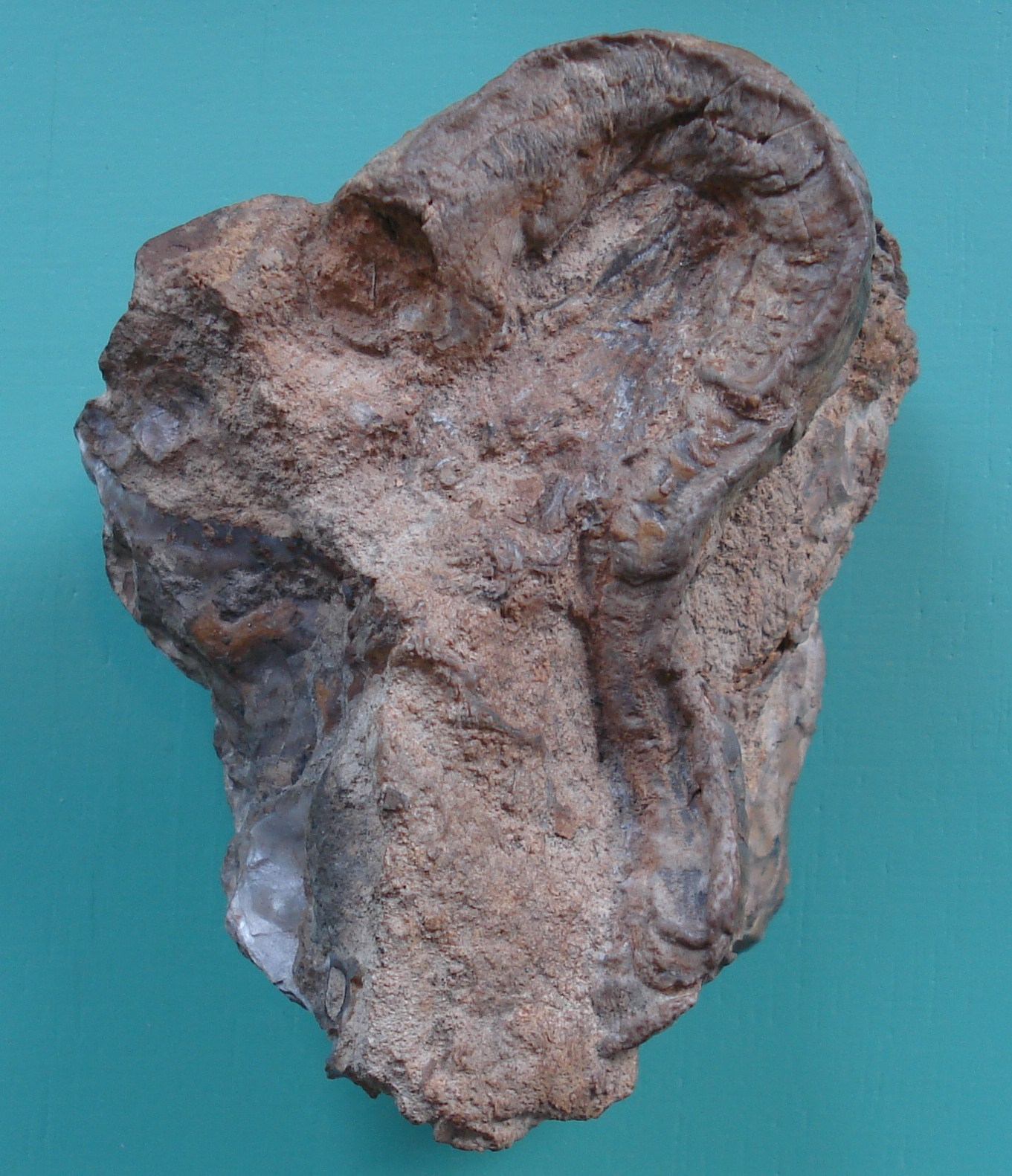
Fossil "worm" tube, possibly Kuphus sp.

Fossils of Kuphus polythalamius have been found dating back to the Oligocene. They came from rocks in various tropical and sub-tropical areas including Indonesia, Pakistan, Jamaica, Grenada, South Africa and Somalia.

Fossils of the extinct species, Kuphus melitensis, are found in Late Oligocene-aged coralline limestone of Malta.

Fossils of the extinct species, Kuphus incrassatus, have been found in rocks in Jamaica, Mexico, Panama, Puerto Rico, Trinidad and Tobago, Florida and Mississippi. Another species is Kuphus arenarius that have been recorded in Oligocene to Miocene-aged limestone layers of Asmari Formation in Iran. They are common in sedimentary Tertiary rocks in the Caribbean region. They date back to the Oligocene and Miocene and have been used for absolute dating of the rocks, using the relative proportions of two strontium isotopes in the fossils.

Fossils of the extinct species, Kuphus fistula, dating from the Miocene and Pliocene, have been found in various locations in Virginia in the United States.

=== Misidentification as dinosaur remains ===
Fossils found near Warsaw by paleontologist, Friedrich von Huene in 1941 were misidentified as being the teeth and parts of the jaw of a new species of dinosaur, which he named Succinodon putzeri. It was later determined that these were in fact the fossil remains of a marine boring bivalve, a previously undescribed species of Kuphus.

== Distribution ==
Today, Kuphus polythalamius is found in the western Pacific Ocean, the western and eastern Indian Ocean and the Indo-Malaysian area. The range includes the Philippines, Indonesia and Mozambique. However, the only thoroughly studied natural habitat of the species is in Kalamansig, Sultan Kudarat in the Philippines.
