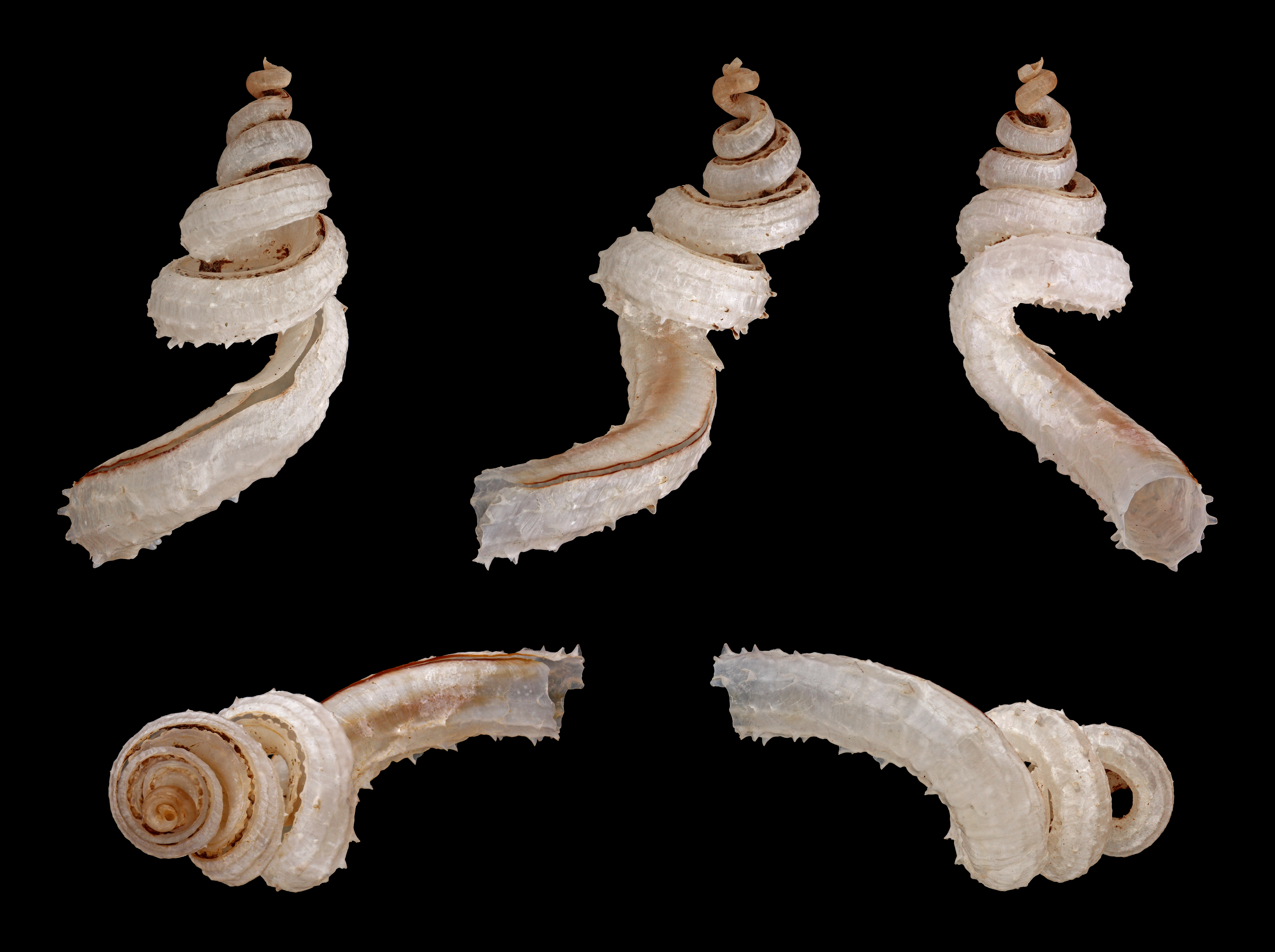
- Five view of a shell of Tenagodus anguinus

Scientific classification
- Kingdom: Animalia
- Phylum: Mollusca
- Class: Gastropoda
- Subclass: Caenogastropoda
- Order: incertae sedis
- Family: Siliquariidae
- Genus: Tenagodus; Guettard, 1770

Type species
- Serpula anguina Linnaeus, 1758

Synonyms
- Agathirses Montfort, 1808 †; Anguinaria Schumacher, 1817; Pyxipoma Mörch, 1861; Siliquaria Bruguière, 1789; Tenagodes Fischer, 1885

= Tenagodus =

Genus of gastropods

Tenagodus is a genus of sea snails, marine gastropod mollusks in the family Siliquariidae.

== Species ==
Species within the genus Tenagodus include:

- Tenagodus anguinus (Linnaeus, 1758)
- Tenagodus armatus (Habe & Kosuge, 1967)
- Tenagodus barbadensis Bieler, 2004
- Tenagodus chuni (Thiele, 1925)
- Tenagodus cumingii (Mörch, 1861)
- Tenagodus lacteus Lamarck, 1818
- Tenagodus maoria (Powell, 1940)
- Tenagodus modestus (Dall, 1881)
- Tenagodus norai (Bozzetti, 1998)
- Tenagodus obtusiformis Martin, 1905
- Tenagodus obtusus (Schumacher, 1817)
- Tenagodus ponderosus (Mörch, 1861)
- Tenagodus senegalensis (Récluz in Mörch, 1860)
- Tenagodus squamatus (Blainville, 1827)
- Tenagodus sundaensis Dharma, 2011
- Tenagodus tahitensis Mörch, 1861
- Tenagodus trochlearis Mörch, 1861
- Tenagodus weldii Tenison-Woods, 1876
- Tenagodus wilmanae (Tomlin, 1918)

Species brought into synonymy

- Tenagodus anguillae Mörch, 1861: synonym of Tenagodus squamatus (Blainville, 1827)
