= Petalopoma elisabettae =

Scientific classification
- Kingdom: Animalia
- Phylum: Mollusca
- Class: Gastropoda
- Subclass: Caenogastropoda
- Order: incertae sedis
- Family: Siliquariidae
- Genus: Petalopoma
- Species: P. elisabettae

Binomial name
- Petalopoma elisabettae Schiaparelli, 2002

Species of gastropod

Petalopoma elisabettae is a species of sea snail, a marine gastropod mollusk in the family Siliquariidae.
