= Siliquaria muricata =

Scientific classification
- Kingdom: Animalia
- Phylum: Mollusca
- Class: Gastropoda
- Subclass: Caenogastropoda
- Order: incertae sedis
- Family: Siliquariidae
- Genus: Siliquaria
- Species: S. muricata

Binomial name
- Siliquaria muricata Born, 1780

Synonyms
- Tenagodes muricatus Lamarck

Species of gastropod

Siliquaria muricata is a species of sea snail, a marine gastropod mollusk in the family Siliquariidae.

== Distribution ==
This species occurs in the Indian Ocean off Madagascar.
