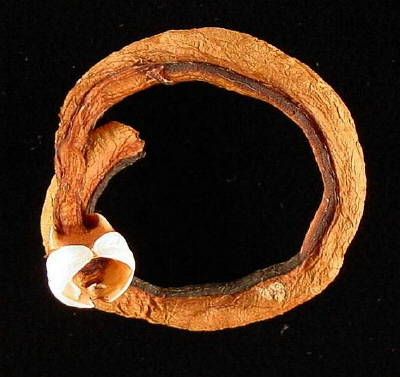
- This dried specimen of Teredo navalis was extracted from the wood and the calcareous tunnel that originally surrounded it and curled into a circle artificially. The two valves of the shell are the white structures at the anterior end; they are used to dig the tunnel in the wood.

Scientific classification
- Kingdom: Animalia
- Phylum: Mollusca
- Class: Bivalvia
- Order: Myida
- Superfamily: Pholadoidea
- Family: Teredinidae
- Genus: Teredo; Linnaeus, 1758

Type species
- Teredo navalis Linnaeus, 1758

Species
- See text.

Synonyms
- Austroteredo Habe, 1952; Coeloteredo; Pingoteredo Barsch, 1932; Teredo (Bitubuloteredo) Li, 1965; Teredo (Coeloteredo) Bartsch, 1923; Teredo (Zopoteredo) Bartsch, 1923; Zopoteredo

= Teredo (bivalve) =

Genus of molluscs

Teredo is a genus of highly modified saltwater clams which bore in wood and live within the tunnels they create. They are commonly known as "shipworms;" however, they are not worms, but marine bivalve molluscs (phylum Mollusca) in the taxonomic family Teredinidae. The type species is Teredo navalis.

The tunneling habit of species in the genus inspired the name of the Teredo network tunneling protocol. The submarine HMS Teredo may also have been named after this genus, which works invisibly, below the surface, and can be very damaging to marine installations made of wood.

== Diet ==
Like most marine based bivalves, teredo worms are primarily filter feeders and consume mostly seston, and not wood. Wood supplements their primary diet and is consumed with the assistance of bacteria inside their [gill] cells. However, wood is not a necessary part of their diet and they can live on the surface both of wooden and non-wooden structures.

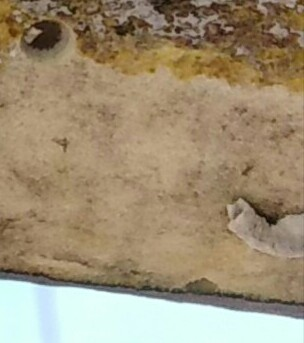
This photo demonstrates teredo worms do not require wood to survive and can damage non-wooden structures. This photo is of an epoxy-fiber glass vessel. Hole depths were less than 10mm. Remnants of a casing on the surface of the hull appear bottom right.

== Species ==
Species within the genus Teredo include:

- Teredo aegypos Moll, 1941
- Teredo bartschi Clapp, 1923
- Teredo bitubula Li, 1965
- Teredo clappi Bartsch, 1923
- Teredo fulleri Clapp, 1924
- Teredo furcifera Martens in Semon, 1894
- Teredo johnsoni Clapp, 1924
- Teredo mindanensis Bartsch, 1923
- Teredo navalis Linnaeus, 1758
- Teredo poculifer Iredale, 1936
- Teredo portoricensis Clapp, 1924
- Teredo somersi Clapp, 1924
- Teredo triangularis Edmondson, 1942

== Gallery ==
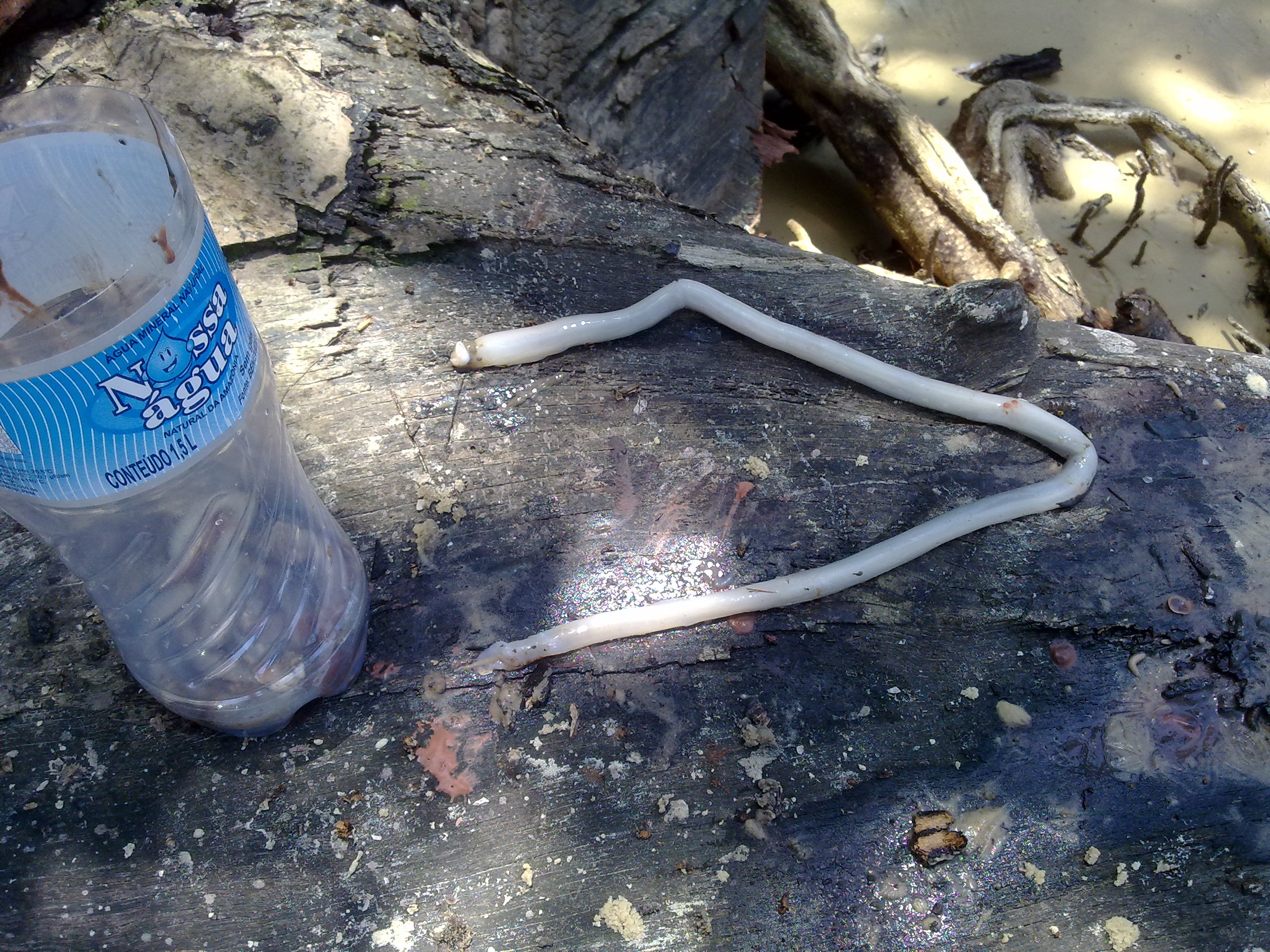
Teredo or Turu extracted from mangrove wood near Joanes, Marajó island, Brazil. This Turu is 1.5 cm in diameter and approximately 50 cm long (note that the tail is broken off).

== See also ==
- Teredora princesae
