= Teredo furcifera =

Scientific classification
- Kingdom: Animalia
- Phylum: Mollusca
- Class: Bivalvia
- Order: Myida
- Family: Teredinidae
- Genus: Teredo
- Species: T. furcifera

Binomial name
- Teredo furcifera E. von Martens, 1894

Species of mollusk

Teredo furcifera is a species of saltwater clam. Originally described from Indonesia in 1894, Teredo furcifera has been collected in tropical regions around the world. Introduced specimens have been collected on the East and West Coasts of North America.

== Morphology ==
Like other shipworms, T. furcifera has a long, soft body adapted for burrowing into wood. It uses small, calcareous shell valves at the anterior end to rasp and bore into the wood. The species also has specialized structures called pallets at the posterior end, which block the burrow entrance when the animal retracts inside.
