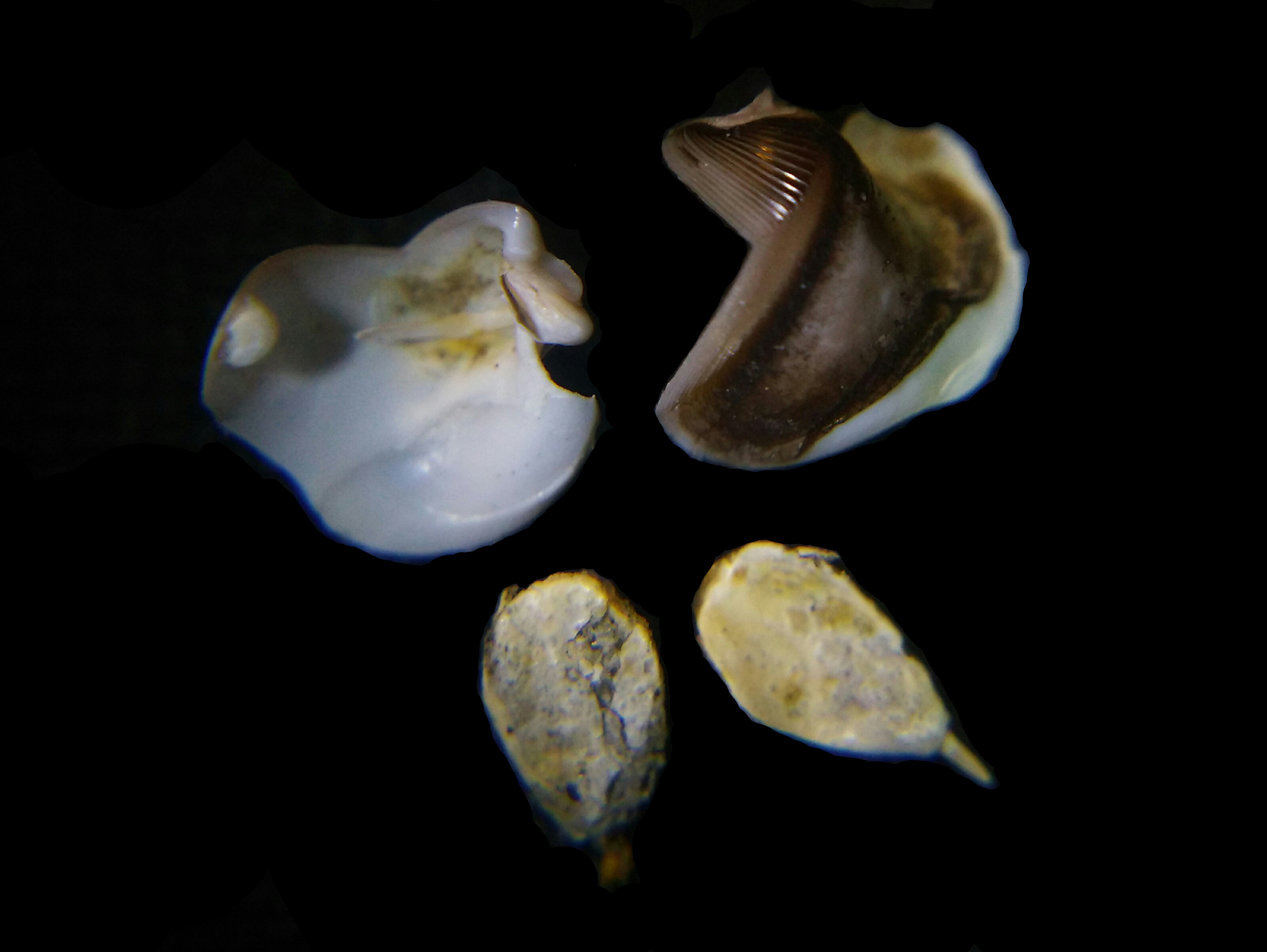
- Shell and pallets of Psiloteredo megotara

Scientific classification
- Kingdom: Animalia
- Phylum: Mollusca
- Class: Bivalvia
- Order: Myida
- Family: Teredinidae
- Genus: Psiloteredo
- Species: P. megotara

Binomial name
- Psiloteredo megotara (Hanley in Forbes & Hanley, 1848)

= Psiloteredo megotara =

Species of clam

Psiloteredo megotara is a species of saltwater clam, a marine bivalve mollusc in the family Teredinidae, the shipworms.

== Distribution ==
North Atlantic, Mediterranean Sea.
