= S. roseum =

S. roseum may refer to:

- Solanum roseum, a plant species endemic to Bolivia
- Stephopoma roseum, a sea snail species

== Synonyms ==
- Scindalma roseum, a synonym for Fomitopsis rosea
- Stylidium roseum, a synonym for Stylidium tenellum, a plant species
