= Bankia carinata =

Scientific classification
- Domain: Eukaryota
- Kingdom: Animalia
- Phylum: Mollusca
- Class: Bivalvia
- Order: Myida
- Family: Teredinidae
- Genus: Bankia
- Species: B. carinata

Binomial name
- Bankia carinata (Gray, 1827)

Species of bivalve

Bankia carinata is a species of bivalves belonging to the family Teredinidae.

The species has almost cosmopolitan distribution.
