= Tenagodus barbadensis =

Scientific classification
- Kingdom: Animalia
- Phylum: Mollusca
- Class: Gastropoda
- Subclass: Caenogastropoda
- Order: incertae sedis
- Family: Siliquariidae
- Genus: Tenagodus
- Species: T. barbadensis

Binomial name
- Tenagodus barbadensis Bieler, 2004

Species of gastropod

Tenagodus barbadensis is a species of sea snail, a marine gastropod mollusk in the family Siliquariidae.

== Distribution ==
They occur off the coasts of Barbados.

== Description ==
The maximum recorded shell length is 48.9 mm.

== Habitat ==
Minimum recorded depth is 101 m. Maximum recorded depth is 101 m.

It lives as an obligatory commensal on certain species of sponges from families Halichondriidae and Thrombidae.
