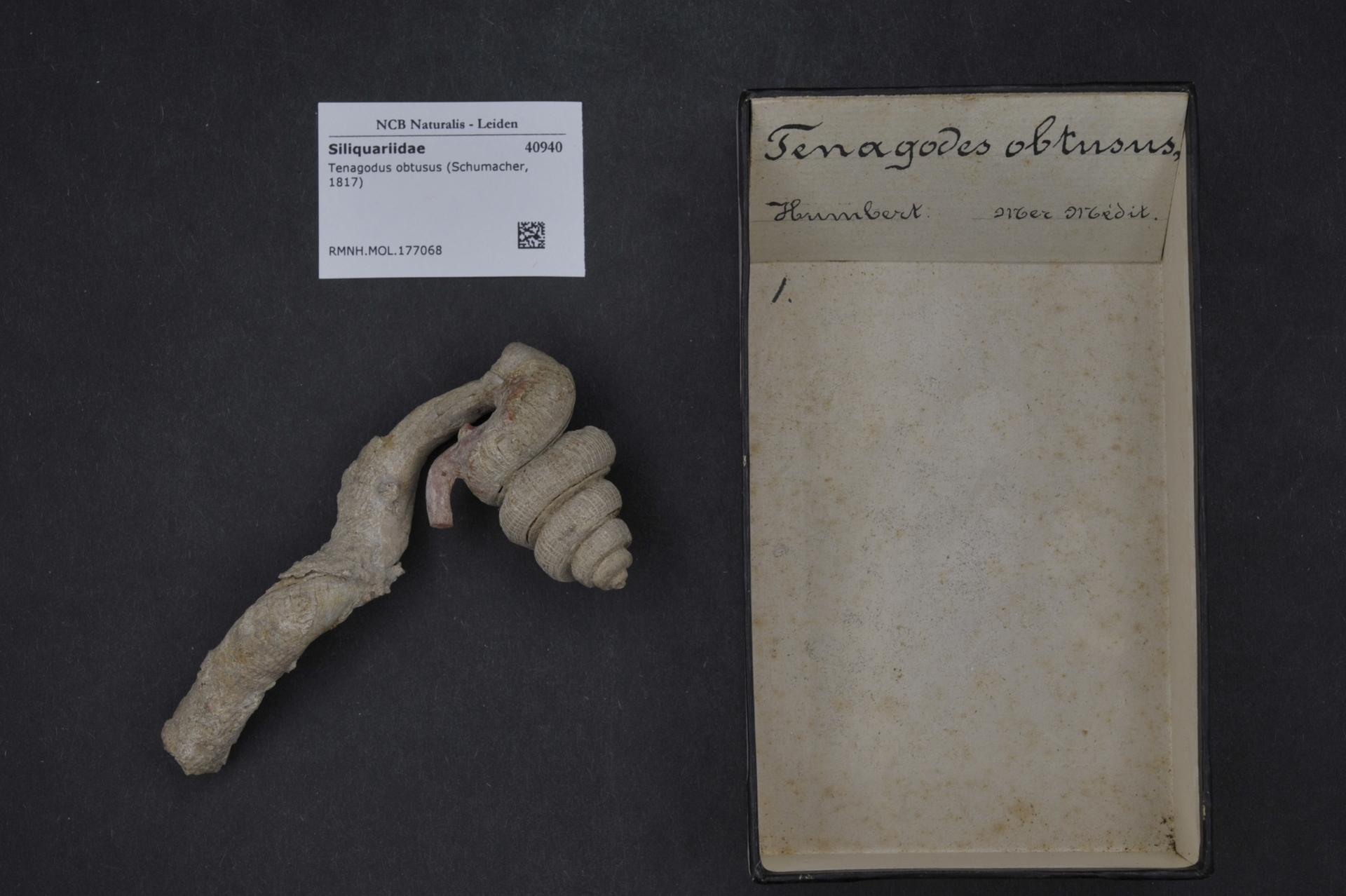

Scientific classification
- Kingdom: Animalia
- Phylum: Mollusca
- Class: Gastropoda
- Subclass: Caenogastropoda
- Order: incertae sedis
- Family: Siliquariidae
- Genus: Tenagodus
- Species: T. obtusus

Binomial name
- Tenagodus obtusus (Schumacher, 1817)

Synonyms
- Anguinaria obtusa Schumacher, 1817; Siliquaria spiralis Risso, 1826 (dubious synonym); Tenagodus (Tenagodus) obtusus (Schumacher, 1817)

= Tenagodus obtusus =

Species of gastropod

Tenagodus obtusus is a species of sea snail, a marine gastropod mollusk in the family Siliquariidae.
