= Succinodon =

Bivalves misidentified as a dinosaur

Succinodon putzeri (meaning "narrow jaw") was the scientific name given by German paleontologist Friedrich von Huene to a fossil that he attributed to the sauropod family Titanosauridae. It was discovered in late-Cretaceous rock near Warsaw, Poland, in 1941. He believed it to be a jaw bone.

In 1981, however, an analysis by Polish paleontologists Krystyna Pożaryska and Halina Pugaczewska showed that the specimen was actually a piece of fossilized wood filled with the burrowings of wood-boring bivalves in the family Teredinidae, most likely in the genus Kuphus.

== See also ==
- Aachenosaurus
