= Teredo clappi =

Scientific classification
- Kingdom: Animalia
- Phylum: Mollusca
- Class: Bivalvia
- Order: Myida
- Family: Teredinidae
- Genus: Teredo
- Species: T. clappi

Binomial name
- Teredo clappi Bartsch, 1923

Synonyms
- Teredo adanensis Roch, 1935; Teredo hermitensis Roch, 1929; Teredo renschi Roch, 1935; Teredo trulliformis Miller, 1924

Species of mollusk

Teredo clappi is a species of marine bivalve mollusk in the family Teredinidae, commonly known as shipworms. This species typically inhabits warm marine environments, where it bores into submerged wood such as driftwood, mangrove roots, and wooden marine structures.

== Distribution ==
Originally described by Paul Bartsch in 1923 from specimens collected in Key West, Florida, Teredo clappi has been documented in various parts of subtropical and tropical Pacific, Indian and Western Atlantic Oceans. Notably, it has been recorded in Bermuda and, more recently, in Venezuelan coastal waters, indicating a broader distribution than previously recognised.
