= Bankia (disambiguation) =

Bankia may refer to:

== Biology ==
- Bankia (bivalve), a genus of ship-worms, marine bivalve molluscs of the family Teredinidae
- Bankia (moth), a synonym of the moth genus Deltote in the family Noctuidae

== Organizations ==
- Bankia, a Spanish financial conglomerate

== Locations ==
- Bankya (sometimes spelled Bankia), a town in Bulgaria
