= Stephopoma mamillatum =

Scientific classification
- Kingdom: Animalia
- Phylum: Mollusca
- Class: Gastropoda
- Subclass: Caenogastropoda
- Order: incertae sedis
- Family: Siliquariidae
- Genus: Stephopoma
- Species: S. mamillatum

Binomial name
- Stephopoma mamillatum Morton & Keen, 1960

Species of gastropod

Stephopoma mamillatum is a species of sea snail, a marine gastropod mollusk in the family Vermetidae, the worm snails or worm shells.

== Distribution ==
This species occurs in the Atlantic Ocean off the Cape Verde islands.
