= Tenagodus modestus =

Scientific classification
- Kingdom: Animalia
- Phylum: Mollusca
- Class: Gastropoda
- Subclass: Caenogastropoda
- Order: incertae sedis
- Family: Siliquariidae
- Genus: Tenagodus
- Species: T. modestus

Binomial name
- Tenagodus modestus (Dall, 1881)

Species of gastropod

Tenagodus modestus is a species of sea snail, a marine gastropod mollusk in the family Siliquariidae.

== Description ==
The maximum recorded shell length is 150 mm.

== Habitat ==
Minimum recorded depth is 37 m. Maximum recorded depth is 1472 m.
