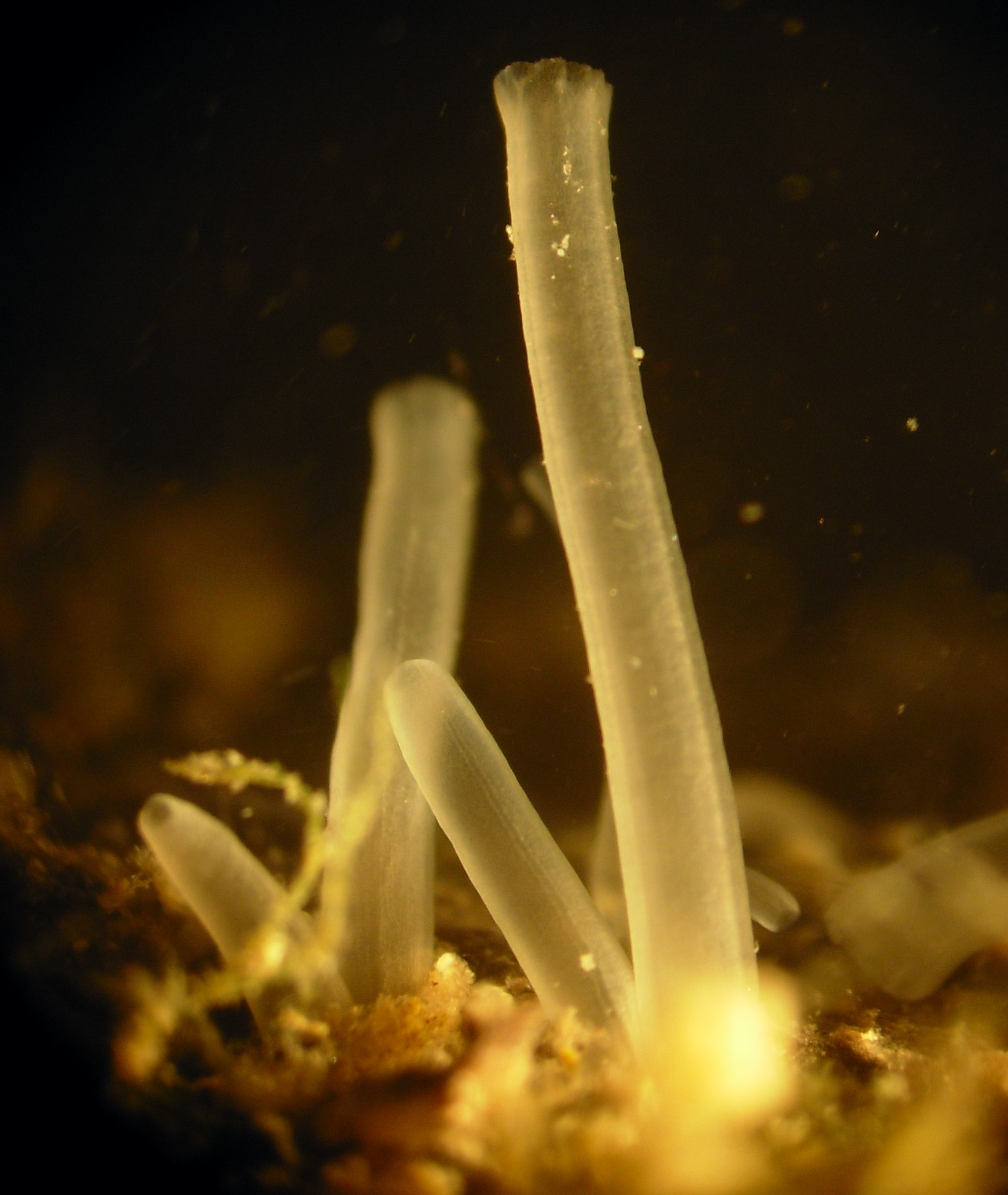
- The siphons of Lyrodus pedicellatus

Scientific classification
- Kingdom: Animalia
- Phylum: Mollusca
- Class: Bivalvia
- Order: Myida
- Superfamily: Pholadoidea
- Family: Teredinidae
- Genus: Lyrodus; Gould, 1870

Type species
- Teredo chlorotica Gould, 1870

Species
- See text

Synonyms
- Cesariana Munari, 1977; Cornuteredo Dall, Bartsch & Rehder, 1938; Rochia Munari, 1975 (non Gray, 1857); Rochiana Munari, 1976 (non Servain, 1881); Teredo (Teredops) Bartsch, 1921 (junior synonym); Teredops Bartsch, 1921

= Lyrodus =

Genus of bivalves

Lyrodus is a genus of ship-worms, marine bivalve molluscs of the family Teredinidae.

== Species in the genus Lyrodus ==
- Lyrodus affinis (Deshayes, 1863)
- Lyrodus auresleporis Munari, 1975
- Lyrodus bipartitus (Jeffreys, 1860) – furrow shipworm
- Lyrodus dicroa (Roch, 1929)
- Lyrodus floridanus (Bartsch, 1922) – Florida shipworm
- Lyrodus massa (Lamy, 1923)
- Lyrodus medilobatus (Edmondson, 1942)
- Lyrodus mersinensis Borges & Merckelbach, 2018
- Lyrodus pedicellatus (de Quatrefages, 1849) – blacktip shipworm
- Lyrodus takanoshimensis (Roch, 1929) – Takanoshima shipworm
- Lyrodus turnerae MacIntosh, 2012

Species brought into synonymy

- Lyrodus tristis (Iredale, 1936): synonym of Lyrodus pedicellatus (Quatrefages, 1849)
