= Tenagodus norai =

Scientific classification
- Kingdom: Animalia
- Phylum: Mollusca
- Class: Gastropoda
- Subclass: Caenogastropoda
- Order: incertae sedis
- Family: Siliquariidae
- Genus: Tenagodus
- Species: T. norai

Binomial name
- Tenagodus norai Bozzetti, 1998

Species of gastropod

Tenagodus norai is a species of sea snail, a marine gastropod mollusk in the family Siliquariidae.
