= Tenagodus squamatus =

Scientific classification
- Kingdom: Animalia
- Phylum: Mollusca
- Class: Gastropoda
- Subclass: Caenogastropoda
- Order: incertae sedis
- Family: Siliquariidae
- Genus: Tenagodus
- Species: T. squamatus

Binomial name
- Tenagodus squamatus (Blainville, 1827)

Species of gastropod

Tenagodus squamatus is a species of sea snail, a marine gastropod mollusk in the family Siliquariidae.

== Distribution ==
From North Carolina to Brazil.

== Description ==
The maximum recorded shell length is 170 mm.

== Habitat ==
Minimum recorded depth is 0 m. Maximum recorded depth is 732 m.
