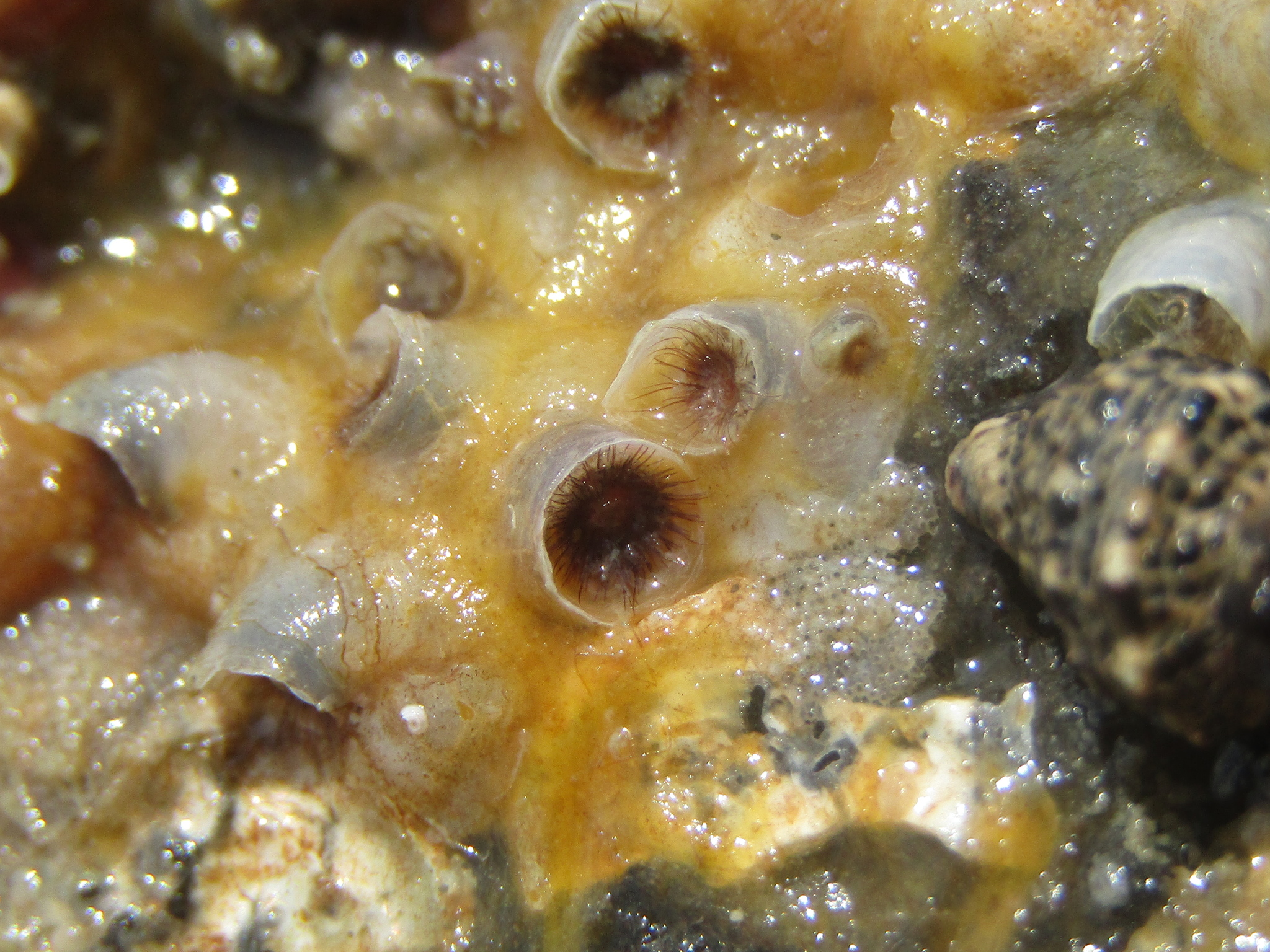

Scientific classification
- Kingdom: Animalia
- Phylum: Mollusca
- Class: Gastropoda
- Subclass: Caenogastropoda
- Order: incertae sedis
- Family: Siliquariidae
- Genus: Stephopoma
- Species: S. roseum

Binomial name
- Stephopoma roseum (Quoy and Gaimard, 1834)

Synonyms
- Vermetus roseus Quoy and Gaimard, 1834; Stephopoma nucleogranosum Suter, 1913; Lilax nucleogranosum Finlay, 1927; Stephopoma roseum Morton, 1951

= Stephopoma roseum =

Species of marine gastropod in the family Siliquariidae

Stephopoma roseum is a species of sea snail, a marine gastropod mollusc in the family Siliquariidae, the slit worm snails.
