= Dorsum Guettard =

Lunar ridge

Dorsum Guettard is a wrinkle-ridge at 10.0°S 18.0°W in Mare Cognitum on the Moon. It is 40 km long and was named after French geologist and mineralogist Jean-Étienne Guettard in 1976.
