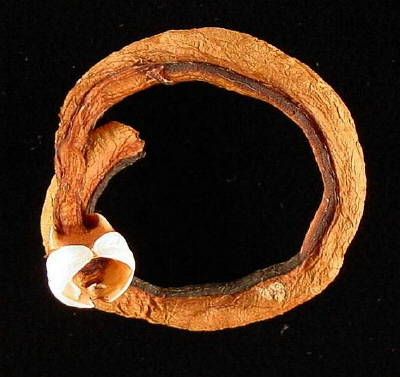

Scientific classification
- Kingdom: Animalia
- Phylum: Mollusca
- Class: Bivalvia
- Order: Myida
- Superfamily: Pholadoidea
- Family: Teredinidae
- Genus: Teredo
- Species: T. navalis

Binomial name
- Teredo navalis Linnaeus, 1758

Synonyms
- Pholas teredo O. F. Müller, 1776; Serpula teredo DaCosta, 1778; Teredo austini Iredale, 1932; Teredo batavus Spengler, 1792; Teredo beachi Bartsch, 1921; Teredo beaufortana Bartsch, 1922; Teredo japonica Clessin, 1893; Teredo marina Jeffreys, 1860; Teredo morsei Bartsch, 1922; Teredo navalis var. occlusa Jeffreys, 1865; Teredo novangliae Bartsch, 1922; Teredo pocilliformis Roch, 1931; Teredo sellii van der Hoeven, 1850; Teredo sinensis Roch, 1929; Teredo vulgaris Lamarck, 1801

= Teredo navalis =

Species of bivalve

Teredo navalis, commonly called the naval shipworm or turu, is a species of saltwater clam, a marine bivalve mollusc in the family Teredinidae. This species is the type species of the genus Teredo. Like other species in this family, this bivalve is called a shipworm because it resembles a worm in general appearance while at the anterior end it has a small shell with two valves, and it is adept at boring through wood.

This species may have originated in the northeast Atlantic Ocean, but has spread around the world. It tunnels into underwater piers and pilings and is a major cause of damage and destruction to submarine timber structures and the hulls of wooden boats.

== Description ==
Teredo navalis has an elongated, reddish, wormlike body which is completely enclosed in a tunnel it has made in floating or submerged timber. At the front end of the animal are two triangular, calcareous plates. These are up to 2 cm (3/4 in) long and correspond to the valves of other bivalve molluscs. They are white, with a covering of pale brown periostracum, and have rough ridges. The mollusc uses them to rasp the wood and slowly enlarges the burrow in which it lives. It has retractable inhalant and exhalant siphons which project through a small hole in the horny septum which blocks the opening of the burrow. When the animal is threatened, the siphons can be drawn inside the burrow and protected by a pair of calcareous oar-like pallets. The tunnel is circular in cross section and is lined with calcareous material extruded by the mollusc. It can be up to 60 cm (24 in) long and 1 cm (1/2 in) in diameter. They are edible, and are traditionally consumed on the island of Marajó and parts of Thailand. They are commonly described as tasting like clam or oyster, and are often prepared in similar ways.

== Distribution and habitat ==
Teredo navalis is found in temperate and tropical seas and oceans worldwide. It may have originated in the northeast Atlantic Ocean, but it is difficult to establish where it originally came from because it has spread so efficiently around the world on debris and hulls of ships. It is found in the littoral zone, living inside submerged timber, pilings, driftwood, and in the hulls of wooden boats. It is found in brackish waters as well as the open sea, and tolerates salinities ranging from five to thirty-five parts per thousand. It is also tolerant of a wide range of temperatures. Individuals have survived temperatures as high as 30 °C (86 °F) and as low as 1 °C (34 °F), though growth and reproduction are restricted to the range from 11 to 25 °C (52 to 77 °F). It can also live without air for about six weeks, using up its stored glycogen reserves. Dispersal to new habitats occurs both during the free-living larval stage, by floating timbers carried along by currents, and, historically, from the hulls of wooden vessels. In the Baltic Sea, there were several mass occurrences in the 1930s and 1950s.

As the Antarctic has no trees, shipworms do not live there. Shipwrecks such as Endurance have been found well-preserved.

== Biology ==
Food particles, mostly timber raspings but also some microalgae, are extracted from the water passing through the gills where gas exchange also takes place. Waste, reproductive gametes, and larvae are discharged through the back of the burrow, which is open to the sea through a narrow aperture.

Teredo navalis is a protandrous hermaphrodite. All individuals start their adult life as males, becoming mature when they are a few centimetres long, releasing sperm into the sea. In warmer areas they change into females about eight to ten weeks after settling, but this change may take six months before it occurs in colder climates. The eggs are fertilised when sperm gets sucked into the burrow of a female through the inhalant siphon. More than a million larva at a time are brooded in the gill chamber, after which they are released into the sea as veliger larvae. By this time they have developed a velum, a ciliated locomotory feeding organ, and the rudiments of a straight-hinged shell. They eat phytoplankton and disperse with the current for two to three weeks. During further larval stages they develop siphons and gills.

When they are ready to undergo metamorphosis, they search for suitable timber on which to settle. They seem to be able to detect rotting wood and are able to swim towards it when they are close enough. Each one then crawls around until it finds a suitable location, where it attaches itself with a byssus thread. It may secrete an enzyme to soften the wood before starting to dig with its foot. When it has formed a hollow, it undergoes a rapid metamorphosis, shedding and consuming the velum and becoming a juvenile shipworm with small horny valves at the anterior end. It can then begin to dig more efficiently. It bores deeper into the wood and spends the rest of its life as a tunneller.

In their gills, shipworms house Teredinibacter turnerae, a symbiotic bacterium which converts nitrogen (dinitrogen) from the water into a form usable by its host, essential for survival on nitrogen-poor diet of wood. The same bacteria produce cellulase, which allows the host to digest the cellulose in the wood. There is evidence to suggest that Teredinibacter turnerae may also have antibiotic properties.

== Economic effects ==
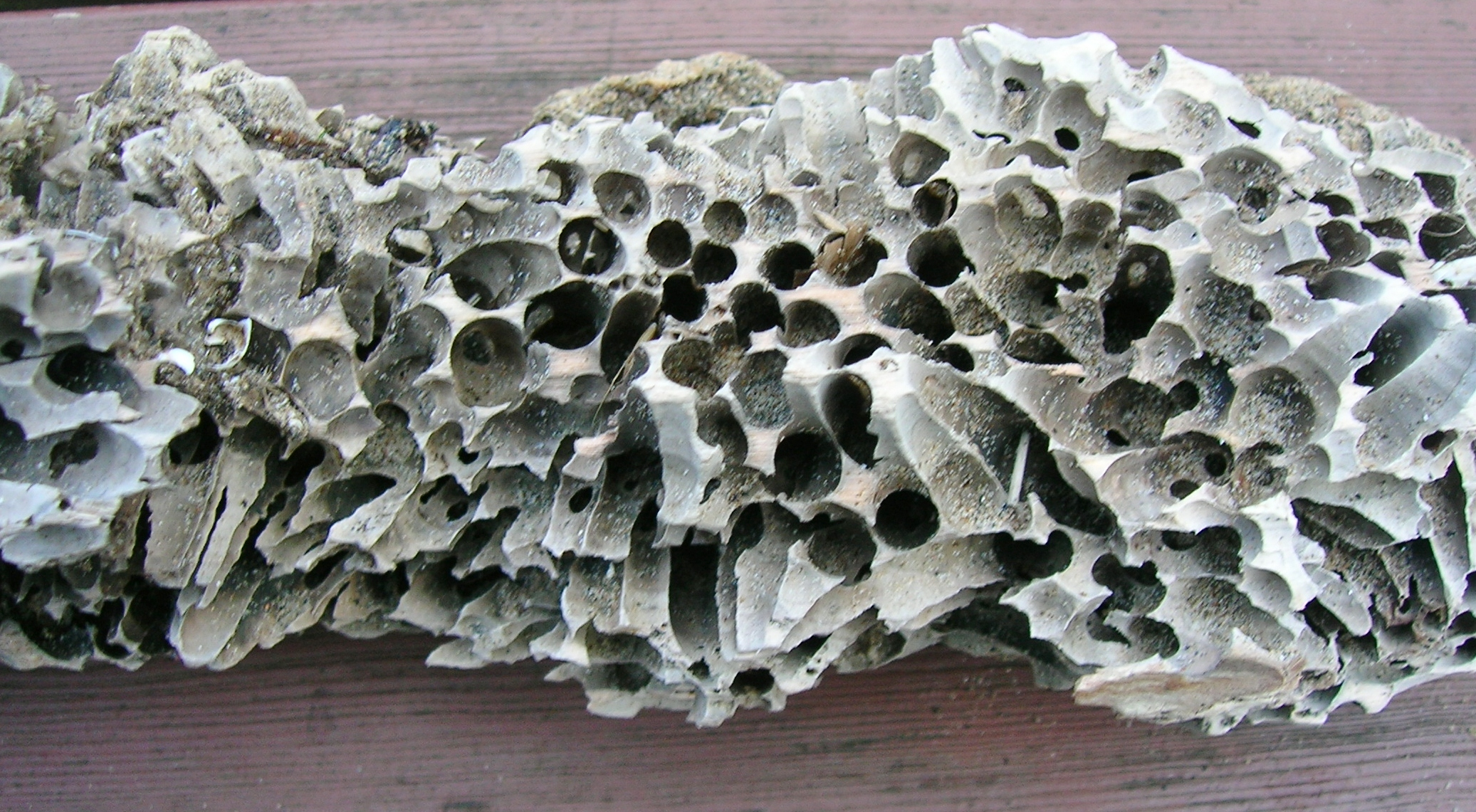
Destruction by Teredo navalis worm in a tree branch

Teredo navalis is a very destructive pest of submerged timber. In the Baltic Sea, pine trees can become riddled with tunnels within 16 weeks of being in the water and oaks within 32 weeks, with whole trees 30 cm (12 in) in diameter being completely destroyed within a year. Ships' timbers are attacked, wrecks destroyed and sea defences damaged. Around 1730 in the Netherlands, shipworms were found to be seriously weakening the wooden dike revetments, and to prevent erosion of the dikes and subsequent flooding disasters the revetments had to be replaced with heavy stones, at great expense. The shipworm's arrival in San Francisco Bay around 1920 heralded great destruction to the piers and wharves of harbours. It has spread in the Pacific Ocean where its greater tolerance of low salinity levels has caused damage in areas previously unaffected by native shipworms.

In the eighteenth century, the Royal Navy resorted to coppering the bottoms of its ships in an attempt to prevent the damage caused by shipworm.

No treatment of timber to prevent attack by Teredo navalis has been completely successful. Experiments by the Dutch in the 19th century proved the inefficacy of linseed oil, metallic paint, powdered glass, carbonization (burning the outer layers of the wood), and any of the usual biocides such as chromated copper arsenate. They also attempted covering wooden pylons with precisely arranged iron nails, but this too had no lasting effect. In 1878, it was discovered that creosote was an effective deterrent, though to work best it had to be applied to soft, resinous woods like pine; in order to work on harder woods such as oak, special care had to be taken to ensure the wood was completely permeated by the creosote. Submerged wrecks have been protected by wrapping them in geotextiles to provide a physical barrier to the larvae or by reburying them in the sediment. No permanent solution has been found.
