= Tenagodus senegalensis =

Scientific classification
- Kingdom: Animalia
- Phylum: Mollusca
- Class: Gastropoda
- Subclass: Caenogastropoda
- Order: incertae sedis
- Family: Siliquariidae
- Genus: Tenagodus
- Species: T. senegalensis

Binomial name
- Tenagodus senegalensis (G. B. Sowerby II, 1876)

Synonyms
- Siliquaria senegalensis G. B. Sowerby II, 1876

Species of gastropod

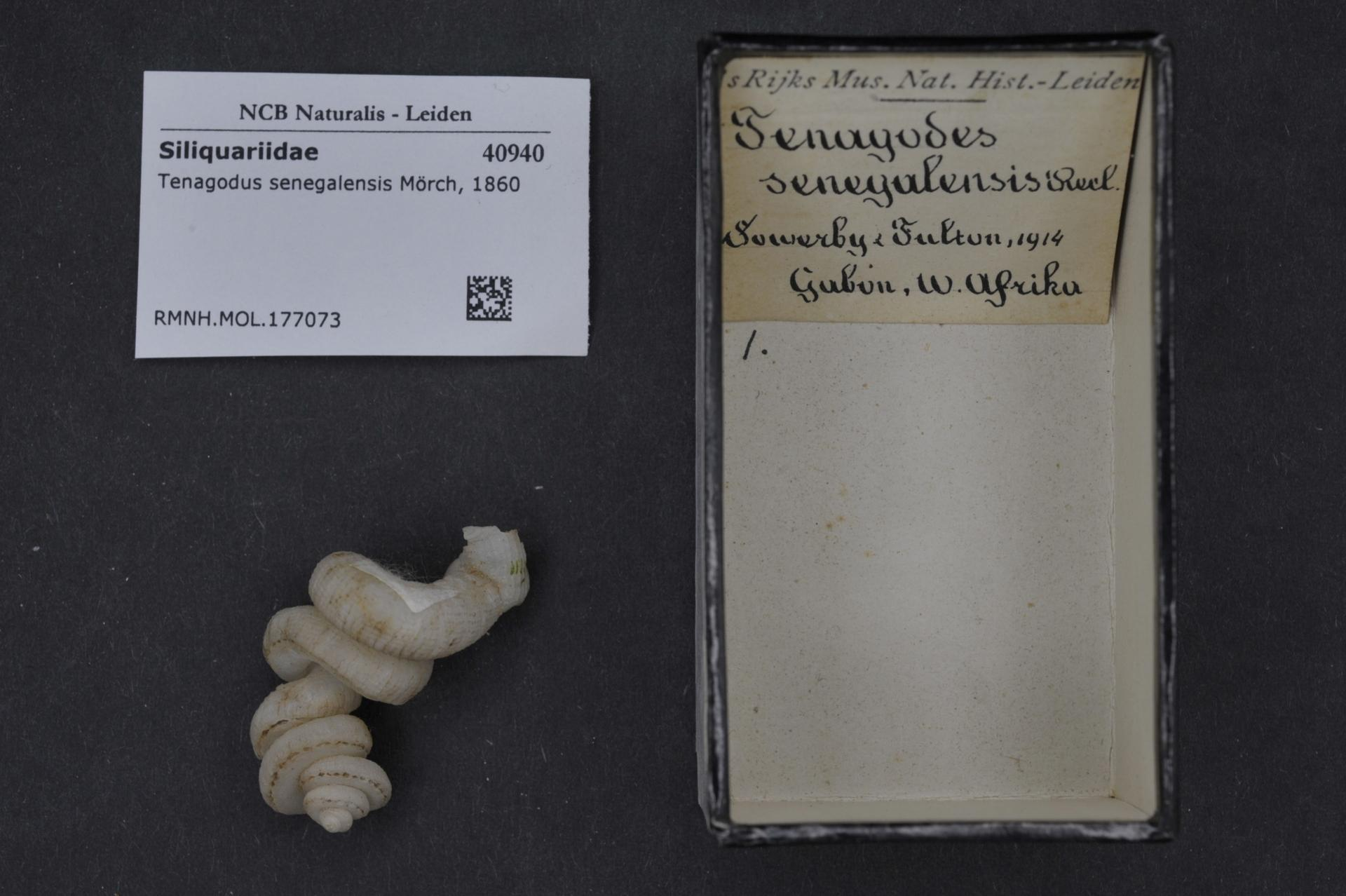
Tenagodus senegalensis - Moerch, 1860

Tenagodus senegalensis is a species of sea snail, a marine gastropod mollusk in the family Siliquariidae.
