= Tenagodus ponderosus =

- Tenagodus ponderosus

Scientific classification
- Kingdom: Animalia
- Phylum: Mollusca
- Class: Gastropoda
- Subclass: Caenogastropoda
- Order: incertae sedis
- Family: Siliquariidae
- Genus: Tenagodus
- Species: T. ponderosus

Binomial name
- Tenagodus ponderosus (Mörch, 1861)

Synonyms
- Siliquaria ponderosa Mörch, 1861

Species of gastropod

Tenagodus ponderosus is a species of sea snail, a marine gastropod mollusk in the family Siliquariidae.

== Distribution ==
Queensland, Australia.
