= False keel =

The false keel was a timber, forming part of the hull of a wooden sailing ship. Typically 6 inches (15 cm) thick for a 74-gun ship in the 19th century, the false keel was constructed in several pieces, which were scarfed together, and attached to the underside of the keel by iron staples. The false keel was intended to protect the main keel from damage, and also protect the heads of the bolts holding the main keel together. The false keel could easily be replaced when it became damaged.

== See also ==
- Worm shoe
