= Tenagodus trochlearis =

Scientific classification
- Kingdom: Animalia
- Phylum: Mollusca
- Class: Gastropoda
- Subclass: Caenogastropoda
- Order: incertae sedis
- Family: Siliquariidae
- Genus: Tenagodus
- Species: T. trochlearis

Binomial name
- Tenagodus trochlearis Mörch, 1861

Synonyms
- Siliquaria trochlearis Mörch, 1861; Tenagodes trochlearis (Mörch, 1861)

Species of gastropod

Tenagodus trochlearis is a species of sea snail, a marine gastropod mollusk in the family Siliquariidae.

== Distribution ==
This marine species occurs off the Philippines.
