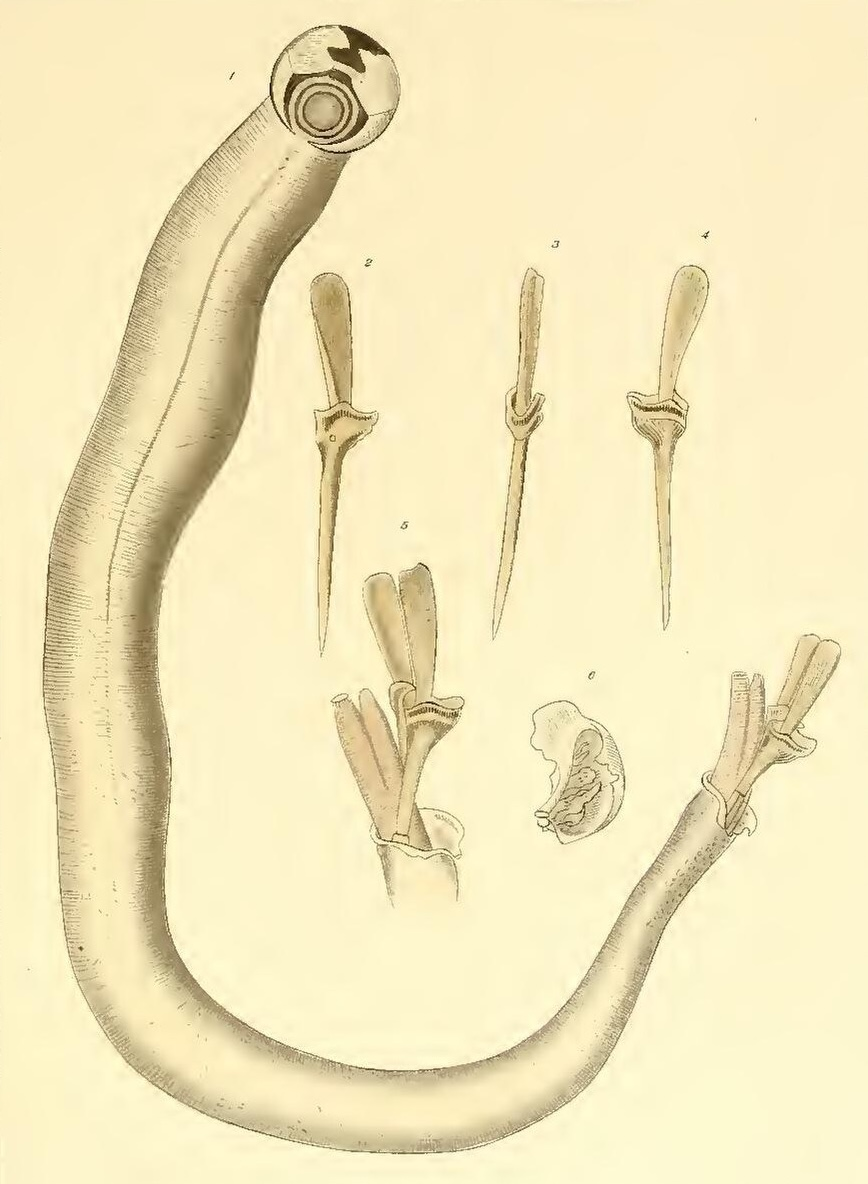
- Bactronophorus thoracites as depicted in Systematisches Conchylien-cabinet

Scientific classification
- Kingdom: Animalia
- Phylum: Mollusca
- Class: Bivalvia
- Order: Myida
- Family: Teredinidae
- Genus: Bactronophorus; Tapparone Canefri, 1877
- Species: B. thoracites

Binomial name
- Bactronophorus thoracites Gould, 1856

= Bactronophorus =

Species of shipworm

Bactronophorus is a genus of shipworm native to the Southeast Asia and Western Pacific. It contains a single species, Bactronophorus thoracites, also known as edible shipworm or tambelo (in Indonesia).

The initial name of the genus was Calobates (as described by Augustus Addison Gould in 1862), but since the term had already been used for the Carpococcyx genus of cuckoos, it was superseded with the current name by Tapparone Canefri in 1877.

== Literature ==
- Lee, S. Y.; Mohamed, R.; Lamasudin, D. U. (2019). "Morphology and molecular phylogenetic placement of a coastal shipworm (Bactronophorus thoracites (Gould, 1862), Teredinidae) from Peninsular Malaysia". Regional Studies in Marine Science. 29. doi:10.1016/j.rsma.2019.100694.
