= Worm shoe =

Part of a wooden boat

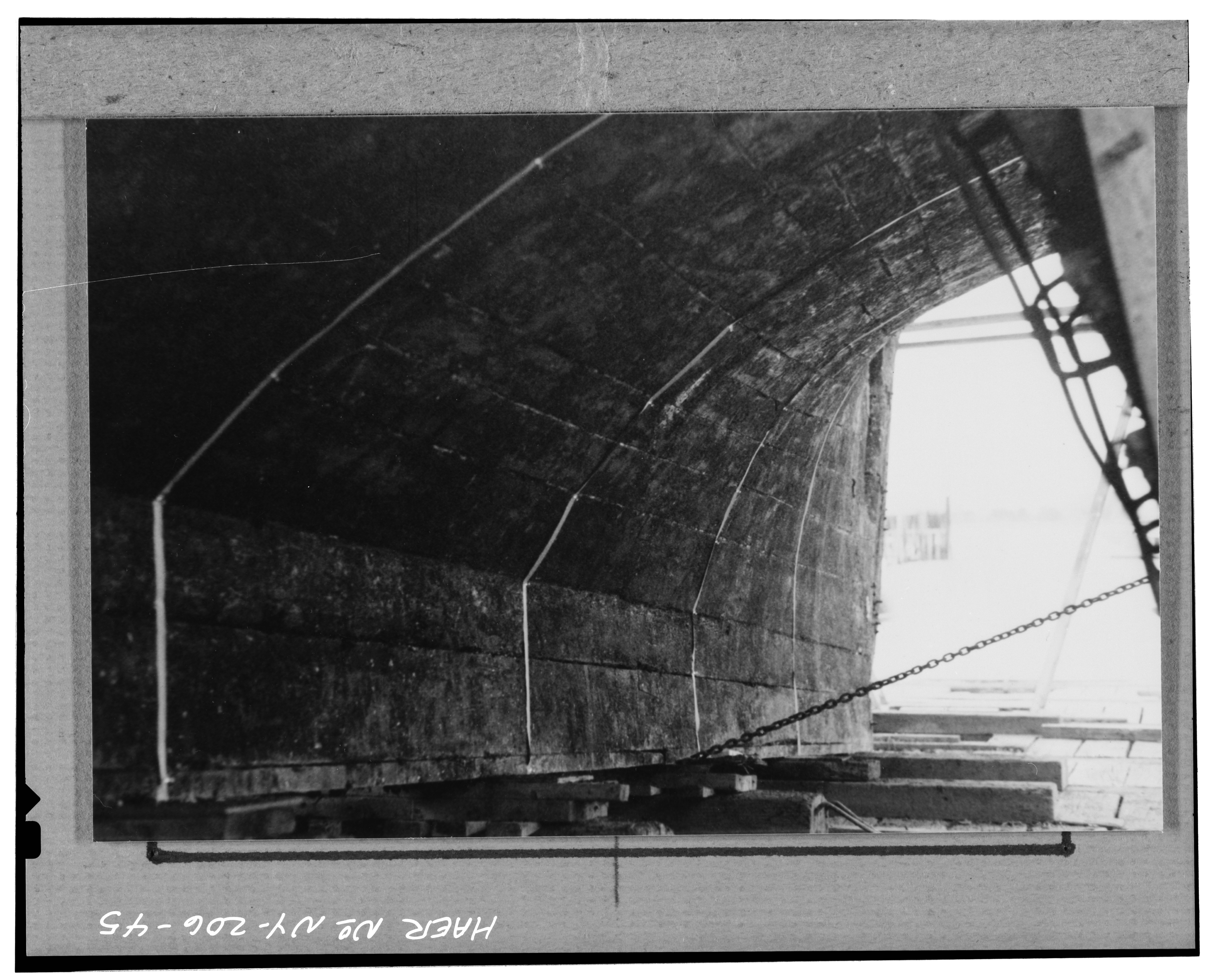
The hull of schooner Lettie G. Howard with its keel, false keel and worm shoe

A worm shoe is a strip of wood such as oak or pine which is fixed to the keel of a wooden boat to protect it from shipworms. The wood is sacrificed to the worms while the main structure is kept separate and safe using a layer of tar paper or creosoted felt, which the worms will not penetrate.
