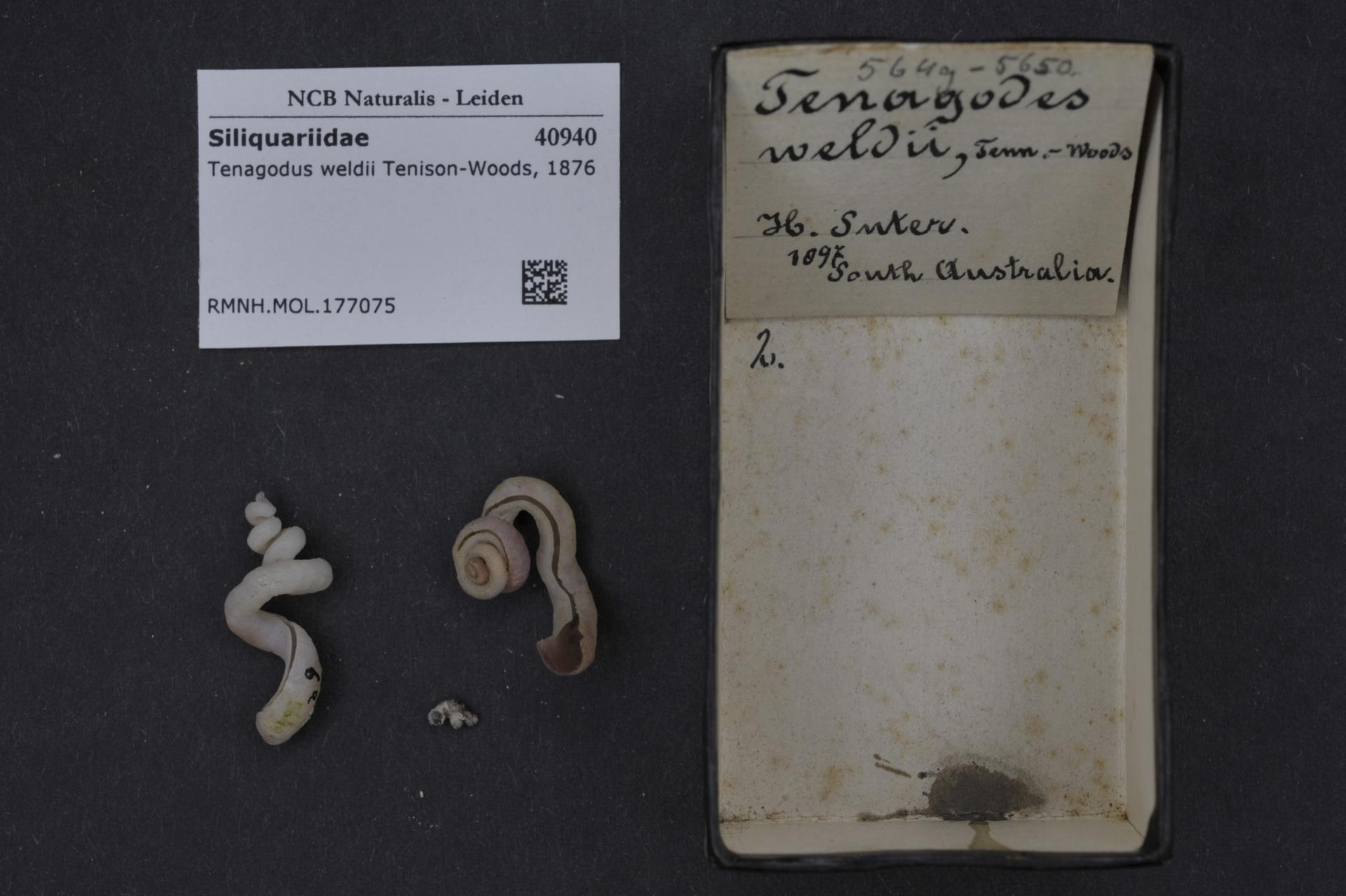

Scientific classification
- Kingdom: Animalia
- Phylum: Mollusca
- Class: Gastropoda
- Subclass: Caenogastropoda
- Order: incertae sedis
- Family: Siliquariidae
- Genus: Tenagodus
- Species: T. weldii

Binomial name
- Tenagodus weldii Tenison Woods, 1876

Synonyms
- Siliquaria weldii (Tenison Woods, 1876); Pyxipoma weldii (Tenison Woods, 1876)

= Tenagodus weldii =

Species of mollusc

Tenagodus weldii is a species of sea snail, a marine gastropod mollusc in the family Siliquariidae, common name the slit worm snails. It was first described by Julian Tenison-Woods in 1876. This species is endemic to New Zealand.
