= Stephopoma =

Scientific classification
- Kingdom: Animalia
- Phylum: Mollusca
- Class: Gastropoda
- Subclass: Caenogastropoda
- Order: incertae sedis
- Family: Siliquariidae
- Genus: Stephopoma; Mörch, 1860

Species
- See text

Synonyms
- Lilax Finlay, 1926

Genus of gastropods

Stephopoma is a genus of sea snails, marine gastropod molluscs in the family Siliquariidae, the "slit worm shells" or "slit worm snails".

== Species ==
Species within the genus Stephopoma include:

- Stephopoma abrolhosense Bieler, 1997
- Stephopoma lacunosum (Barnard, 1963)
- Stephopoma levispinosum
- Stephopoma mamillatum Morton & Keen, 1960
- Stephopoma myrakeenae Olsson & McGinty, 1958
- Stephopoma nucleocostatum May, 1915
- Stephopoma nucleogranosum Verco, 1904
- Stephopoma pennatum Mørch, 1860
- Stephopoma quincunx (Barnard, 1963)
- Stephopoma roseum (Quoy and Gaimard, 1834)
- Stephopoma tricuspe Mörch, 1861
