= Tenagodus lacteus =

Scientific classification
- Kingdom: Animalia
- Phylum: Mollusca
- Class: Gastropoda
- Subclass: Caenogastropoda
- Order: incertae sedis
- Family: Siliquariidae
- Genus: Tenagodus
- Species: T. lacteus

Binomial name
- Tenagodus lacteus Lamarck, 1818

Synonyms
- Siliquaria lactea Lamarck, 1818

Species of gastropod

Tenagodus lacteus is a species of sea snail, a marine gastropod mollusk in the family Siliquariidae.
