= Psiloteredo =

Scientific classification
- Kingdom: Animalia
- Phylum: Mollusca
- Class: Bivalvia
- Order: Myida
- Superfamily: Pholadoidea
- Family: Teredinidae
- Genus: Psiloteredo; Bartsch, 1922

Species
- See text.

Genus of ship-worm

Psiloteredo is a genus of ship-worms, marine bivalve molluscs of the family Teredinidae.

== Species in the genus Psiloteredo ==
- Psiloteredo healdi (Bartsch, 1931)
- Psiloteredo megotara (Hanley in Forbes & Hanley, 1848)
- Psiloteredo senegalensis (Blainville, 1824)
