= Tenagodus maoria =

Scientific classification
- Domain: Eukaryota
- Kingdom: Animalia
- Phylum: Mollusca
- Class: Gastropoda
- Subclass: Caenogastropoda
- Family: Siliquariidae
- Genus: Tenagodus
- Species: T. maoria

Binomial name
- Tenagodus maoria (Powell, 1940)

Synonyms
- Siliquaria maoria Powell, 1940

Species of gastropod

Tenagodus maoria is a species of sea snail, a marine gastropod mollusc in the family Siliquariidae, common name the slit worm snails.
