= Teredora princesae =

Scientific classification
- Kingdom: Animalia
- Phylum: Mollusca
- Class: Bivalvia
- Order: Myida
- Family: Teredinidae
- Genus: Teredora
- Species: T. princesae

Binomial name
- Teredora princesae (Sivickis, 1928)

Synonyms
- Teredo alfredensis van Hoepen, 1941; Teredo diederichseni Roch, 1929; Teredo gazellae Roch, 1929; Teredo gregoryi Dall, Bartsch & Rehder, 1938; Teredo minori Nair, 1958; Teredo petersi Moll, 1928; Teredo princesae Sivickis, 1928; Teredo sparcki Roch, 1931

Species of bivalve

Teredora princesae is a species of marine bivalve mollusc in the family Teredinidae, the shipworms. This species lives in timber that is floating in the western Pacific Ocean.

== Description ==
Like other shipworms, Teredora princesae has an elongated, wormlike body which is completely enclosed in a tunnel it has made in floating or submerged timber. At the front end of the animal are two calcareous valves, as found in other bivalve molluscs. These are white and sharp and have rough ridges that are used to rasp the timber and slowly elongate the burrow. Food particles and oxygen are extracted by the gills from the water that has been sucked into the burrow. Waste and reproductive cells are discharged through the opening at the back of the burrow.

The life cycle is likely to be similar to other shipworms where the males release their gametes into the water and some of the sperm gets drawn into the burrows of females. The fertilised eggs are retained in the mothers' gill chambers where they begin their development. Later they are released into the sea as veliger larvae. These eat phytoplankton and drift with the currents. When they are ready to undergo metamorphosis they try to find suitable timber on which to settle. There they begin to bore into the wood and spend the rest of their lives as tunnellers.

== Distribution ==
Teredora princesae is found in the western Pacific Ocean at depths down to about 150 metres (490 ft).

== Habitat and travels ==
Tree trunks of the Douglas-fir and other colder-climate trees sometimes wash up on the shores of the tropical Hawaiian Archipelago. The logs are from trees which grew in North America, and that have been carried to Hawaii by the southern branch of the Japanese Current, taking an estimated two years to travel the distance. Within these logs are excavations that were made by the shipworm, Teredora princesae. Inside the shipworm burrows, which may reach a length of 60 centimetres (24 in), are the remains of the shipworms and their shells. Then shipworms do not survive the long journey.

No living adult shipworms of this species have been found in Hawaii or in North America. The excavations within the wood are of varying lengths and diameters, and it appears to be the case that the whole of the life cycle of this species of shipworm takes place in mid-ocean, with larvae settling on the timber and reproducing there as the wood slowly drifts along on the current.
