= Neoteredo =

Scientific classification
- Domain: Eukaryota
- Kingdom: Animalia
- Phylum: Mollusca
- Class: Bivalvia
- Order: Myida
- Family: Teredinidae
- Genus: Neoteredo; Bartsch, 1920

Genus of bivalves

Neoteredo is a genus of bivalves belonging to the family Teredinidae.

The species of this genus are found in Southern America.

Species:

- Neoteredo reynei (Bartsch, 1920)
