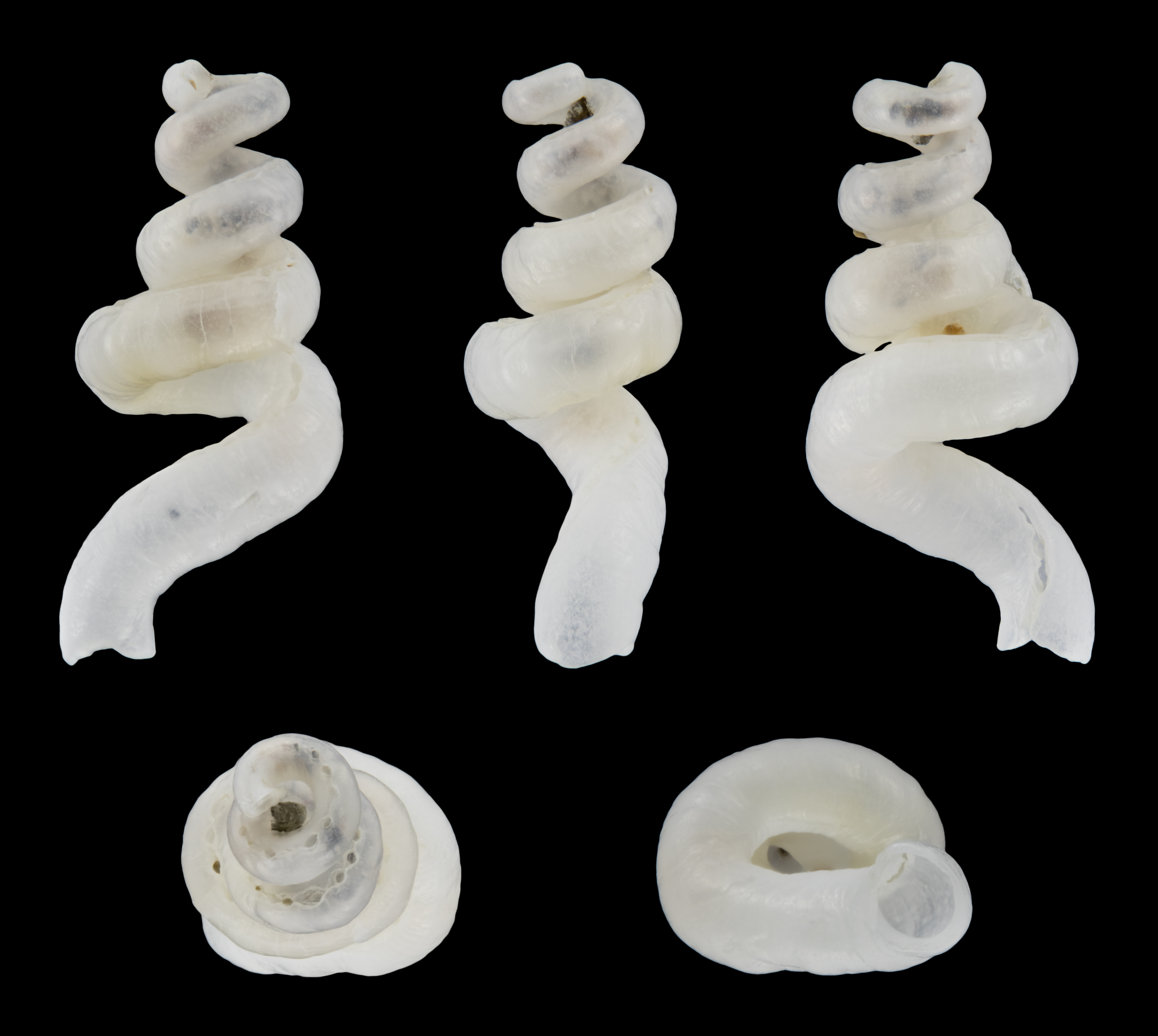

Scientific classification
- Kingdom: Animalia
- Phylum: Mollusca
- Class: Gastropoda
- Subclass: Caenogastropoda
- Order: incertae sedis
- Family: Siliquariidae
- Genus: Tenagodus
- Species: T. cumingii

Binomial name
- Tenagodus cumingii (Mörch, 1861)

Synonyms
- Siliquaria cumingii Mörch, 1861

= Tenagodus cumingii =

Species of gastropod

Tenagodus cumingii is a species of sea snail, a marine gastropod mollusk in the family Siliquariidae.
