= Petalopoma =

Scientific classification
- Kingdom: Animalia
- Phylum: Mollusca
- Class: Gastropoda
- Subclass: Caenogastropoda
- Order: incertae sedis
- Family: Siliquariidae
- Genus: Petalopoma; Schiaparelli, 2002

Genus of gastropods

Petalopoma is a genus of sea snails, marine gastropod mollusks in the family Siliquariidae.

== Species ==
Species within the genus Petalopoma include:

- Petalopoma elisabettae Schiaparelli, 2002
- Petalopoma indoensis Dharma, 2011
