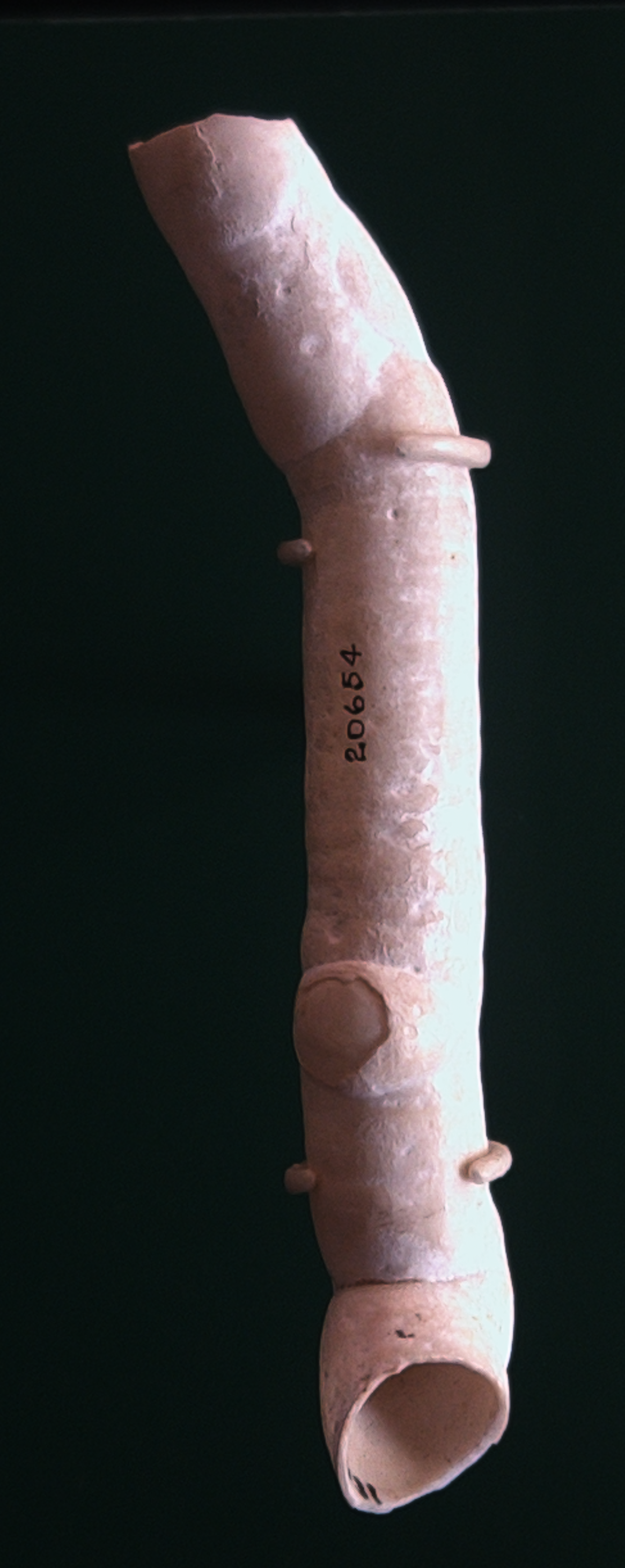
- Calicified tube of Bankia setacea

Scientific classification
- Kingdom: Animalia
- Phylum: Mollusca
- Class: Bivalvia
- Order: Myida
- Superfamily: Pholadoidea
- Family: Teredinidae
- Genus: Bankia; JE Gray, 1842

Species
- See text

= Bankia (bivalve) =

Genus of bivalves

Bankia is a genus of ship-worms, marine bivalve molluscs of the family Teredinidae.

== Species in the genus Bankia ==
- Bankia australis (Calman, 1920)
- Bankia bipennata (Turton, 1819)
- Bankia brevis (Deshayes, 1863)
- Bankia carinata (J. E. Gray, 1827) – carinate shipworm
- Bankia cieba Clench and Turner, 1946
- Bankia destructa Clench and Turner, 1946
- Bankia fimbriatula Moll and Roch, 1931 – fimbriate shipworm
- Bankia fosteri Clench and Turner, 1946
- Bankia gouldi (Bartsch, 1908) – cupped shipworm, gould shipworm
- Bankia martensi (Stempell, 1899)
- Bankia neztalia (Turner and McKoy, 1979)
- Bankia setacea (Tryon, 1863) – feathery shipworm
- Bankia sibirica Roch, 1934
- Bankia zeteki Bartsch, 1921
