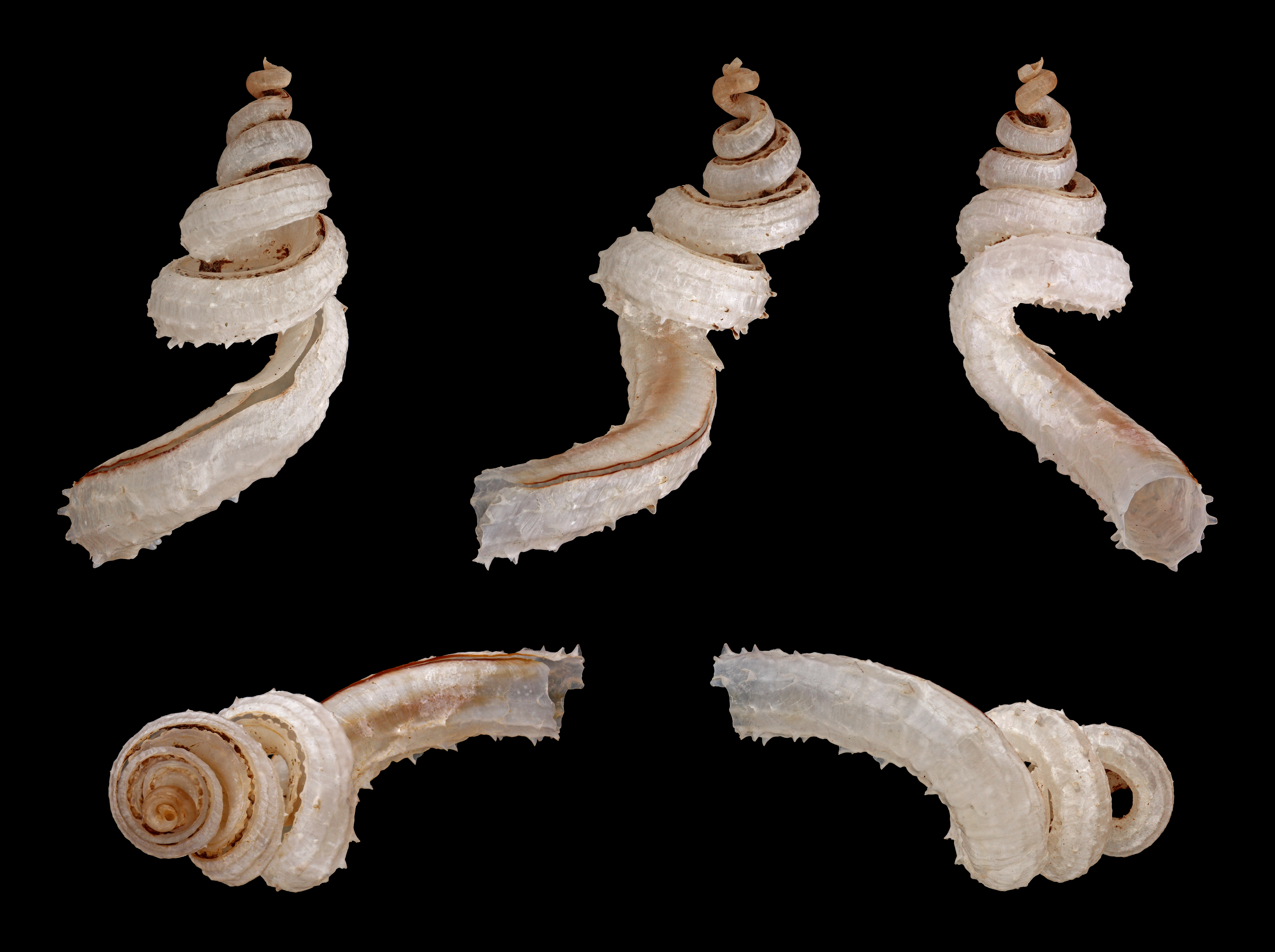
- Five view of a shell of Tenagodus anguinus

Scientific classification
- Kingdom: Animalia
- Phylum: Mollusca
- Class: Gastropoda
- Subclass: Caenogastropoda
- Order: incertae sedis
- Family: Siliquariidae
- Genus: Tenagodus
- Species: T. anguinus

Binomial name
- Tenagodus anguinus (Linnaeus, 1758)

Synonyms
- Serpula anguina Linnaeus, 1758; Serpula muricata Born, 1780; Serpula volvox Dillwyn, 1817; Tenagodes anguinus Linnaeus, 1758

= Tenagodus anguinus =

Species of gastropod

Tenagodus anguinus is a species of unusual sea snail, a marine gastropod mollusk in the family Siliquariidae, the slit worm shells.

== Description ==
The shell is thick and irregularly coiled in a gradually tapered spiral, with rather distant whorls. It has longitudinal ridges with spines on them throughout its length. It is generally a dirty-looking white colour, pale yellow or buff. The uncoiled length could be up to 8 inches (200 mm).

== Distribution ==
Tenagodus anguinus is found in the Indian Ocean including around Madagascar.
