= Jean-Étienne Guettard =

French scientist (1715–1786)

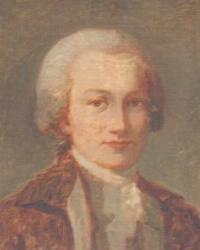
- Jean-Étienne Guettard
- Born: 22 September 1715; Étampes
- Died: 7 January 1786 (aged 70); Paris
- Scientific career
- Fields: naturalist mineralogy
- Author abbrev. (botany): Guett.

Jean-Étienne Guettard (22 September 1715 – 7 January 1786), was a French naturalist and mineralogist. He was born at Étampes, near Paris.

In boyhood, he gained a knowledge of plants from his grandfather, who was an apothecary, and later he qualified as a doctor in medicine. Pursuing the study of botany in various parts of France and other countries, he began to take notice of the relation between the distribution of plants and the soils and subsoils. In this way his attention came to be directed to minerals and rocks.

In 1746, he communicated to the Academy of Sciences in Paris a memoir on the distribution of minerals and rocks, and this was accompanied by a map on which he had recorded his observations. He thus, as remarked by W. D. Conybeare, "first carried into execution the idea, proposed by Martin Lister years before, of geological maps." In the course of his journeys he made a large collection of fossils and figured many of them, but he had no clear ideas about the sequence of strata.

He made observations also on the degradation of mountains by rain, rivers and sea; and he was the first to ascertain the existence of former volcanoes in the district of Auvergne.

In 1759, Guettard was elected a foreign member of the Royal Swedish Academy of Sciences.

He died in Paris on 7 January 1786.

His publications include:

- Observations sur les plantes (2 vols, 1747)
- Histoire de la découverte faite en France de matières semblables à celles dont la porcelaine de la Chine est composée (1765)
- Mémoires sur différentes parties des sciences et arts (5 vols, 1768–1783)
- Mémoires sur la minéralogie du Dauphiné (2 vols, 1779).
- Atlas et description minéralogiques de la France (1780)
- "Atlas minéralogique de la France, volume de planches" (1780)

== See also ==
- Dorsum Guettard, a wrinkle ridge on the Moon named after him.
