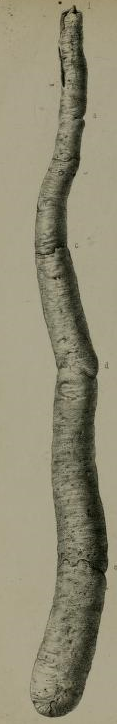
- Depiction of Kuphus polythalamius in Gray (1857)

Scientific classification
- Kingdom: Animalia
- Phylum: Mollusca
- Class: Bivalvia
- Order: Myida
- Family: Teredinidae
- Genus: Kuphus
- Species: K. polythalamius

Binomial name
- Kuphus polythalamius (Linnaeus, 1758)

Synonyms
- Furcella gigantea (Home, 1806); Kuphus clausa Sowerby, 1875; Septaria arenarius Lamarck, 1818; Siliquaria bipartita Martin, 1880; Teredo dubia Sivickis, 1928; Teredo gigantea Home, 1806

= Kuphus polythalamius =

Species of shipworm

Kuphus polythalamius (known as giant tamilok) is a species of shipworm, a marine bivalve mollusc in the family Teredinidae.

== Description ==
The tube of Kuphus polythalamius is known as a crypt and is a calcareous secretion designed to enable the animal to live in its preferred habitat, the mud of mangrove swamps. A typical specimen measures 100 cm (40 in) in length and is shaped like a truncated elephant's tusk. The wider, anterior end is closed, has a rounded tip, and is about 110 mm (4.5 in) in diameter. From there the tube tapers to an open, posterior end about 38 mm (1.5 in) in diameter, with a central septum. Siphons project through this end for feeding and respiration. They can be withdrawn inside the tube and the end can be sealed with a set of specialised plates or "pallets". The two small valves of the mollusc are inside the tube along with the mantle, gut and other soft organs. In the intact but otherwise empty tube found on the strandline, they can be seen by X-ray photography.

== Longest bivalve ==
The giant clam (Tridacna gigas) is generally considered to be the largest bivalve mollusc. It is indeed the heaviest species, growing to over 200 kg (440 lb) and measuring up to 120 cm (47 in) in length, but Kuphus polythalamius holds the record for the largest bivalve by length. A specimen owned by Victor Dan in the United States has a length of 1,532 mm (60 in), which is considerably longer than the largest giant clam.

== Distribution ==
Today, Kuphus polythalamius is found in the western Pacific Ocean, the western and eastern Indian Ocean and the Indo-Malaysian area. The range includes the Philippines, Indonesia and Mozambique. However, the only thoroughly studied natural habitat of the species is in Kalamansig, Sultan Kudarat in the Philippines.

== Evolution ==
Marine biologist Ruth Turner studied shipworms and considered that their common ancestor would have been very like Kuphus polythalamius, the most primitive of the teredinids. She believed that the anatomy of the tube was such that the animal would not have been able to burrow in wood as other modern teredinids do, but would instead have lived buried in soft sediments.

== Live specimen ==
In April 2017, the species became the focus of international attention when the announcement of a scientific study conducted in the Philippines was misinterpreted by foreign news reporters as the discovery of a rare live specimen. The sample was gunmetal black, and very muscular. While other shipworms feed on submerged wood, K. polythalamius was found to use bacteria in its gills to use hydrogen sulphide in the water as an energy source used to convert carbon dioxide into nutrients. In this respect it resembles the unrelated giant tube worm, which actually is a worm.

Videos uploaded to YouTube, however, already show Philippine scientists dissecting specimens as far back as 2010, after a news feature on a giant tamilok, the local name for the common shipworm, was broadcast on a local TV network. The report by local media celebrity Jessica Soho suggests that local residents in the province of Sultan Kudarat, Mindanao island, were familiar enough with the creature to the point of treating it as a delicacy. After the discovery of the species in Sultan Kudarat, various environmental groups launched a campaign to protect the species and its habitat from further destruction and human consumption. Currently, the municipal waters where the species thrive in is protected by the local government.
