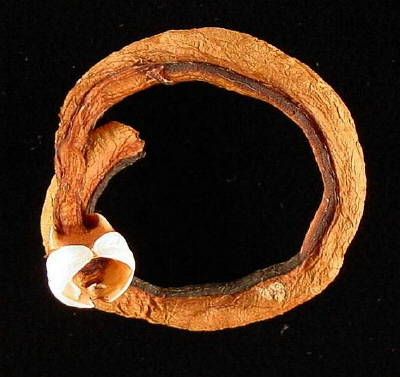
- Dried specimen of Teredo navalis

Scientific classification
- Kingdom: Animalia
- Phylum: Mollusca
- Class: Bivalvia
- Superorder: Imparidentia
- Order: Myida
- Superfamily: Pholadoidea
- Family: Teredinidae; Rafinesque, 1815

Genera
- See text

= Shipworm =

Family of molluscs

Shipworms, teredo worms or simply teredo are a group of xylophagic marine bivalve molluscs in the family Teredinidae that consume wood submerged in saltwater. Their elongated, vermiform appearance makes their classification as bivalves not obvious, and sailors generally refer to them as "worms," a term found in the English shipworm and German Schiffsbohrwurm. However, taxonomically shipworms are more akin to clams.

Shipworms are notorious for boring into (and eventually destroying) any wooden structure that is immersed in seawater, including piers, docks, and ships. Shipworms drill passages into wood by using their valves (shells) to rasp away and consume timber. They are sometimes called "termites of the sea".

Carl Linnaeus assigned the common name Teredo (from Ancient Greek τερηδών (terēdṓn) 'wood-worm', via Latin terēdō) to the best-known genus of shipworms in the 10th edition of Systema Naturæ (1758).

One species, Kuphus polythalamia, can reach over 1.6 m in length and 7 cm in diameter, making it one of the world's largest bivalves. This species consumes wood until it matures, after which it settles into marine sediment and relies on its symbiotic relationship with chemoautotrophic sulfur-eating bacteria for nutrition.

Another species of shipworm, Lithoredo abatanica, burrows and feeds on carbonated limestone and lives in fresh water.

== Description ==
Depending on the species, a full grown teredo worm ranges from several centimeters to approximately a meter in length. An average adult shipworm measures 10 to 15 centimetres (4 to 6 in) in length and less than 6 mm (1/4 in) in diameter, but some species grow to considerable size, with Kuphus polythalamia reaching over 1.6 m in length and 7 cm in diameter.

=== Anatomy ===
The body is cylindrical, slender, naked, and superficially worm-shaped. In spite of their worm-like appearance shipworms still possess recognisable bivalve morphology, including valves, ctinidia, a mantle, and siphons. The ctinidia lie mainly within the branchial siphon, through which the animal pumps water over the gills. The two siphons are very long and protrude from the posterior end of the animal. Where they leave the end of the main part of the body, the siphons pass between a pair of calcareous plates called pallets. If the animal is alarmed, it withdraws the siphons and the pallets protectively block the opening of the tunnel.

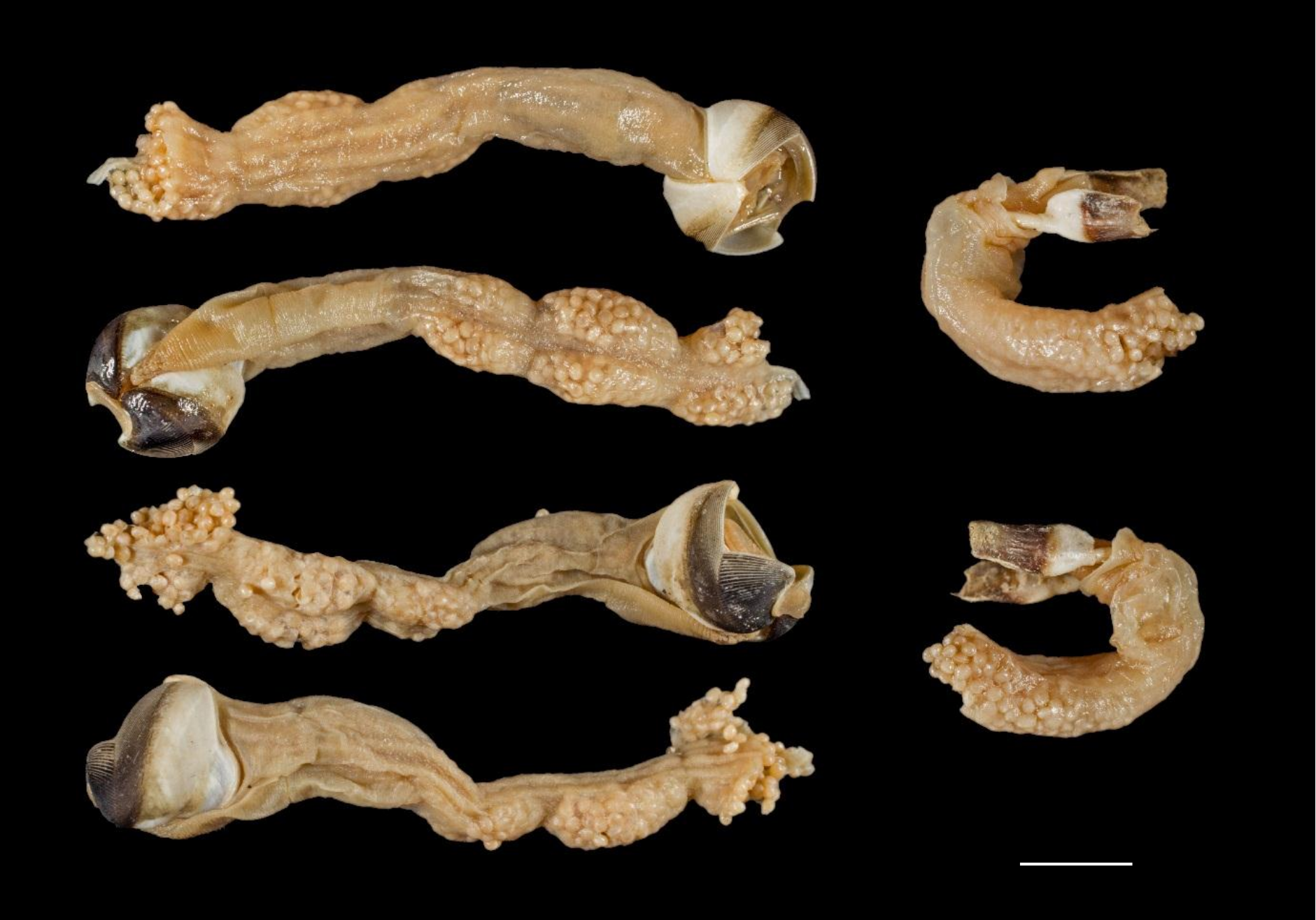
Bisected Lyrodus pedicellatus. Valves are shown on the left of the image, while pallets are on the right

The two valves of the main shell are at the anterior end of the animal. Because they are the organs that the animal applies to boring its tunnel, they generally are located at the tunnel's end. They are borne on the slightly thickened, muscular anterior end of the cylindrical body and they are roughly triangular in shape and markedly concave on their interior surfaces. The outer surfaces are convex and in most species are deeply sculpted into sharp grinding surfaces with which the animals bore their way through the wood or similar medium in which they live and feed. The valves of shipworms are separated and the aperture of the mantle lies between them. The small "foot" (corresponding to the foot of a clam) can protrude through the aperture.

When shipworms bore into submerged wood, bacterial symbionts embedded within a sub-organ called the typhlosole in the shipworm gut, aid in the digestion of the ingested wood particles. The Alteromonas or Alteromonas-sub-group of bacteria identified as the symbiont species in the typhlosole, are known to digest lignin, and wood material in general. The tough molecular layers of lignin surround the cellulose elementary fibrils in the wood particles, and the lignin must be digested initially to allow access by other enzymes into the cellulose for digestion. Another bacterial species (Teredinibacter turnerae), in the gills secrete a variety of cellulose-digesting enzymes which may be secreted into the shipworm gut via a special organ called the gland of Deshayes. These secretions aid the shipworm's own carbohydrate-active enzymes (CAZymes) in digesting the wood particles in combination with the enzymes and potentially other metabolites secreted by the symbiont bacterial in the typhlosole.

The excavated burrow is usually lined with a calcareous tube. The valves of the shell of shipworms are small separate parts located at the anterior end of the worm, used for excavating the burrow. The protective role of the shells is lost because the animal spends all its life surrounded by wood.

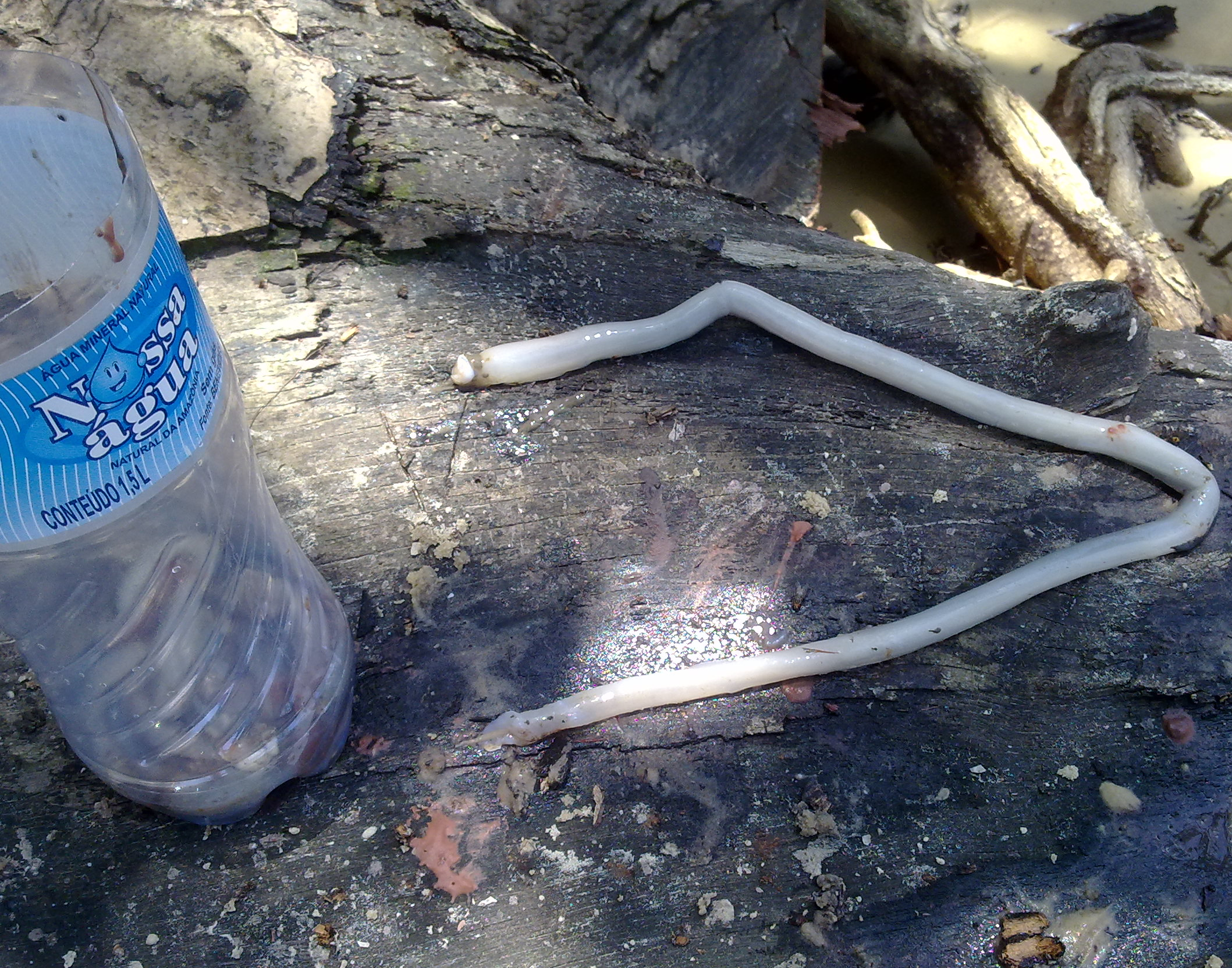
Teredo worm from a mangrove in Marajo island, Brazil

Teredo navalis develops from eggs to metamorphosing larvae in about five weeks. They spend half of this time in the mother's gill chamber before being discharged as free-swimming larvae into the sea. Their sexes alternate, young are hermaphrodites while adults can be either male or female. Typically, organisms are male at first and female subsequently. A second male to female phase may occur, however shipworms rarely live long enough to complete the second phase. They have a lifespan of 1 to 3 years.

== Physiology ==
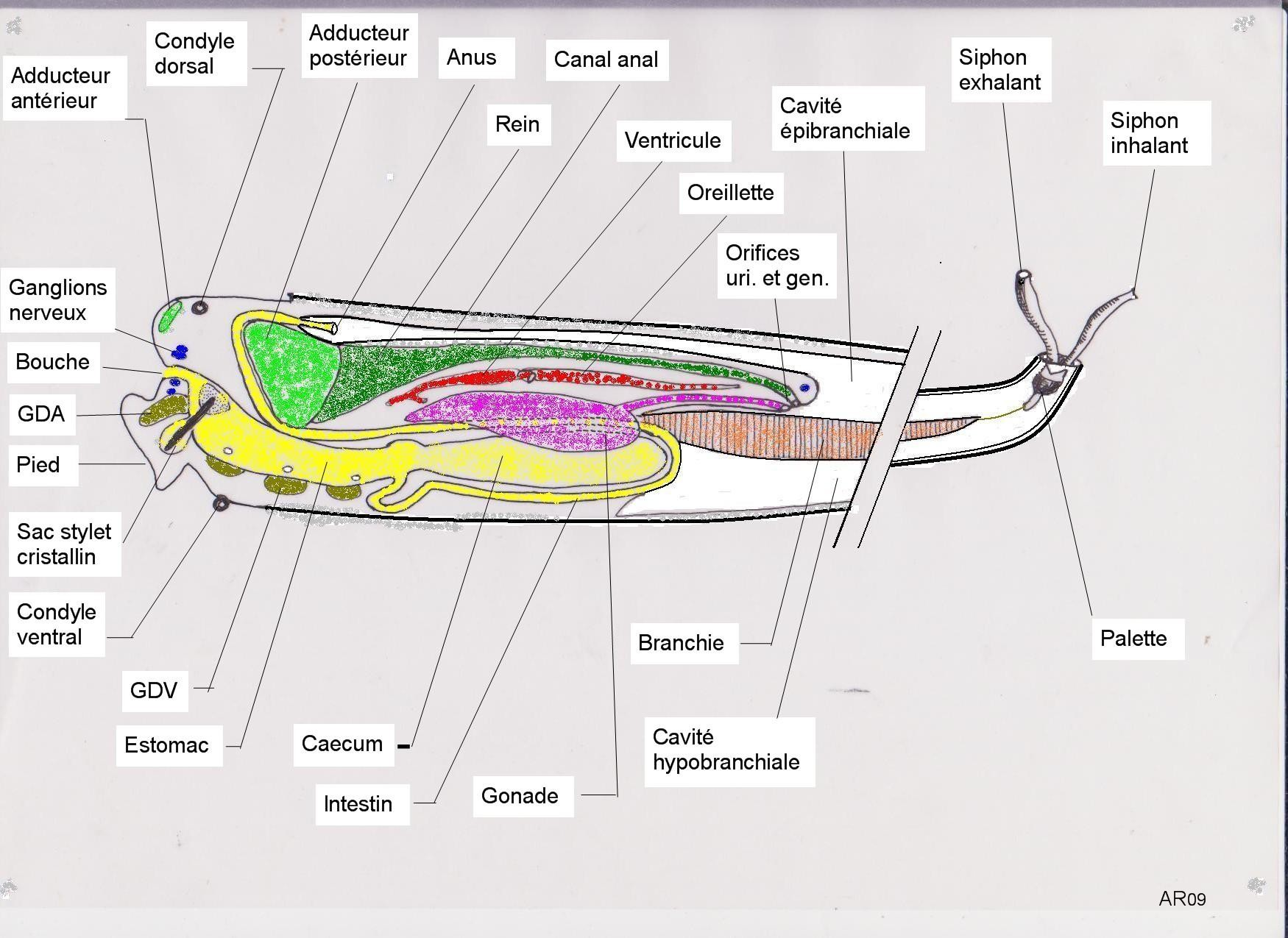
Disposition of the main organs in a shipworm. GDA: anterior digestive gland; GDV: ventral digestive gland, with its orifices in the stomach. Orifices uri. et gen., urinary and genital orifices. The left ventricle is sectioned near its base. The nerve ganglion is in blue. The distance between pallets and foot spans several time the animal's diameter.

Shipworm anatomy reveals the typical organs of a bivalve mollusk, although with dimensional or positional peculiarities due to the thinness and length of the occupied space. Furthermore, some structures find no equivalent in other bivalve groups.

- Gills are divided in two halves, the anterior one of small size, the posterior one much more developed. They are linked by the alimentary tract running on the side of the visceral mass.
- The heart-kidney system is tilted, bringing the kidneys in a dorsal position relative to the heart, whose atria find themselves behind the ventricle. Furthermore, the anterior and posterior aorta become respectively posterior and anterior.
- The anus opens at the end of a long anal tube.
- The digestive gland is divided into several parts, with separate orifices in the stomach.
- A vast caecum is linked to the stomach.
- The digestive tube bears a very peculiar structure, the gland of Deshayes, probably homologous to salivary glands, which link to the oesophagus and stretch to the dorsal side of the posterior part of the gills.
- The orifice of the gallery bears pallets with their own musculature.
- The siphon retractor muscles are inserted on the calcareous covering of the gallery, and not on the shell's valves which are much further out.
- The anterior and posterior anterior muscles have an antagonistic action.

Normally, the shipworm's body fills the entire length of the gallery, but the anterior region can retract itself slightly with respect to the latter's extremity. Without the gills, the viscera only cover one-fourth of the total length and only their anterior part is partially covered by the shell.

=== Digestion ===
When shipworms bore into submerged wood, bacterial symbionts embedded within a sub-organ called the typhlosole in the shipworm gut, aid in the digestion of the ingested wood particles. The Alteromonas or Alteromonas-sub-group of bacteria identified as the symbiont species in the typhlosole, are known to digest lignin, and wood material in general. The tough molecular layers of lignin surround the cellulose elementary fibrils in the wood particles, and the lignin must be digested initially to allow access by other enzymes into the cellulose for digestion. Another bacterial species (Teredinibacter turnerae), in the gills secrete a variety of cellulose-digesting enzymes which may be secreted into the shipworm gut via a special organ called the gland of Deshayes. These secretions aid the shipworm's own carbohydrate-active enzymes (CAZymes) in digesting the wood particles in combination with the enzymes and potentially other metabolites secreted by the symbiont bacterial in the typhlosole.

== Taxonomy ==
Shipworms are marine animals in the phylum Mollusca, class Bivalvia, family Teredinidae. They were included in the now obsolete order Eulamellibranchiata, in which many documents still place them.

Ruth Turner of Harvard University was the leading 20th century expert on the Teredinidae; she published a detailed monograph on the family, the 1966 volume A Survey and Illustrated Catalogue of the Teredinidae published by the Museum of Comparative Zoology. More recently, the endosymbionts that are found in the gills have been subject to study the bioconversion of cellulose for fuel energy research.

Shipworm species comprise several genera, of which Teredo is the most commonly mentioned. The best known species is Teredo navalis. Historically, Teredo concentrations in the Caribbean Sea have been substantially higher than in most other salt water bodies.

Genera within the family Teridinidae include:

- Bactronophorus Tapparone-Canefri, 1877
- Bankia Gray, 1842
- Dicyathifer Iredale, 1932
- Kuphus Guettard, 1770
- Lithoredo Shipway, Distel & Rosenberg, 2019
- Lyrodus Binney, 1870
- Nausitoria Wright, 1884
- Neoteredo Bartsch, 1920
- Nototeredo Bartsch, 1923
- Psiloteredo Bartsch, 1922
- Spathoteredo Moll, 1928
- Teredo Linnaeus, 1758
- Teredora Bartsch, 1921
- Teredothyra Bartsch, 1921
- Uperotus Guettard, 1770
- Zachsia Bulatoff & Rjabtschikoff, 1933

== Species ==
The Teredo genus has approximately 20 species that live in wooden materials such as logs, pilings, ship, and practically any other submerged wooden construction from temperate to tropical ocean zones. The species is thought to be native to the Atlantic Ocean and was once known as the Atlantic shipworm, although its exact origin is unknown. The longest marine bivalve, Kuphus polythalamia, was found from a lagoon near Mindanao island in the southeastern part of the Philippines, which belongs to the same group of mussels and clams. The existence of huge mollusks was established for centuries and studied by the scientists, based on the shells they left behind that were the size of baseball bats (length 1.5 m or 4 ft 11 in, diameter 6 cm or 2 1/2 in). The bivalve is a rare creature that spends its life inside an elephant tusk-like hard shell made of calcium carbonate. It has a protective cap over its head which it reabsorbs to burrow into the mud for food. The case of the shipworm is not just the home of the black slimy worm. Instead, it acts as the primary source of nourishment in a non-traditional way. K. polythalamia sifts mud and sediment with its gills. Most shipworms are relatively smaller and feed on rotten wood. This shipworm instead relies on a beneficial symbiotic bacteria living in its gills. The bacteria use the hydrogen sulfide for energy to produce organic compounds that in turn feed the shipworms, similar to the process of photosynthesis used by green plants to convert the carbon dioxide in the air into simple carbon compounds. Scientists found that K. polythalamia cooperates with different bacteria than other shipworms, which could be the reason why it evolved from consuming rotten wood to living on hydrogen sulfide in the mud. The internal organs of the shipworm have shrunk from lack of use over the course of its evolution. The scientists are planning to study the microbes found in the single gill of K. polythalamia to find a new possible antimicrobial substance.

== Habitat ==
Teredo navalis are a cosmopolitan species that can be found both in the Atlantic and Pacific oceans. Since they occupy wooden flotsam and natural driftwood such as dead tree trunks, they are spread as the wood is carried by currents. They also travel inside the wooden-hulled vessels that help increase their spread worldwide. However, the origin of T. navalis remains uncertain due to the widespread usage of ships in global trade and the resulting spreading of shipworms.

During the free-living larva stage, the species colonizes new habitats and spreads. Larvae are extremely sensitive to the presence of wood and will take advantage of any opportunity to attach to and penetrate wooden structures. In the Baltic Sea, free-floating piles carved by shipworms can be observed floating hundreds of kilometers away from the original wooden structures. The limiting element for propagation is salinity, which must be greater than 0.8% for successful reproduction. Consequently, freshwater is deadly to these invertebrates. Reproduction occurs during warm summer months, and the larvae mature for production in just eight weeks. Each year, several generations can be produced. Their ideal temperature range is 15 to 25 °C (60 to 75 °F) and therefore T. navalis can be found in temperate and tropical zones.

The shipworm lives in waters with oceanic salinity. Accordingly, it is rare in the brackish Baltic Sea, where wooden shipwrecks are preserved for much longer than in the oceans.

The range of various species has changed over time based on human activity. Many waters in developed countries that had been plagued by shipworms were cleared of them by pollution from the Industrial Revolution and the modern era; as environmental regulation led to cleaner waters, shipworms have returned. Climate change has also changed the range of species; some once found only in warmer and more salty waters like the Caribbean have established habitats in the Mediterranean.

== Cultural impact ==
Shipworms greatly damage wooden hulls and marine piling, and have been the subject of much study to find methods to avoid their attacks. Copper sheathing was used on wooden ships in the latter 18th century and afterwards, as a method of preventing damage by teredo worms. The first historically documented use of copper sheathing was experiments held by the British Royal Navy with HMS Alarm, which was coppered in 1761 and thoroughly inspected after a two-year cruise. In a letter from the Navy Board to the Admiralty dated 31 August 1763 it was written "that so long as copper plates can be kept upon the bottom, the planks will be thereby entirely secured from the effects of the worm."

In the Netherlands the shipworm caused a crisis in the 18th century by attacking the timber that faced the sea dike. After that the dikes had to be faced with stones. In 2009, Teredo caused several minor collapses along the Hudson River waterfront in Hoboken, New Jersey, due to damage to underwater pilings.

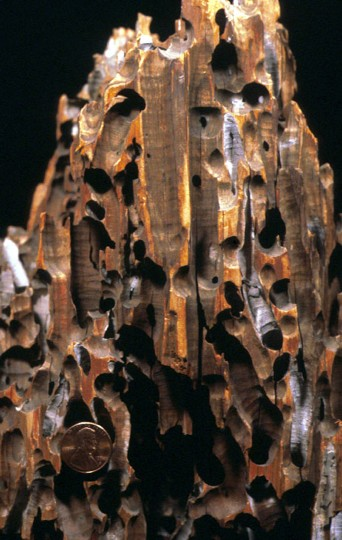
Teredolites borings in a modern wharf piling. The US one cent coin in the lower left of this image is 19 mm across.

In the early 19th century, engineer Marc Brunel observed that the shipworm's valves simultaneously enabled it to tunnel through wood and protected it from being crushed by the swelling timber. With that idea, he designed the first tunnelling shield, a modular iron tunnelling framework which enabled workers to tunnel through the unstable riverbed beneath the Thames. The Thames Tunnel was the first successful large tunnel built under a navigable river.

Henry David Thoreau's poem "Though All the Fates" pays homage to "New England's worm" which, in the poem, infests the hull of "[t]he vessel, though her masts be firm". In time, no matter what the ship carries or where she sails, the shipworm "her hulk shall bore, / [a]nd sink her in the Indian seas". The hull of the ship wrecked by a whale, inspiring Moby Dick, had been weakened by shipworms. In the Norse Saga of Erik the Red, Bjarni Grimolfsson, an Icelander, had his ship drift into the Irish Sea where it was eaten up by shipworms. He allowed half the crew to escape in a smaller boat covered in seal tar, while he stayed behind to drown with his men.

== Culinary use ==
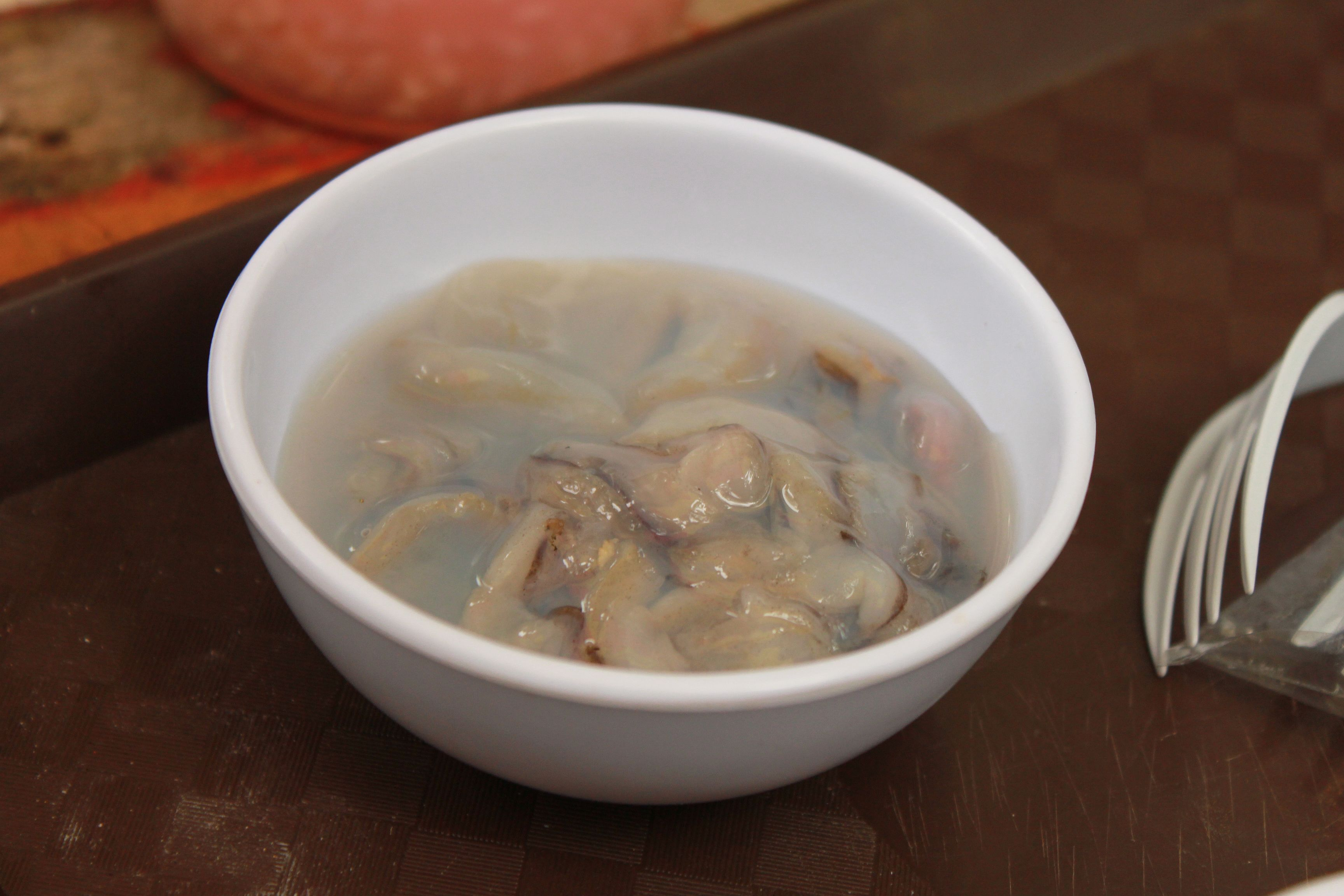
Shipworm as tamilok

In Palawan and Aklan in the Philippines, the shipworm is called Tamilok and is eaten as a delicacy. It is prepared as kinilaw—that is, raw (cleaned) but marinated with vinegar or lime juice, chopped chili peppers and onions, a process very similar to shrimp ceviche. Similarly, T. navalis can be found inside the dead and rotten trunk of mangroves in Indonesia's western Papua. To the local Kamoro tribe, it is referred to as tambelo and is considered as a delicacy in daily meals. It can be eaten fresh and raw (cleaned) or cooked (cleaned and boiled) as well and usually marinated with lime juice and chili peppers. Since T. navalis are related to clams, mussels, and oysters, the taste of the flesh has been compared to a wide variety of foods, from milk to oysters. Similarly, the delicacy is harvested, sold, and eaten from those taken by local natives in the mangrove forests of West Papua and some part of Borneo Island, Indonesia, and the central coastal peninsular regions of Thailand near Ko Phra Thong.

In Brazil, particularly in the states of Pará and Maranhão, species from the genera Teredo and Neoteredo are considered a delicacy. Considered an aphrodisiac, it is mostly eaten raw or in stews.

T. navalis grow faster than any other bivalve because it does not require much energy to create its small shell. They can grow to be about 30 cm (12 in) long in just six months. Mussels and oysters, on the other hand, with their much bigger shells, can take up to two years to reach harvestable size.

== See also ==
- Gribble
- Bug shoe
- Worm shoe
