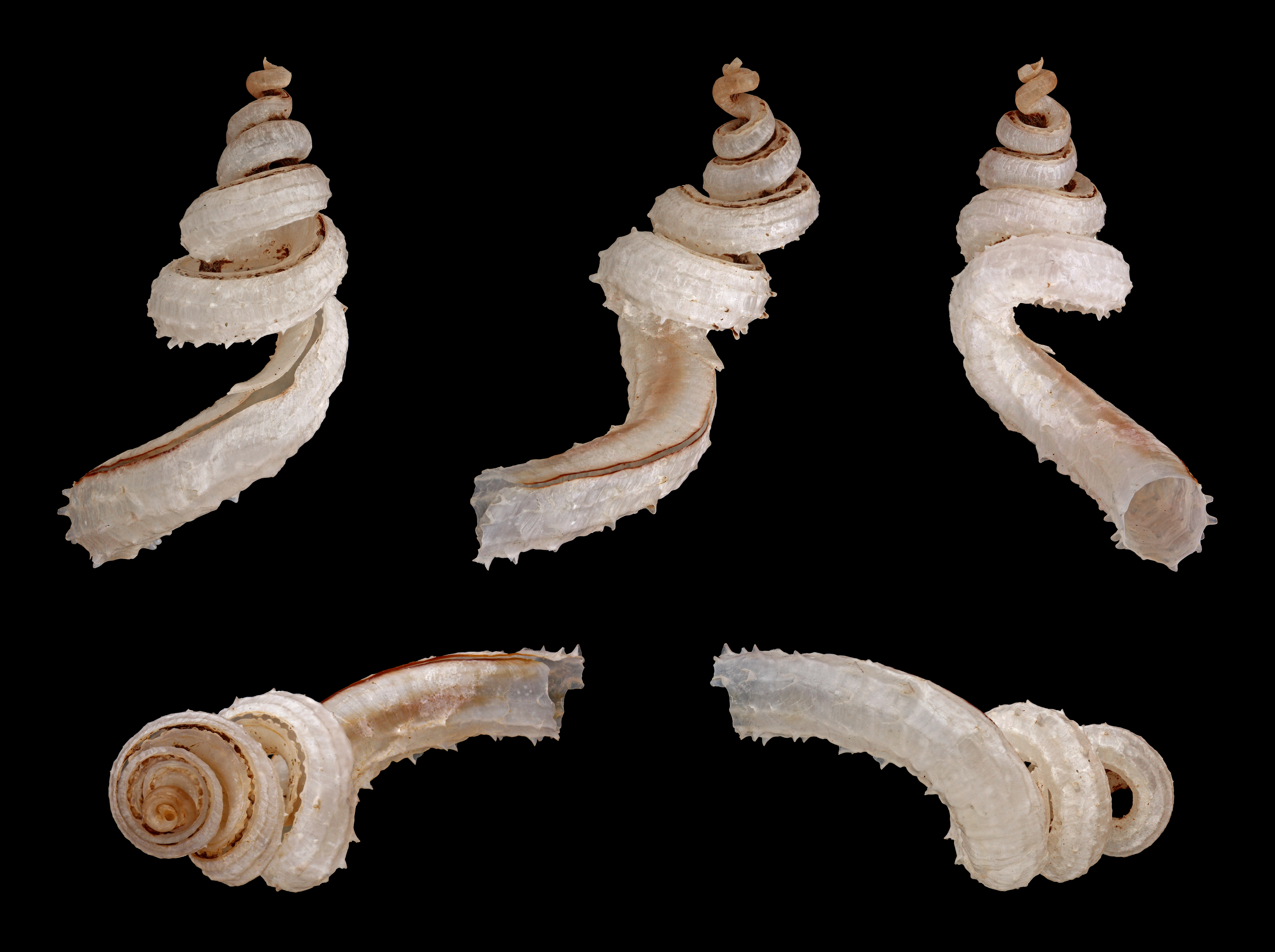
- Five view of a shell of Tenagodus anguinus

Scientific classification
- Kingdom: Animalia
- Phylum: Mollusca
- Class: Gastropoda
- Subclass: Caenogastropoda
- Order: incertae sedis
- Superfamily: Cerithioidea
- Family: Siliquariidae; Anton, 1838

Diversity
- About 40 extant species

= Siliquariidae =

Family of gastropods

Siliquariidae is a family of sea snails with unusual, very loosely coiled shells. These are marine gastropod molluscs in the superfamily Cerithioidea.

== Taxonomy ==
The following two subfamilies have been recognized in the taxonomy of Bouchet & Rocroi (2005):

- Siliquariinae Anton, 1838 - synonym: Tenagodidae Gill, 1871
- Stephopomatinae Bandel & Kowalke, 1997

== Genera ==
Genera within the family Siliquariidae include:

Siliquariinae

- Siliquaria Bruguière, 1789
- Tenagodus Guettard, 1770

Stephopomatinae

- Hummelinckiella Faber & Moolenbeek, 1999
- Stephopoma Mörch, 1860

subfamily ?

- Caporbis Bartsch, 1915
- Petalopoma Schiaparelli, 2002
