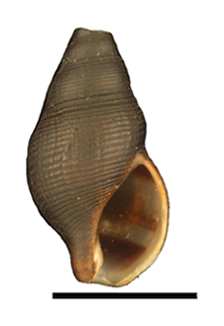
- Clea bockii shell

Scientific classification
- Kingdom: Animalia
- Phylum: Mollusca
- Class: Gastropoda
- Subclass: Caenogastropoda
- Order: Neogastropoda
- Family: Nassariidae
- Genus: Clea; A. Adams, 1855

Type species
- Clea nigricans A. Adams, 1855

Synonyms
- Quadrasia Crosse, 1886

= Clea (gastropod) =

Genus of gastropods

Clea is a genus of freshwater snails with opercula, aquatic gastropod mollusks in the subfamily Anentominae of the family Nassariidae, a family, almost all of the rest of which are marine.

== Name ==
The members of this genus are known as assassin snails for their habit of eating other snails. They bury themselves and ambush their prey.

== Taxonomy ==
This genus was originally described within the family Buccinidae. It was moved to family Nassariidae in 2016. It was classified in the newly established subfamily Anentominae within Nassariidae in 2017.

== Species ==
Species within the genus Clea include:

- Clea bangueyensis Smith, 1895
- Clea bockii Brot, 1881
- Clea funesta H. Adams, 1862
- Clea hidalgoi (Crosse, 1886)
- Clea nigricans A. Adams, 1855 - type species of the genus Clea

The following species are treated within the separate genus Anentome. Previously they were treated within the subgenus Anentome.

- Clea bizonata (Deshayes, 1876) - synonym of Anentome bizonata (Deshayes, 1876)
- Clea broti Deshayes, 1876
- Clea cambojiensis (Reeve, 1861) - synonym of Anentome cambojiensis (Reeve, 1861)
- Clea costulata (Schepman, 1885) - synonym of Anentome costulata (Schepman, 1885)
- Clea fusca (H. Adams, 1862) - synonym of Anentome fusca (H. Adams, 1862)
- Clea helena (von dem Busch, 1847) - synonym of Anentome helena (von dem Busch, 1847)
- Clea jullieni (Deshayes in Deshayes & Jullien, 1876) - synonym of Anentome jullieni (Deshayes, 1876)
- Clea paviei Morlet, 1866 - synonym of Anentome paviei (Morlet, 1866)
- Clea scalarina (Deshayes in Deshayes & Jullien, 1876) - synonym of Anentome scalarina (Deshayes, 1876)
- Clea spinosa Temcharoen, 1971 - synonym of Anentome spinosa (Temcharoen, 1971)
- Clea wykoffi Brandt, 1974- synonym of Anentome wykoffi (Brandt, 1974)

Synonyms:

- Clea annesleyi Benson, 1861 is a synonym of Nassodonta annesleyi (Benson, 1861)

== Distribution ==
This genus occurs in Asia and Africa.

== Reproduction ==
Clea consists of defined male and female genders and is not capable of gender change. It is unknown as to how to sex these animals. Both males and females seem to be the same size and shape. When a male and female mate, they lock together for 8–12 hours.

== Feeding habits ==
Like all snails in the clade Neogastropoda, snails in this genus are carnivorous. They feed on different types of worms and gastropods, often eating other, larger snails after burying themselves and ambushing their prey.

== Human use ==
Some members of this genus is a part of ornamental pet trade for freshwater aquaria.
