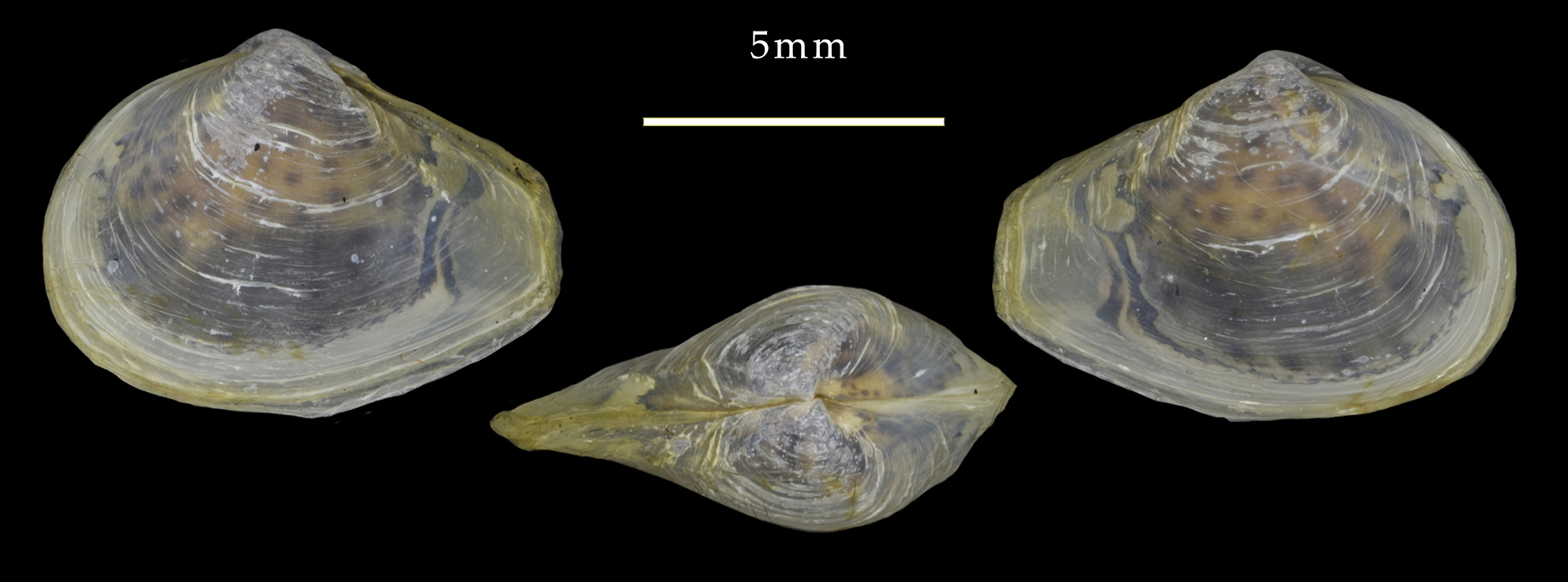

Scientific classification
- Kingdom: Animalia
- Phylum: Mollusca
- Class: Bivalvia
- Order: Myida
- Family: Myidae
- Genus: Indosphenia
- Species: I. kayalum

Binomial name
- Indosphenia kayalum Oliver, Hallan & Jayachandran, 2018

= Indosphenia kayalum =

Species of bivalve

Indosphenia kayalum is a small bivalve species inhabiting fragmented brackish-water habitats around Kochi backwater, Kerala. The specific name kayalum is derived from kayal, the Malayalam name for these backwaters. This species was described in 2018 from the Ezhupunna region of Cochin Backwater, Vembanad Lake along with other myid clam Mytilopsis and brackish water gastropod Nassodonta insignis. This is the fifth species described in the genus Indosphenia. The other species recognized under this genus are Indosphenia cochinensis, Indosphenia abbreviata, Indosphenia abbreviata chilkaensis and Indosphenia sowerbyi.
