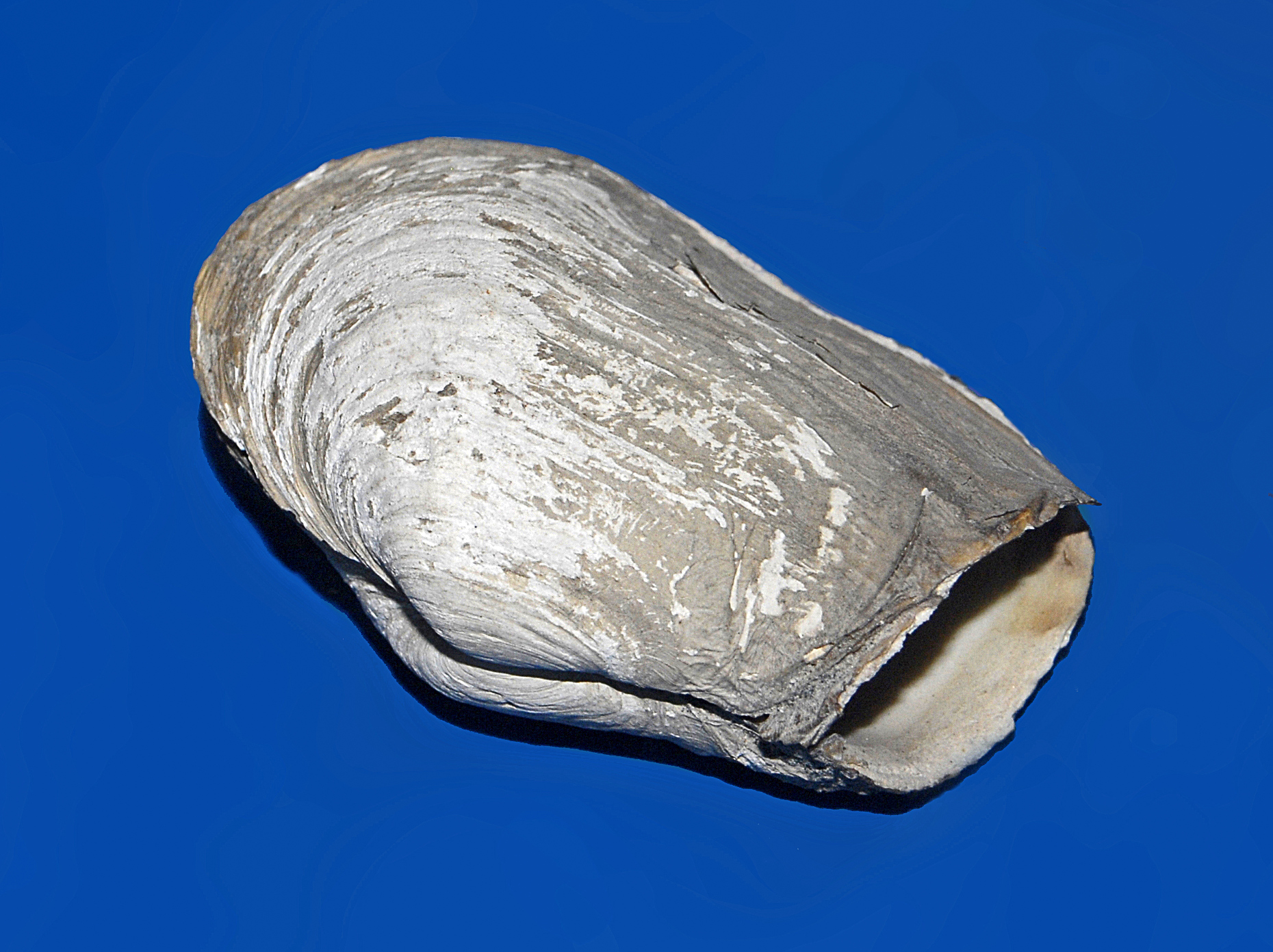
- Shell of Mya truncata, on display at the Museo Civico di Storia Naturale di Milano

Scientific classification
- Kingdom: Animalia
- Phylum: Mollusca
- Class: Bivalvia
- Order: Myida
- Superfamily: Myoidea
- Family: Myidae
- Genus: Mya
- Species: M. truncata

Binomial name
- Mya truncata Linnaeus, 1758

Synonyms
- Mya ovalis Turton, 1822; Sphenia swainsoni Turton, 1822; Mya uddevalensis Hancock, 1846

= Mya truncata =

Species of bivalve

Mya truncata, common name the blunt gaper or truncate softshell, is a species of edible saltwater clam, a marine bivalve mollusk in the family Myidae.

== Description ==
Shells of Mya truncata can reach a size of about 2.5–7.5 centimetres (0.98–2.95 in). These bivalves are similar to the soft-shell clams (Mya arenaria), but usually they are smaller. Moreover, their shells are less elongated.

Valves are rounded in the anterior end and truncated in the posterior end, with a large gape allowing the passage of an extensible siphon that can reach four times the length of the shell. The siphon can be retracted completely into the shell. The two valves are triangular and convex, but the right valve is more convex than the left one. The siphon is protected by a horny sheath and it is provided with small tentacles at its end.

The outer surface of the valves is covered with concentric growth lines. It is whitish, while the outermost layer of the valves (periostracum) may be yellowish, light olive or dark brown. The hinge of the left valve shows a spoon-shaped projection, to which the ligaments are attached. The pallial sinus is deep and broad.

Right and left valve of the same specimen:

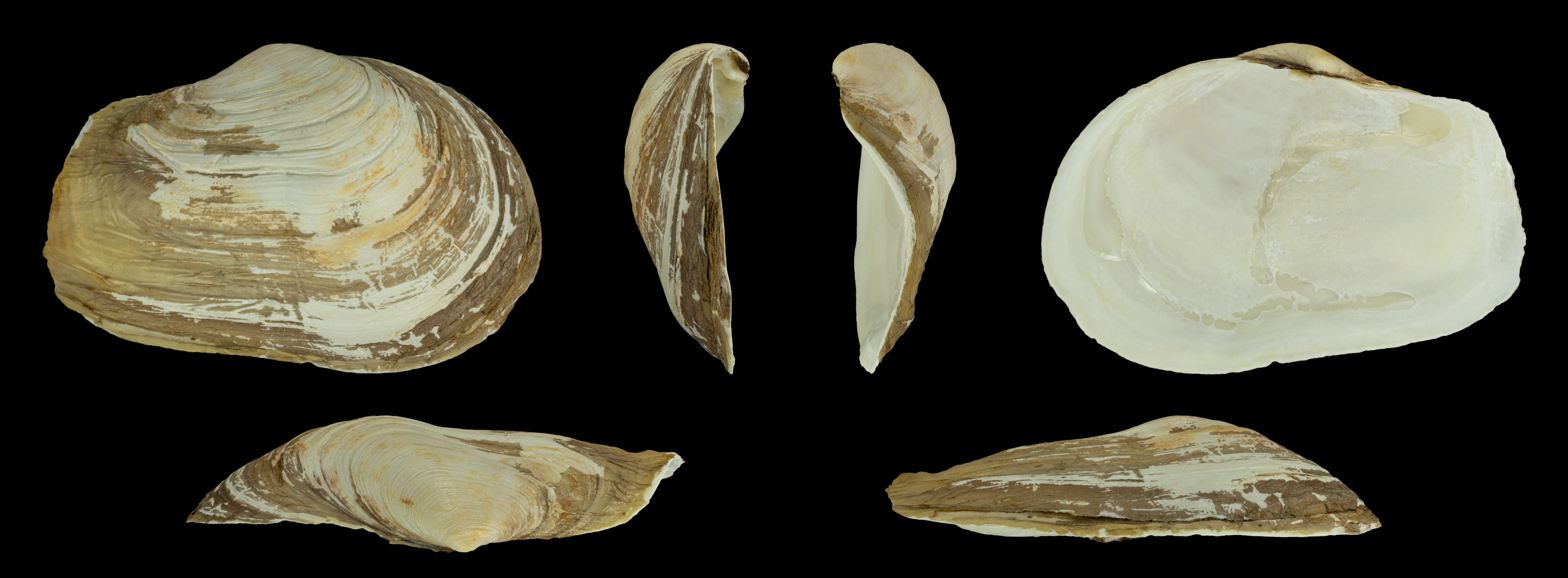
Right valve

Left valve

== Biology ==
Reproduction is sexual, the gametes of both sexes being expelled into the water, then the free larvae attach themselves to rocks. These clams filter the sea water in order to feed on bacteria, diatoms and larvae of invertebrates. In some years, the reproductive cycle fails completely.

These clams are the main food of the walrusses (Odobenus rosmarus). They feed on these clams by raking the mud with their tusks and sieving out the clams.

== Distribution and habitat ==
This species is widespread over the Arctic seas and extends to the Bay of Biscay, to the West Atlantic coast and to Sakhalin on the Pacific coast. It has been reported also in the waters around Japan. Mya truncata lives from the lower shore up to depths of 70 m, burrowed in sand or sandy mud.

== Gallery ==
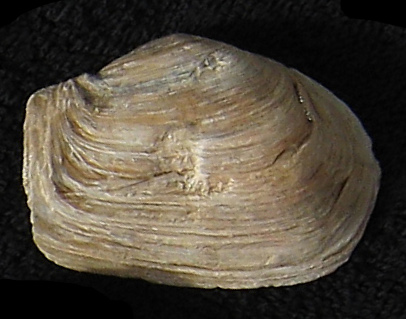
Shell of Mya truncata from North Wales

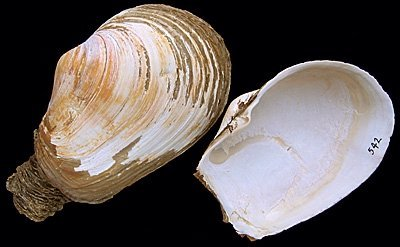
Whole animal and left valve of the shell, from the North Sea

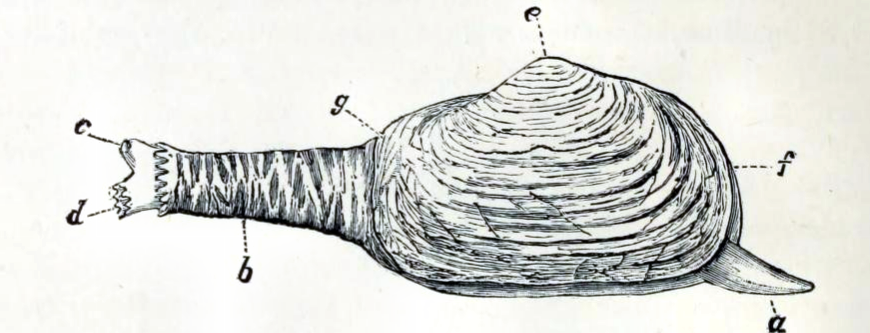
Mya truncata : a) foot b) siphon sheath c) exhalant siphon d) inhalant siphon e) umbones or beaks f) anterior g) posterior end of the shell

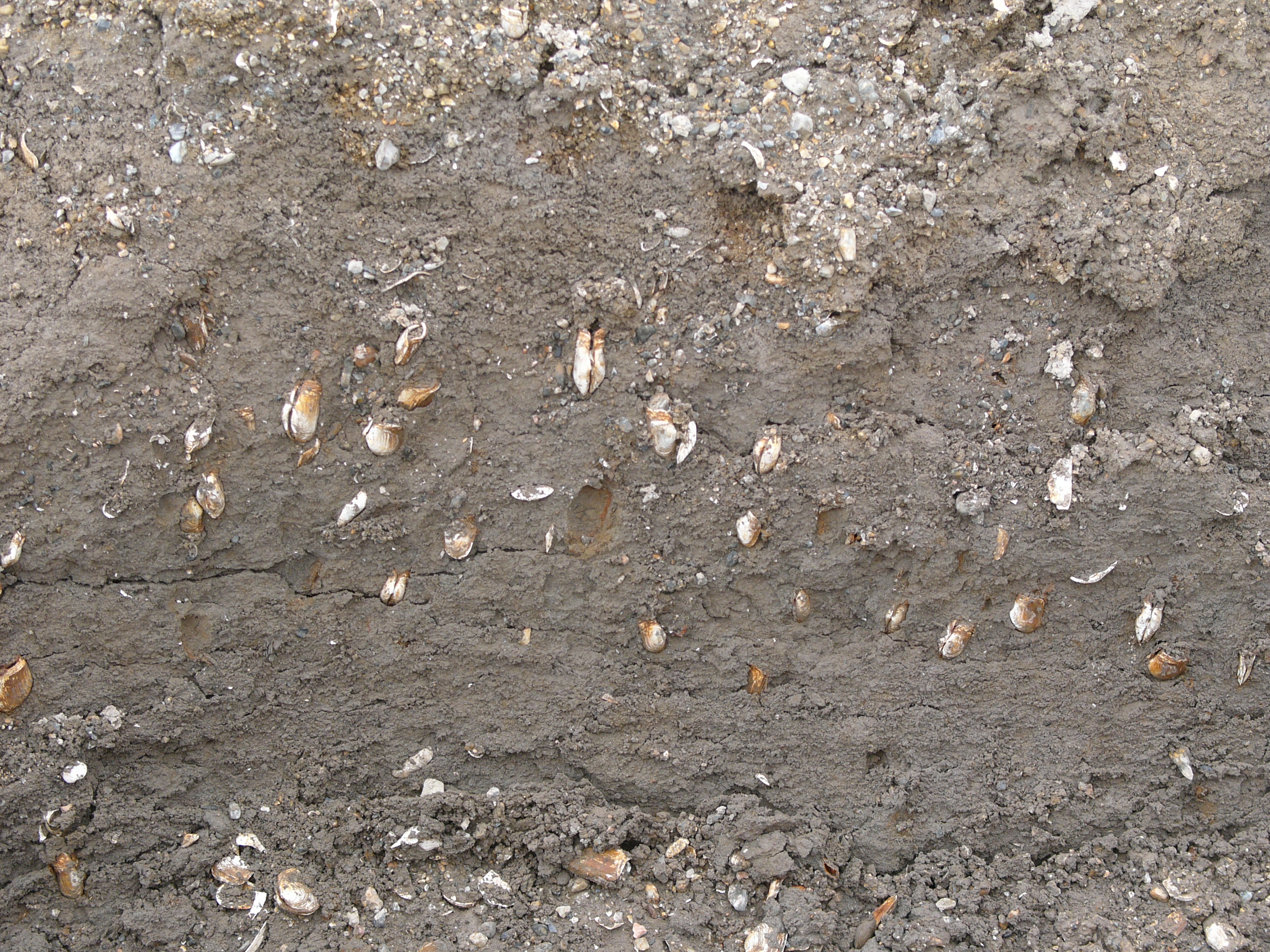
Shells of Mya truncata in subrecent sediments on the coast of Spitsbergen.

== Bibliography ==
- Clay, E., 1966. Literature survey of the common fauna of estuaries. 12. Mya arenaria L., Mya truncata L. Imperial Chemical Industries Limited, Brixham Laboratory, BL/A/707.
- Fish, J.D. & Fish, S., 1996. A student's guide to the seashore. Second edition. Cambridge: Cambridge University Press.
- Hayward, P., Nelson-Smith, T. & Shields, C. 1996. Collins pocket guide. Sea shore of Britain and northern Europe. London: HarperCollins.
- Hayward, P.J. & Ryland, J.S. (ed.) 1995b. Handbook of the marine fauna of North-West Europe. Oxford: Oxford University Press.
- Tebble, N., 1976. British Bivalve Seashells. A Handbook for Identification, 2nd ed. Edinburgh: British Museum (Natural History), Her Majesty's Majesty's Stationery Office.
- Guido Poppe and Yoshihiro Goto: European Seashells Volume 2 (Scaphopoda, Bivalvia, Cephalopoda). 221 S., Verlag Christa Hemmen, Wiesbaden 1993 (2000 unv. Nachdruck) ISBN 3925919104
- Linnaeus, C. (1758). Systema Naturae per regna tria naturae, secundum classes, ordines, genera, species, cum characteribus, differentiis, synonymis, locis. Editio decima, reformata. Laurentius Salvius: Holmiae. ii, 824 pp
- Rainer Willmann: Muscheln der Nord- und Ostsee. 310 S., Neumann-Neudamm, Melsungen 1989, ISBN 3-7888-0555-2
- Teresa Amaro, Gerard Duineveld und Paul Tyler: Does Mya truncata reproduce at its southern distribution limit? Preliminary information. Journal of Shellfish Research, 24: 24-28, New Orleans, ISSN 0730-8000
- Turgeon, D. D., J. F. Quinn, Jr., A. E. Bogan, E. V. Coan, F. G. Hochberg, W. G. Lyons, et al. (1998) Common and scientific names of aquatic invertebrates from the United States and Canada: Mollusks, 2nd ed., American Fisheries Society Special Publication 26
