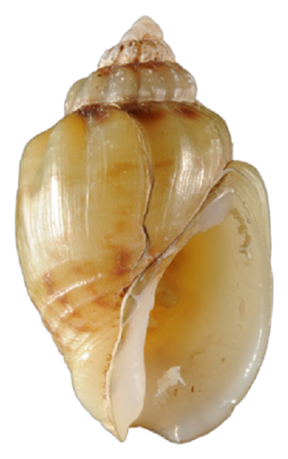
- Oligohalinophila dorri shell

Scientific classification
- Kingdom: Animalia
- Phylum: Mollusca
- Class: Gastropoda
- Subclass: Caenogastropoda
- Order: Neogastropoda
- Family: Nassariidae
- Genus: Oligohalinophila
- Species: O. dorri

Binomial name
- Oligohalinophila dorri (Wattebled, 1886)

Synonyms
- Canidia dorri Wattebled, 1886; Nassodonta dorri (Wattebled, 1886)

= Oligohalinophila dorri =

Species of gastropod

Oligohalinophila dorri is a species of brackish water snail, with gills and an operculum, a gastropod mollusc in the family Nassariidae, the nassa mud snails or dog whelks.

== Taxonomy ==
This species was described under the name Canidia dorri by Gustave-Éduard Joseph Wattebled in 1886. Two syntypes are stored in National Museum of Natural History in Paris. The specific name dorri is in honour of captain Émile Dorr (1857–1907) who collected type specimens in North Central Coast region of nowadays Vietnam.

This species was not reported since 1886 until 2001. Kantor & Kilburn (2001) reported on the rediscovery of Nassodonta dorri, described the shell, radula and provided some preliminary anatomical observations based on a single, poorly preserved female, and discussed the family placement of the genus. They also moved this species to the genus Nassodonta within Nassariidae. There was Nassodonta insignis as the only species within the genus Nassodonta.

Simone (2007) provided a description of the external anatomy, proboscis musculature and radula, based on semi-mummified specimens.

Strong et al. provided anatomical and molecular phylogeny analysis and placed it into the newly established subfamily Anentominae and they confirmed the placement of this species within family Nassariidae.

In 2019 Neiber M.T. & Glaubrecht M. moved this species to a new genus Oligohalinophila in the subfamily Anentominae.

== Distribution ==
Distribution of Oligohalinophila dorri include Vietnam: lagune de Kao-hai near Huế, Thừa Thiên-Huế Province, Central Vietnam and Phan Ri River, Bình Thuận Province, Southeast Vietnam. It was also reported as abundant species from Nha Trang, Khánh Hòa Province in South Central Coast and from Phan Rang–Tháp Chàm, Ninh Thuận Province.

The type locality is lagune de Kao-hai near Huế.

== Description ==
The shell is thick. The shape of the shell is oblong-ovate. The shell has 2.25 distinctly shouldered whorls. The spire is low and obtuse. The body whorl is subcyrindrical. The width of the shell is 8.0-9.6 mm. Shell length is 12.0-14.9 mm.

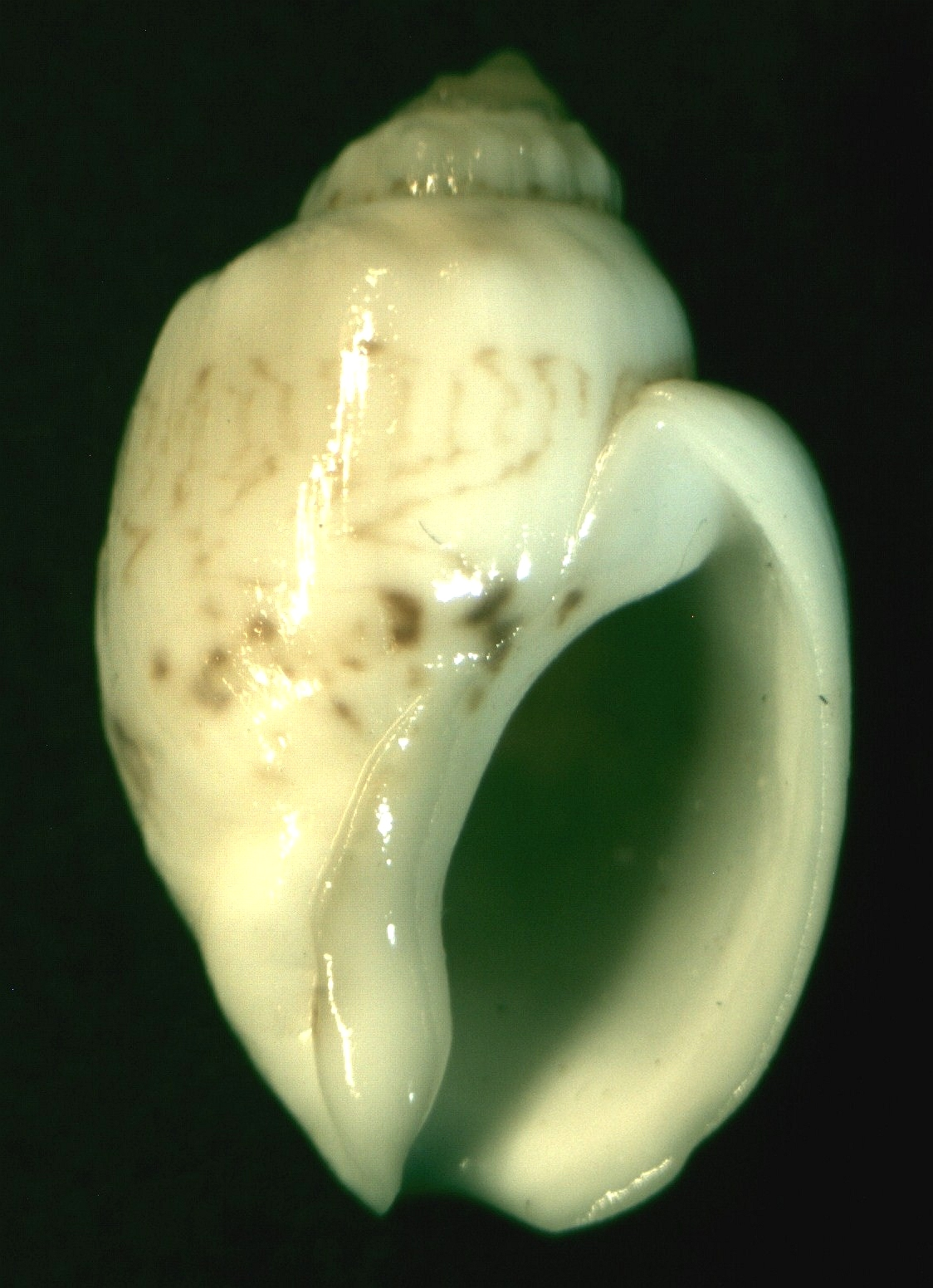
Apertural view of a shell of Oligohalinophila dorri.

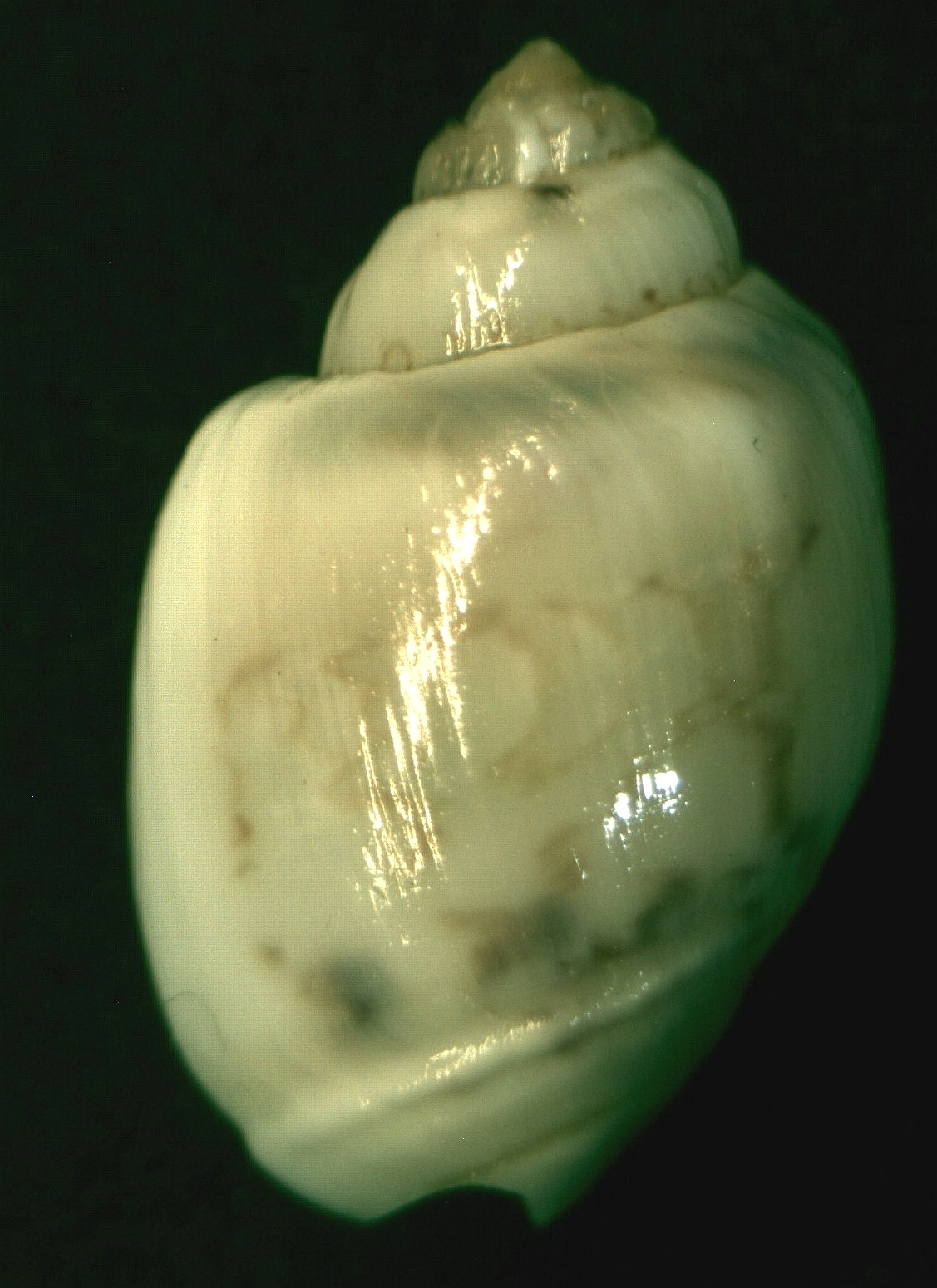
Abapertural view of a shell of Oligohalinophila dorri.

Operculum is thin, elongate, oval with basal nucleus. The length of the operculum is 5.7 mm.

Head is small and broad, with very short, thick cephalic tentacles. Eyes are slightly elevated on prominent ocular peduncles at tentacle outer bases. Foot is broad, fleshy, overlapping sides of operculum in preserved specimens. Frontal part of the foot (propodium) is narrow with posterior extent marked by indistinct notch, poorly demarcated from mesopodium. There is shallow propodial pedal gland along anterior edge, with two histologically distinct subepithelial gland cells. Metapodium has no posterior tentacles.

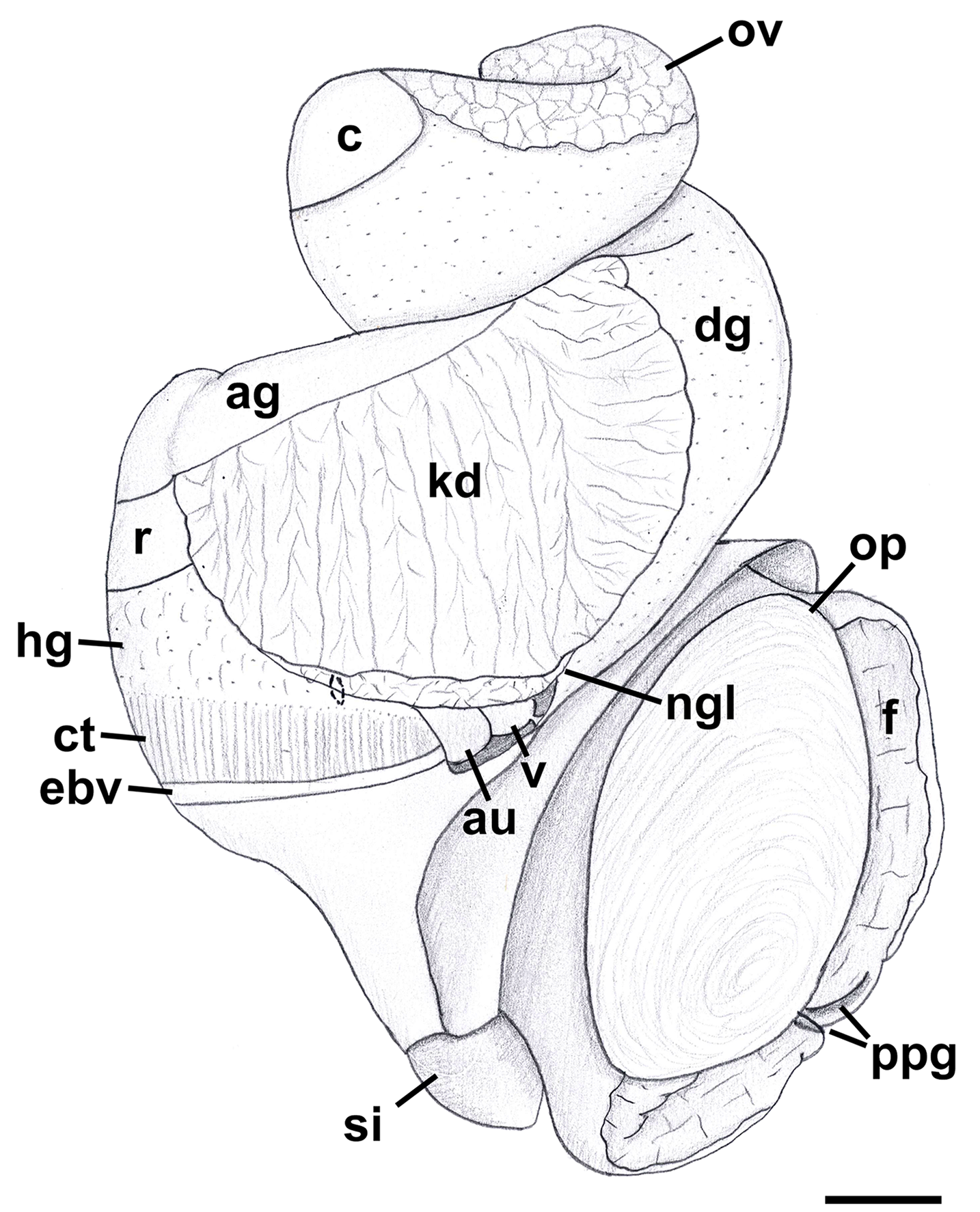
Apertural view of anatomy of Oligohalinophila dorri. ag, albumen gland; au, auricle; c, caecum; ct, ctenidium; dg, digestive gland; ebv, efferent branchial vein; f, foot; hg, hypobranchial gland; kd, kidney; ngl, nephridial gland; op, operculum; ov, ovary; ppg, propodial pedal gland; r, rectum; si, siphon; v, ventricle.

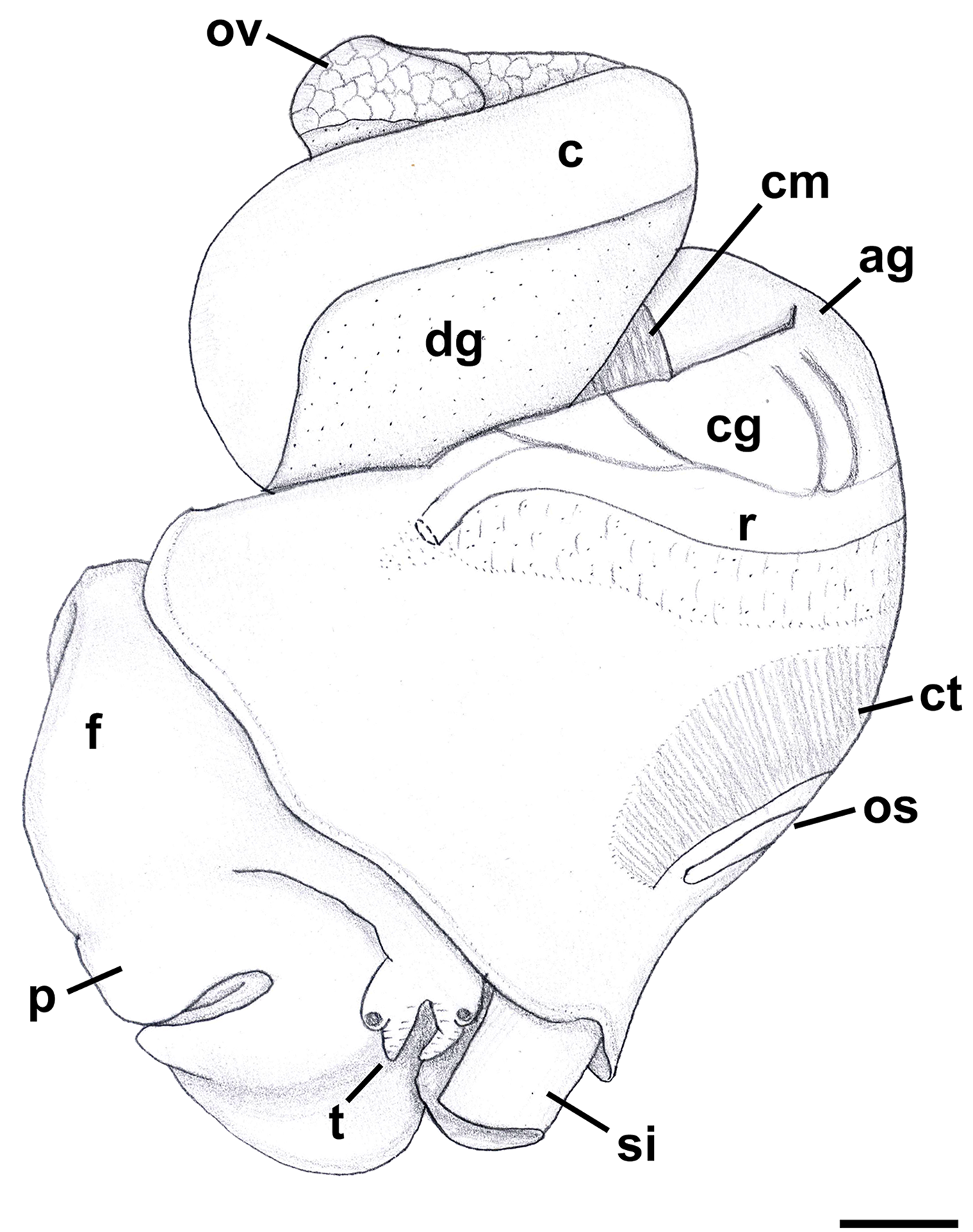
Abapertural view of anatomy of Oligohalinophila dorri. ov, ovary; c, caecum; dg, digestive gland; cm, columellar muscle; ag, albumen gland; cg, capsule gland; r, rectum; ct, ctenidium; os, osphradium; f, foot; p, propodium; t, cephalic tentacle; si, siphon.

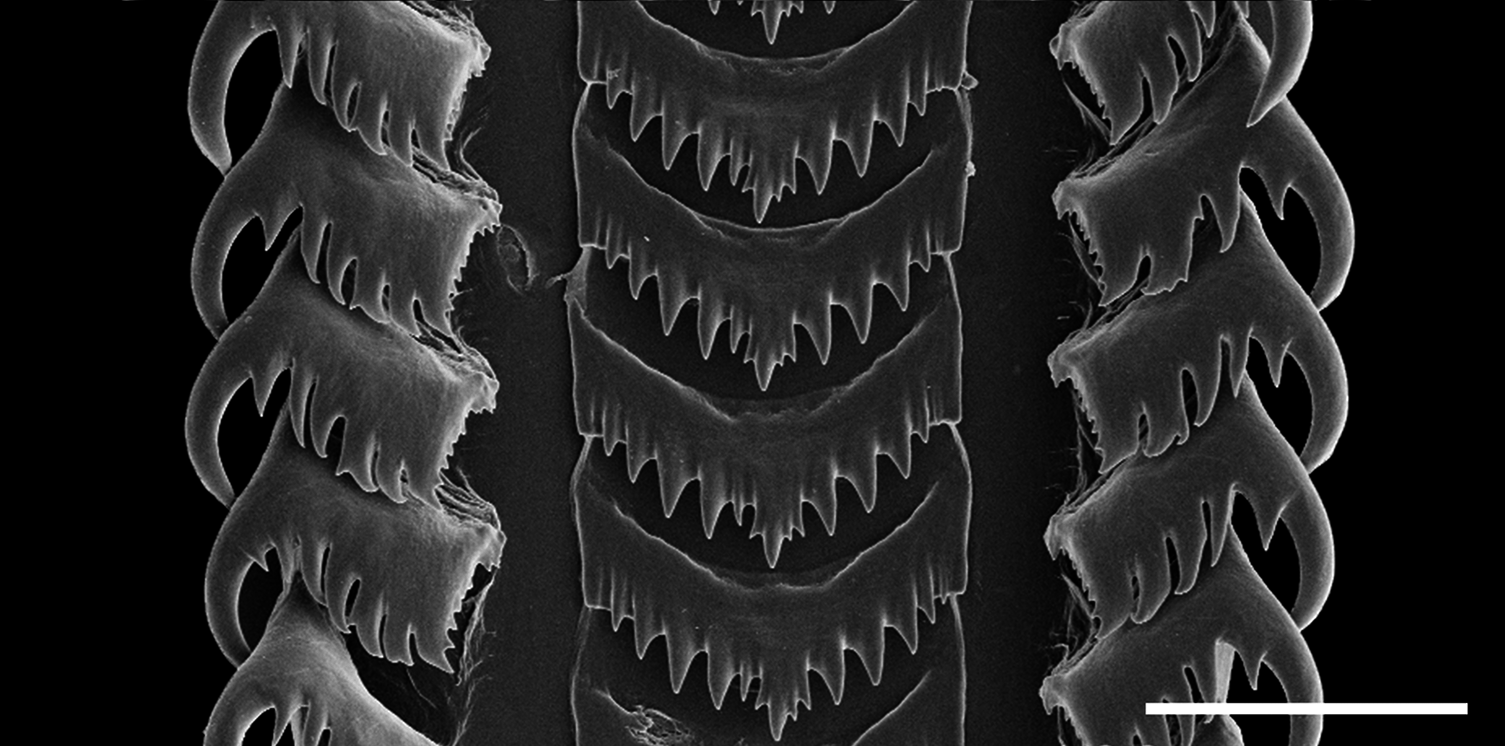
SEM photo of radula of Oligohalinophila dorri. Scale bar is 100 μm.

Mantle cavity is short, less than one-half whorl in length. There is reno-pericardial complex just behind the mantle cavity. Mantle cavity is slightly asymmetrical, slightly deeper at left side in front of pericardium.

Reproductive system: has separate sexes (i.e. these snails are dioecious).

Females: ovipositor is forming deep, simple pore surrounded by weakly developed subepithelial glands.

== Ecology ==
Oligohalinophila dorri live in lower parts of rivers. Reported depth is about 3 m. This species lives in turbid brackish waters and is capable of withstanding a wide range of salinities.
