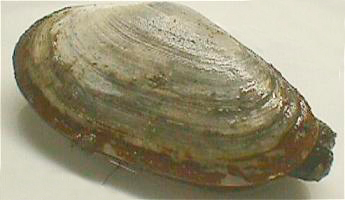
- The soft-shell clam, Mya arenaria

Scientific classification
- Kingdom: Animalia
- Phylum: Mollusca
- Class: Bivalvia
- Order: Myida
- Superfamily: Myoidea
- Family: Myidae; Lamarck, 1809

Genera
- See text

= Myidae =

Family of bivalves

Myidae, common name the softshell clams, is a taxonomic family of marine bivalve molluscs in the order Myida.

== Genera ==
Genera within the family Myidae include:

- Cryptomya (Conrad, 1848)
  - Cryptomya californica (Conrad, 1837) – California softshell
- Indosphenia (Oliver, Hallan & Jayachandran, 2018)
  - Indosphenia kayalum (Oliver, Hallan & Jayachandran, 2018)
- Mya Linnaeus, 1758
  - Mya arenaria Linnaeus, 1758 – soft-shell clam
  - Mya baxteri Coan and Scott, 1997
  - Mya elegans (Eichwald, 1871)
  - Mya japonica Jay, 1856
  - Mya priapus (Tilesius, 1822)
  - Mya profundior Grant and Gale, 1931
  - Mya pseudoarenaria Schlesch, 1931
  - Mya truncata Linnaeus, 1758
  - Mya uzenensis Nomura and Zimbo, 1937
- Paramya Conrad, 1860
  - Paramya subovata (Conrad, 1845)
- Platyodon
  - Platyodon cancellatus (Conrad, 1837) – boring softshell
- Sphenia Turton, 1822
  - Sphenia antillensis Dall and Simpson, 1901
  - Sphenia binghami Turton, 1822
  - Sphenia luticola (Valenciennes, 1846)
  - Sphenia ovoidea Carpenter, 1864
  - Sphenia sincera Hanks and Packer, 1985
  - Sphenia tumida J. E. Lewis, 1968
