= Clea funesta =

Scientific classification
- Kingdom: Animalia
- Phylum: Mollusca
- Class: Gastropoda
- Subclass: Caenogastropoda
- Order: Neogastropoda
- Family: Nassariidae
- Genus: Clea
- Species: C. funesta

Binomial name
- Clea funesta H. Adams, 1862

Species of gastropod

Clea funesta is a species of freshwater snail with an operculum, an aquatic gastropod mollusk in the family Buccinidae, the true whelks, most of which are marine.
