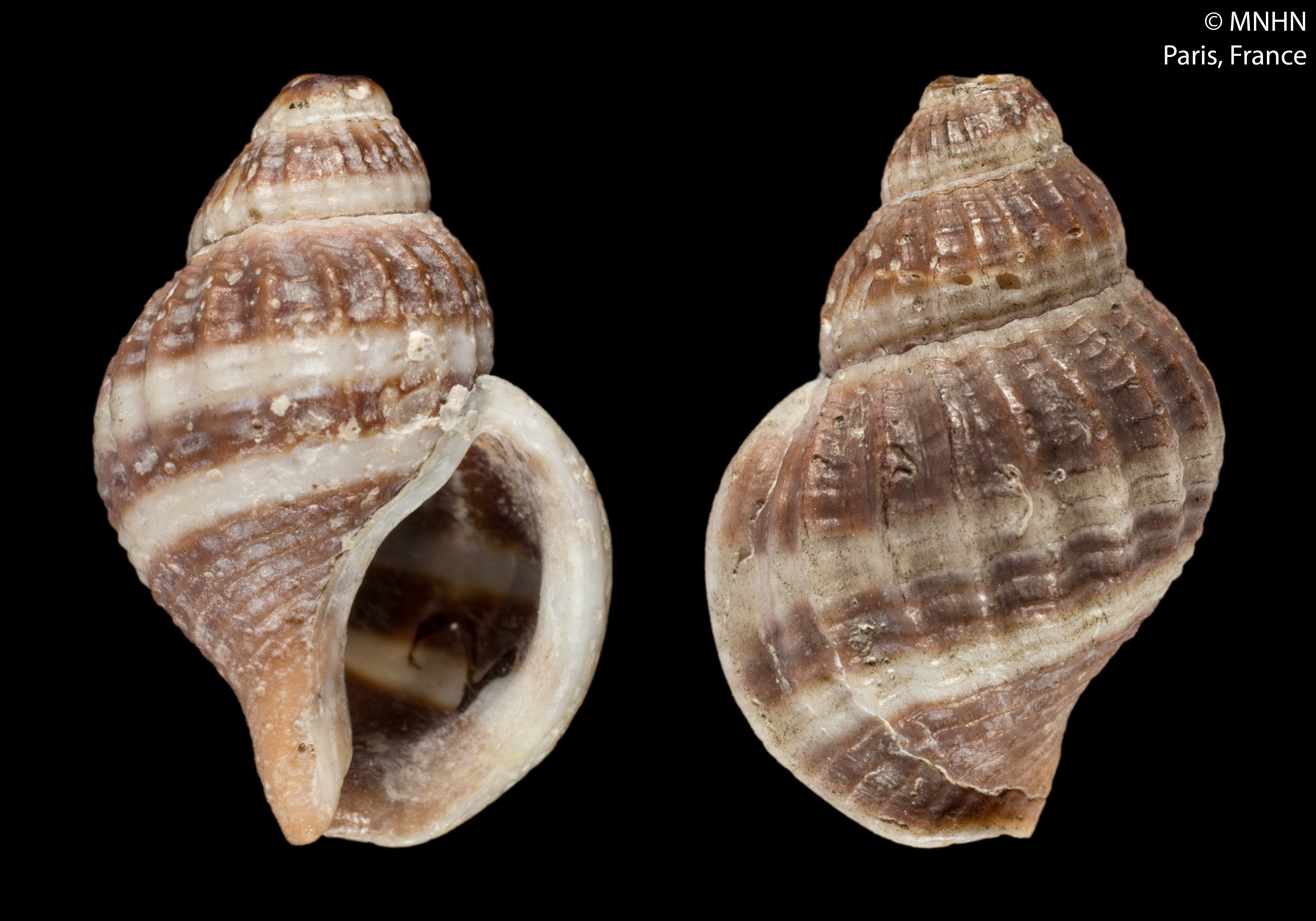
- Shell of Anentome bizonata (syntype at MNHN, Paris)

Scientific classification
- Kingdom: Animalia
- Phylum: Mollusca
- Class: Gastropoda
- Subclass: Caenogastropoda
- Order: Neogastropoda
- Superfamily: Buccinoidea
- Family: Nassariidae
- Subfamily: Anentominae
- Genus: Anentome; Cossmann, 1901

Type species
- Melania helena von dem Busch, 1847

Species
- See text

Synonyms
- Canidia H. Adams, 1862 (invalid: junior homonym of Canidia J. Thomson, 1857 [Coleoptera]; Anentome is a replacement name); Clea (Anentome) Cossmann, 1901

= Anentome =

Genus of gastropods

Anentome is a genus of freshwater snails with opercula, aquatic gastropod mollusks in the subfamily Anentominae of the family Nassariidae, a family, almost all of the rest of which are marine.

== Species ==
Species within the genus Anentome include:

- Anentome bizonata (Deshayes, 1876)
- Anentome cambojiensis (Reeve, 1861)
- Anentome costulata (Schepman, 1885)
- Anentome fusca (H. Adams, 1862)
- Anentome helena (von dem Busch, 1847)
- Anentome jullieni (Deshayes, 1876)
- Anentome paviei (Morlet, 1866)
- Anentome scalarina (Deshayes, 1876)
- Anentome spinosa (Temcharoen, 1971)
- Anentome wykoffi (Brandt, 1974)
