= Anentome jullieni =

Conservation status
- Data Deficient (IUCN 3.1)

Scientific classification
- Kingdom: Animalia
- Phylum: Mollusca
- Class: Gastropoda
- Subclass: Caenogastropoda
- Order: Neogastropoda
- Family: Nassariidae
- Genus: Anentome
- Species: A. jullieni

Binomial name
- Anentome jullieni (Deshayes in Deshayes & Jullien, 1876)

Synonyms
- Canidia broti Deshayes, 1876; Canidia jullieni Deshayes, 1876; Clea (Anentome) jullieni (Deshayes, 1876); Clea jullieni (Deshayes, 1876)

Species of gastropod

Anentome jullieni is a Southeast Asian species of freshwater snail with an operculum, an aquatic gastropod mollusk in the subfamily Anentominae of the family Nassariidae.

== Distribution ==
Anentome jullieni occurs in a small stretch of the Mekong River between Bandan (Ban Dan Ky) and Sambor (Kaoh Sambor) in Cambodia.

== Feeding habits ==
Like all snails in the clade Neogastropoda, this species is carnivorous. It feeds on different types of worms and gastropods, often eating other, larger snails after burying themselves and ambushing their prey.

== Reproduction ==
Anentome jullieni consists of defined male and female genders, and is not capable of gender change. It is unknown as to how to sex these animals. Both males and females seem to be the same size and shape. When a male and female mate, they lock together for 8–12 hours.
