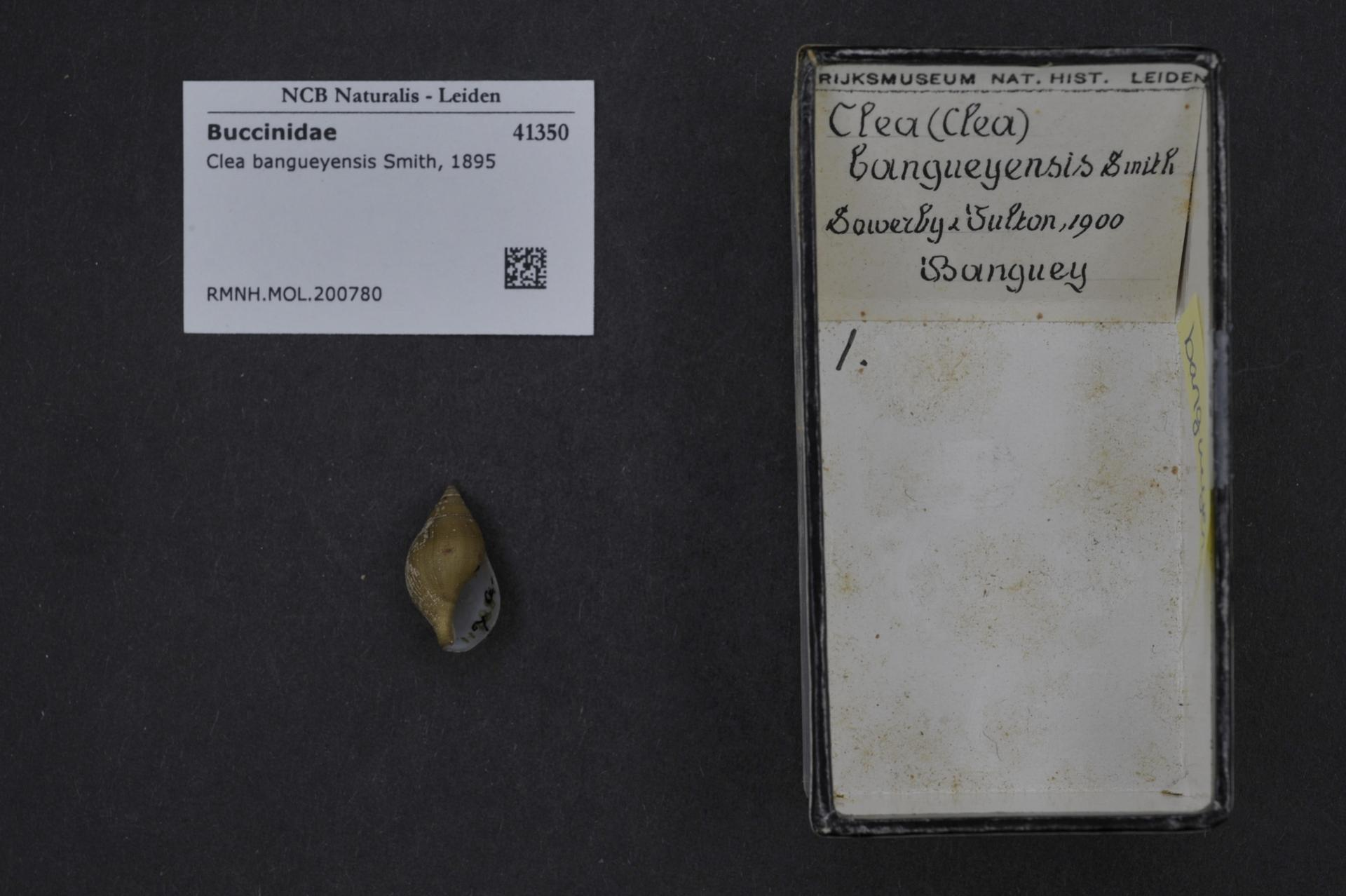
- Clea bangueyensis shell

Scientific classification
- Kingdom: Animalia
- Phylum: Mollusca
- Class: Gastropoda
- Subclass: Caenogastropoda
- Order: Neogastropoda
- Family: Nassariidae
- Genus: Clea
- Species: C. bangueyensis

Binomial name
- Clea bangueyensis Smith, 1895

= Clea bangueyensis =

Species of gastropod

Clea bangueyensis is a species of freshwater snail with an operculum, an aquatic gastropod mollusk in the family Buccinidae, the true whelks, most of which are marine.

== Feeding habits ==
Like all snails in the clade Neogastropoda, this species is carnivorous. It feeds on different types of worm and gastropods. These predatory snails often attack and eat other, larger snails by burying themselves and then ambushing their prey.

== Reproduction ==
Clea bangueyensis consists of defined male and female genders, and are not capable of gender change. It is unknown as to how to sex these animals. Both male and female seem to be the same size and shape. When a male and female mate, they lock together for eight to twelve hours.
