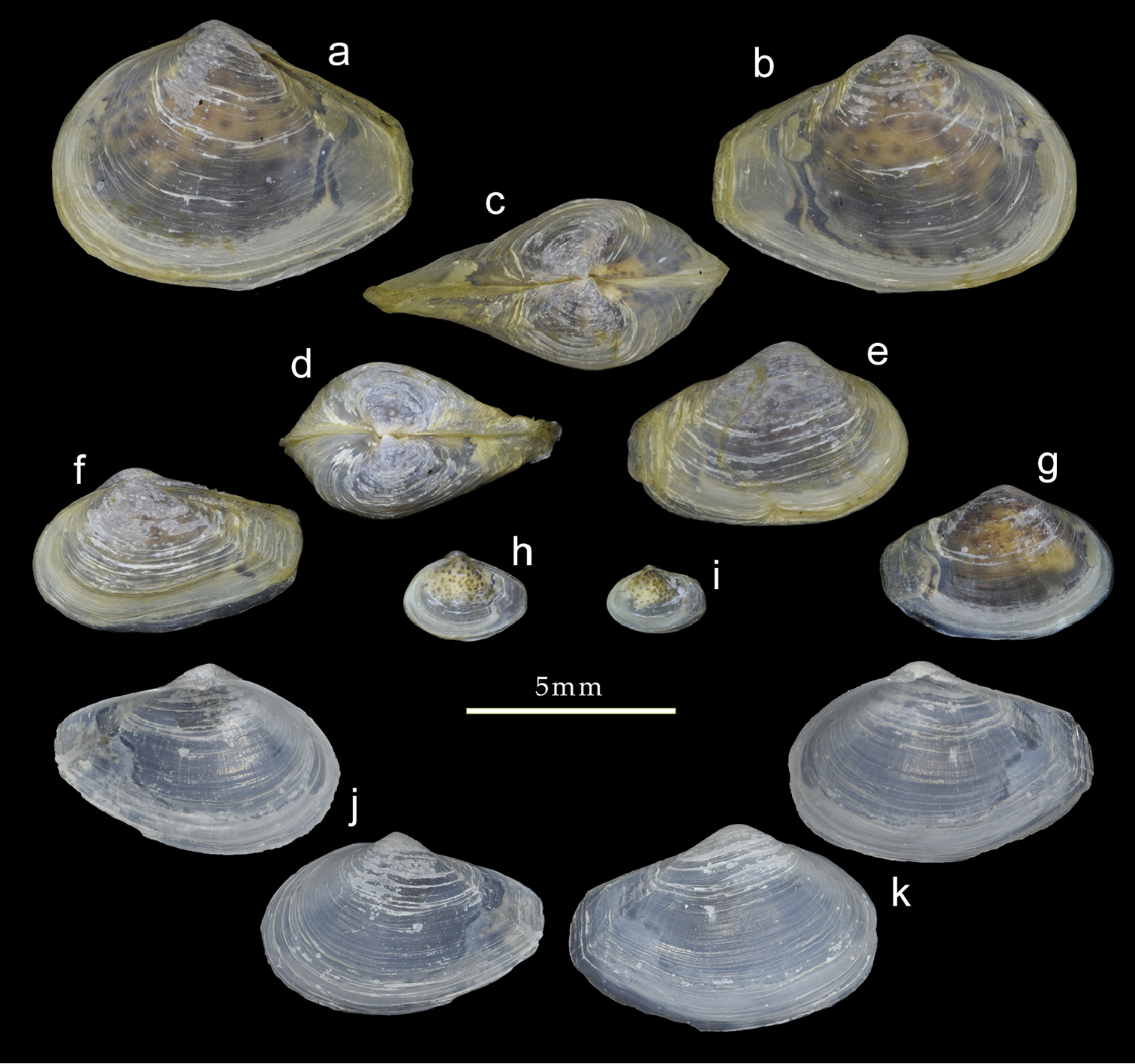
- Indosphenia kayalum

Scientific classification
- Domain: Eukaryota
- Kingdom: Animalia
- Phylum: Mollusca
- Class: Bivalvia
- Order: Myida
- Family: Myidae
- Genus: Indosphenia; Oliver, Hallan & Jayachandran, 2018

= Indosphenia =

Genus of bivalves

Indosphenia is a genus of bivalves belonging to the family Myidae. This genus is mainly distributed in the fragmented brackish water habitats of India including Chilka Lake and Cochin (kochi) backwaters.

Species:

- Indosphenia abbreviata (Preston, 1907)
- Indosphenia cochinensis (Preston, 1916)
- Indosphenia kayalum Oliver, Hallan & Jayachandran, 2018
- Indosphenia sowerbyi (Smith, 1893)
