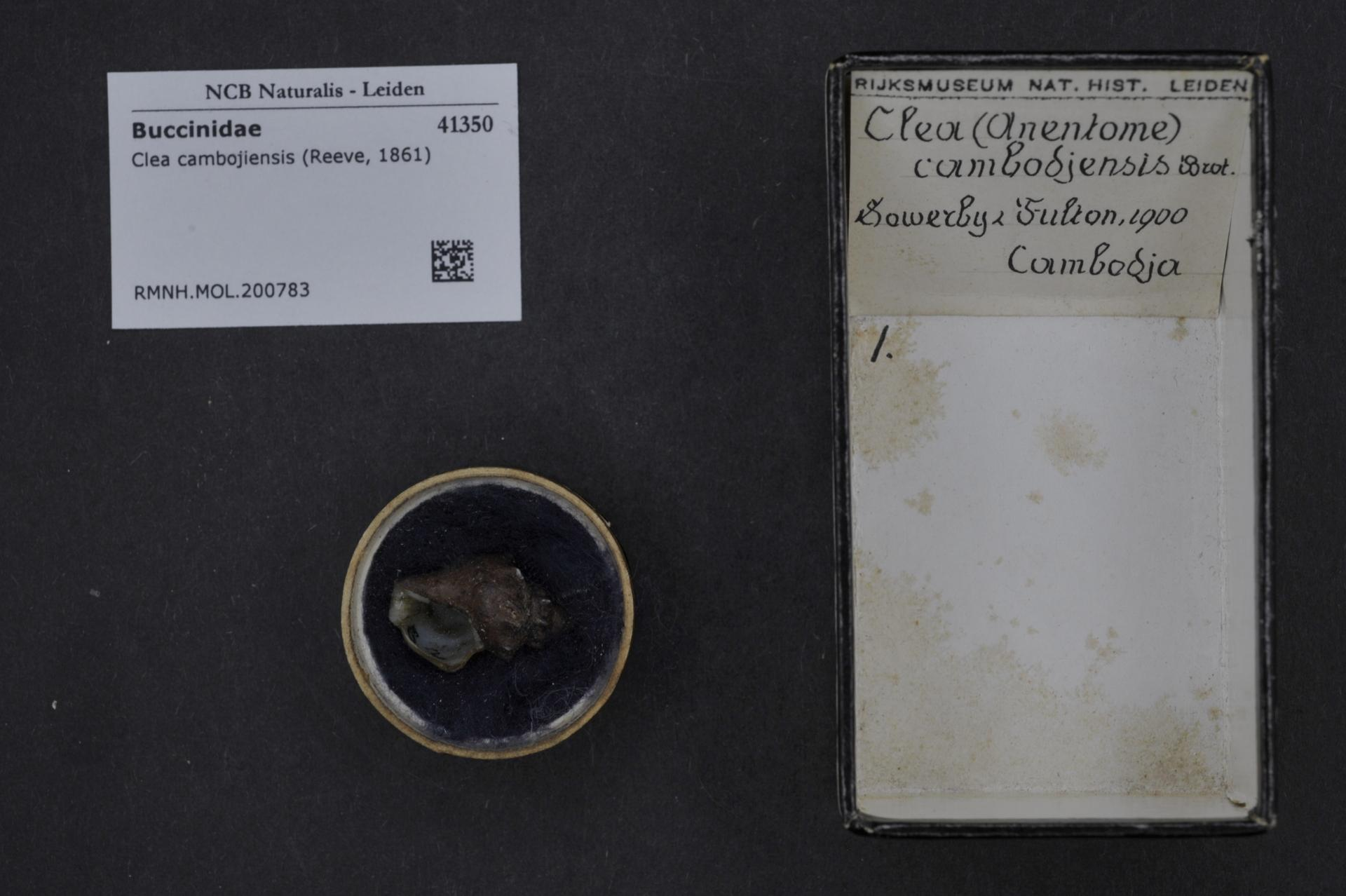
- Anentome cambojiensis shell

Scientific classification
- Kingdom: Animalia
- Phylum: Mollusca
- Class: Gastropoda
- Subclass: Caenogastropoda
- Order: Neogastropoda
- Family: Nassariidae
- Genus: Anentome
- Species: A. cambojiensis

Binomial name
- Anentome cambojiensis (Reeve, 1861)

Synonyms
- Clea (Anentome) cambojiensis (Reeve, 1861); Clea cambojiensis (Reeve, 1861); Hemisinus cambojiensis (Reeve, 1861); Melania cambojiensis Reeve, 1861; Semisinus cambojiensis (Reeve, 1861)

= Anentome cambojiensis =

Species of gastropod

Anentome cambojiensis is a species of freshwater snail with an operculum, an aquatic gastropod mollusk in the subfamily Anentominae of the family Nassariidae.

== Distribution ==
Anentome cambojiensis occurs in the Mekong River in Cambodia.

== Feeding habits ==
Like all snails in the clade Neogastropoda, this species is carnivorous. It feeds on different types of worms and gastropods, often eating other, larger snails after burying themselves and ambushing their prey.

== Reproduction ==
Anentome cambojiensis consists of defined male and female genders, and is not capable of gender change. It is unknown as to how to sex these animals. Both males and females seem to be the same size and shape. When a male and female mate, they lock together for 8–12 hours.
