= Canidia giesberti =

Scientific classification
- Kingdom: Animalia
- Phylum: Arthropoda
- Class: Insecta
- Order: Coleoptera
- Suborder: Polyphaga
- Infraorder: Cucujiformia
- Family: Cerambycidae
- Genus: Canidia
- Species: C. giesberti

Binomial name
- Canidia giesberti Wappes & Lingafelter, 2005

Species of beetle

Canidia giesberti is a species of longhorn beetles of the subfamily Lamiinae. It was described by Wappes and Lingafelter in 2005, and is known from Mexico.
