= Anentome wykoffi =

Scientific classification
- Kingdom: Animalia
- Phylum: Mollusca
- Class: Gastropoda
- Subclass: Caenogastropoda
- Order: Neogastropoda
- Family: Nassariidae
- Genus: Anentome
- Species: A. wykoffi

Binomial name
- Anentome wykoffi (Brandt, 1974)

Synonyms
- Clea (Anentome) wykoffi Brandt, 1974; Clea wykoffi Brandt, 1974

Species of gastropod

Anentome wykoffi is a species of freshwater snail with an operculum, an aquatic gastropod mollusk in the subfamily Anentominae of the family Nassariidae.

== Distribution ==
This Southeast Asian species occurs in the Tak Province in northern Thailand.

== Feeding habits ==
Like all snails in the clade Neogastropoda, this species is carnivorous. It feeds on different types of worms and gastropods, often eating other, larger snails after burying themselves and ambushing their prey.

== Reproduction ==
Anentome wykoffi consists of defined male and female genders, and is not capable of gender change. It is unknown as to how to sex these animals. Both males and females seem to be the same size and shape. When a male and female mate, they lock together for 8–12 hours.
