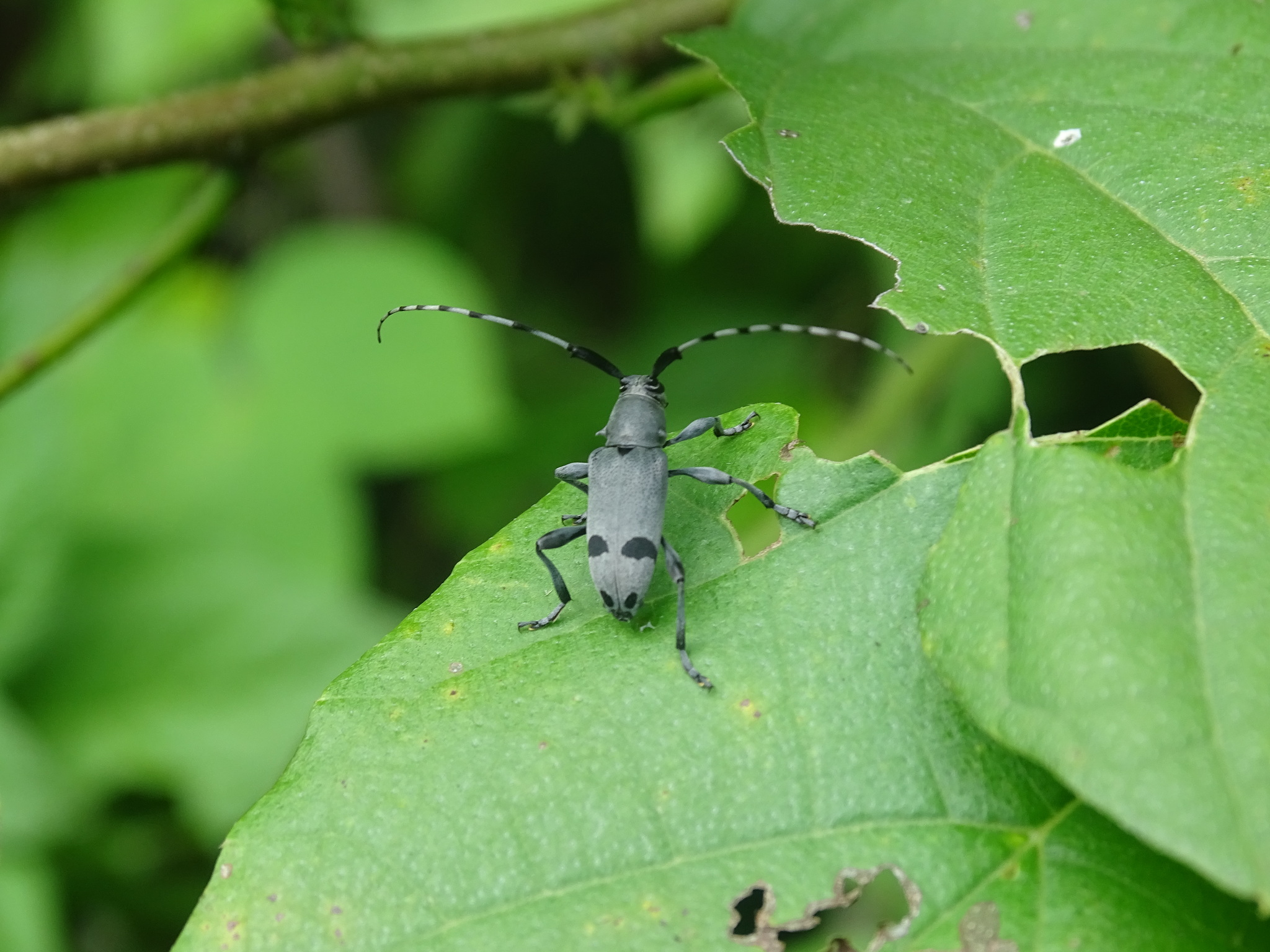

Scientific classification
- Kingdom: Animalia
- Phylum: Arthropoda
- Class: Insecta
- Order: Coleoptera
- Suborder: Polyphaga
- Infraorder: Cucujiformia
- Family: Cerambycidae
- Genus: Canidia
- Species: C. cincticornis

Binomial name
- Canidia cincticornis Thomson, 1857

= Canidia cincticornis =

Species of beetle

Canidia cincticornis is a species of longhorn beetles of the subfamily Lamiinae. It was described by Thomson in 1857, and is known from Nicaragua and Costa Rica.
