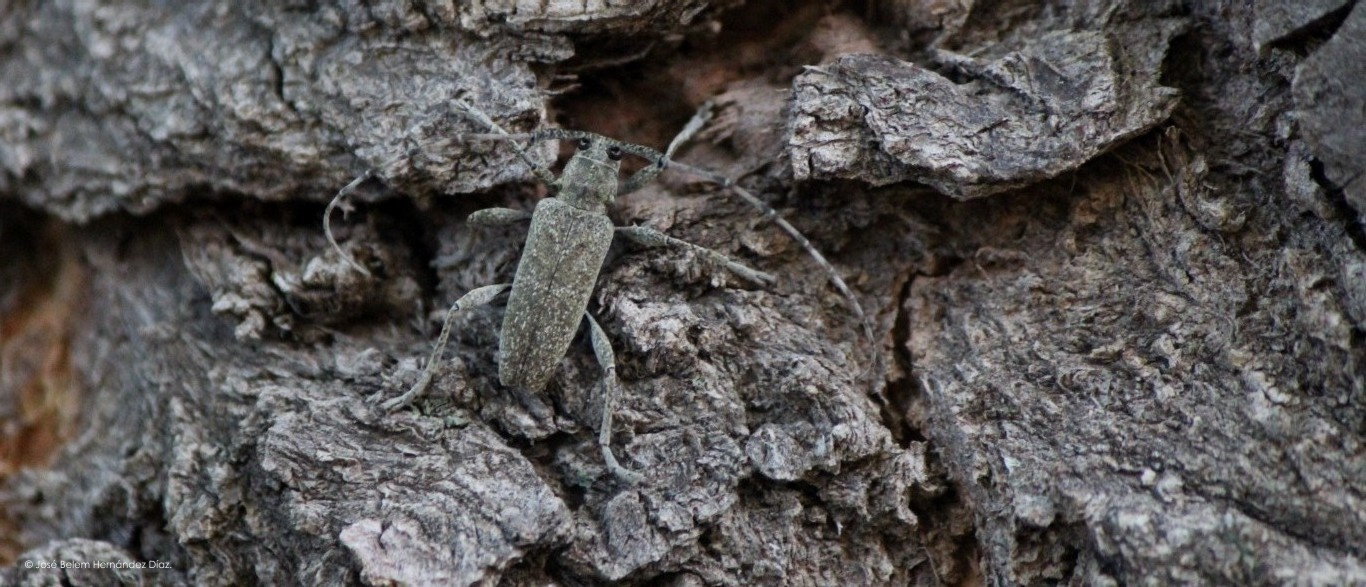

Scientific classification
- Kingdom: Animalia
- Phylum: Arthropoda
- Class: Insecta
- Order: Coleoptera
- Suborder: Polyphaga
- Infraorder: Cucujiformia
- Family: Cerambycidae
- Genus: Canidia
- Species: C. mexicana

Binomial name
- Canidia mexicana Thomson, 1860

= Canidia mexicana =

Species of beetle

Canidia mexicana is a species of longhorn beetles of the subfamily Lamiinae. It was described by James Thomson in 1860, and is known from central Mexico.
