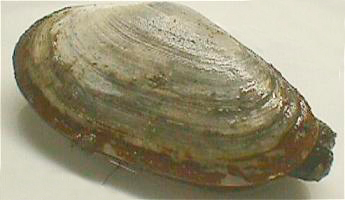
- A live individual of Mya arenaria

Scientific classification
- Domain: Eukaryota
- Kingdom: Animalia
- Phylum: Mollusca
- Class: Bivalvia
- Order: Myida
- Superfamily: Myoidea
- Family: Myidae
- Genus: Mya; Linnaeus, 1758

Species
- See text.

Synonyms
- Arenomya Winckworth, 1930; Hiatula Modeer, 1793

= Mya (bivalve) =

Genus of bivalves

Mya is a genus of saltwater clams, marine bivalve molluscs in the family Myidae. They are widespread and abundant in northern waters. Commonly known as Ipswich clams, soft-shell clam or steamers, they are routinely used as a food source for humans.

== Species ==
Species within the genus Mya include:

- Mya arenaria Linnaeus, 1758
- Mya baxteri Coan & Scott, 1997
- Mya eideri Hopner Petersen, 1999
- Mya japonica Jay, 1857
- Mya neoovata Hopner Petersen, 1999
- Mya neouddevallensis Hopner Petersen, 1999
- Mya pseudoarenaria Schlesch, 1931
- Mya truncata Linnaeus, 1758
