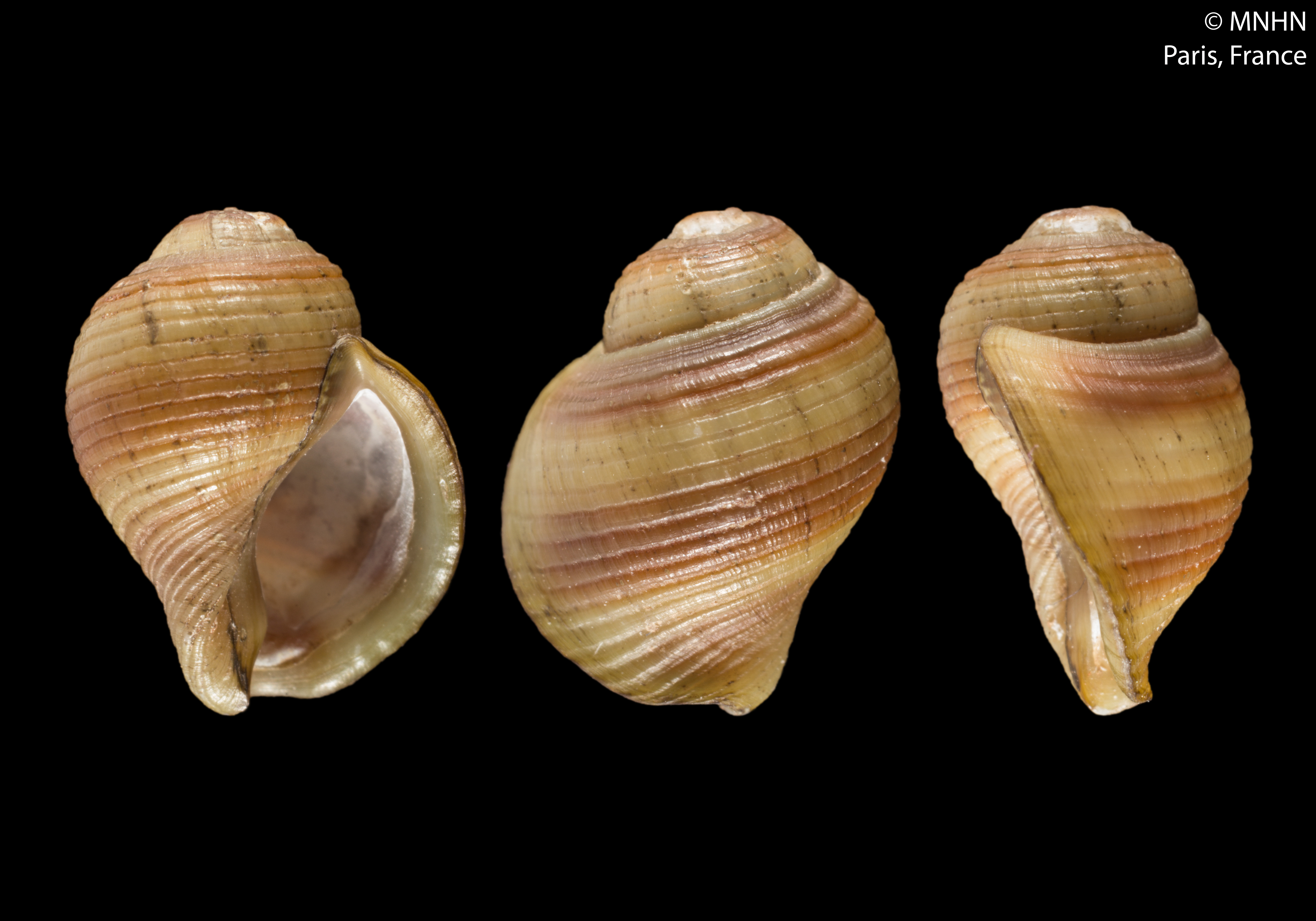

Scientific classification
- Kingdom: Animalia
- Phylum: Mollusca
- Class: Gastropoda
- Subclass: Caenogastropoda
- Order: Neogastropoda
- Family: Nassariidae
- Genus: Anentome
- Species: A. paviei

Binomial name
- Anentome paviei (Morlet, 1866)

Synonyms
- Canidia paviei Morlet, 1886; Clea paviei (Morlet, 1886)

= Anentome paviei =

Species of gastropod

Anentome paviei is a Southeast Asian species of freshwater snail with an operculum, an aquatic gastropod mollusk in the subfamily Anentominae of the family Nassariidae.

== Distribution ==
This species occurs in the Mekong River in the Khong District, Champasak Province in southern Laos.

== Feeding habits ==
Like all snails in the clade Neogastropoda, this species is carnivorous. Additionally, it feeds on different types of worms and gastropods, often eating other, larger snails after burying themselves, and ambushing their prey.

== Reproduction ==
Anentome paviei consists of defined male and female genders, and is not capable of gender change. It is unknown as to how to sex these animals. Both males and females seem to be the same size and shape. When a male and female mate, they lock together for 8–12 hours.
