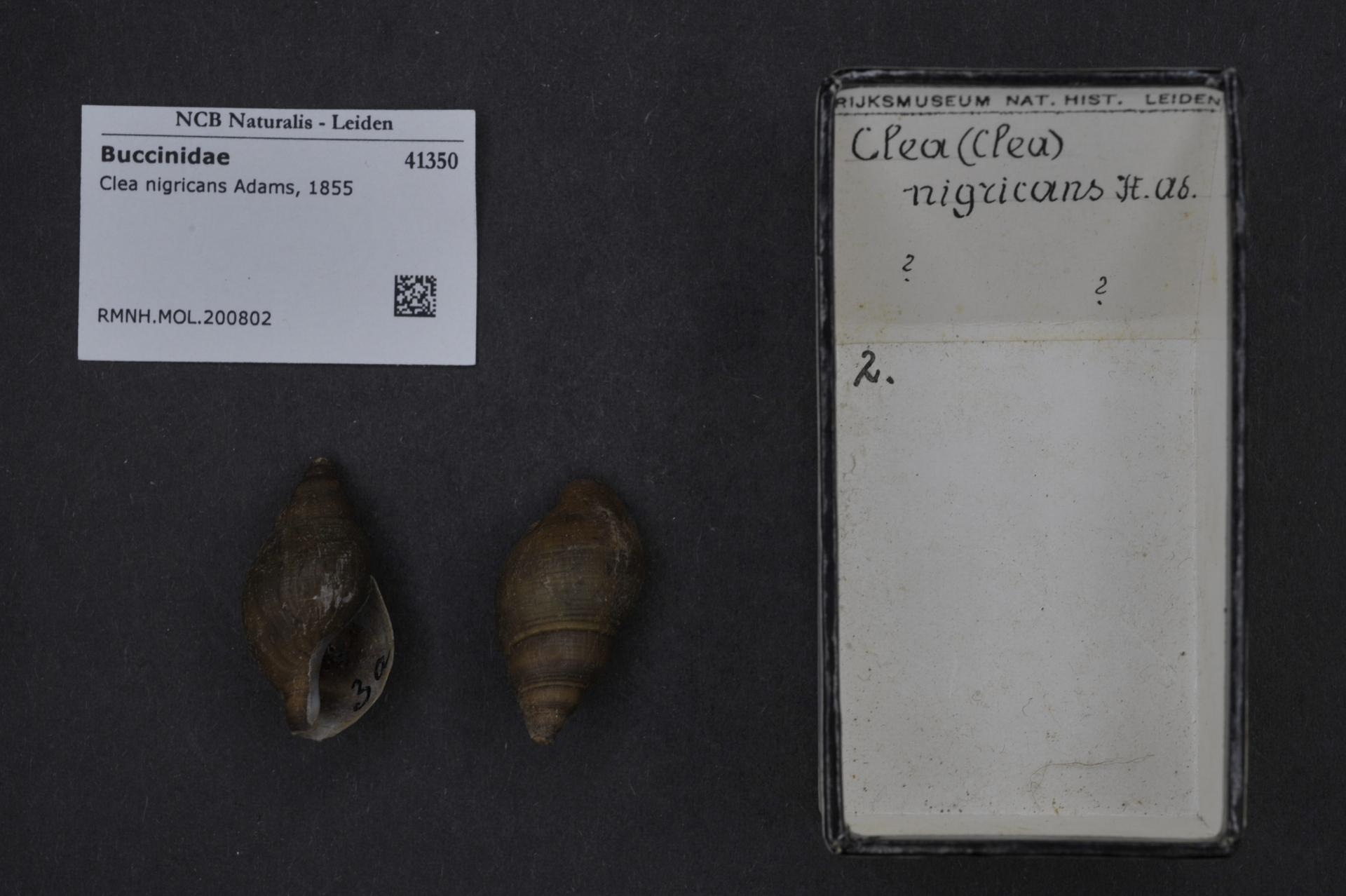
- Clea nigricans shells

Scientific classification
- Kingdom: Animalia
- Phylum: Mollusca
- Class: Gastropoda
- Subclass: Caenogastropoda
- Order: Neogastropoda
- Family: Nassariidae
- Genus: Clea
- Species: C. nigricans

Binomial name
- Clea nigricans A. Adams, 1855

Synonyms
- Clea nigricans var. fasciata Brot, 1881; Clea nigricans var. granulata E. A. Smith, 1895; Clea nigricans var. maxima Brot, 1881; Clea nigricans var. natunensis E. A. Smith, 1895; Clea nigricans var. parva E. A. Smith, 1895

= Clea nigricans =

Species of gastropod

Clea nigricans is a species of freshwater snail with an operculum, an aquatic gastropod mollusk in the family Buccinidae, the true whelks, most of which are marine.

Clea nigricans is the type species of the genus Clea.

== Distribution ==
This Southeast Asian species occurs in the Malay Peninsula. It is found in member states Sabah and Sarawak on Borneo. It was recorded also from Sirhassen island in South Natuna Islands, Indonesia.

== Description ==
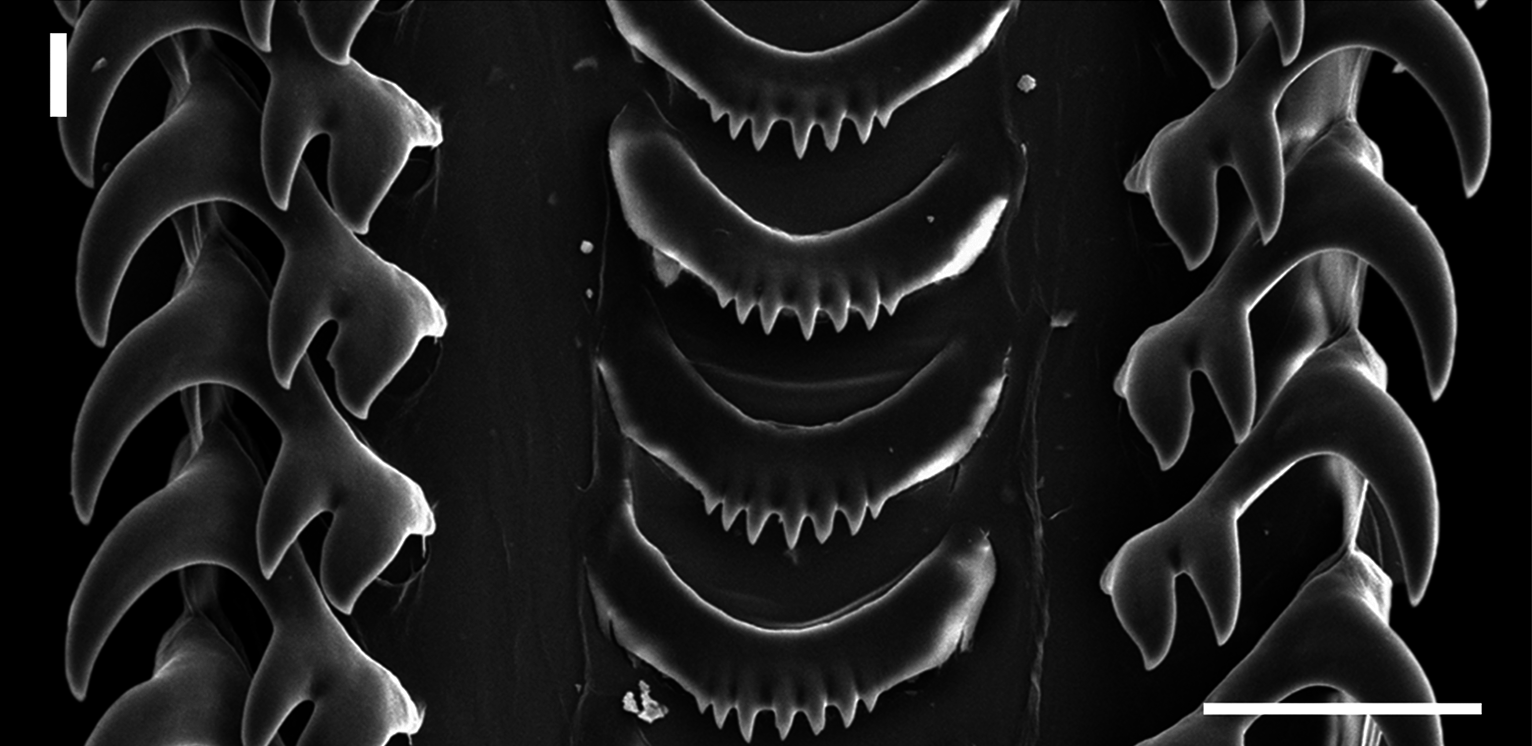
SEM photo of radula of Clea nigricans. Scale bar is 100 μm.

The width of the shell is 5–12 mm. The height of the shell is 10–22 mm.

== Ecology ==
It lives in calm pools of fast-flowing streams and also on rocks in small waterfalls. Polgar et al. (2015) measured thermal tolerance of Clea nigricans. The behaviour of Clea nigricans in natural habitat is unknown.

== Feeding habits ==
Like all snails in the clade Neogastropoda, this species is carnivorous. It feeds on different types of worms and gastropods, often eating other, larger snails after burying themselves and ambushing their prey.

== Life cycle ==
Clea nigricans consists of defined male and female genders, and is not capable of gender change. It is unknown as to how to sex these animals. Both males and females seem to be the same size and shape. When a male and female mate, they lock together for 8–12 hours.
