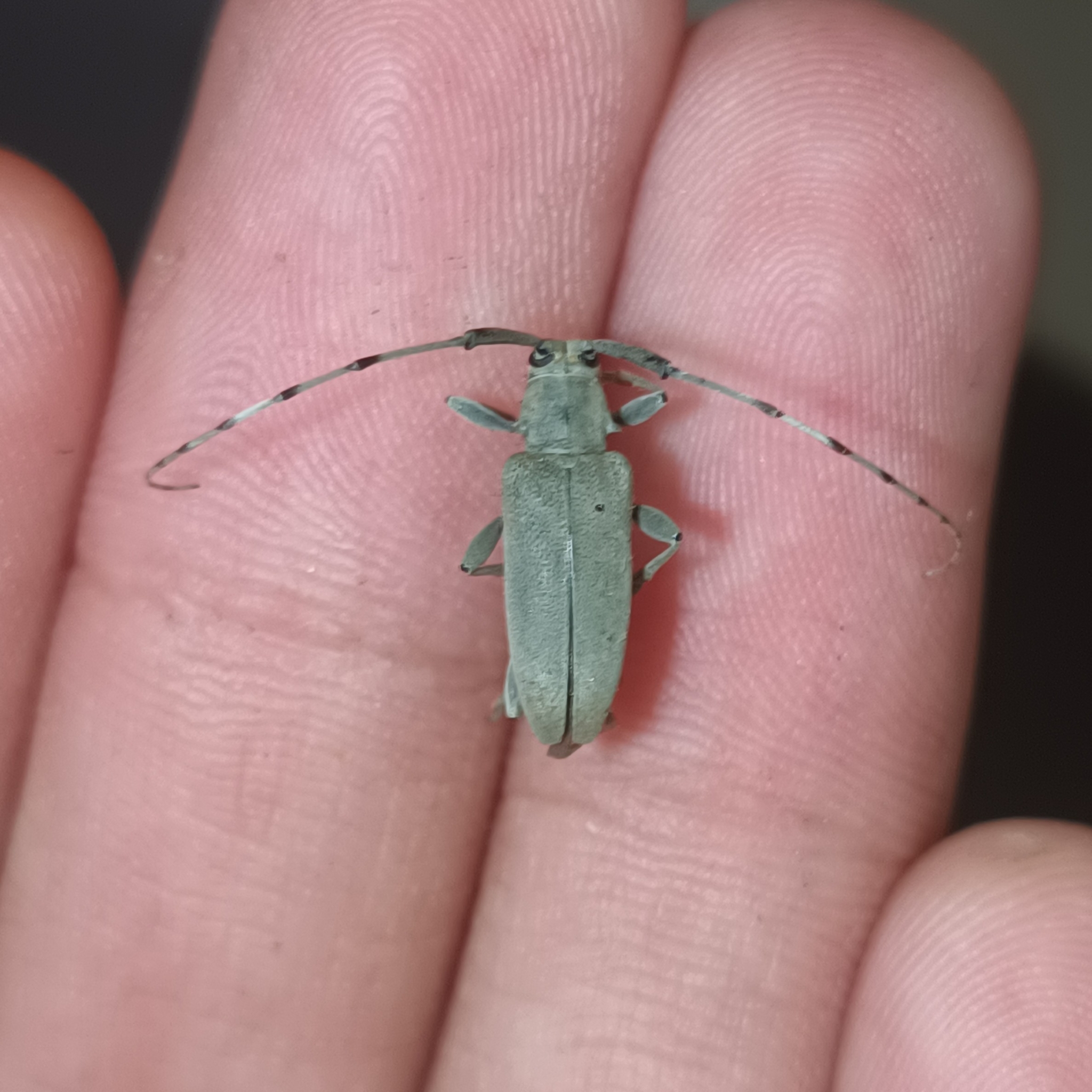

Scientific classification
- Kingdom: Animalia
- Phylum: Arthropoda
- Class: Insecta
- Order: Coleoptera
- Suborder: Polyphaga
- Infraorder: Cucujiformia
- Family: Cerambycidae
- Genus: Canidia
- Species: C. canescens

Binomial name
- Canidia canescens (Dillon, 1955)

= Canidia canescens =

Species of beetle

Canidia canescens is a species of longhorn beetles of the subfamily Lamiinae. It was described by Dillon in 1955, and is known from western Mexico.
