= Canidia ochreostictica =

Scientific classification
- Kingdom: Animalia
- Phylum: Arthropoda
- Class: Insecta
- Order: Coleoptera
- Suborder: Polyphaga
- Infraorder: Cucujiformia
- Family: Cerambycidae
- Genus: Canidia
- Species: C. ochreostictica

Binomial name
- Canidia ochreostictica (Dillon, 1956)

Species of beetle

Canidia ochreostictica is a species of longhorn beetles of the subfamily Lamiinae. It was described by Dillon in 1956, and is known from western central Mexico.
