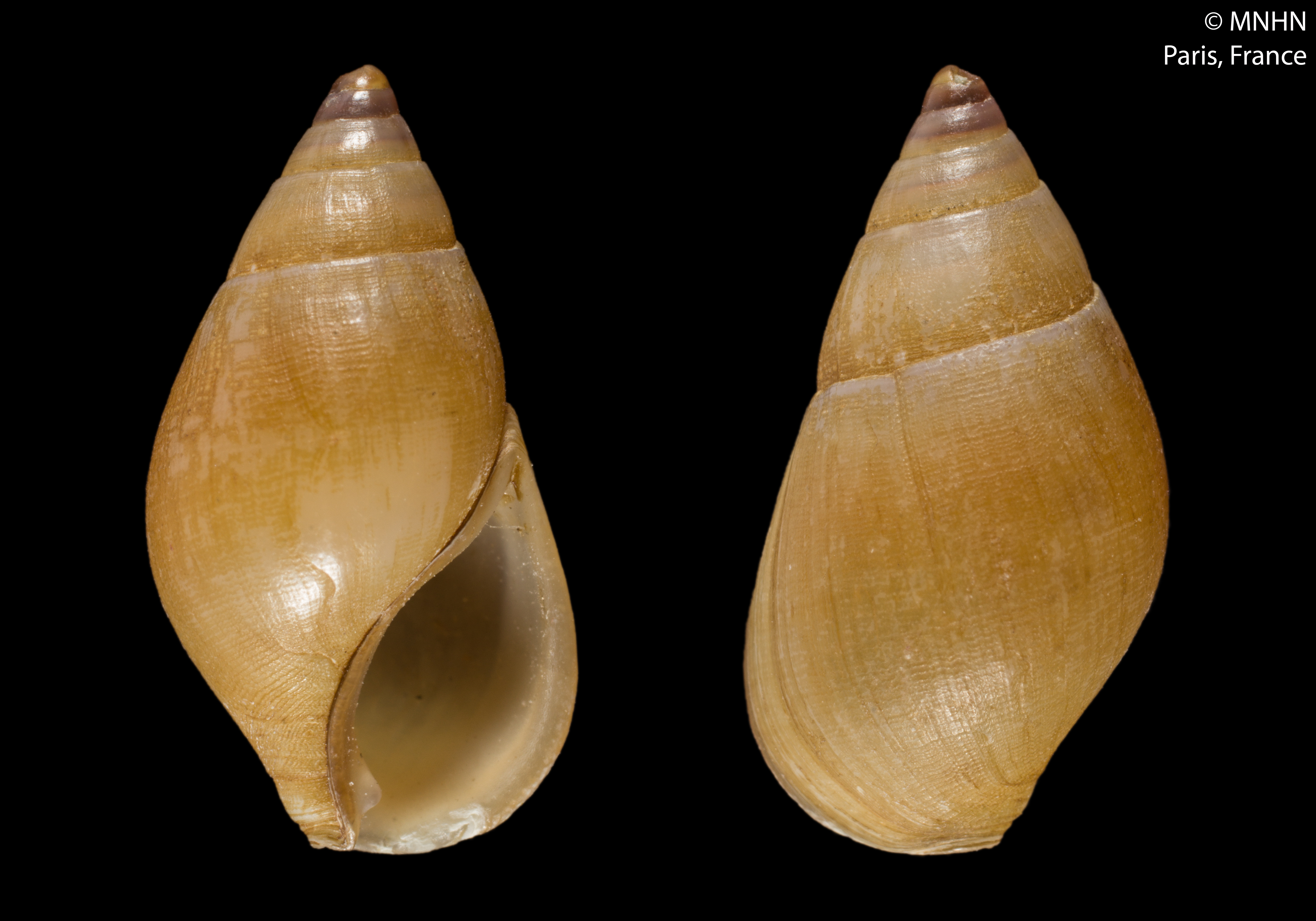
- Shell of Clea hidalgoi (lectotype at MNHN, Paris)

Scientific classification
- Kingdom: Animalia
- Phylum: Mollusca
- Class: Gastropoda
- Subclass: Caenogastropoda
- Order: Neogastropoda
- Family: Nassariidae
- Genus: Clea
- Species: C. hidalgoi

Binomial name
- Clea hidalgoi (Crosse, 1886)

Synonyms
- Quadrasia hidalgoi Crosse, 1886 (original combination)

= Clea hidalgoi =

Species of gastropod

Clea hidalgoi is a Southeast Asian species of freshwater snail with an operculum, an aquatic gastropod mollusk in the family Nassariidae, most of which are marine.

== Distribution ==
Clea hidalgoi occurs on Balabac Island, the westernmost island of the Palawan province in the Philippines.

== Feeding habits ==
Like all snails in the clade Neogastropoda, this species is carnivorous. It feeds on different types of worms and gastropods, often eating other, larger snails after burying themselves and ambushing their prey.

== Reproduction ==
Clea hidalgoi consists of defined male and female genders, and is not capable of gender change. It is unknown as to how to sex these animals. Both males and females seem to be the same size and shape. When a male and female mate, they lock together for 8–12 hours.
