= Anentome spinosa =

Conservation status
- Data Deficient (IUCN 3.1)

Scientific classification
- Kingdom: Animalia
- Phylum: Mollusca
- Class: Gastropoda
- Subclass: Caenogastropoda
- Order: Neogastropoda
- Family: Nassariidae
- Genus: Anentome
- Species: A. spinosa

Binomial name
- Anentome spinosa (Temcharoen, 1971)

Synonyms
- Clea (Anentome) spinosa Temcharoen, 1971; Clea spinosa Temcharoen, 1971

Species of gastropod

Anentome spinosa is a species of freshwater snail with an operculum, an aquatic gastropod mollusk in the subfamily Anentominae of the family Nassariidae.

== Distribution ==
This Southeast Asian species is currently known from a less than 50-km^{2} area along the Mekong River, between Khong Island in Laos and Bandan (Ban Dan Ky) in Cambodia.

== Feeding habits ==
Like all snails in the clade Neogastropoda, this species is carnivorous. It feeds on different types of worms and gastropods, often eating other, larger snails after burying themselves and ambushing their prey.

== Reproduction ==
Anentome spinosa consists of defined male and female genders, and is not capable of gender change. It is unknown as to how to sex these animals. Both males and females seem to be the same size and shape. When a male and female mate, they lock together for 8–12 hours.
