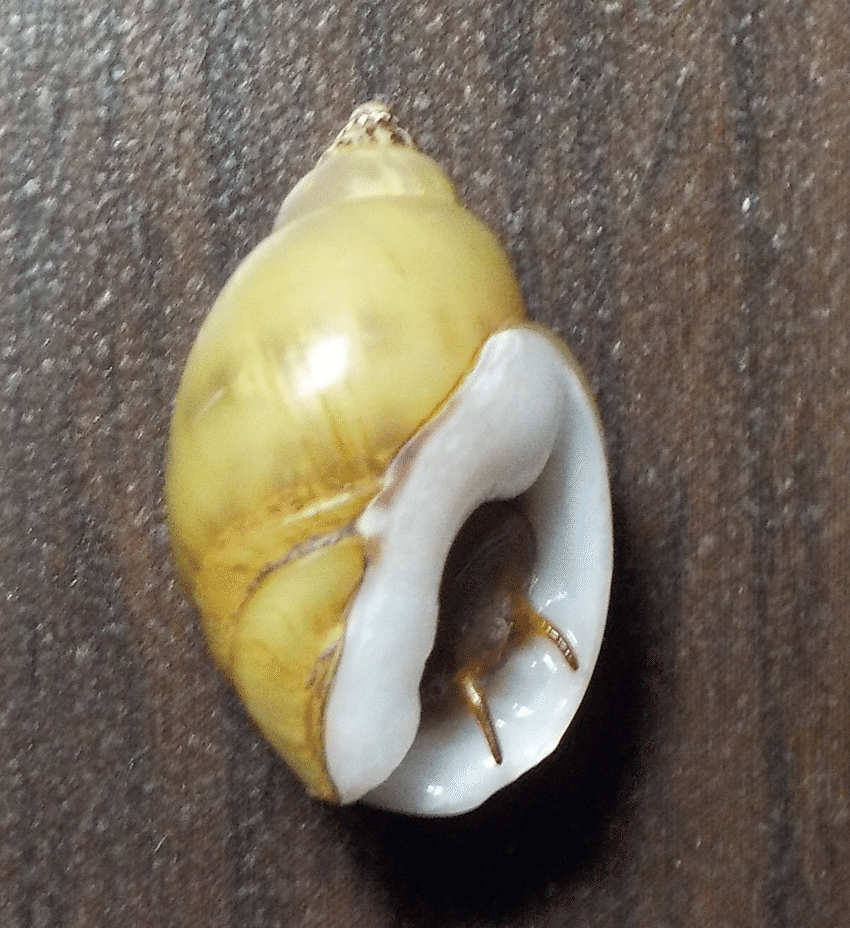
- Nassodonta insignis shell

Scientific classification
- Kingdom: Animalia
- Phylum: Mollusca
- Class: Gastropoda
- Subclass: Caenogastropoda
- Order: Neogastropoda
- Superfamily: Buccinoidea
- Family: Nassariidae
- Genus: Nassodonta; H. Adams, 1867

Type species
- Nassodonta insignis H. Adams, 1867

Synonyms
- Nassarius (Nassodonta) H. Adams, 1867

= Nassodonta =

Genus of gastropods

Nassodonta is a genus of brackish water snails, gastropod mollusks in the family Nassariidae.

Nassodonta insignis is the type species of the genus Nassodonta.

== Taxonomy ==
Arthur Adams classified the genus Nassodonta within family Buccinidae in 1867. The genus Nassodonta is traditionally placed in the subfamily Nassariinae of the family Nassariidae since 19th century and it was placed into the newly established subfamily Anentominae in 2017.

== Species ==
Species within the genus Nassodonta include:

- Nassodonta annesleyi (Benson, 1861)
- Nassodonta insignis H. Adams, 1867 - type species of the genus Nassodonta

Species brought into synonymy

- Nassodonta dorri (Wattebled, 1886): synonym of Oligohalinophila dorri (Wattebled, 1886)
- Nassodonta gravelyi Preston, 1916: synonym of Nassodonta annesleyi (Benson, 1860)
