= Anentome scalarina =

Scientific classification
- Kingdom: Animalia
- Phylum: Mollusca
- Class: Gastropoda
- Subclass: Caenogastropoda
- Order: Neogastropoda
- Family: Nassariidae
- Genus: Anentome
- Species: A. scalarina

Binomial name
- Anentome scalarina (Deshayes in Deshayes & Jullien, 1876)

Synonyms
- Canidia scalarina Deshayes, 1874; Clea (Anentome) scalarina (Deshayes, 1876); Clea scalarina (Deshayes, 1876)

Species of gastropod

Anentome scalarina is a Southeast Asian species of freshwater snail with an operculum, an aquatic gastropod mollusk in the subfamily Anentominae of the family Nassariidae.

== Distribution ==
This species occurs in the Mekong River in the Khong District, Champasak Province in southern Laos, and in Mekong in the Ban Dan District and Ubon Ratchathani Province in eastern Thailand.

== Feeding habits ==
Like all snails in the clade Neogastropoda, this species is carnivorous. It feeds on different types of worms and gastropods, often eating other, larger snails after burying themselves and ambushing their prey.

== Reproduction ==
Anentome scalarina consists of defined male and female genders, and is not capable of gender change. It is unknown as to how to sex these animals. Both males and females seem to be the same size and shape. When a male and female mate, they lock together for 8–12 hours.
