= Clea broti =

Conservation status
- Data Deficient (IUCN 3.1)

Scientific classification
- Kingdom: Animalia
- Phylum: Mollusca
- Class: Gastropoda
- Subclass: Caenogastropoda
- Order: Neogastropoda
- Family: Nassariidae
- Genus: Clea
- Species: C. broti

Binomial name
- Clea broti Deshayes, 1876

Synonyms
- Canidia bizonata Deshayes, 1876

Species of gastropod

Clea broti is a Southeast Asian species of freshwater snail with an operculum, an aquatic gastropod mollusk in the family Buccinidae, the true whelks, most of which are marine.

== Distribution ==
Clea broti occurs in the Mekong River in the Khong District, Champasak Province in southern Laos and in Kas Lognieu, Sambor, and Sandan in Cambodia.

== Feeding habits ==
Like all snails in the clade Neogastropoda, this species is carnivorous. It feeds on different types of worms and gastropods, often eating other, larger snails after burying themselves and ambushing their prey.

== Reproduction ==
Clea broti consists of defined male and female genders, and is not capable of gender change. It is unknown as to how to sex these animals. Both males and females seem to be the same size and shape. When a male and female mate, they lock together for 8–12 hours.
