= Oligohalinophila =

Scientific classification
- Domain: Eukaryota
- Kingdom: Animalia
- Phylum: Mollusca
- Class: Gastropoda
- Subclass: Caenogastropoda
- Order: Neogastropoda
- Superfamily: Buccinoidea
- Family: Nassariidae
- Genus: Oligohalinophila; Neiber & Glaubrecht, 2019

Type species
- Canidia dorri Wattebled, 1886

Genus of gastropods

Oligohalinophila is a genus of freshwater snails with opercula, aquatic gastropod mollusks in the subfamily Anentominae of the family Nassariidae. It is one of few freshwater species in this family, which is a predominately marine family.

== Species ==
- Oligohalinophila dorri (Wattebled, 1886)
