= Nassodonta annesleyi =

Scientific classification
- Kingdom: Animalia
- Phylum: Mollusca
- Class: Gastropoda
- Subclass: Caenogastropoda
- Order: Neogastropoda
- Family: Nassariidae
- Genus: Nassodonta
- Species: N. annesleyi

Binomial name
- Nassodonta annesleyi (Benson, 1861)

Synonyms
- Clea annesleyi Benson, 1861; Nassodonta gravelyi Preston, 1916

Species of gastropod

Nassodonta annesleyi is a species of brackish water snail, with gills and an operculum, a gastropod mollusk in the family Nassariidae.

The specific name annesleyi is in honour of Lieutenant-Colonel Charles Annesley Benson (1831–1906) of the 45th Regiment of Madras Native Infantry, who collected those snails.

== Distribution ==
India.
