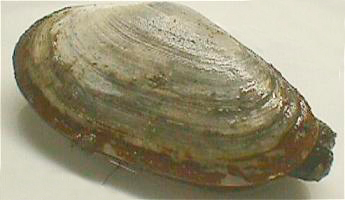

Scientific classification
- Kingdom: Animalia
- Phylum: Mollusca
- Class: Bivalvia
- Order: Myida
- Superfamily: Myoidea
- Family: Myidae
- Genus: Mya
- Species: M. arenaria

Binomial name
- Mya arenaria Linnaeus, 1758

= Soft-shell clam =

Soft-shell clam or Sand Gaper Temporal range: Oligocene–Present

Species of mollusc

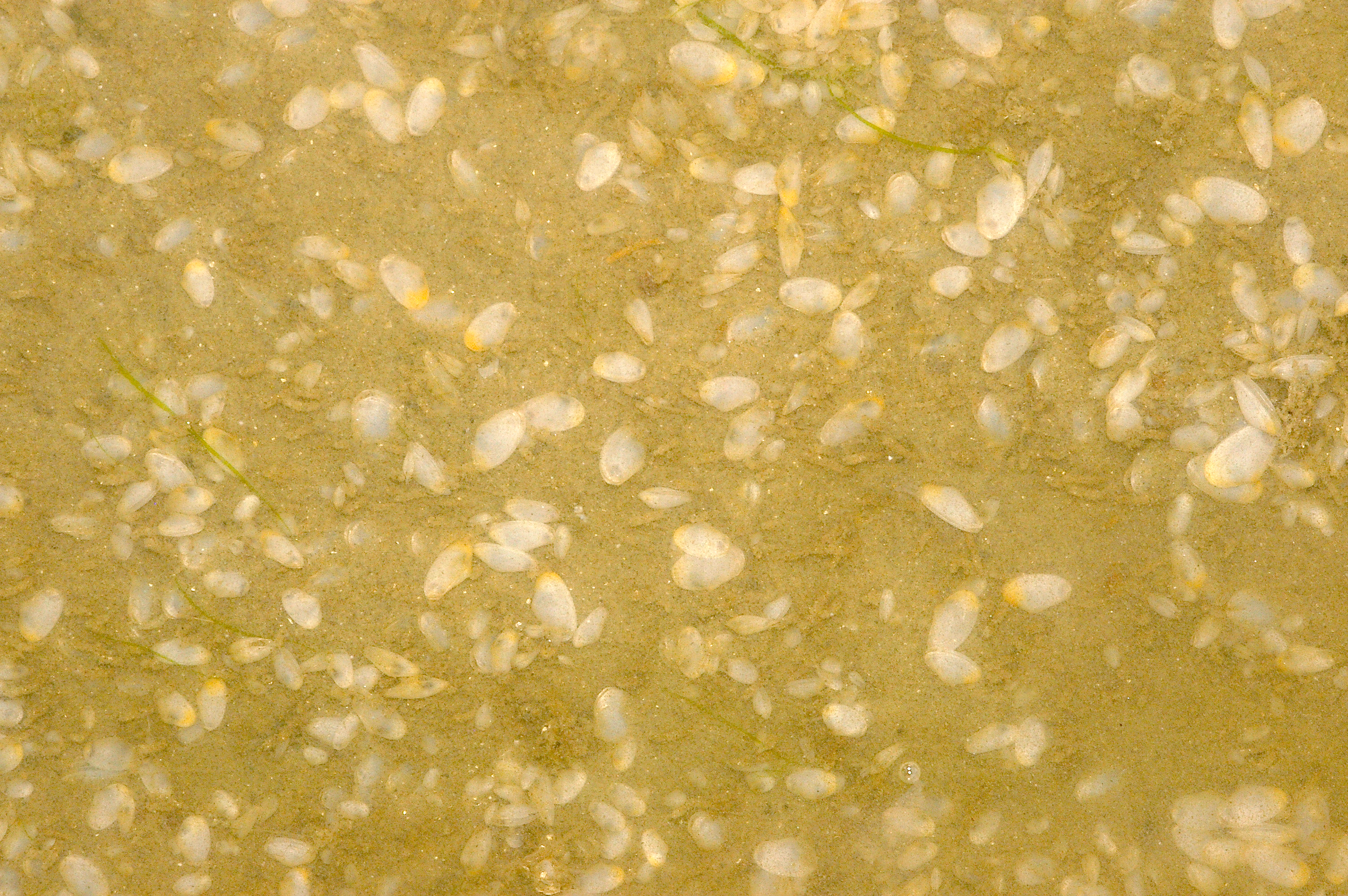

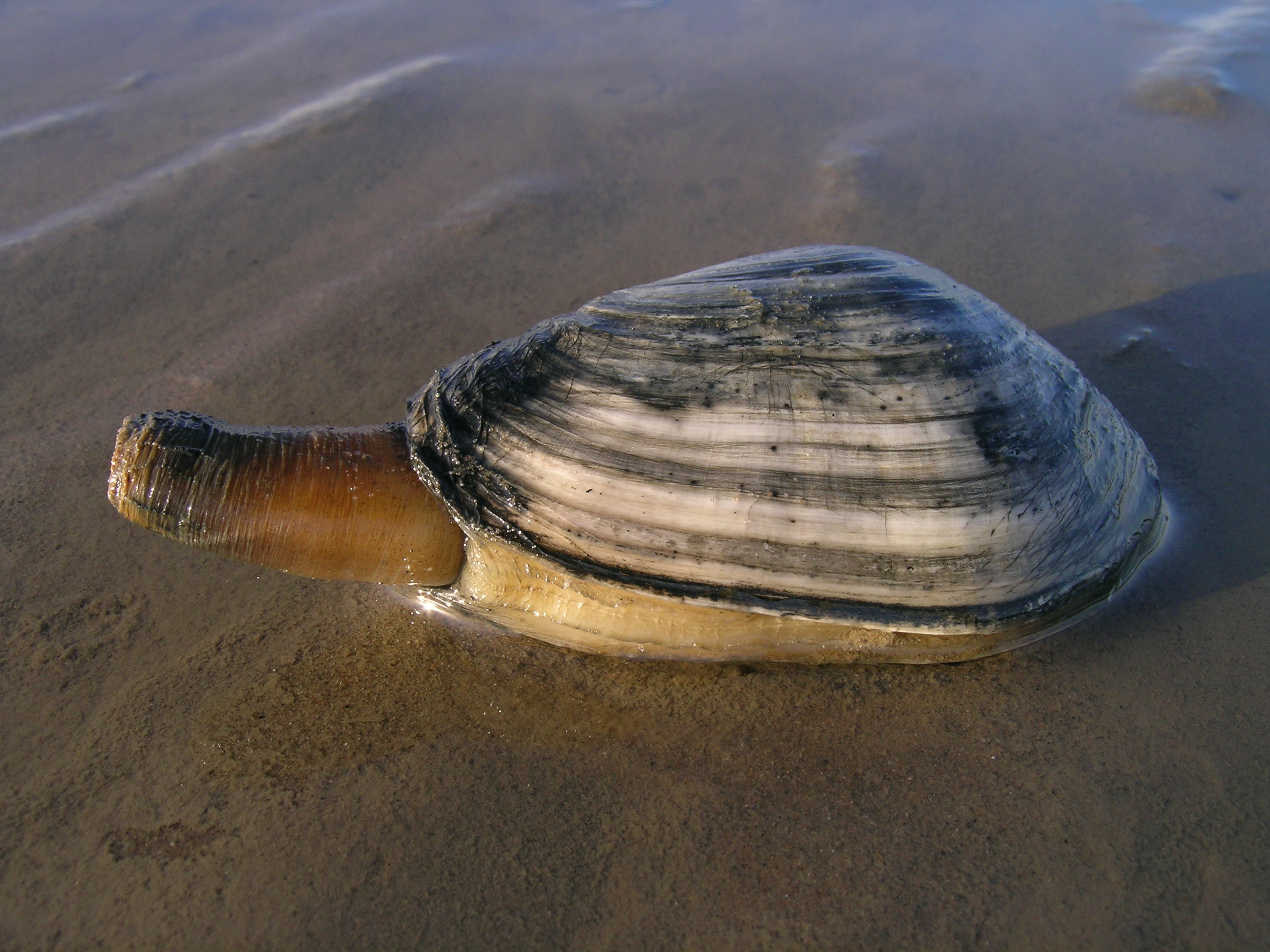

Soft-shell clams (American English) or Sand gaper (British English/Europe), scientific name Mya arenaria, popularly called "steamers", "softshells", "piss clams", "Ipswich clams", or "Essex clams", are a species of edible saltwater clam, a marine bivalve mollusk in the family Myidae.

Right and left valve of the same specimen:

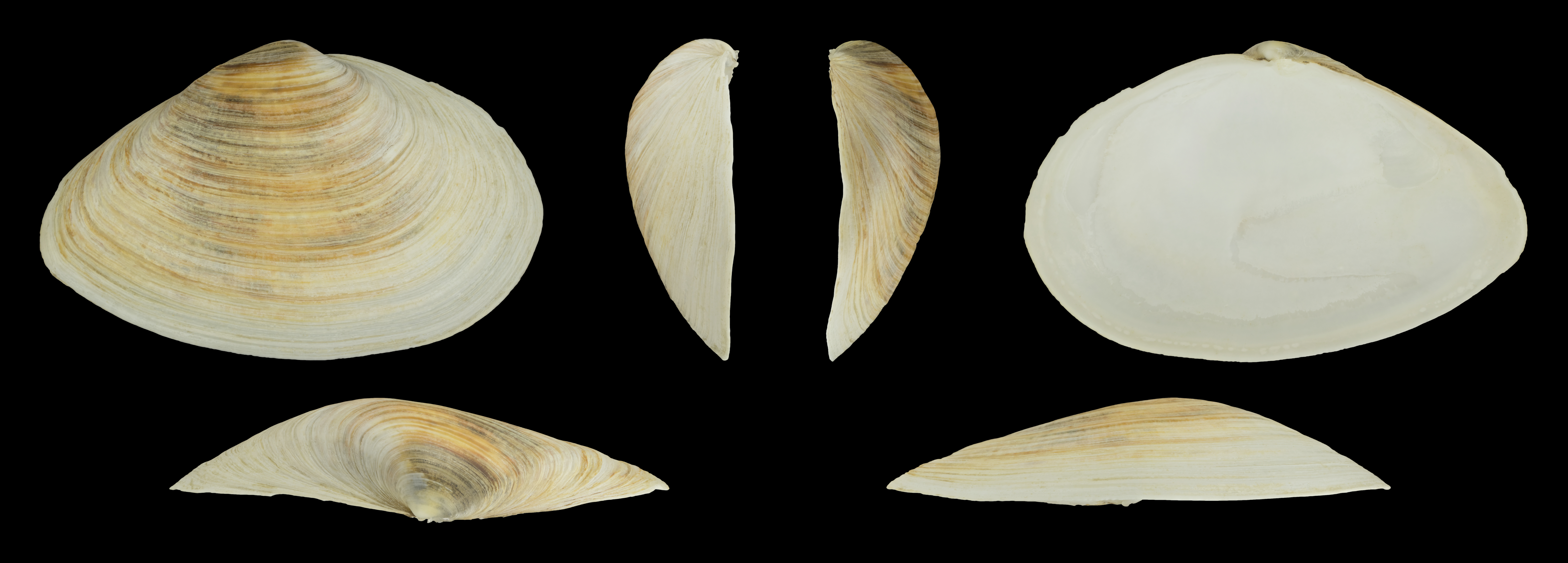
Right valve

Left valve

== Habitat and distribution ==
These clams live buried in the sediment on tidal flats. While they are common in muddy areas, their name "arenaria" means sandy and they prefer a combination of sandy and muddy areas. They are well known as a food item on the coast of New England in the Western Atlantic Ocean; however, the range extends much farther north to Canada and south to the Southern states.

They are also found in the Eastern Atlantic Ocean, for example in the UK, as well as in the North Sea's Wadden Sea (where they are the dominant large clam).

In Soviet Union, the species was first detected in 1966, and, soon after, their population exploded in the northwestern and western part of the Black Sea and in the Sea of Azov.

From 1921 to 2021, the species was abundant in Kola Bay. In modern Russia, the species was discovered at Tuloma river for the first time. Ever since, the highest abundance was recorded from Khlebnaya, while the lowest was at Belokamennaya, with and Vayenga bay being empty of the species.

This species has become invasive on the Pacific coast of North America, including Alaska, Canada and the continental United States. However M. arenaria originated in the Pacific Ocean during the Miocene. It extended its range in the early Pliocene to the Atlantic, including European waters. The Pacific and European populations became extinct some time in the early Pleistocene, leaving only the Northwest Atlantic population, which subsequently spread via humans to its current distribution. It also occurs in the Mediterranean Sea.

== Physiology ==
Mya arenaria has a calcium carbonate shell that is thin and easily broken, hence the name "soft-shells" (as opposed to its beach-dwelling neighbors in some regions, the thick-shelled quahog).

This clam is found living approximately 3–8 in (7.6–20.3 cm) under the surface of the mud. It extends its paired siphons up to the surface; these draw in seawater, filter it for food, and expel it. The holes in the mud through which the water is drawn in and out can often be seen at low tide. Water may be visibly ejected from the siphon tips when pressure is applied to the surrounding mud. This makes the clams easier to locate when humans are clam digging.

== Predators ==
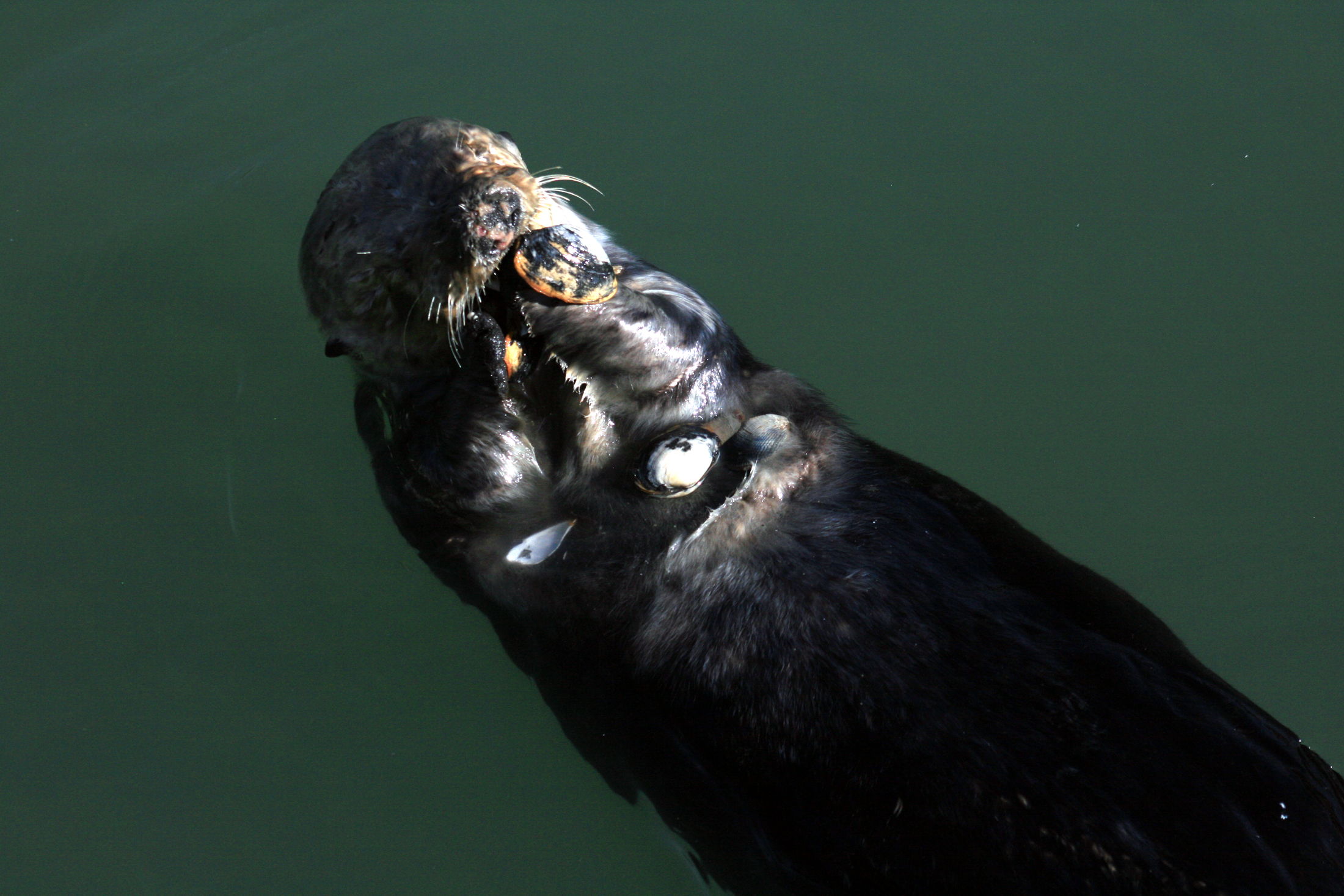
A sea otter at Moss Landing, California, eating what appear to be Mya arenaria

As well as being eaten by humans, the soft-shelled clam is relished by sea otters in the eastern Pacific Ocean, where the clam is an invasive species. In New England the soft-shell clam is preyed heavily upon by northern moon snails and invasive green crabs. They are also a favorite of gulls, which pull the clam from the sand, climb to about 15–20 ft (5–6 m), and then drop the clam on a hard surface, breaking the shell. They then dive down quickly to eat the soft parts of the clam before others can get to it.

== Cooking ==
Soft-shell clams are edible and can be used in a variety of dishes. Before cooking, it is generally recommended that clams be stored in saltwater for a few hours to facilitate the expulsion of sand from their digestive tracts. Some recommend that cornmeal be added to the water to give the clams something to filter from it.

Soft-shell clams can be eaten steamed, fried, or in clam chowder. "Steamers" (steamed soft-shell clams) are an integral part of the New England clam bake, where they are served steamed whole in the shell, then pulled from the shell at the table, the neck skin is removed and then while holding the clam by the neck it is dipped, first in the clam broth in which they were cooked, to rinse away remaining sand, and then very briefly in melted butter.

== Scientific literature ==
- Gallant, D., A. Poulin, & E. Tremblay (2006). Évaluation statistique et optimisation du programme de monitoring de la mye commune (Mya arenaria) au parc national du Canada Kouchibouguac. Parcs Canada – Rapports techniques en matière de sciences des écosystèmes, 045, ix + 67p. (in French with English abstract; ISBN 0-662-71418-0, ISSN 1200-3298)
