= Ellen E. Strong =

American malacologist

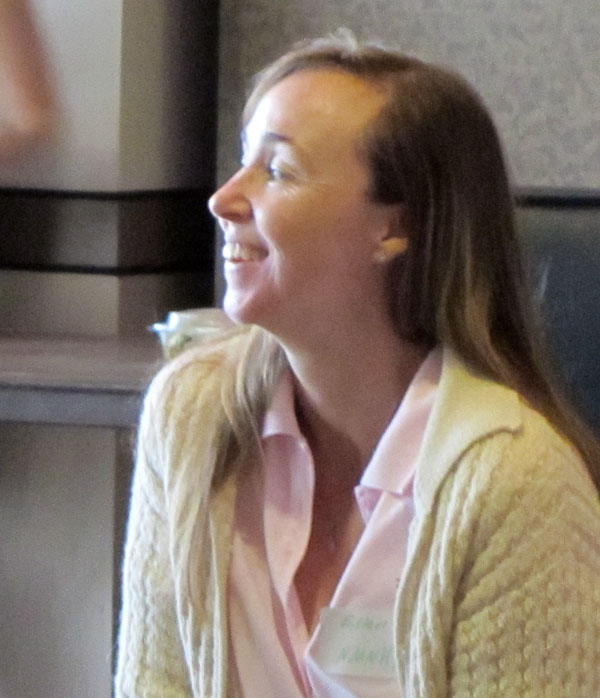
- Strong in 2010
- Education: University of California at Berkeley, California; George Washington University
- Scientific career
- Fields: Malacology
- Workplaces: National Museum of Natural History

Ellen E. Strong is an American research zoologist. She is the curator of Mollusca, and the chair of the Department of Invertebrate Zoology at the Smithsonian Institution's National Museum of Natural History. She studies the diversity and the evolutionary relationships of freshwater and marine snails. Many of these snails have been affected by humans and she is part of conservation efforts by informing best how to help these species.

== Life and career ==
Ellen Strong grew up in northern California in a small town. She would collect shells and minerals on the beaches near her home, but she found her interest in being a malacologist in her first year of college during a geology course. This course allowed her to get a job at the University of California Museum of Paleontology. She graduated with honors from the University of California Berkeley in 1991 with a BA in Paleontology. In 2000, she received her PhD in Biology with honors from George Washington University. She was a postdoctoral fellow at the Museum für Naturkunde in Berlin, Germany from 2000 to 2001 and then the Smithsonian Institution until 2002. She was appointed as an assistant professor in the fisheries, wildlife, and conservation biology department of the University of Minnesota, Minneapolis. In 2004, she became a research zoologist in the Department of Invertebrate Zoology at the National Museum of Natural History.

Strong is an editor of the book Tropical Deep-Sea Benthos 29 and has written many papers.
