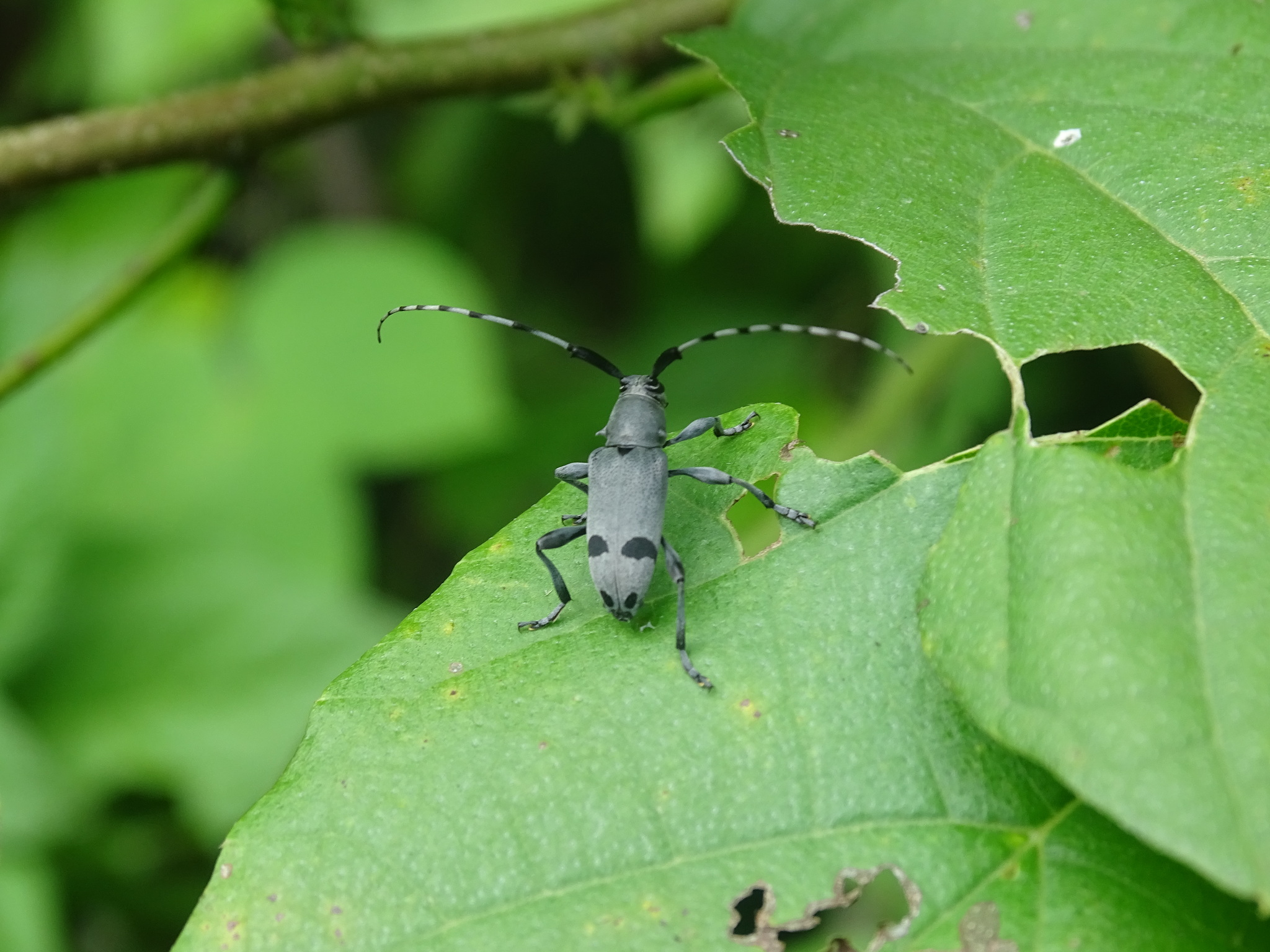
- Canidia cincticornis

Scientific classification
- Kingdom: Animalia
- Phylum: Arthropoda
- Class: Insecta
- Order: Coleoptera
- Suborder: Polyphaga
- Infraorder: Cucujiformia
- Family: Cerambycidae
- Subfamily: Lamiinae
- Tribe: Acanthocinini
- Genus: Canidia; Thomson, 1857

= Canidia =

Genus of beetles

Canidia is a genus of beetles in the family Cerambycidae, containing the following species:

- Canidia canescens (Dillon, 1955)
- Canidia chemsaki Wappes & Lingafelter, 2005
- Canidia cincticornis Thomson, 1857
- Canidia giesberti Wappes & Lingafelter, 2005
- Canidia mexicana Thomson, 1860
- Canidia ochreostictica (Dillon, 1956)
- Canidia spinicornis (Bates, 1881)
- Canidia turnbowi Wappes & Lingafelter, 2005
