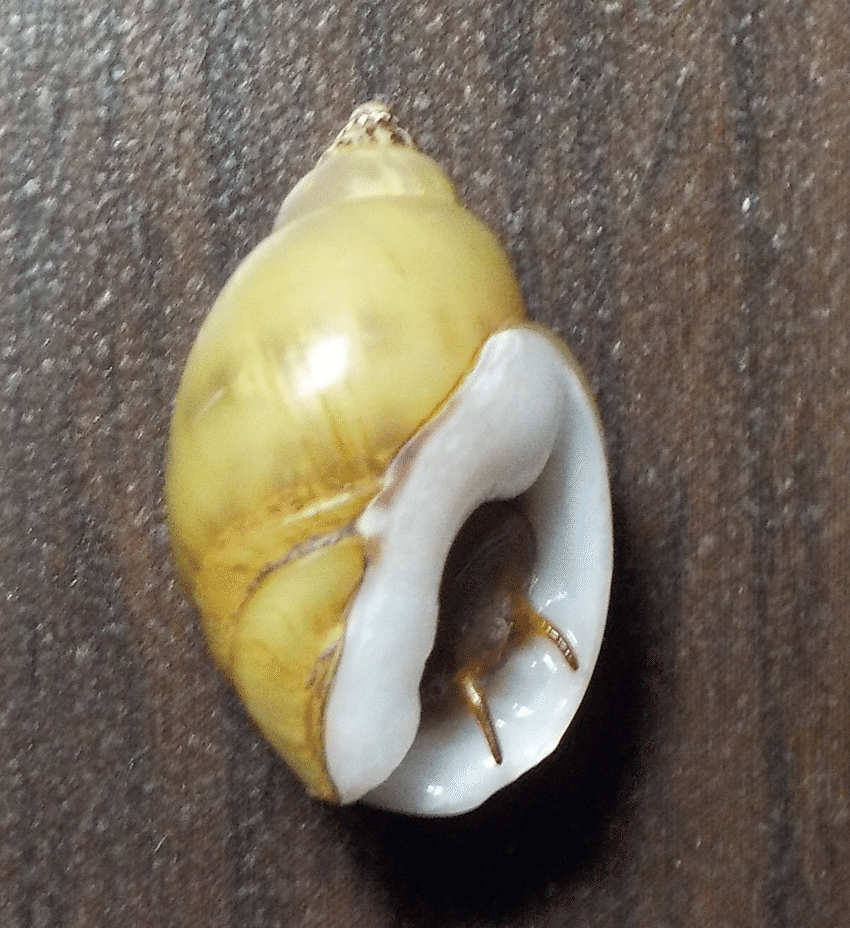
- Nassodonta insignis

Scientific classification
- Domain: Eukaryota
- Kingdom: Animalia
- Phylum: Mollusca
- Class: Gastropoda
- Subclass: Caenogastropoda
- Order: Neogastropoda
- Family: Nassariidae
- Genus: Nassodonta
- Species: N. insignis

Binomial name
- Nassodonta insignis H. Adams, 1867

= Nassodonta insignis =

Species of gastropod

Nassodonta insignis is a species of brackish water snail, with gills and an operculum, a gastropod mollusk in the family Nassariidae.

Nassodonta insignis is the type species of the genus Nassodonta. This species distributed in the brackish water habitats of southwest coast of India.

== Distribution ==
Apparently confined to the southern coasts of India inshallow, brackish water. Reported by Preston from Cochin (Kochi) backwaters near Ernakulam. Smith (1895) pointed out that the original locality indication of Nassodonta insignis was “Peiho river, China”, and stated that on the label accompanying the type is written “Peihoi, fresh water, Calvert, with genus Velorita”. Smith further pointed out that the genus Velorita (Villorita cyprinoides, Gray, 1825) occurs only on the west side of the Indian Peninsula, in the neighbourhood of Cochin, and in the estuary of the river Kundapur, (where it is largely eaten by natives), and that it has never been found in China, and that “Peihoi” could be some small village on the Malabar coast. The present study suggests that “Peiho river” may be “Periyar river”_{.} the largest river in the south west coast of India that feeds Cochin (Kochi) backwaters.

== Description ==
Shell up to 12.0mm in length, ovate and solid, some specimens broader than others, teleconch of only 3-3 ½ convex whorls, protoconch of 1 ½ embryonic whorls, partly macroscopically axially striate; shell smooth except for very fine axial growth lines and a heavy, flattish spiral cord at base of body whorl. Aperture moderately narrow, outerlip thickened but not strongly variced, interior with 4-5 denticles decreasing in size anteriorly. Columella concave and with a moderately broad and thick callus, a strong fold at the anterior end and occasionally with another weak plication; siphonal notch deep and broad, parietal denticle swollen, anal canal distinct. Color fawn to brown, last whorl decorated with a moderately broad, interrupted brown subsutural band and a broad dark brown band on the posterior half. Aperture white but occasionally stained with brown. Smith (1895) correctly transferred the species from the Buccinidae to the Nassariidae, based on the presence of multicuspidate rachidian tooth of radula. Operculum thick, roundish, exceptional for the family Nassariidae, two vertical teeth.
