= Anentominae =

Scientific classification
- Kingdom: Animalia
- Phylum: Mollusca
- Class: Gastropoda
- Subclass: Caenogastropoda
- Order: Neogastropoda
- Family: Nassariidae
- Subfamily: Anentominae; E. E. Strong, Galindo & Kantor, 2017

Genera
- Anentome Cossmann, 1901; Clea H. Adams & A. Adams, 1855; Oligohalinophila Neiber & Glaubrecht, 2019

Subfamily of gastropod

Anentominae is a subfamily of freshwater snail in the family Nassariidae.

Former genera

- Canidia H. Adams, 1862: synonym of Anentome Cossmann, 1901 (invalid: junior homonym of Canidia J. Thomson, 1857 [Coleoptera]; Anentome is a replacement name)
- Quadrasia Crosse, 1886: synonym of Clea H. Adams & A. Adams, 1855 (junior subjective synonym)
