= List of the Cenozoic life of Mississippi =

This list of the Cenozoic life of Mississippi contains the various prehistoric life-forms whose fossilized remains have been reported from within the US state of Mississippi and are between 66 million and 10,000 years of age.

== A ==
- †Abderospira
  - †Abderospira aldrichi
  - †Abderospira leblanci
  - †Abderospira meyeri
  - †Abderospira oviformis
  - †Abderospira oviforms
- †Abdounia
  - †Abdounia beaugei
  - †Abdounia subulidens
- Abra – tentative report
- Abra – or unidentified comparable form
- Abra
  - †Abra nitens
  - †Abra pectorosa
  - †Abra perovata
- †Acanthionella
  - †Acanthionella oecioporosa
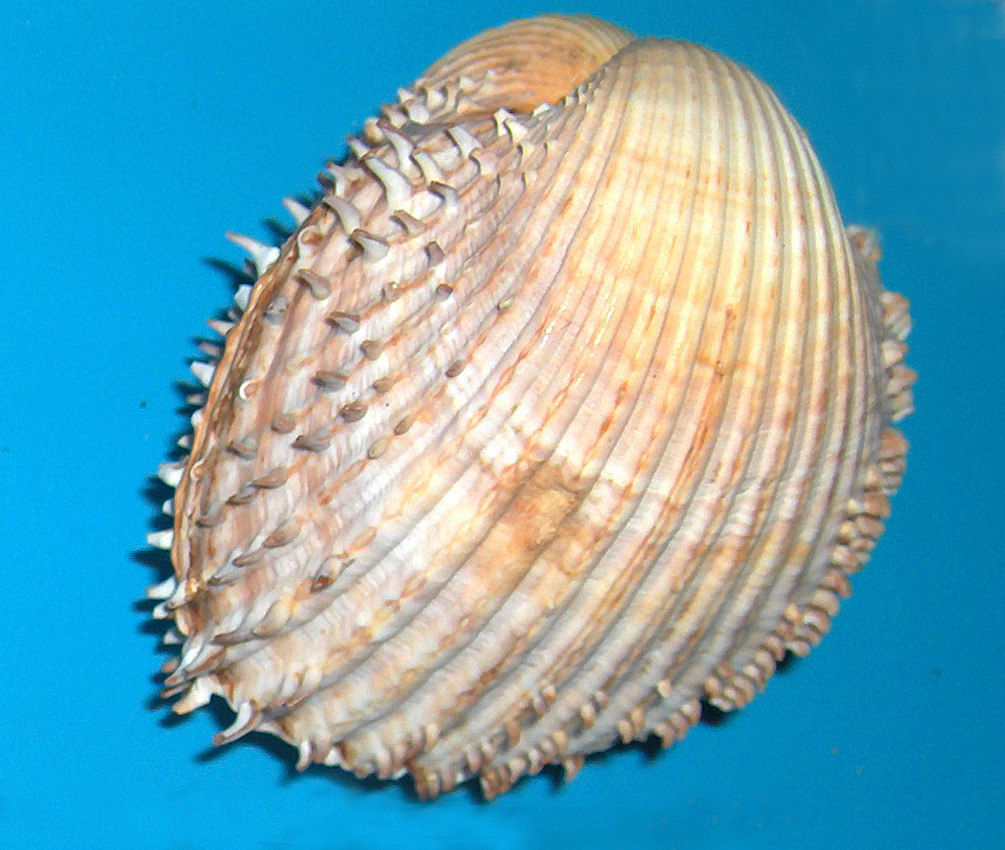
- Shell of an Acanthocardia cockle
  Acanthocardia
  - †Acanthocardia claibornensis
  - †Acanthocardia glebosum
- Acar
  - †Acar aspera
- Acirsa – tentative report
  - †Acirsa solumcostata – type locality for species
- Aclis
  - †Aclis matsoni – type locality for species
- †Acra
  - †Acra subprotracta
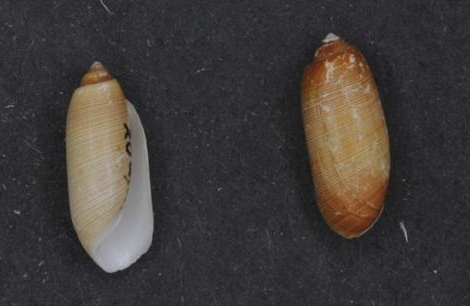
- Shells of Acteocina barrel-bubble sea snails
  Acteocina
  - †Acteocina crassiplica
- Acteon
  - †Acteon annectens
  - †Acteon idoneus
  - †Acteon menthafons – type locality for species
  - †Acteon meyeri – type locality for species
  - †Acteon pomilius
  - †Acteon punctatus – type locality for species
  - †Acteon subaldrichi – type locality for species
- Adeonellopsis
  - †Adeonellopsis cyclops
  - †Adeonellopsis galeata – type locality for species
  - †Adeonellopsis quisenberryae – type locality for species
  - †Adeonellopsis transversa
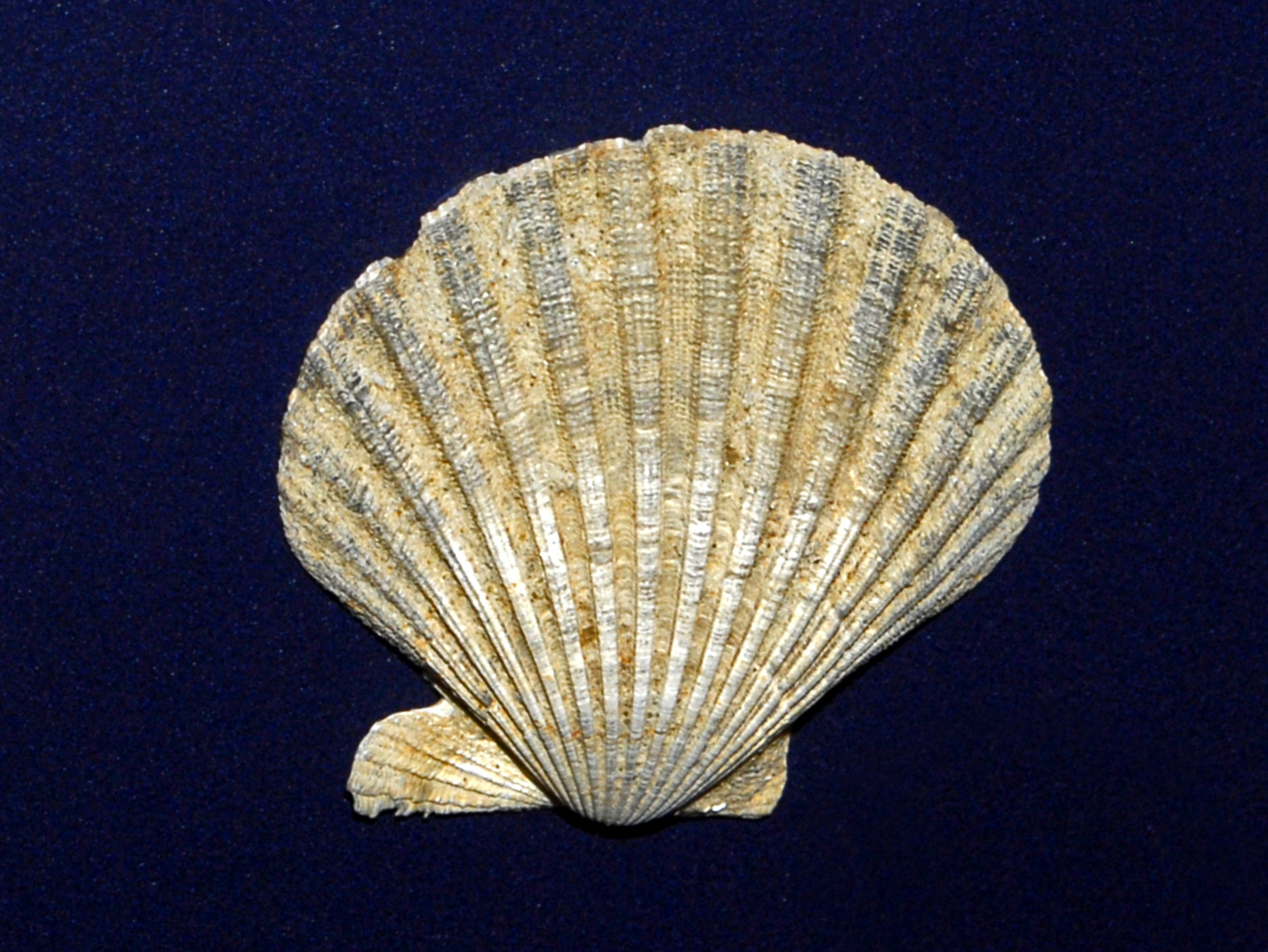
- Fossilized shell of the Triassic-modern scallop Aequipecten
  Aequipecten
  - †Aequipecten cocoana
  - †Aequipecten redwoodensis – type locality for species
  - †Aequipecten spillmani
- Aetobatus
- Agaronia
  - †Agaronia alabamensis
  - †Agaronia media
  - †Agaronia mississippiensis
- Agatrix
  - †Agatrix mississippiensis
- Alaba
  - †Alaba blakneyensis
  - †Alaba macneili – type locality for species
- Alabina
  - †Alabina menthafontis – type locality for species
- Albula
  - †Albula eppsi
- Alderina
  - †Alderina lunata
  - †Alderina pulcherrima
- Alligator
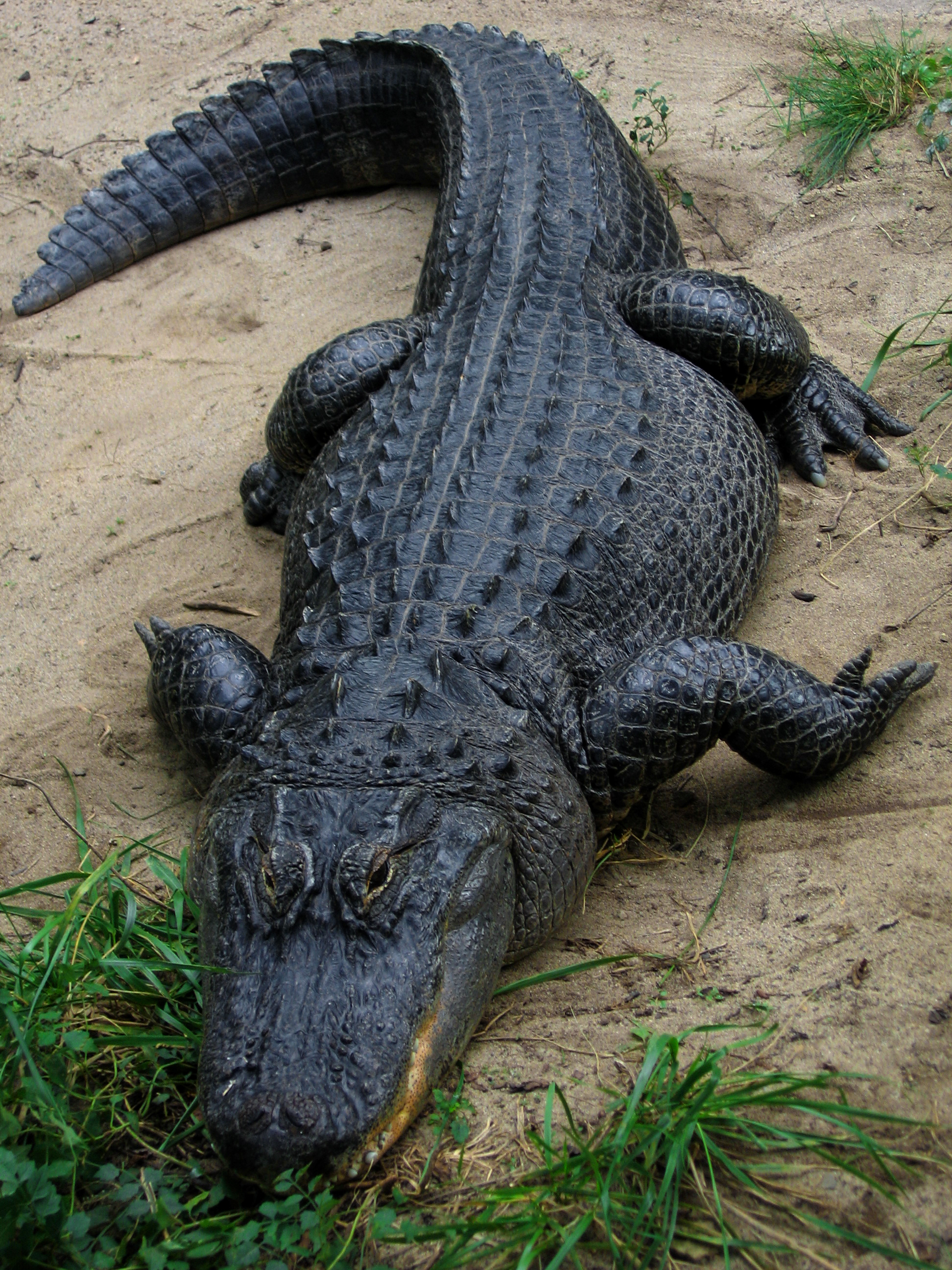
  - A living Alligator mississippiensis, or American alligator
    †Alligator mississippiensis
- †Altrix
  - †Altrix altior
- †Alveinus
  - †Alveinus minutus
- Americardia
  - †Americardia silvacollina – type locality for species
- Ammonia
  - †Ammonia beccarii
- †Amonia
  - †Amonia microstriata – type locality for species
- Anadara
  - †Anadara lesueuri
  - †Anadara vaughani
- Ancilla
  - †Ancilla staminea
- Anodontia
  - †Anodontia mississippiensis
- Anomia
  - †Anomia lisbonensis
  - †Anomia microstriata – type locality for species
- †Anomotodon
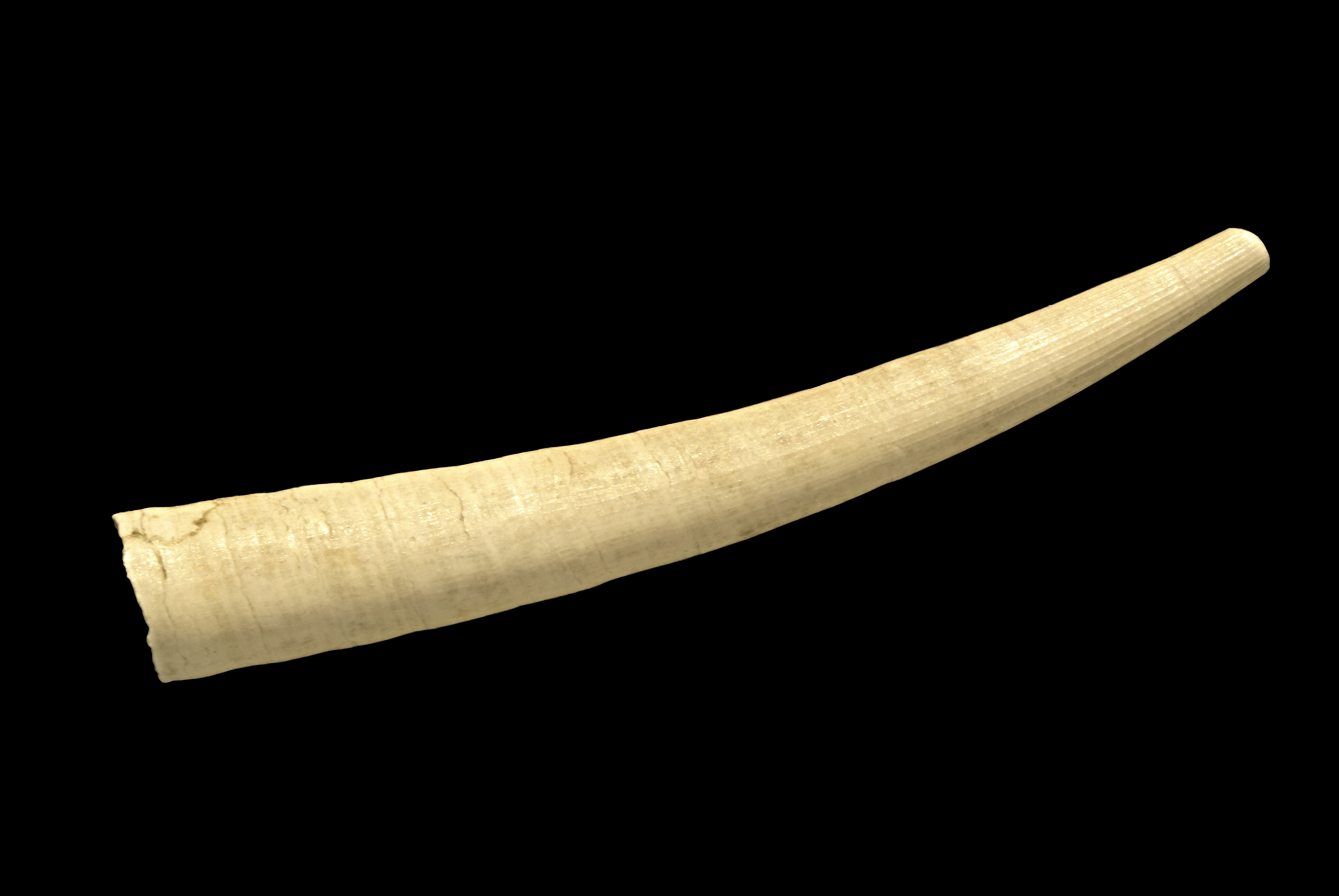
- A shell of an Antalis tusk shell
  Antalis
  - †Antalis danvillense
  - †Antalis minutistriatum
  - †Antalis mississippiense
  - †Antalis thalloides
- Antropora
  - †Antropora duplex
  - †Antropora lowei – type locality for species
  - †Antropora pyriforme
- †Apatemys
  - †Apatemys pygmaeus – type locality for species
- Apiotoma
  - †Apiotoma palmerae – type locality for species
- Aporrhais
  - †Aporrhais lirata
  - †Aporrhais menthafontis – type locality for species
- Arachnopusia
  - †Arachnopusia vicksburgica
- †Arbia
  - †Arbia aldrichi
- †Archaeomanta
  - †Archaeomanta melenhorsti
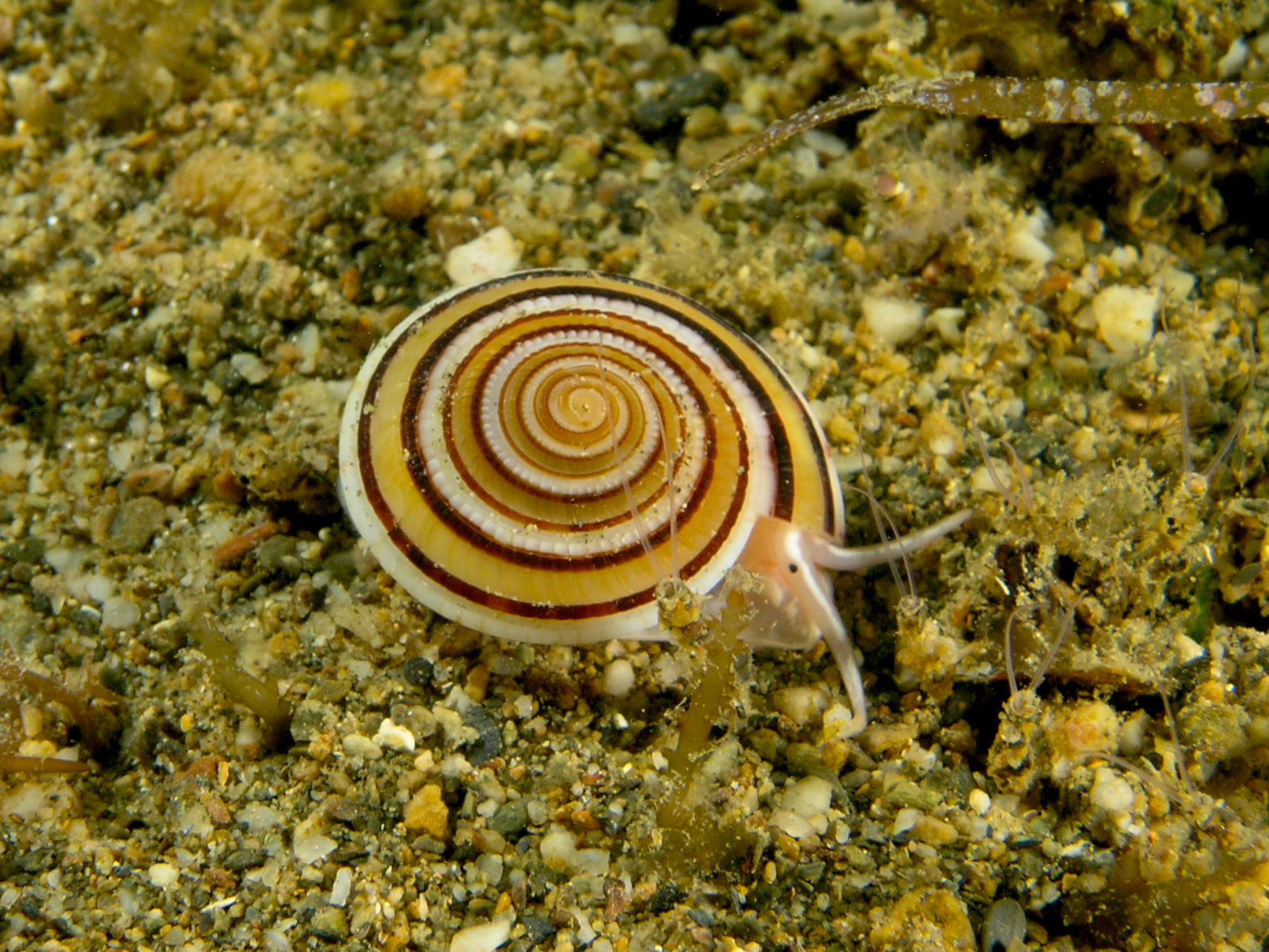
- A living Architectonica staircase shell sea snail
  Architectonica
  - †Architectonica acuta
  - †Architectonica aldrichi
  - †Architectonica alveatum
  - †Architectonica amoena
  - †Architectonica bellistriata
  - †Architectonica billmoorei – type locality for species
  - †Architectonica cossmanni
  - †Architectonica elaborata
  - †Architectonica fungina
  - †Architectonica hargeri
  - †Architectonica leana
  - †Architectonica meekana
  - †Architectonica meliconae
  - †Architectonica ornata
  - †Architectonica textilina
  - †Architectonica trilirata
- Arcopagia
  - †Arcopagia eburneopsis
  - †Arcopagia raveneli
  - †Arcopagia trumani
- Arcoperna
  - †Arcoperna filosa
  - †Arcoperna linteata – type locality for species
- Arene
  - †Arene nodosa – type locality for species
- Arius
- Astarte
  - †Astarte menthifontis – type locality for species
  - †Astarte newtonensis
  - †Astarte planilamella – type locality for species
  - †Astarte triangulata
- Asthenotoma
  - †Asthenotoma danvitexa
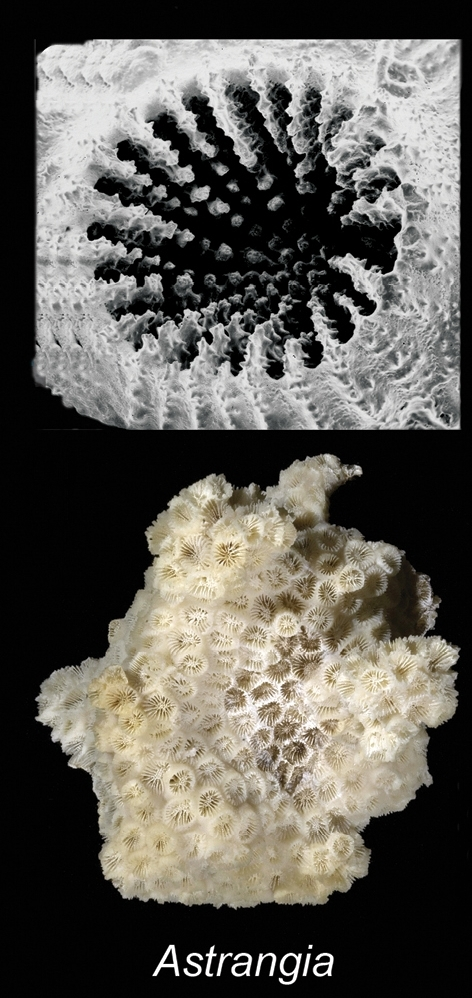
- Electron micrograph and gross view of an Astrangia stony coral
  Astrangia
  - †Astrangia expansa – type locality for species
  - †Astrangia harrisi
- †Astrhelia
  - †Astrhelia burnsi – type locality for species
  - †Astrhelia neglecta – type locality for species
- Athleta
  - †Athleta lisbonensis
  - †Athleta petrosa
  - †Athleta symmetricus
  - †Athleta triplicatus
  - †Athleta tuomeyi
- Atrina
  - †Atrina argentea
  - †Atrina jacksoniana
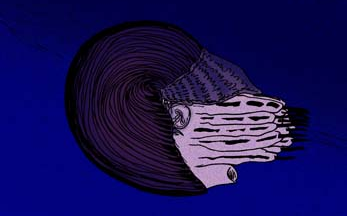
- Restoration of the Paleocene-Miocene nautiloid cephalopod Aturia
  †Aturia
  - †Aturia alabamensis
  - †Aturia berryi
  - †Aturia richardsi – type locality for species
- Atys
  - †Atys caseyi – type locality for species
  - †Atys pinguis – type locality for species
- †Austrocypraea
  - †Austrocypraea towncreekensis – type locality for species
- Axelella
  - †Axelella elongata – type locality for species

== B ==
- Balanophyllia
  - †Balanophyllia elongata – type locality for species
  - †Balanophyllia haleana
  - †Balanophyllia irrorata
- Balcis
  - †Balcis notata
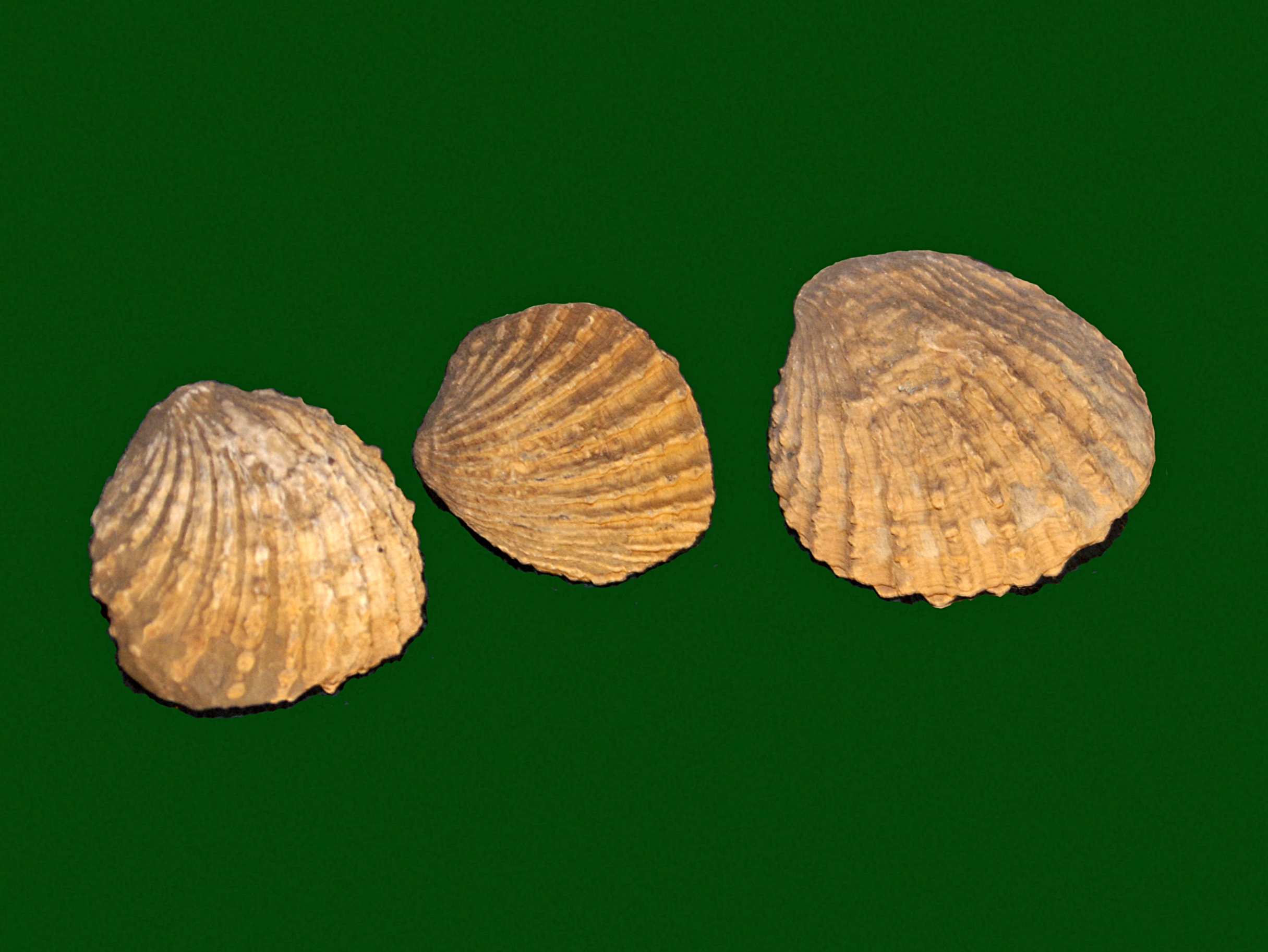
- Three fossilized shells of the Late Cretaceous-Eocene marine bivalve Baluchicardia
  †Baluchicardia
  - †Baluchicardia greggiana
- Barbatia
  - †Barbatia aspera
  - †Barbatia cuculloides
  - †Barbatia lima
  - †Barbatia ludoviciana
  - †Barbatia mississippiensis
  - †Barbatia paradiagona – type locality for species
  - †Barbatia seraperta
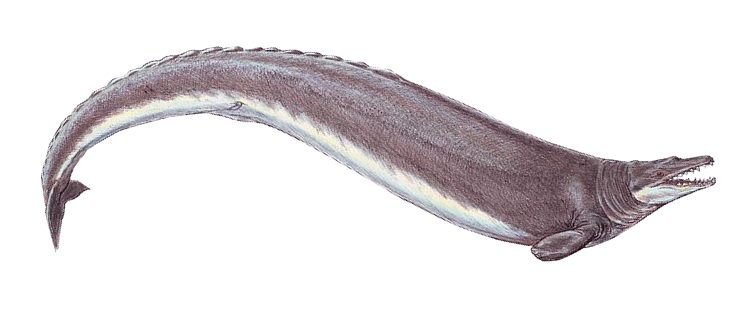
- Life restoration of the Eocene whale Basilosaurus
  †Basilosaurus
  - †Basilosaurus cetoides
- †Bathycyathus – type locality for genus
  - †Bathycyathus pulcher – type locality for species
- Bathytoma
  - †Bathytoma congesta
  - †Bathytoma rhomboidea – type locality for species
- Bathytormus
  - †Bathytormus clarkensis
  - †Bathytormus flexurus
  - †Bathytormus productus
- †Bayania
  - †Bayania secale
- †Belemnosella
  - †Belemnosella americana
- †Belosaepia
- †Biocorbula
  - †Biocorbula pearlensis
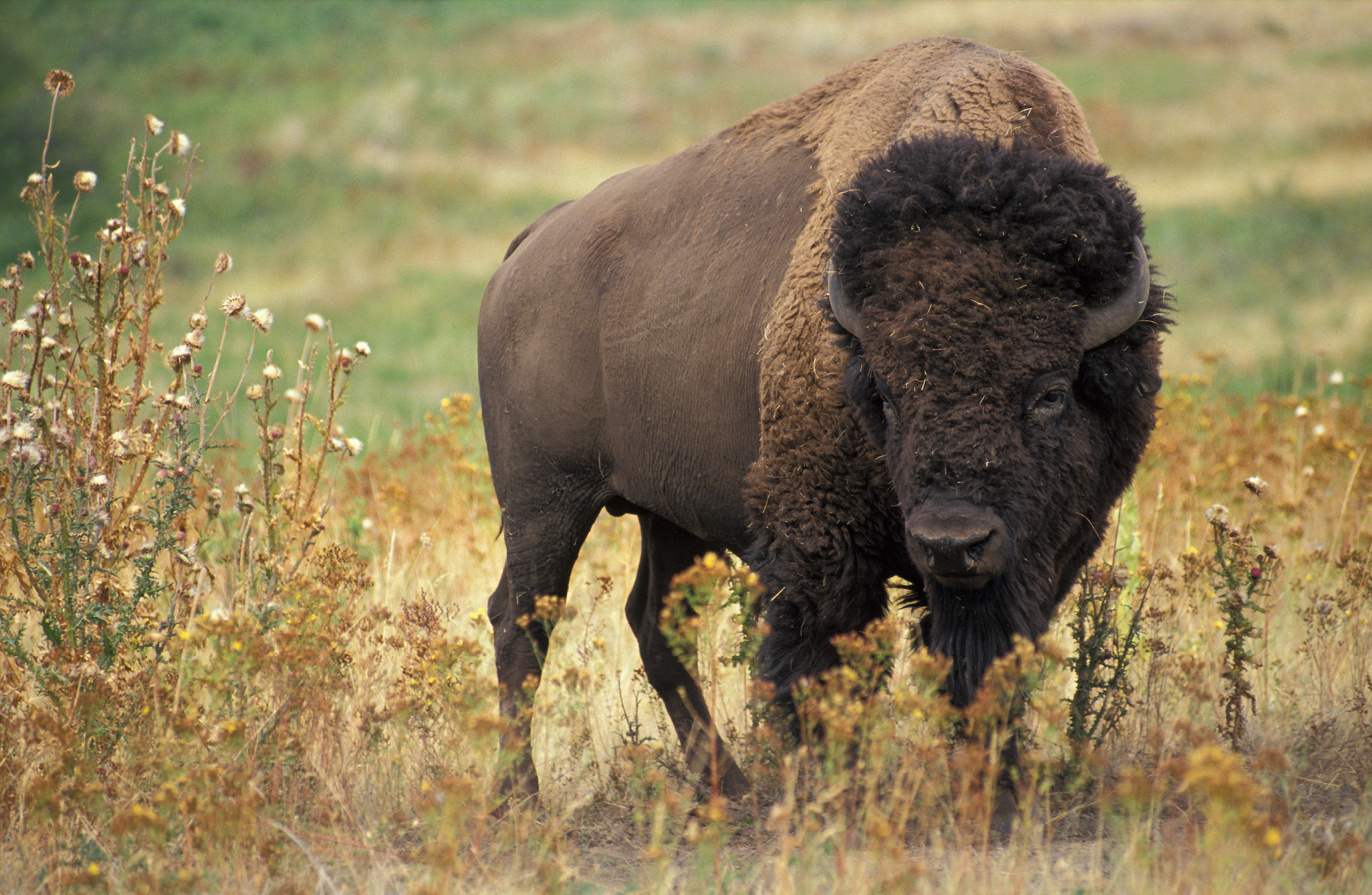
- A living Bison
  Bison
- Bittium
  - †Bittium koeneni
  - †Bittium ottoi – type locality for species
- †Bonellitia
  - †Bonellitia bastropensis
  - †Bonellitia elevata
  - †Bonellitia garvani
  - †Bonellitia jacksonica
  - †Bonellitia parilis
- Bornia
  - †Bornia tallahalaensis – type locality for species
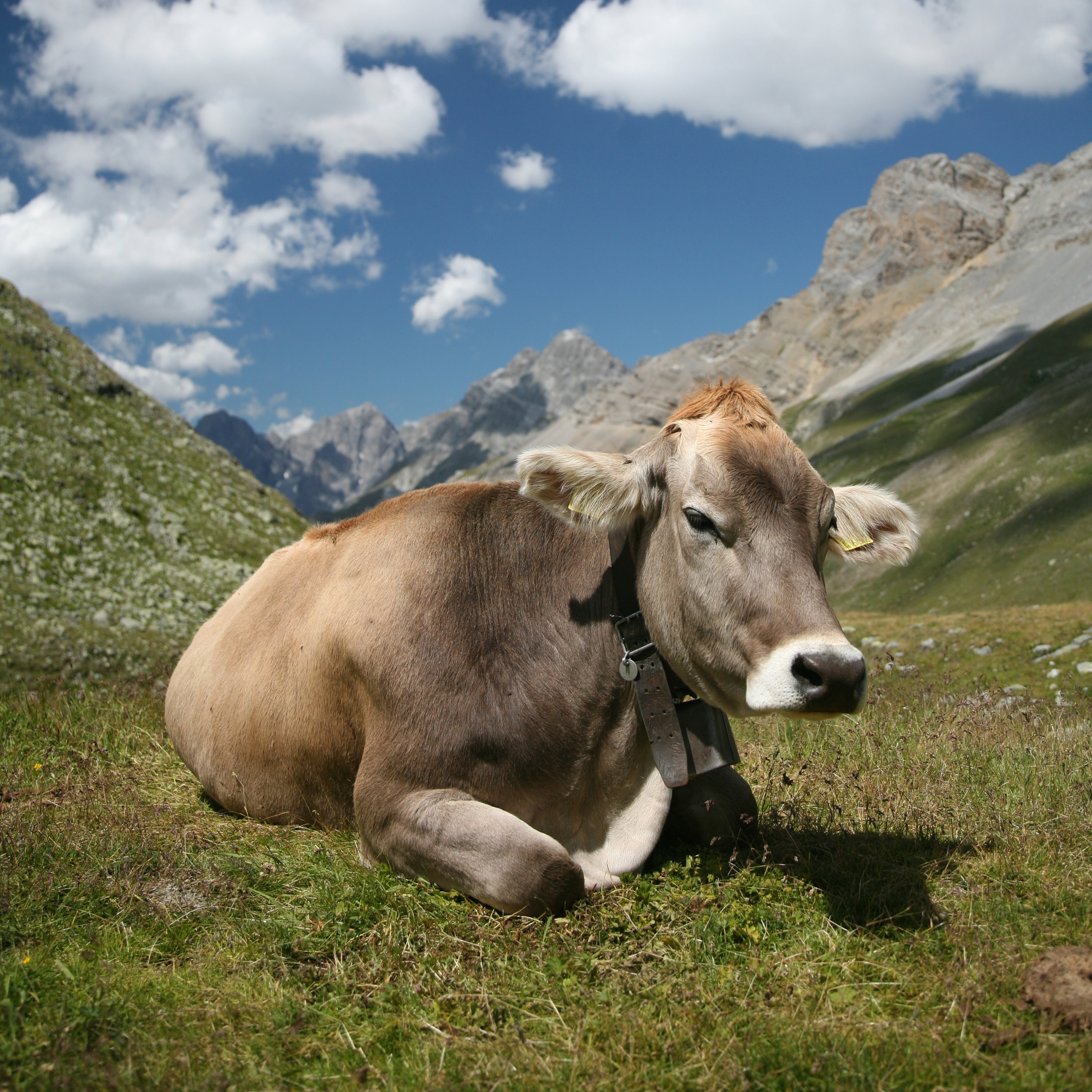
- Bos
  Bos
- †Bovicornu
  - †Bovicornu eocenense
  - †Bovicornu gracile
- Brachidontes
  - †Brachidontes mississippiensis
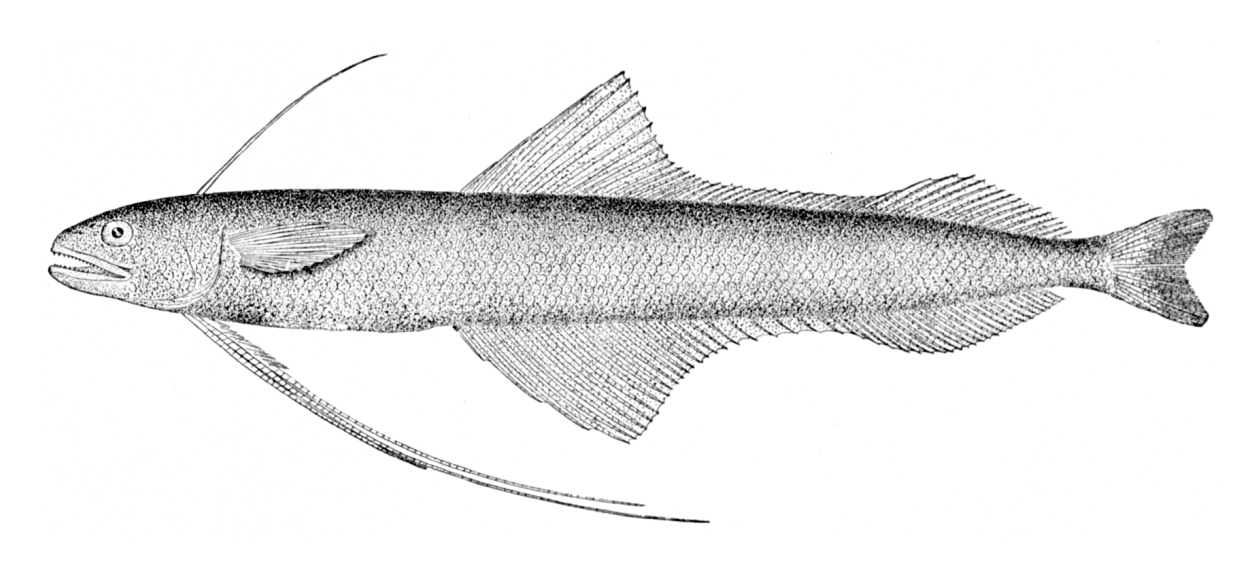
- Illustration of a living Bregmaceros, or codlet
  Bregmaceros
- †Brevinucula
  - †Brevinucula pseudopunctata – type locality for species
- †Bristocorbula
  - †Bristocorbula fossata
- Brizalina
  - †Brizalina marginata
- †Brychaetus
  - †Brychaetus muelleri
- Buliminella
  - †Buliminella bassendorfensis – or unidentified comparable form
  - †Buliminella elegantissima
- Bulla
  - †Bulla calluspira
- Bullia
  - †Bullia ancillops
- †Burnhamia
  - †Burnhamia daviesi
  - †Burnhamia fetahi
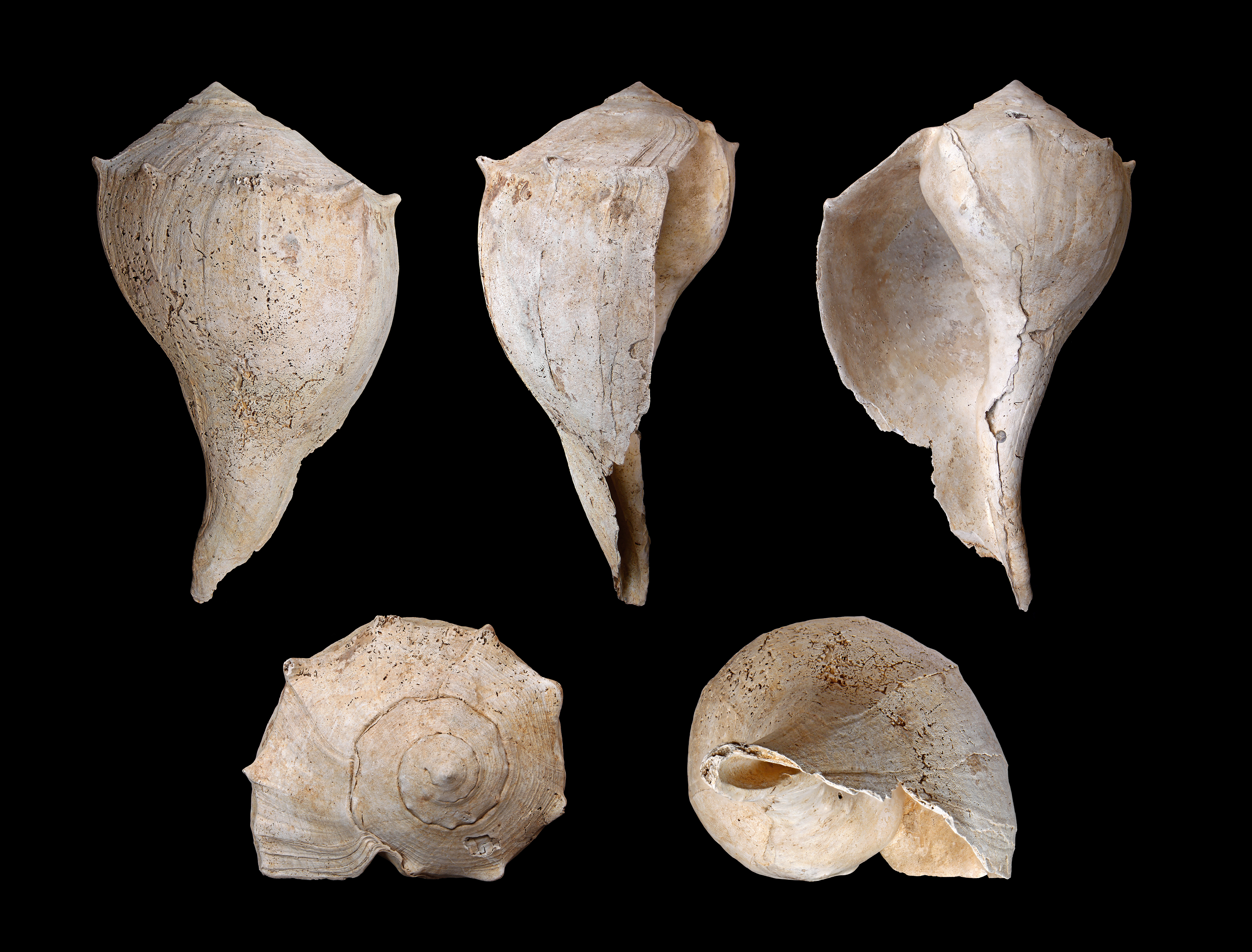
- Fossilized shell in multiple views of a Busycon sea snail
  Busycon
  - †Busycon branneri

== C ==
- Cadulus
  - †Cadulus abruptus
  - †Cadulus corpulentus
  - †Cadulus jacksonensis
  - †Cadulus juvenis
  - †Cadulus newtonensis
  - †Cadulus quadriturritus
  - †Cadulus vicksburgensis
- Caecum
  - †Caecum alterum
  - †Caecum solitarium
- Caestocorbula
  - †Caestocorbula fossata
  - †Caestocorbula wailesiana
- Callianassa
  - †Callianassa Sp. informal
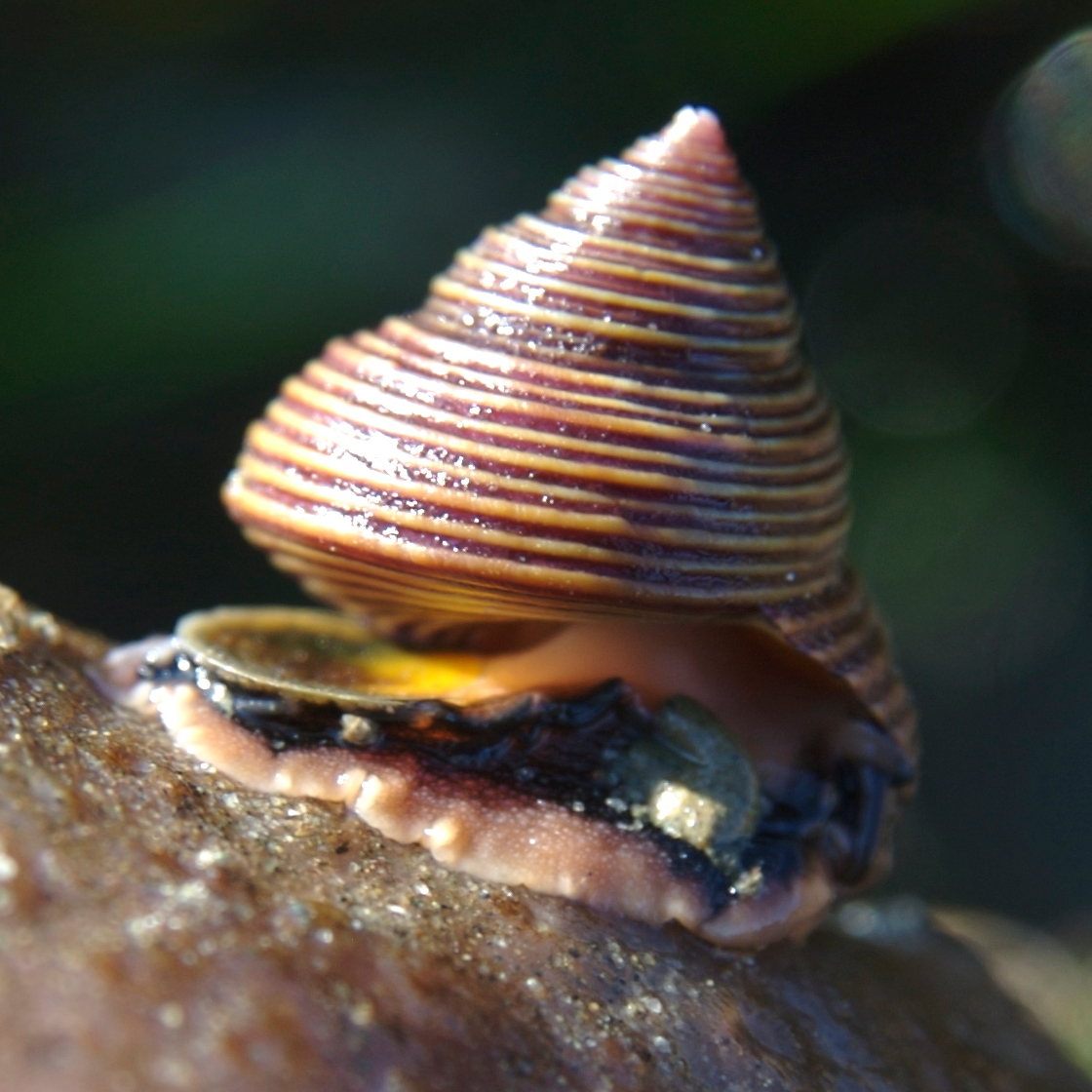
- A living Calliostoma top sea snail
  Calliostoma
- Callista
  - †Callista annexa
  - †Callista goniopisthus – type locality for species
  - †Callista pearlensis
  - †Callista perlensis
  - †Callista perovata
  - †Callista sobrina
- Callopora
  - †Callopora filoparietis
  - †Callopora ingens
  - †Callopora mundula
  - †Callopora tenuirostris
- Callucina
  - †Callucina choctavensis
- †Calorhadia
  - †Calorhadia albirupina
  - †Calorhadia aldrichiana
  - †Calorhadia elongatoidea
  - †Calorhadia opulenta
  - †Calorhadia pharcida
  - †Calorhadia reginajacksonis
- Calotrophon
  - †Calotrophon ostrearum
- †Calpurna
  - †Calpurna cookei – type locality for species
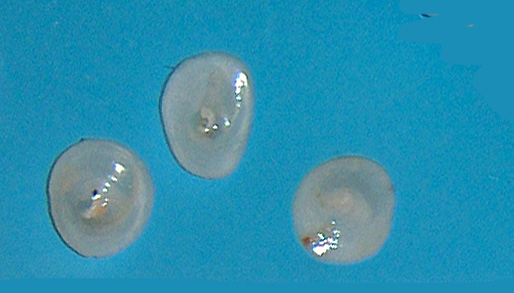
- Three modern shells of Calyptraea, or Chinese hat snails
  Calyptraea
  - †Calyptraea alta
- †Calyptraphorus
  - †Calyptraphorus stamineus
  - †Calyptraphorus trinodiferus
  - †Calyptraphorus velatus
- Cantharus
- Capulus
  - †Capulus americanus
  - †Capulus langdoni – type locality for species
  - †Capulus planus
- Carcharhinus
  - †Carcharhinus gibbesi
- Carcharias
  - †Carcharias hoperi
  - †Carcharias robustus
  - †Carcharias teretidens
  - †Carcharias verticalis
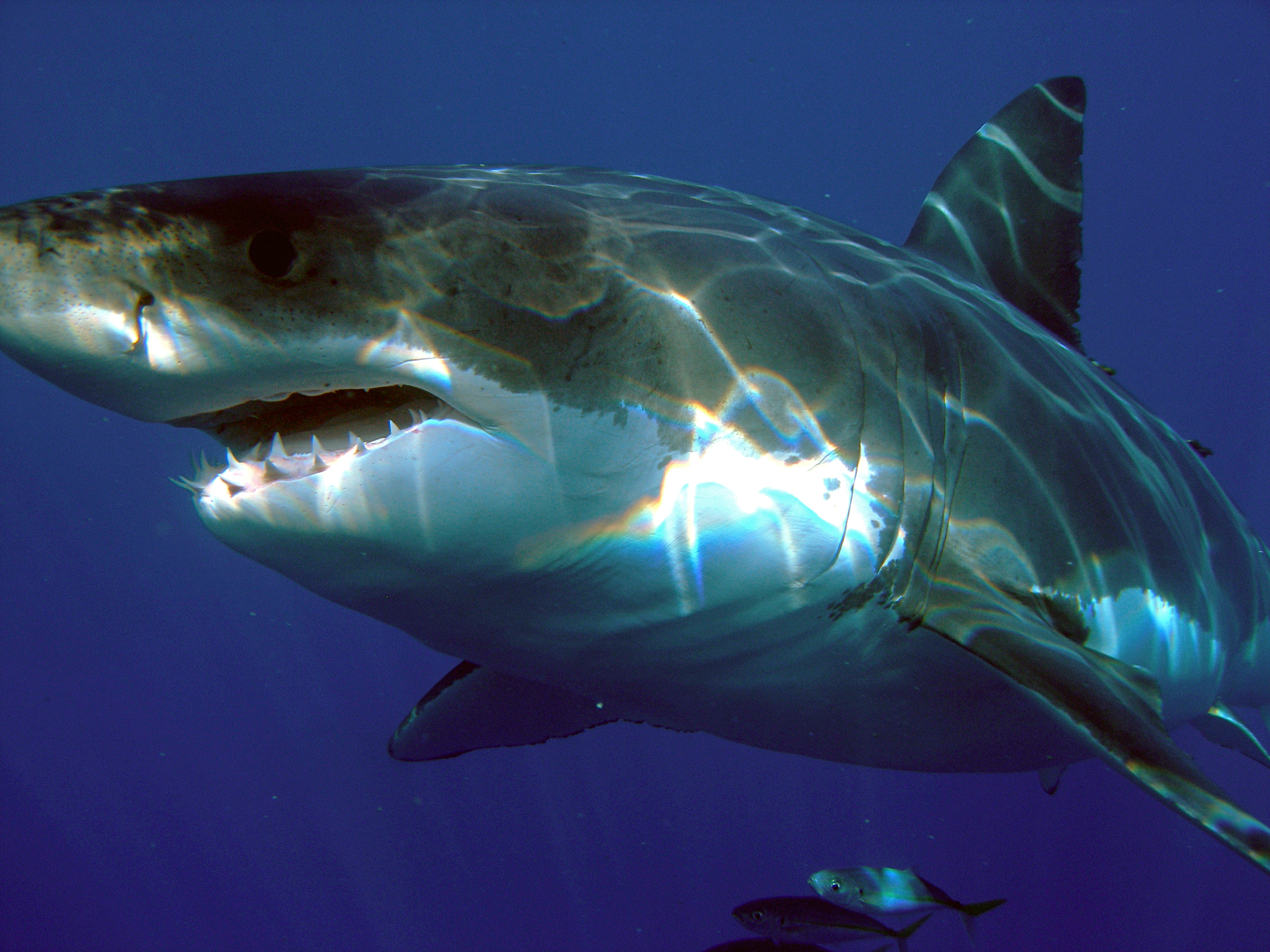
- A living Carcharodon shark
  Carcharodon
  - †Carcharodon auriculatus
- †Carditella
  - †Carditella aldrichi
- †Caricella
  - †Caricella demissa
  - †Caricella fenestra
  - †Caricella howei
  - †Caricella polita
  - †Caricella pyruloides
  - †Caricella reticulata
  - †Caricella stenzeli
  - †Caricella subangulata
  - †Caricella turneri
- Caryocorbula
  - †Caryocorbula densata
  - †Caryocorbula deusseni
  - †Caryocorbula engonatoides
  - †Caryocorbula willistoni
- Cassis
  - †Cassis flintensis
- Cavilinga
  - †Cavilinga imbricolamella – type locality for species
  - †Cavilinga triloba – type locality for species
- Celleporaria
  - †Celleporaria damicornis
  - †Celleporaria fissurata
  - †Celleporaria granulosa
  - †Celleporaria peristomata – type locality for species
- Celleporina
  - †Celleporina globosa
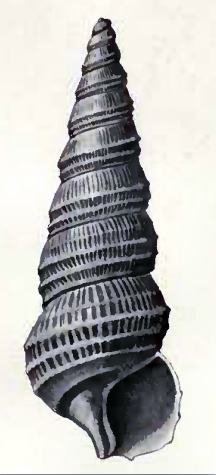
- Illustration of a shell of a Cerithiella cerith sea snail
  Cerithiella
  - †Cerithiella heckscheri
  - †Cerithiella jacksonensis
  - †Cerithiella langdoni
  - †Cerithiella nassula
  - †Cerithiella nassuloides – type locality for species
  - †Cerithiella preconica
- †Cerithioderma
- Cervus
- Chama
  - †Chama harrisi
  - †Chama mississippiensis
  - †Chama monroensis
  - †Chama pappiladerma – type locality for species
  - †Chama radiata
- Chamelea
  - †Chamelea mississippiensis
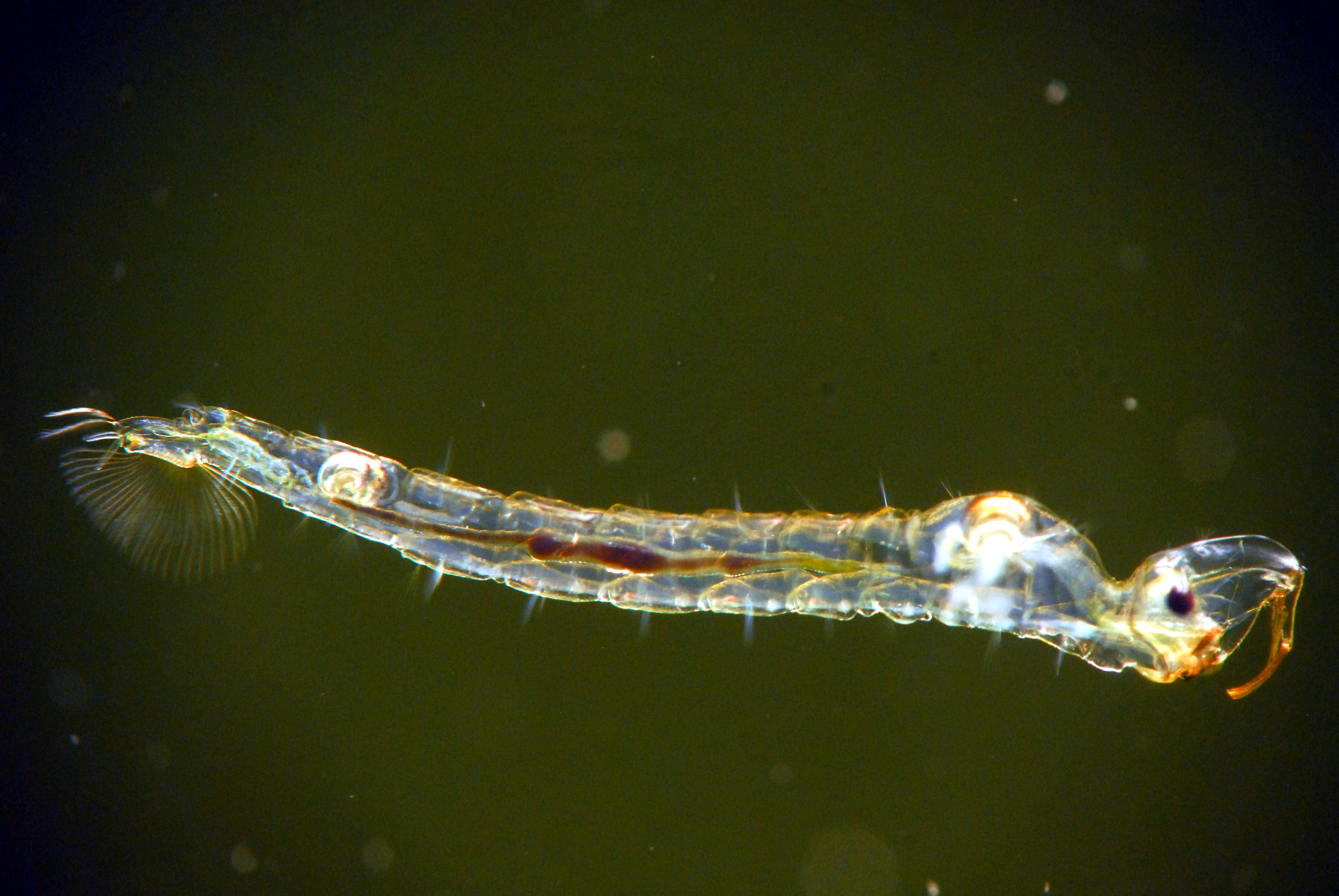
- Chaoborus
  Chaoborus
- Chelonibia
  - †Chelonibia melleni – type locality for species
- Chicoreus
  - †Chicoreus dormani
  - †Chicoreus mississippiensis
  - †Chicoreus stetopus
- Chione
  - †Chione craspedonta
  - †Chione perbrevisformis – type locality for species
- Chionopsis
  - †Chionopsis bainbridgensis
- Chiton
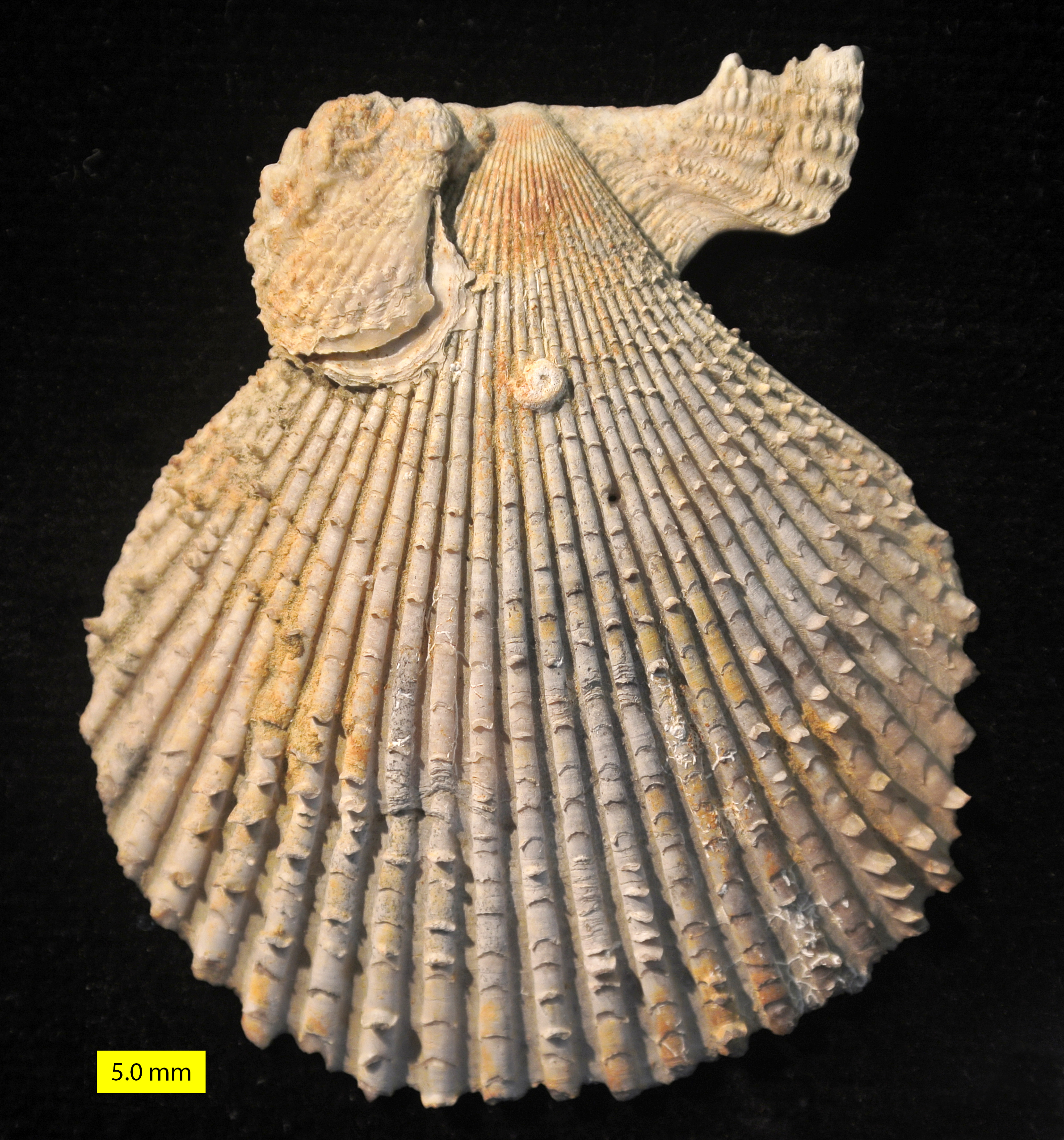
- Fossillized shell of a Chlamys bivalve
  Chlamys
  - †Chlamys anatipes
  - †Chlamys burlesonensis
  - †Chlamys cainei
  - †Chlamys choctavensis
  - †Chlamys clarkeana
  - †Chlamys cocoana
  - †Chlamys danvillensis
  - †Chlamys ducanensis
  - †Chlamys nupera
  - †Chlamys pulchricosta
  - †Chlamys spillmani
  - †Chlamys wahtubbeana
  - †Chlamys wahtubbeanus – or unidentified comparable form
- †Choctawius – type locality for genus
  - †Choctawius foxi – type locality for species
- †Cimomia
  - †Cimomia subrecta
  - †Cimomia vestali
- Circulus
  - †Circulus ottonius
  - †Circulus sotoensis
- Cirsotrema
  - †Cirsotrema danvillense
  - †Cirsotrema linteum
  - †Cirsotrema nassulum
  - †Cirsotrema newtonense
  - †Cirsotrema newtonensis
  - †Cirsotrema ranellinum
  - †Cirsotrema spillmani
- Clathurella
  - †Clathurella blakneyensis
- Clava
  - †Clava menthafontis – type locality for species
  - †Clava silvacollinis – type locality for species
- †Clavidrupa
  - †Clavidrupa anita
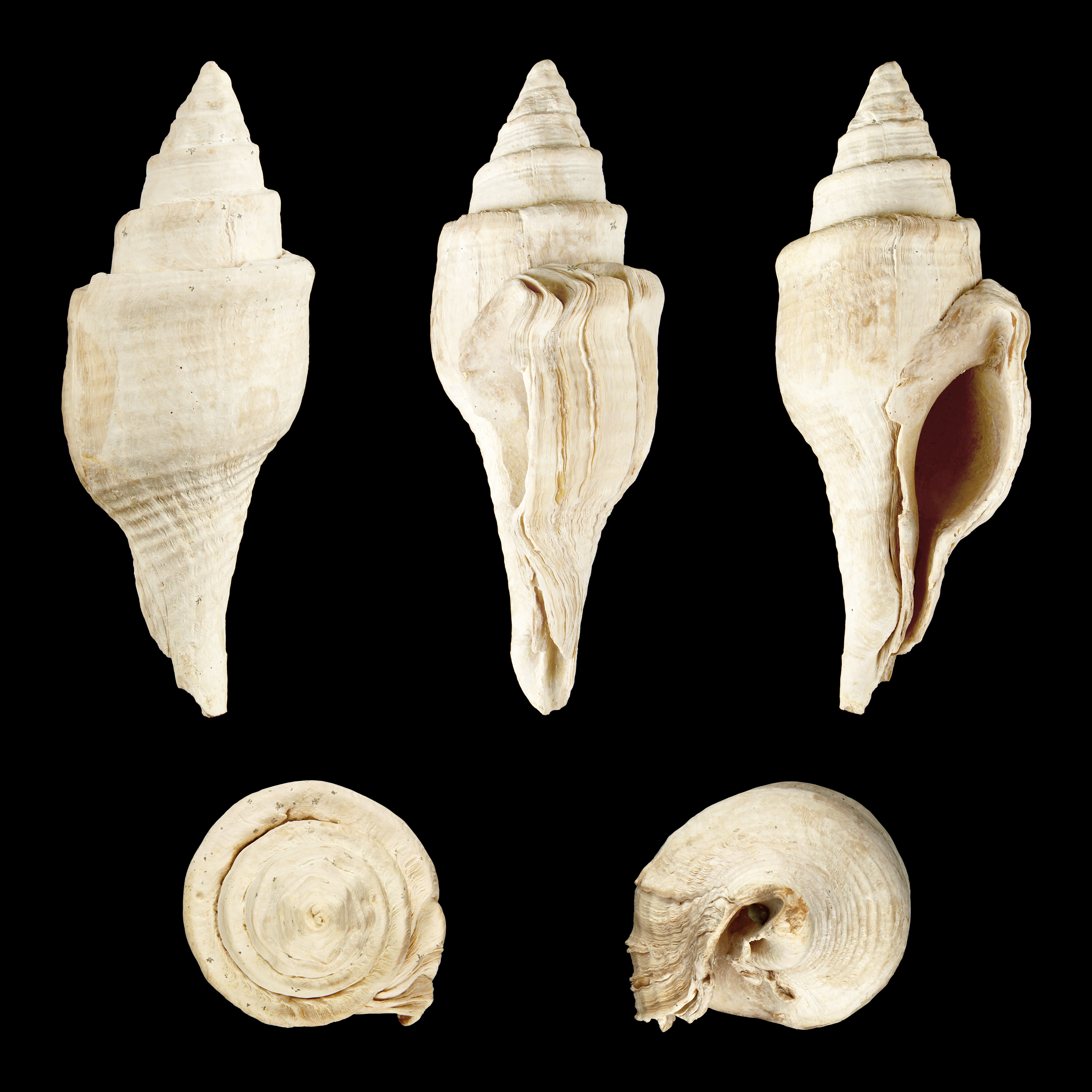
- Multiple views of a fossilized shell of the Paleocene-Pliocene spindle sea snail Clavilithes
  Clavilithes
  - †Clavilithes columbaris
  - †Clavilithes hubbardanus
  - †Clavilithes humerosus
  - †Clavilithes kennedyanus
  - †Clavilithes longiformis
  - †Clavilithes penrosei
  - †Clavilithes texanus
  - †Clavilithes vicksburgensis
- Clio
  - †Clio simplex
- Closia
  - †Closia larvata
  - †Closia semen
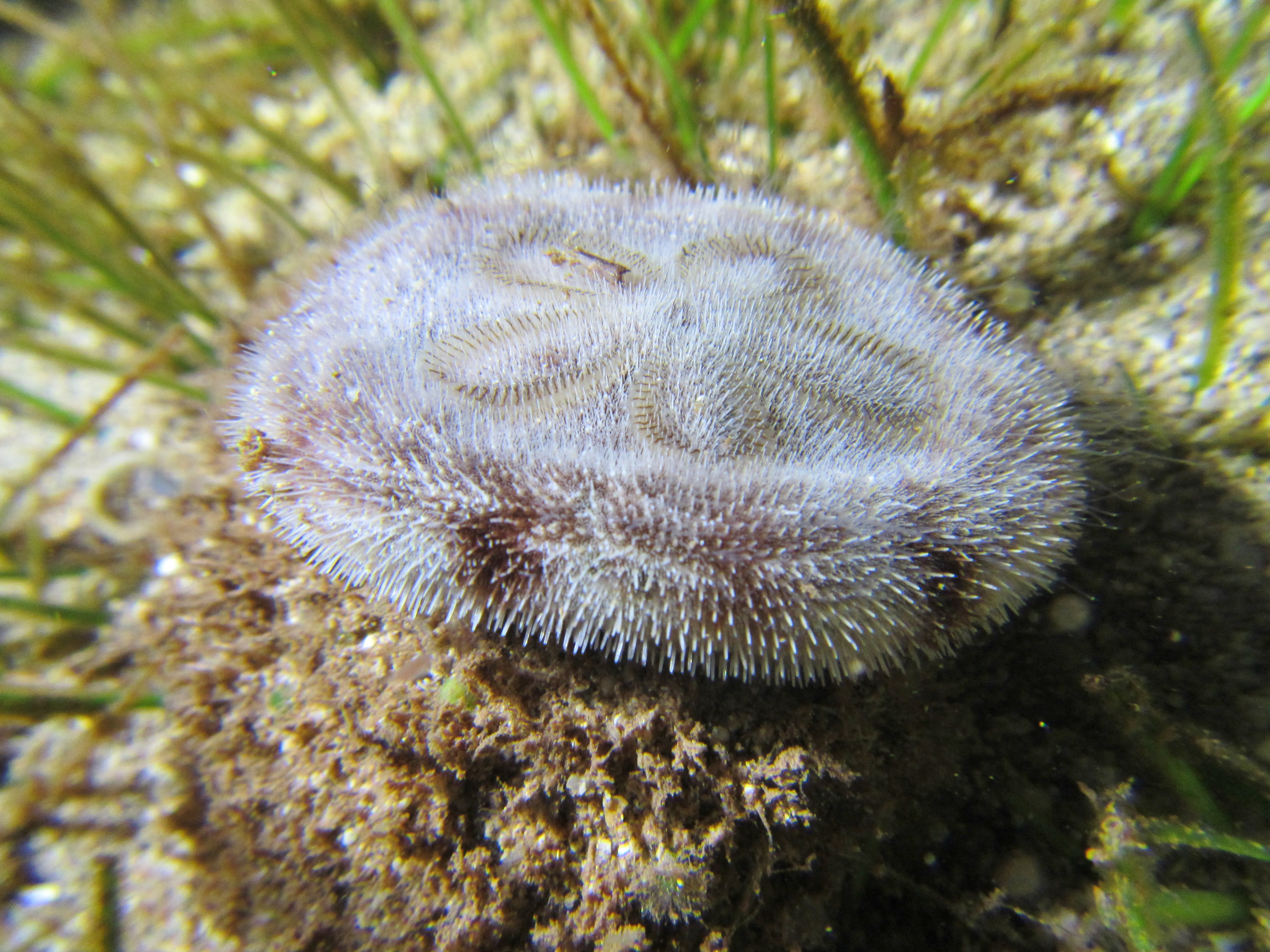
- A living Clypeaster, or sea biscuit
  Clypeaster
  - †Clypeaster rogersi
- Cochlespira
  - †Cochlespira bella
  - †Cochlespira columbaria
  - †Cochlespira cookei – type locality for species
  - †Cochlespira cristata - type species; combinatio nova for Pleurotoma cristata.
  - †Cochlespira engonata
- †Cochlespiropsis
  - †Cochlespiropsis engonata
- Codakia
- †Colpocherus – type locality for genus
  - †Colpocherus mississippiensis – type locality for species
- Columbellopsis
  - †Columbellopsis mississippiensis
- †Confusiscala
  - †Confusiscala durhami – type locality for species
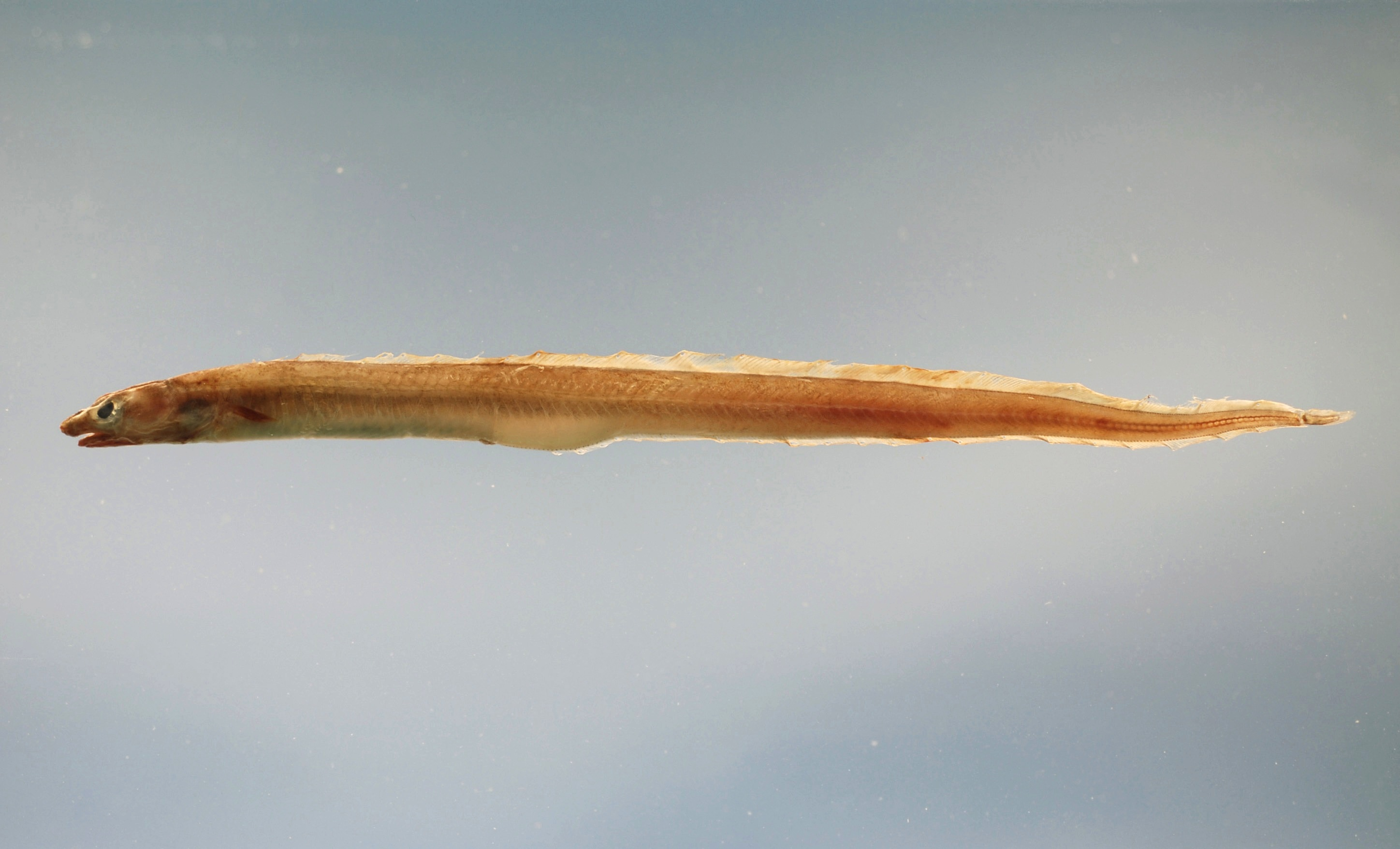
- A living Conger
  Conger
  - †Conger meridies
  - †Conger vetustus
- †Congeris
  - †Congeris brevior
- Conomitra – tentative report
- Conomitra
  - †Conomitra crenulata
  - †Conomitra hammakeri
  - †Conomitra jacksonensis
  - †Conomitra staminea
  - †Conomitra texana
  - †Conomitra vicksburgensis
- Conopeum
  - †Conopeum arborescens
  - †Conopeum concavum – type locality for species
  - †Conopeum damicornis
  - †Conopeum hookeri
  - †Conopeum lacroiriir
  - †Conopeum lamellosum
- †Conorbis
  - †Conorbis alatoideus
  - †Conorbis porcellanus
- Conus
  - †Conus protractus
  - †Conus sauridens
  - †Conus smithvillensis
- Coralliophaga
  - †Coralliophaga corrugata – type locality for species
- Coralliophila
  - †Coralliophila aldrichi
- †Corbarimys
  - †Corbarimys nomadus – type locality for species
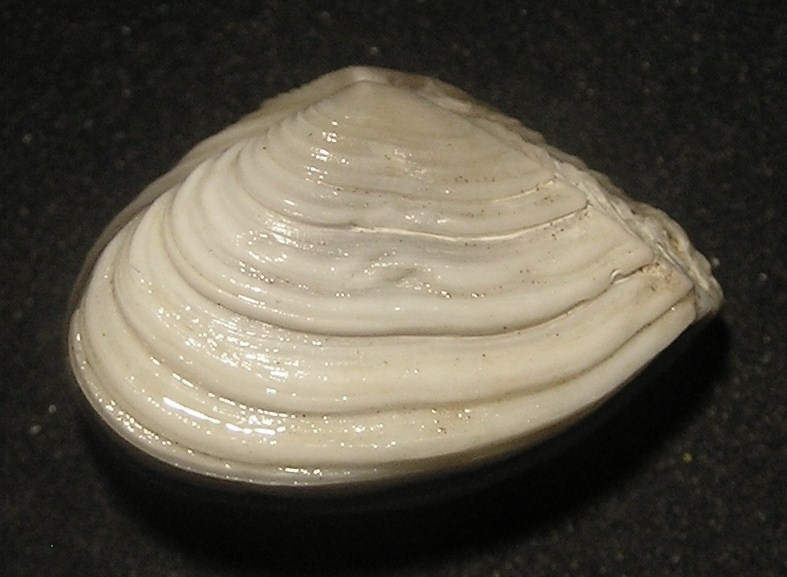
- Shell of a Corbula basket clam
  Corbula
  - †Corbula alabamiensis
  - †Corbula concha
  - †Corbula engonata
  - †Corbula extenuata
  - †Corbula laqueata
  - †Corbula rufaripa – type locality for species
- Cordieria
  - †Cordieria biconica
  - †Cordieria ludoviciana
- †Cornulina
  - †Cornulina dalli
  - †Cornulina minax
- †Coronia
  - †Coronia alternata
  - †Coronia ancilla
  - †Coronia casteri
  - †Coronia childreni
  - †Coronia conjuncta
  - †Coronia margaritosa
  - †Coronia montgomeryensis
  - †Coronia nodulina
  - †Coronia tenella
- †Corvina
  - †Corvina gemma
  - †Corvina intermedia
  - †Corvina pseudoradians – type locality for species
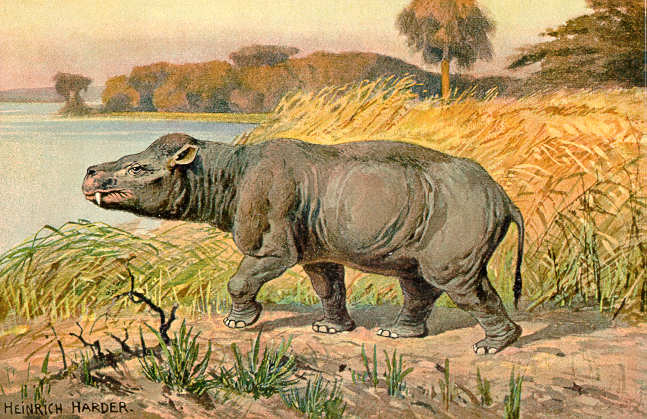
- Life restoration of the Paleocene-Eocene pantodont mammal Coryphodon. Heinrich Harder (1920).
  †Coryphodon
- Costacallista – or unidentified comparable form
  - †Costacallista mortoni
- †Coupatezia
  - †Coupatezia woutersi
- Crassatella
  - †Crassatella aquiana
  - †Crassatella gabbi
  - †Crassatella lirasculpta – type locality for species
  - †Crassatella mississippiensis
  - †Crassatella negreetensis
  - †Crassatella texalta
  - †Crassatella texana
  - †Crassatella trapaquara
- Crassinella
  - †Crassinella pygmaea
  - †Crassinella pygmeae
  - †Crassinella variablis – type locality for species
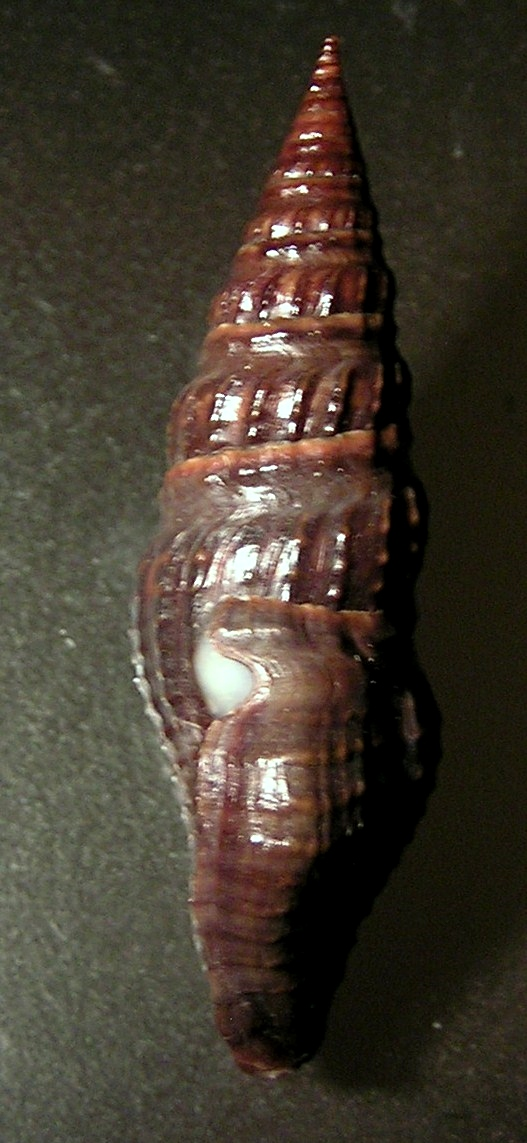
- Shell of a Crassispira sea snail
  Crassispira
  - †Crassispira abundans
  - †Crassispira lyopleura – type locality for species
- †Crassitella
  - †Crassitella mississippiensis
- Crassostrea
- Crenella
  - †Crenella fenestra – type locality for species
  - †Crenella isocardioides
  - †Crenella tenuis
- Crenilabium
  - †Crenilabium altispira – type locality for species
- Crepidula
  - †Crepidula dumosa
  - †Crepidula lirata
- Creseis
  - †Creseis corpulenta
  - †Creseis simplex
  - †Creseis spina
- †Cresies
  - †Cresies corpulenta – or unidentified comparable form
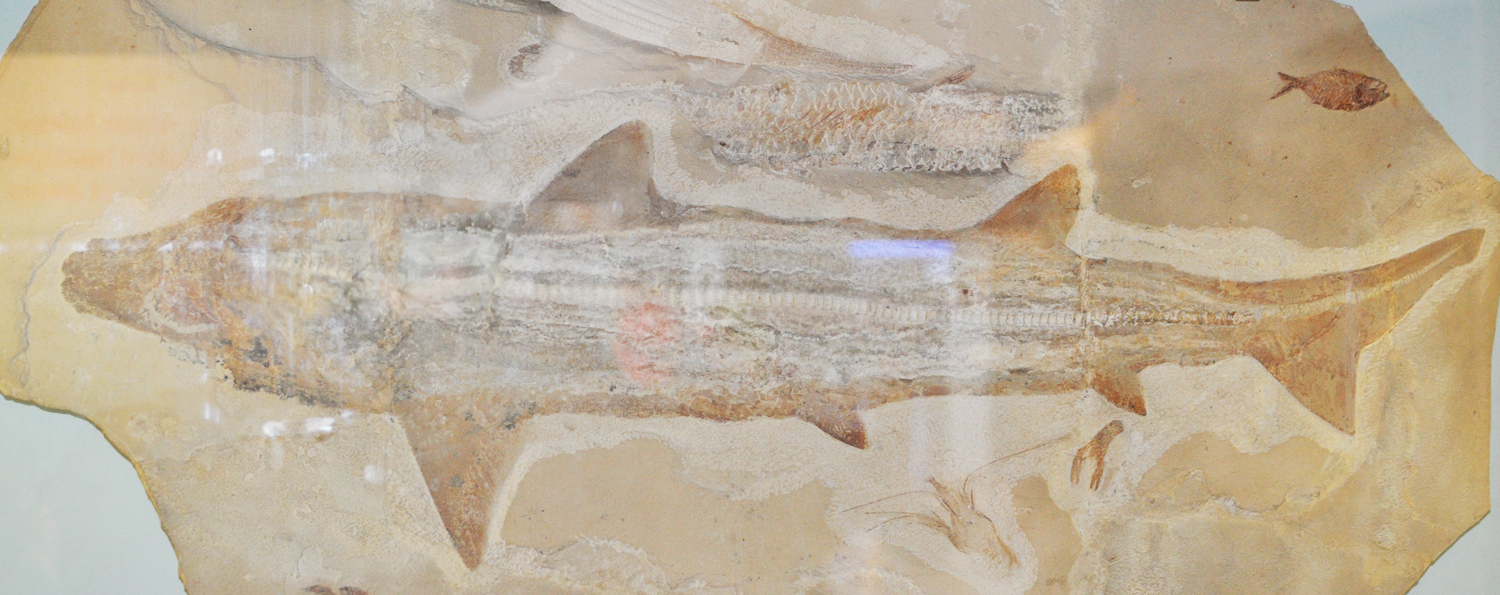
- Fossil of the Early Cretaceous-Eocene shark Cretolamna
  †Cretolamna
  - †Cretolamna aschersoni
  - †Cretolamna lerichei
- Crisia
  - †Crisia cribraria
  - †Crisia hornesi
  - †Crisia lowei
- †Crommium
  - †Crommium jacksonense
- †Cubitostrea
  - †Cubitostrea divaricata
  - †Cubitostrea lisbonensis
  - †Cubitostrea perplicata
  - †Cubitostrea sellaeformis
- Cuna – tentative report
  - †Cuna astartoides
- †Cuneocorbula
  - †Cuneocorbula subengonata
- Cuspidaria
  - †Cuspidaria multiornata
- †Cyclichna
  - †Cyclichna acutiscapulae – type locality for species
  - †Cyclichna nida – type locality for species
- Cyclostremiscus
  - †Cyclostremiscus exacuus
  - †Cyclostremiscus menthafons – type locality for species
  - †Cyclostremiscus quadracordata – type locality for species
- Cylichna
  - †Cylichna nida – type locality for species
- Cylichnella
  - †Cylichnella bitruncata
- †Cylindracanthus
  - †Cylindracanthus rectus
- Cymatium
  - †Cymatium vicksburgense – type locality for species
- Cymatosyrinx
  - †Cymatosyrinx dorseyi
  - †Cymatosyrinx palmerae
- Cymia
  - †Cymia subalveata
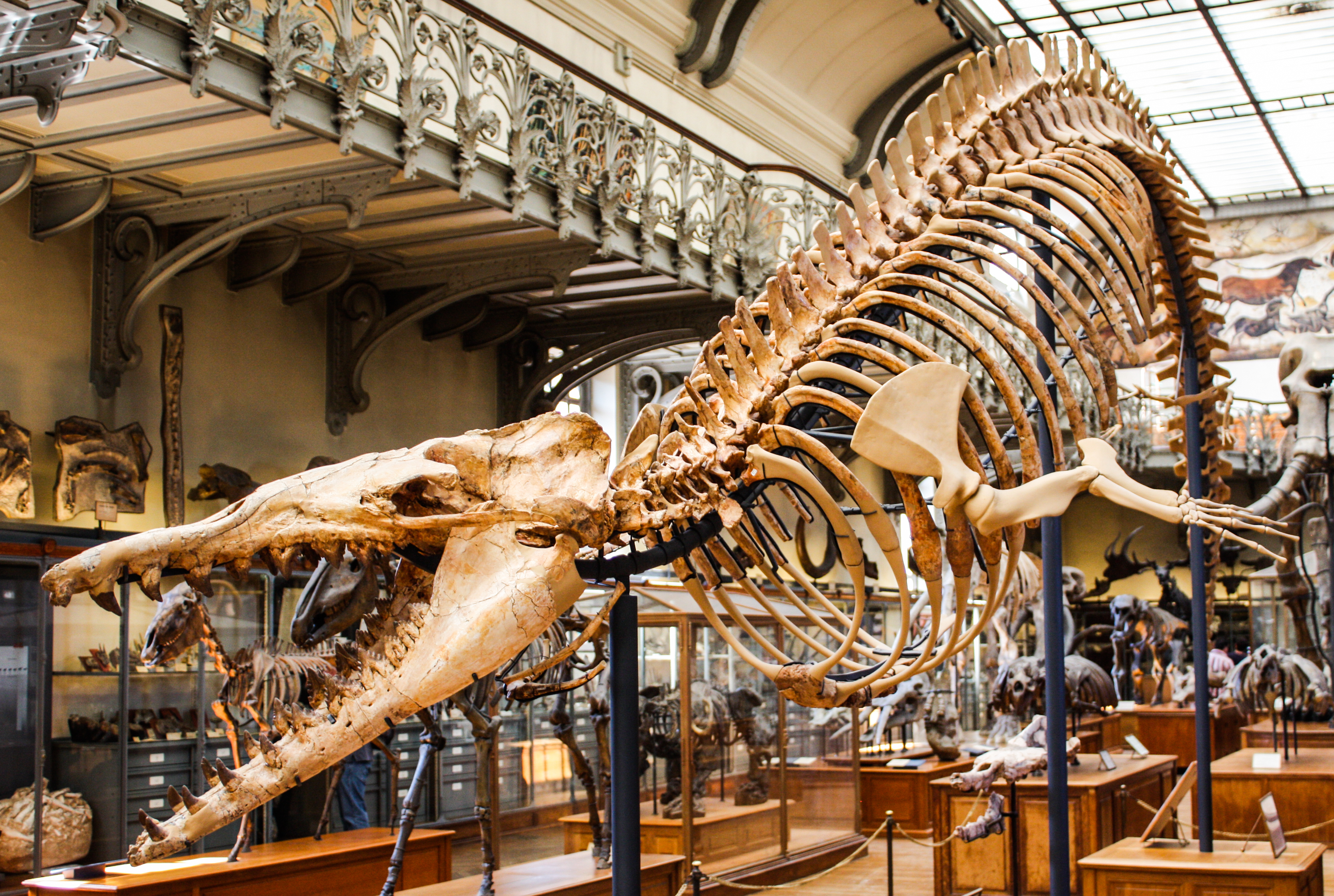
- Mounted fossilized skeleton of the Eocene whale Cynthiacetus
  †Cynthiacetus – type locality for genus
  - †Cynthiacetus maxwelli – type locality for species
- Cypraea
- Cypraedia
  - †Cypraedia fenestralis
- †Cypraeorbis
  - †Cypraeorbis nuculoides
  - †Cypraeorbis sphaeroides
  - †Cypraeorbis ventripotens

== D ==
- Daphnella
  - †Daphnella imperita
  - †Daphnella quindecima
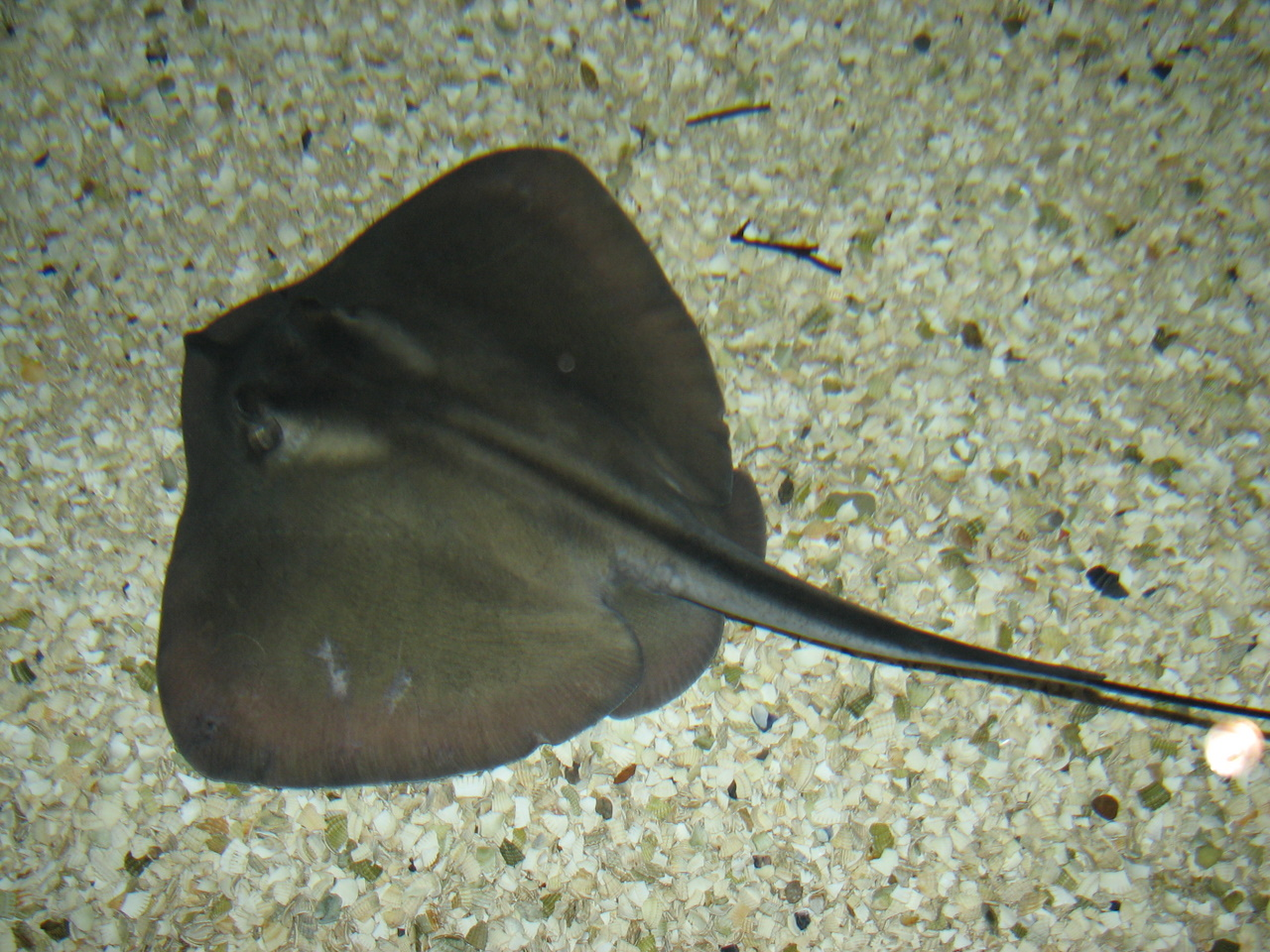
- A living Dasyatis stingray
  Dasyatis
  - †Dasyatis tricuspidatus
- †Dasyostoma
  - †Dasyostoma rugostoma
- Dendrophyllia
  - †Dendrophyllia lisbonensis
- Dentalium
  - †Dentalium bitubatum - broadly construed
  - †Dentalium incississimum
  - †Dentalium jacksonense
  - †Dentalium mediaviense
  - †Dentalium microstria
  - †Dentalium mississippiense
  - †Dentalium opaculum
  - †Dentalium polygonuum
  - †Dentalium strenuum
  - †Dentalium varicostata – type locality for species
  - †Dentalium zephyrinum
- Dermomurex
  - †Dermomurex cookei
- †Diacocherus
  - †Diacocherus dockeryi – type locality for species
- †Diacodexis
- Diaperoecia
  - †Diaperoecia clava – type locality for species
  - †Diaperoecia jacksoniensis
- Dimya
  - †Dimya rufaripa
- Dinocardium
  - †Dinocardium vicksburgensis
- Diodon
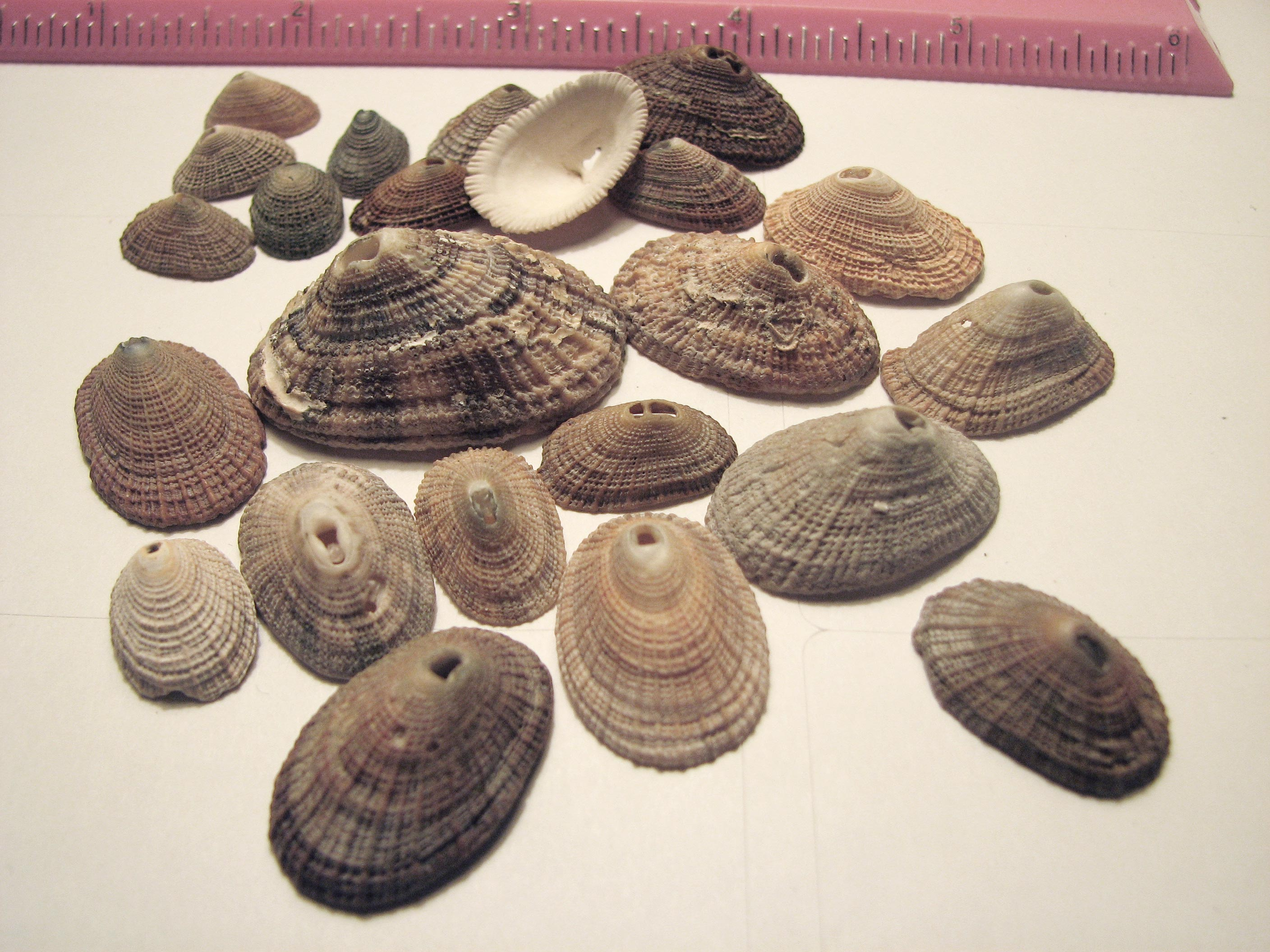
- Shells of Diodora keyhole limpets
  Diodora
  - †Diodora infrequens
  - †Diodora mississippiensis
  - †Diodora tenebrosa
- Diplodonta
  - †Diplodonta anterproductus
  - †Diplodonta bulla
  - †Diplodonta compacta – type locality for species
  - †Diplodonta deflatus
  - †Diplodonta eburnea
  - †Diplodonta elatia – type locality for species
  - †Diplodonta hopkinsensis
  - †Diplodonta turgida
  - †Diplodonta ungulina
- †Diplopholeos
  - †Diplopholeos lineatum
- Discopsis
  - †Discopsis pilsbryi – type locality for species
- †Discotrochus
  - †Discotrochus obrignianus
  - †Discotrochus orbignianus
- Distorsio
  - †Distorsio crassidens
- Divalinga
  - †Divalinga subrigaultiana
- †Dolicholatirus
  - †Dolicholatirus cervicrassus
  - †Dolicholatirus exilis
  - †Dolicholatirus leaensis
  - †Dolicholatirus perexilis
- Donax
  - †Donax funerata
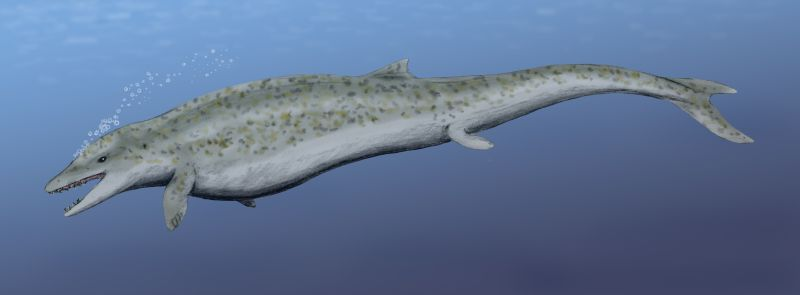
- Life restoration of the Eocene whaleDorudon
  †Dorudon

== E ==
- †Eburneopecten
  - †Eburneopecten corneoides
  - †Eburneopecten frontalis
  - †Eburneopecten scintillatus
  - †Eburneopecten subminutus
- Echinolampas
  - †Echinolampas aldrichi
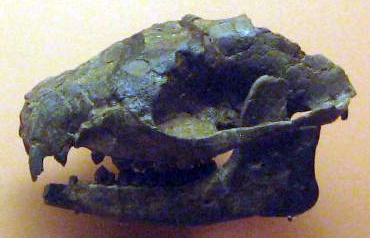
- Fossilized skull of the Paleocene-Eocene mammal Ectocion
  †Ectocion
  - †Ectocion nanabeensis – type locality for species
- †Egertonia
  - †Egertonia isodonta
- †Ekokenia
  - †Ekokenia eporrecta
- Ellisina
  - †Ellisina profunda
- Elphidium
  - †Elphidium gavestonense
  - †Elphidium latsipatium
- Emydoidea
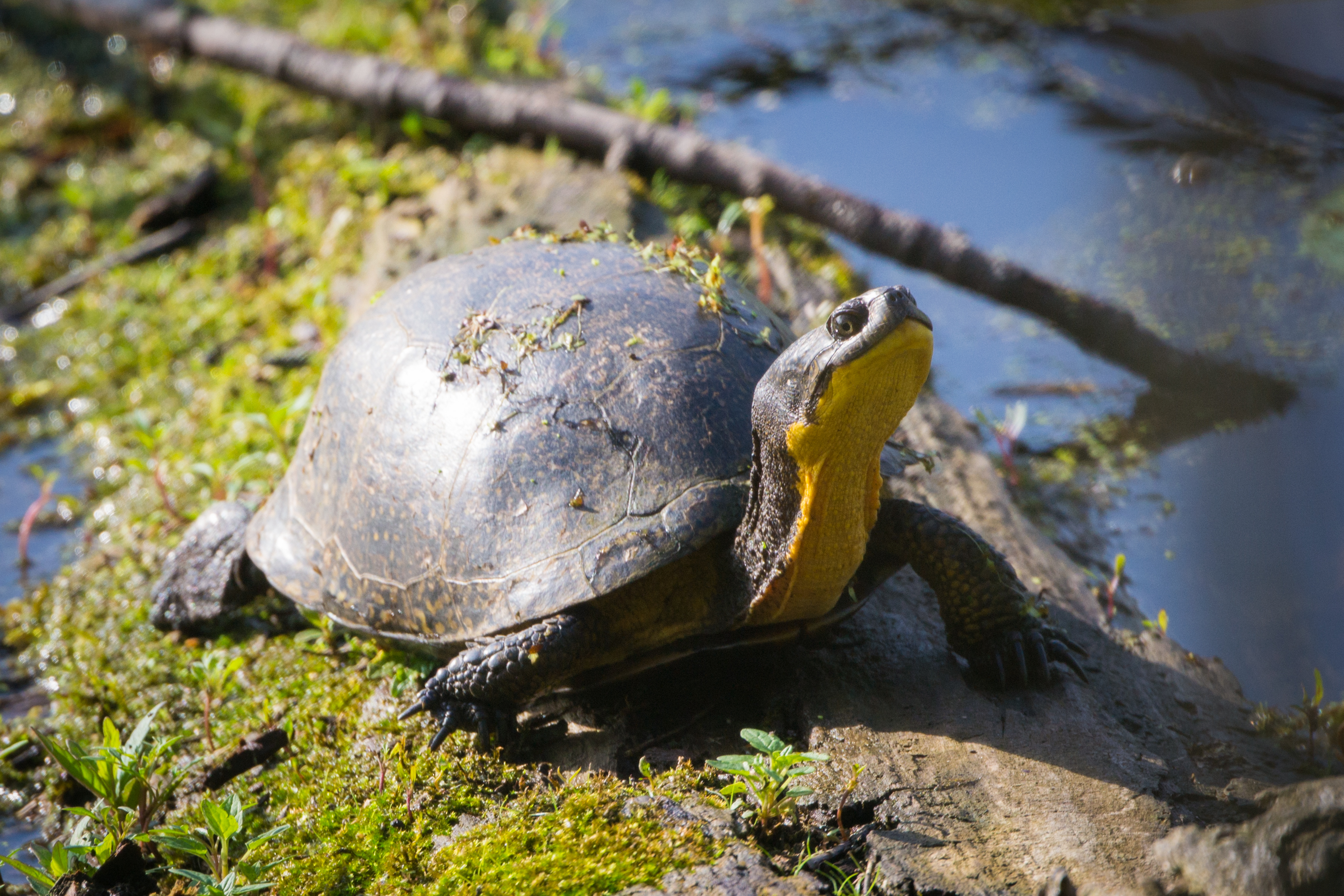
  - A living Emys blandingii, or Blanding's turtle
    †Emydoidea blandingii
- Enaeta
  - †Enaeta isabellae
- Endopachys
  - †Endopachys londsdalei
  - †Endopachys lonsdalei
  - †Endopachys maclurii
  - †Endopachys minutum – type locality for species
- Enoplostomella
  - †Enoplostomella magniporosa – type locality for species
  - †Enoplostomella synthetica
- †Eocithara
  - †Eocithara jacksonensis
- †Eoclathurella
  - †Eoclathurella obesula
- †Eodrilla
  - †Eodrilla longsdalii
  - †Eodrilla texana
- †Eodrillia – tentative report
- †Eogale – type locality for genus
  - †Eogale parydros – type locality for species
- †Eophysema
  - †Eophysema ozarkana
- †Eopleurotoma
  - †Eopleurotoma adolescens
  - †Eopleurotoma cainei
  - †Eopleurotoma carya
  - †Eopleurotoma cochlea
  - †Eopleurotoma gemmavia
  - †Eopleurotoma julia
  - †Eopleurotoma lisboncola
  - †Eopleurotoma nodocarinata
  - †Eopleurotoma nupera
  - †Eopleurotoma sayi
- †Eosurcula
  - †Eosurcula moorei
  - †Eosurcula pulcherrima
  - †Eosurcula tuomeyi
- †Eotorpedo
  - †Eotorpedo jaeckeli
  - †Eotorpedo jaekeli
- Epilucina
- Epistominella
  - †Epistominella pontoni
  - †Epistominella vitrea
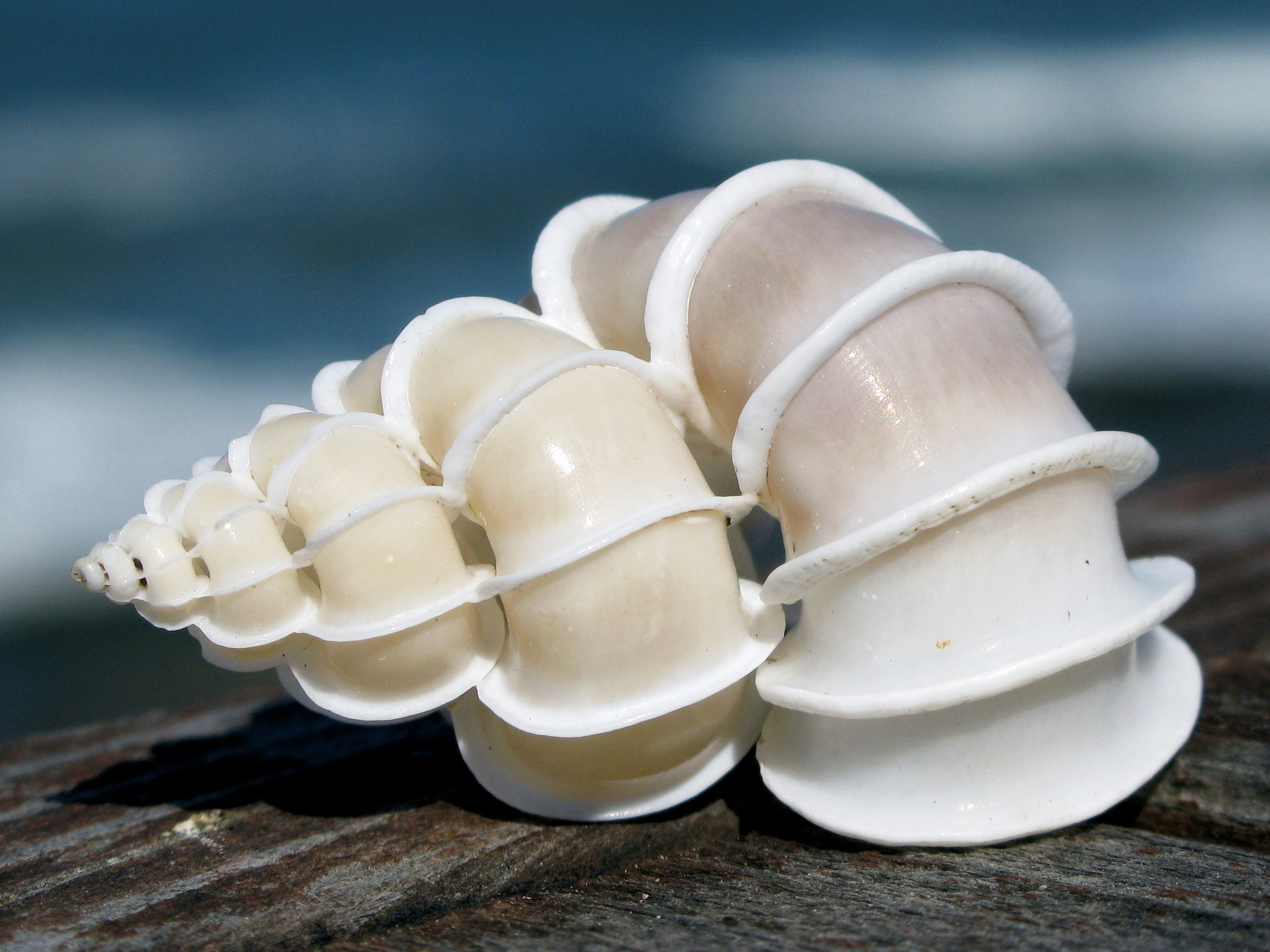
- Shell of an Epitonium wentletrap sea snail
  Epitonium
  - †Epitonium unilineata
- Equus
  - †Equus complicatus
- †Erkosonea
  - †Erkosonea semota
- †Eromotherium
- Ervilia
  - †Ervilia exteroaevis – type locality for species
  - †Ervilia exterolaevis – type locality for species
  - †Ervilia lamelloexteria – type locality for species
- Erycina
  - †Erycina zitteli
- Escharella
  - †Escharella granulosa
- †Etyus
  - †Etyus buccata
  - †Etyus strangulata
- †Eucheilodon
  - †Eucheilodon americana
  - †Eucheilodon crenocarinata
- †Eucymba
  - †Eucymba ocalana
- †Eucypraedia
  - †Eucypraedia pittsi – type locality for species
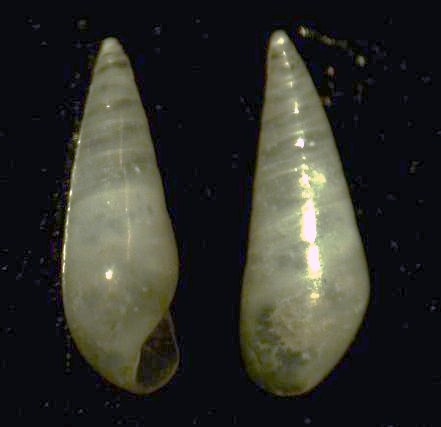
- Shells in differing orientations of the parasitic sea snail Eulima
  Eulima
  - †Eulima extremis
  - †Eulima jacksonensis
- Eulimella
  - †Eulimella clearyensis – type locality for species
- Eumetula
  - †Eumetula vicksburgella
- Eunaticina
  - †Eunaticina erectiodes
- †Eunicella
- Eurytellina
  - †Eurytellina linifera
  - †Eurytellina mooreana
  - †Eurytellina papyria
  - †Eurytellina spillmani
  - †Eurytellina vaughani
- †Euscalpellum
  - †Euscalpellum eocenense
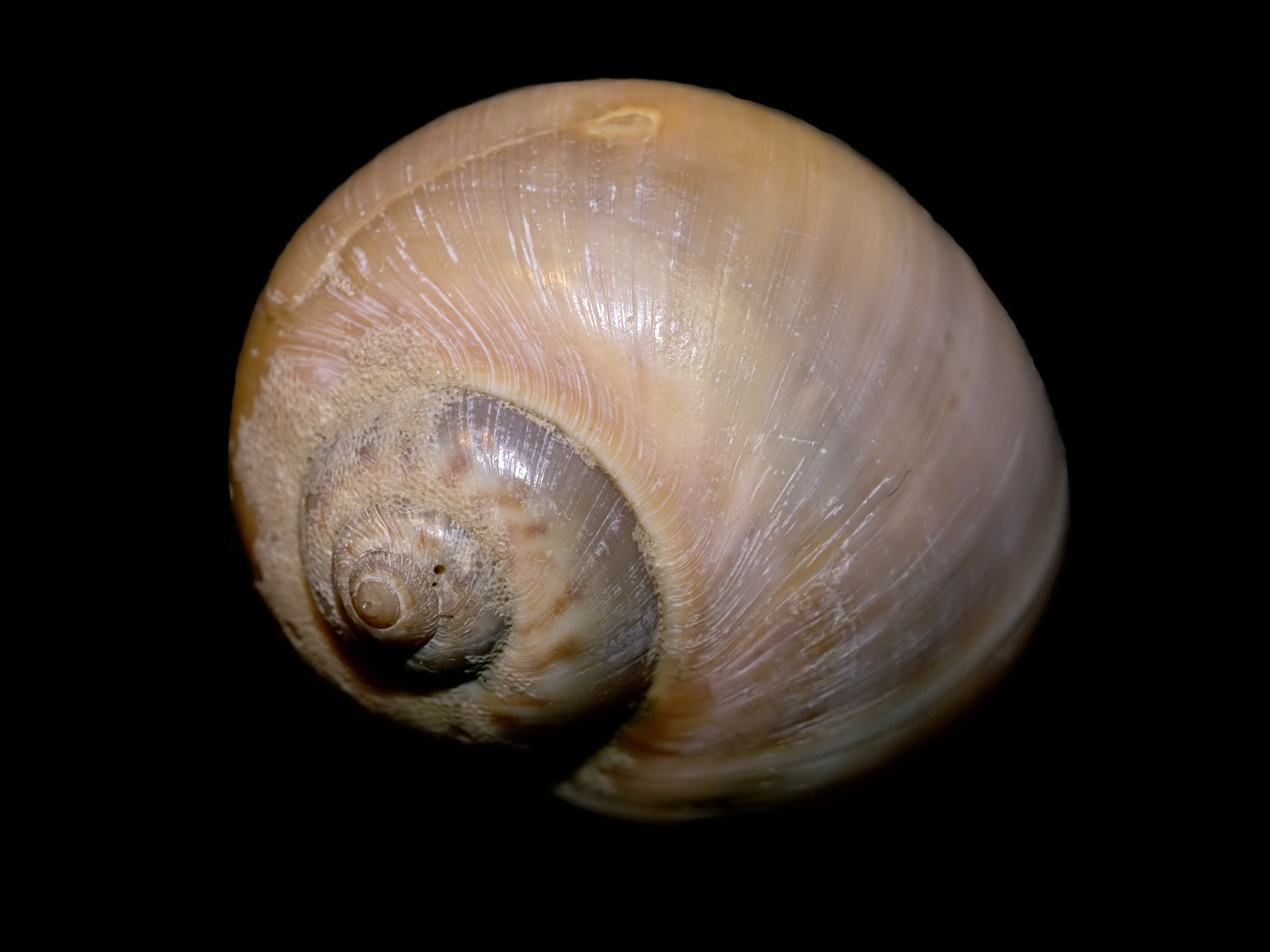
- Shell of a Euspira moon sea snail
  Euspira
  - †Euspira aldrichi
  - †Euspira jacksonensis
  - †Euspira marylandica
  - †Euspira newtonensis
  - †Euspira sabina
  - †Euspira vicksburgensis
- †Exilia
  - †Exilia pergracilis
- †Exochoecia
  - †Exochoecia rugosa

== F ==
- Falsifusus
  - †Falsifusus bastropensis
  - †Falsifusus ludlovicianus
  - †Falsifusus perobliquus
- †Fedora
  - †Fedora pusilla – type locality for species
- Felaniella
  - †Felaniella palmerae
- †Ficopsis
  - †Ficopsis penita
  - †Ficopsis texana
- Ficus
  - †Ficus filia
  - †Ficus merita
  - †Ficus mississippiensis
- Filisparsa
  - †Filisparsa fallax
- Flabellum
  - †Flabellum cuneiforme
  - †Flabellum rhomboideum – type locality for species
  - †Flabellum wailesii
- †Fleurofusia – tentative report
- Floridina
  - †Floridina antiqua
  - †Floridina bifoliata
  - †Floridina granulosa
- †Franimys
  - †Franimys actites – type locality for species
- Fulgurofusus
  - †Fulgurofusus quercollis
- Fusimitra
  - †Fusimitra conquisita
  - †Fusimitra millingtoni
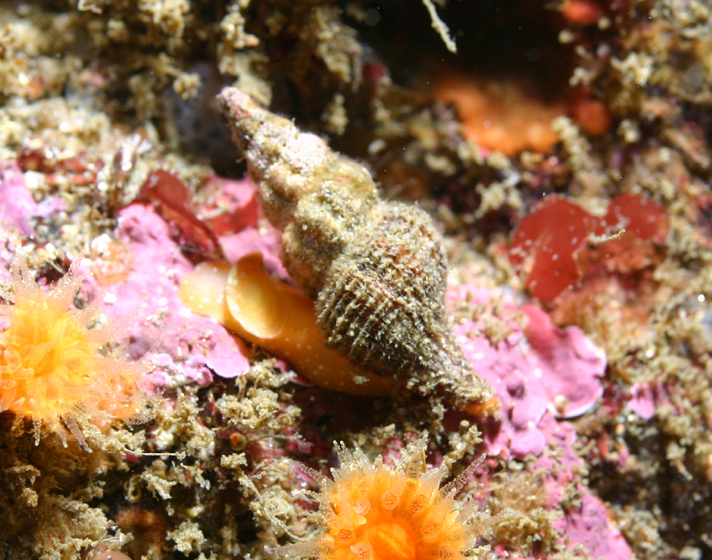
- A living Fusinus sea snail
  Fusinus
  - †Fusinus insectoides
- †Fusoficula
  - †Fusoficula angelinensis
- †Fustaria
  - †Fustaria menthifonta – type locality for species
- Fustiaria
  - †Fustiaria danai
  - †Fustiaria menthafonta – type locality for species
  - †Fustiaria subcompressa
- †Fustilaria

== G ==
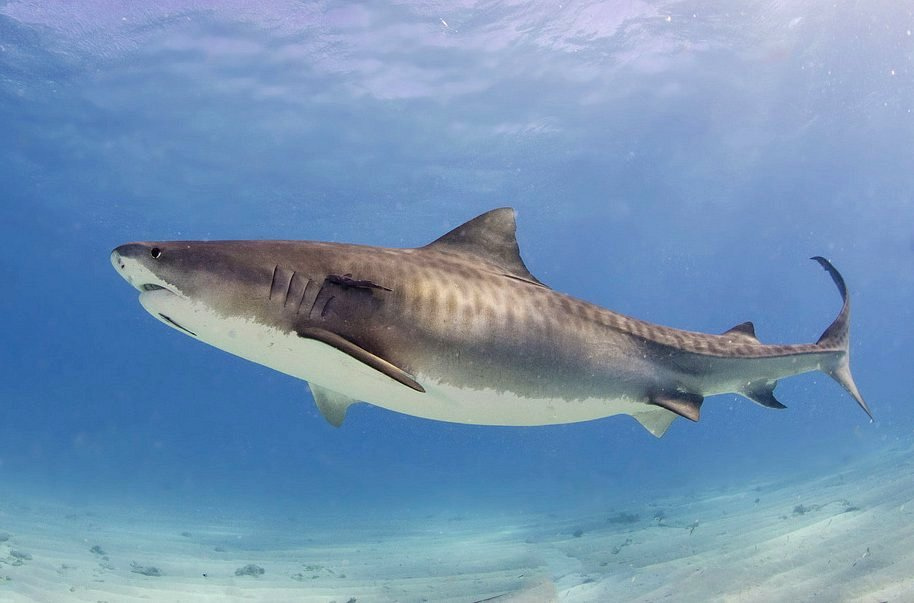
- A living Galeocerdo requiem shark
  Galeocerdo
  - †Galeocerdo clarkensis
- Galeodea
  - †Galeodea brevidentata
  - †Galeodea millsapsi
  - †Galeodea petersoni
  - †Galeodea planotecta
  - †Galeodea shubutensis
  - †Galeodea tricarinata
- Galeorhinus
  - †Galeorhinus affini
  - †Galeorhinus affinis
  - †Galeorhinus huberensis
  - †Galeorhinus minor
  - †Galeorhinus ypresiensis
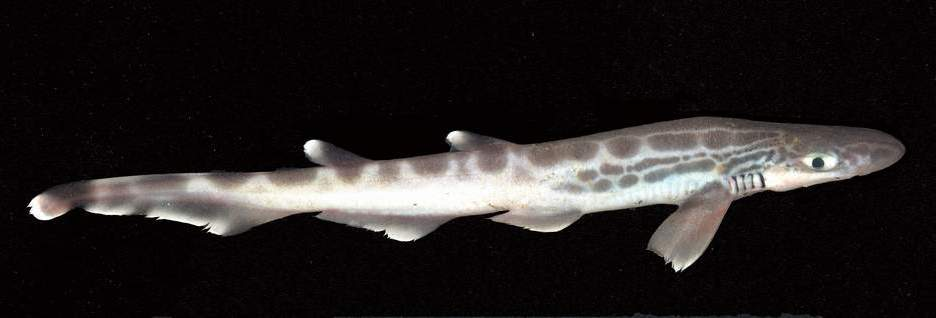
- Galeus
  Galeus
- Gari
  - †Gari jacksonensis
  - †Gari ozarkana
  - †Gari papyria
- Gastrochaena
  - †Gastrochaena mississippiensis
- Gegania
  - †Gegania antiquata
- Gemmula
  - †Gemmula amica
  - †Gemmula rotaedens
- Genota
  - †Genota aldrichi
  - †Genota axeli
  - †Genota heilprini
- Geochelone
  - †Geochelone crassicutata
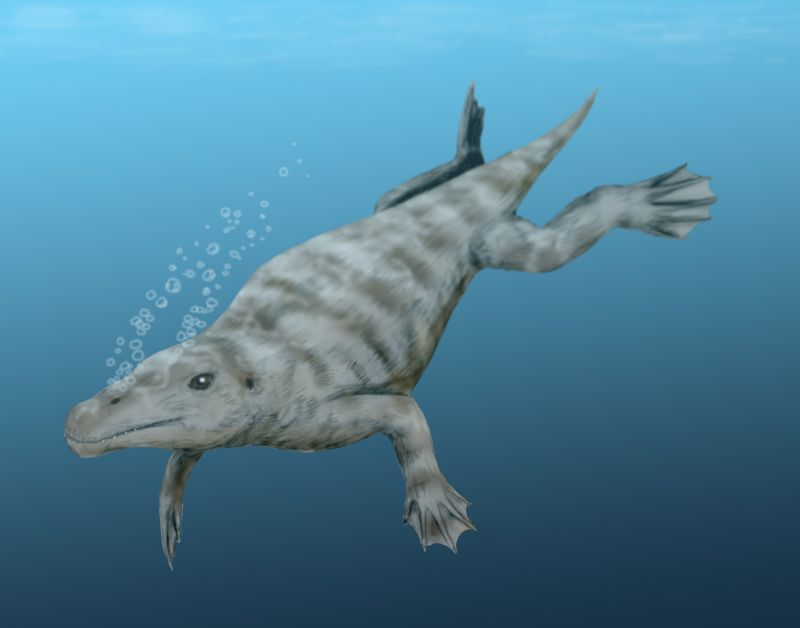
- Life restoration of the Eocene whale Georgiacetus
  †Georgiacetus
  - †Georgiacetus vogtlensis
- Gephyrotes
  - †Gephyrotes spectabilis – type locality for species
- †Gigantostrea
  - †Gigantostrea trigonalis
- Ginglymostoma
  - †Ginglymostoma subafricanum
- Globigerina
  - †Globigerina praebuloides
  - †Globigerina riveroae
- Globivenus
  - †Globivenus ucuttana
- †Globoquadrina
  - †Globoquadrina dehiscens
- Globorotalia
  - †Globorotalia peripheroacuta
  - †Globorotalia peripheroronda
  - †Globorotalia pseudomiocenica
- Globularia
  - †Globularia morgani
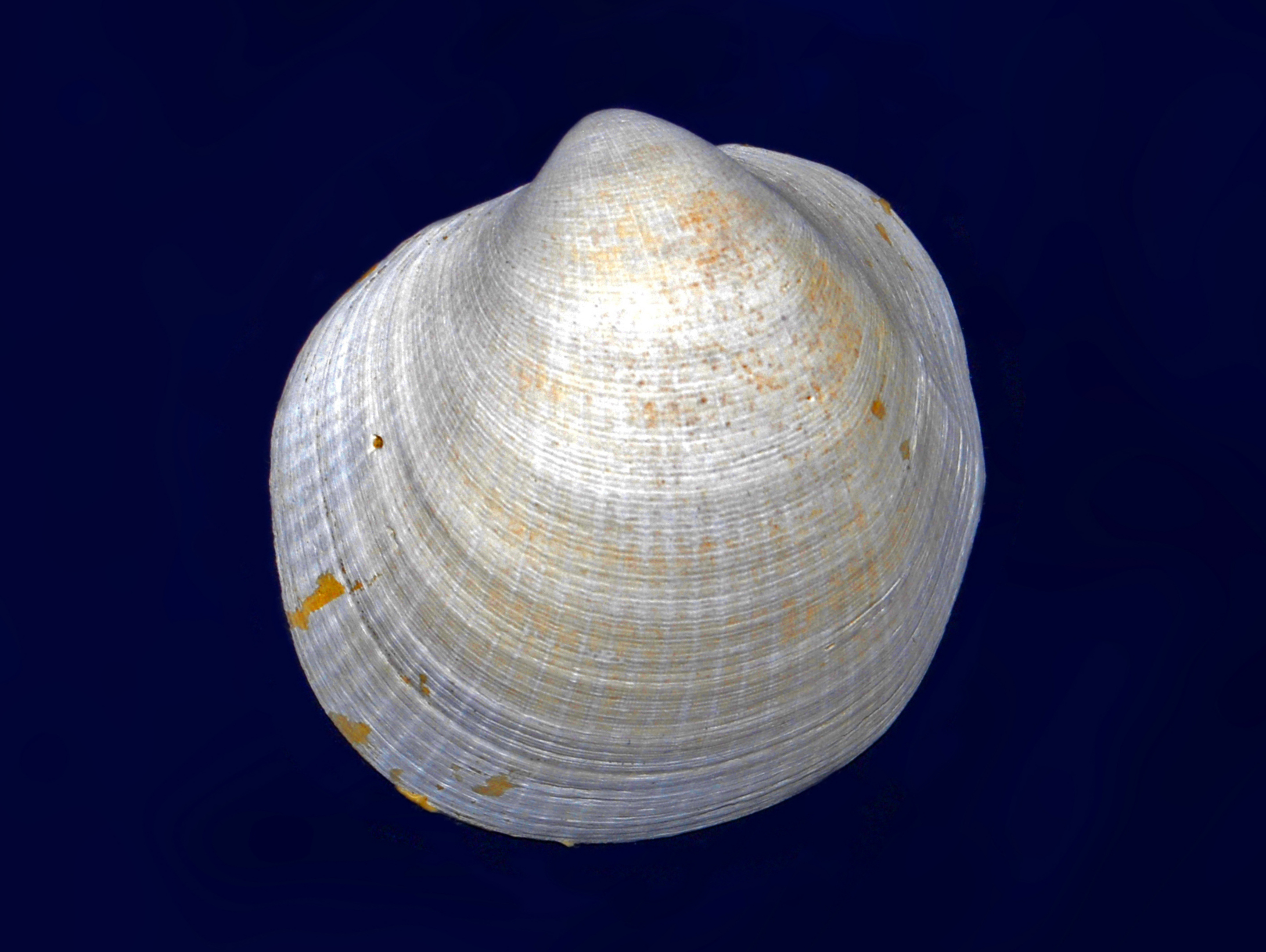
- Fossilized shell of a Glycymeris, or bittersweet clam
  Glycymeris
  - †Glycymeris arctata
  - †Glycymeris filosa
  - †Glycymeris idonea
  - †Glycymeris intercostata
  - †Glycymeris lisbonensis
  - †Glycymeris mississippiensis
  - †Glycymeris suwannensis
  - †Glycymeris wautubbeana
- Glyptemys
  - †Glyptemys insculpta
- Glyptoactis
  - †Glyptoactis alticostata
  - †Glyptoactis complexicosta
  - †Glyptoactis trapaquara
- †Glyptotoma
  - †Glyptotoma conradiana
  - †Glyptotoma crassiplicata
- Gonimyrtea
  - †Gonimyrtea curta
- †Gracilocyon
  - †Gracilocyon igniculus – type locality for species
- Graptemys
- †Gryphaeostrea
  - †Gryphaeostrea plicatella

== H ==
- Haliris
  - †Haliris mississippiensis
  - †Haliris quadrangularis
- Hanzawaia
  - †Hanzawaia strattoni
- †Haplomylus
  - †Haplomylus meridionalis – type locality for species
- Harpa
  - †Harpa vicksburgiana – type locality for species
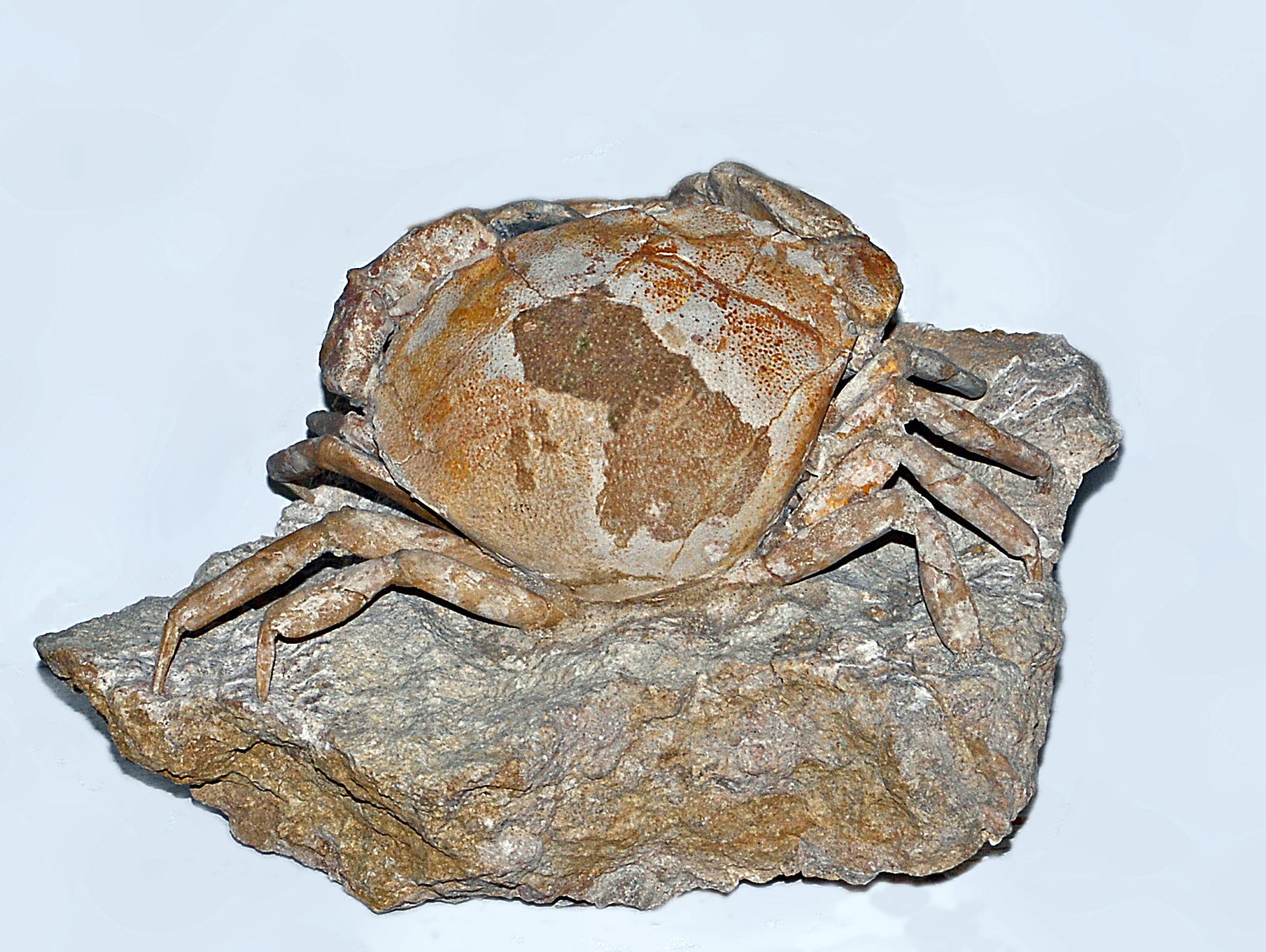
- Fossil of the Cretaceous-Miocene crab Harpactocarcinus
  †Harpactocarcinus
- Hastula
  - †Hastula houstonia
- Haustator
  - †Haustator carinata
  - †Haustator perdita
  - †Haustator rina
  - †Haustator rivurbana
- †Heliconoides
  - †Heliconoides inflata – or unidentified comparable form
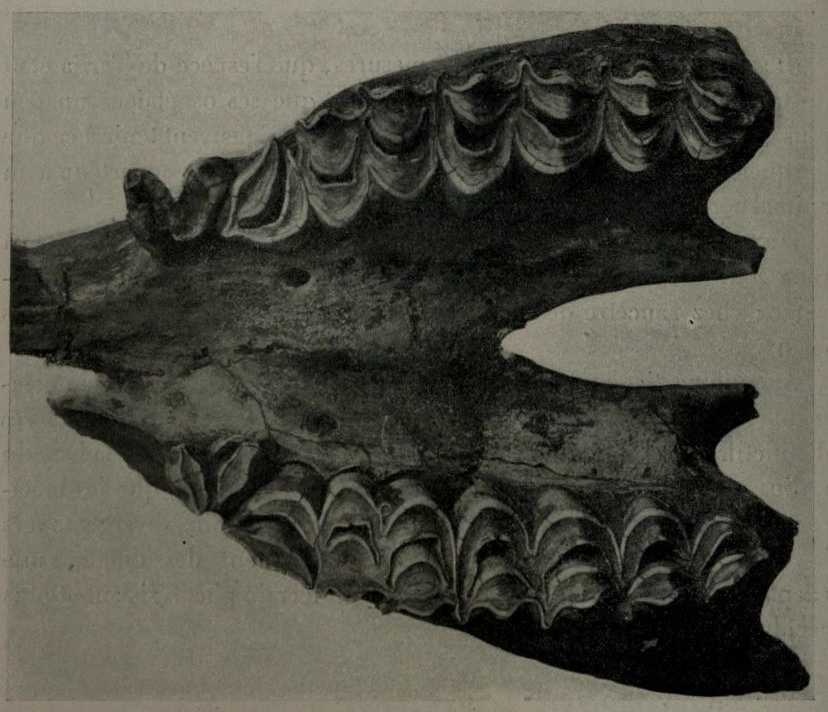
- Fossilized lower jaw of the Miocene-Pleistocene llama relative Hemiauchenia
  †Hemiauchenia
  - †Hemiauchenia macrocephala
- Hemipristis
  - †Hemipristis wyattdurhami
- †Hemisurcula
  - †Hemisurcula hicoicola
  - †Hemisurcula hicoricola
  - †Hemisurcula perexilis
- †Hesperiturris
  - †Hesperiturris nodocarinatus
- †Hesperotestudo
  - †Hesperotestudo crassiscutata
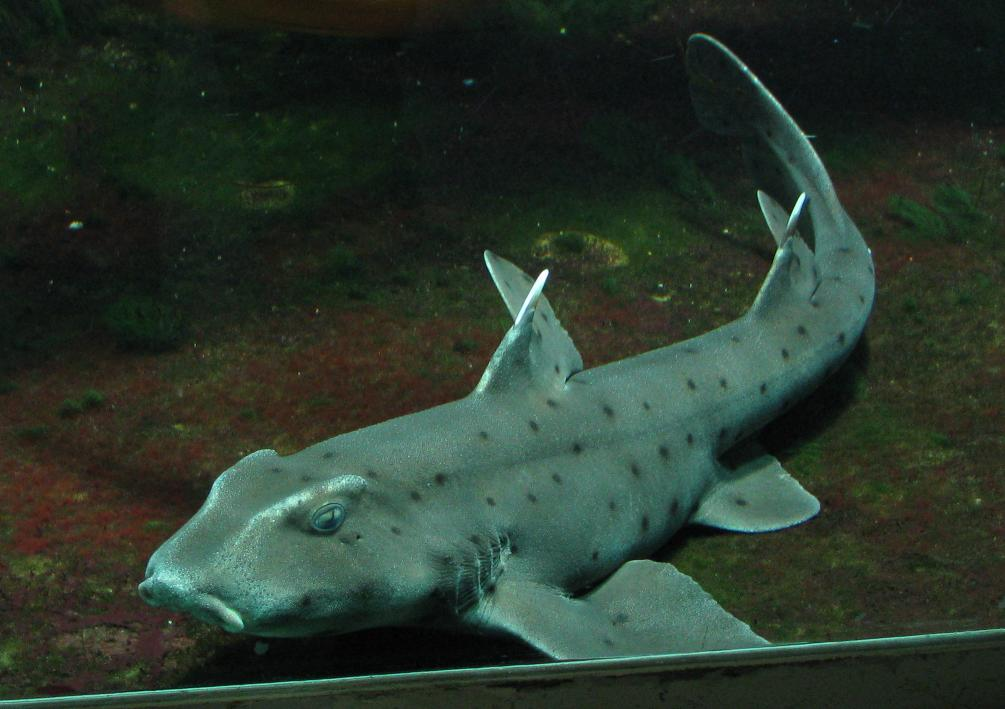
- A living Heterodontus, or bullhead shark
  Heterodontus
  - †Heterodontus sowasheense – type locality for species
- Heteropora
  - †Heteropora amaena
  - †Heteropora ovalis
- Hexaplex
  - †Hexaplex engonatus
  - †Hexaplex katherinae
  - †Hexaplex marksi
  - †Hexaplex silvatucus
  - †Hexaplex supernus
  - †Hexaplex vanuxemi
- †Hilgardia
  - †Hilgardia coelatoides
  - †Hilgardia multilineata
- Hincksina – tentative report
  - †Hincksina ocalensis
- Hippomenella
  - †Hippomenella crassicollis
  - †Hippomenella punctata
  - †Hippomenella radicata
  - †Hippomenella rotula – type locality for species
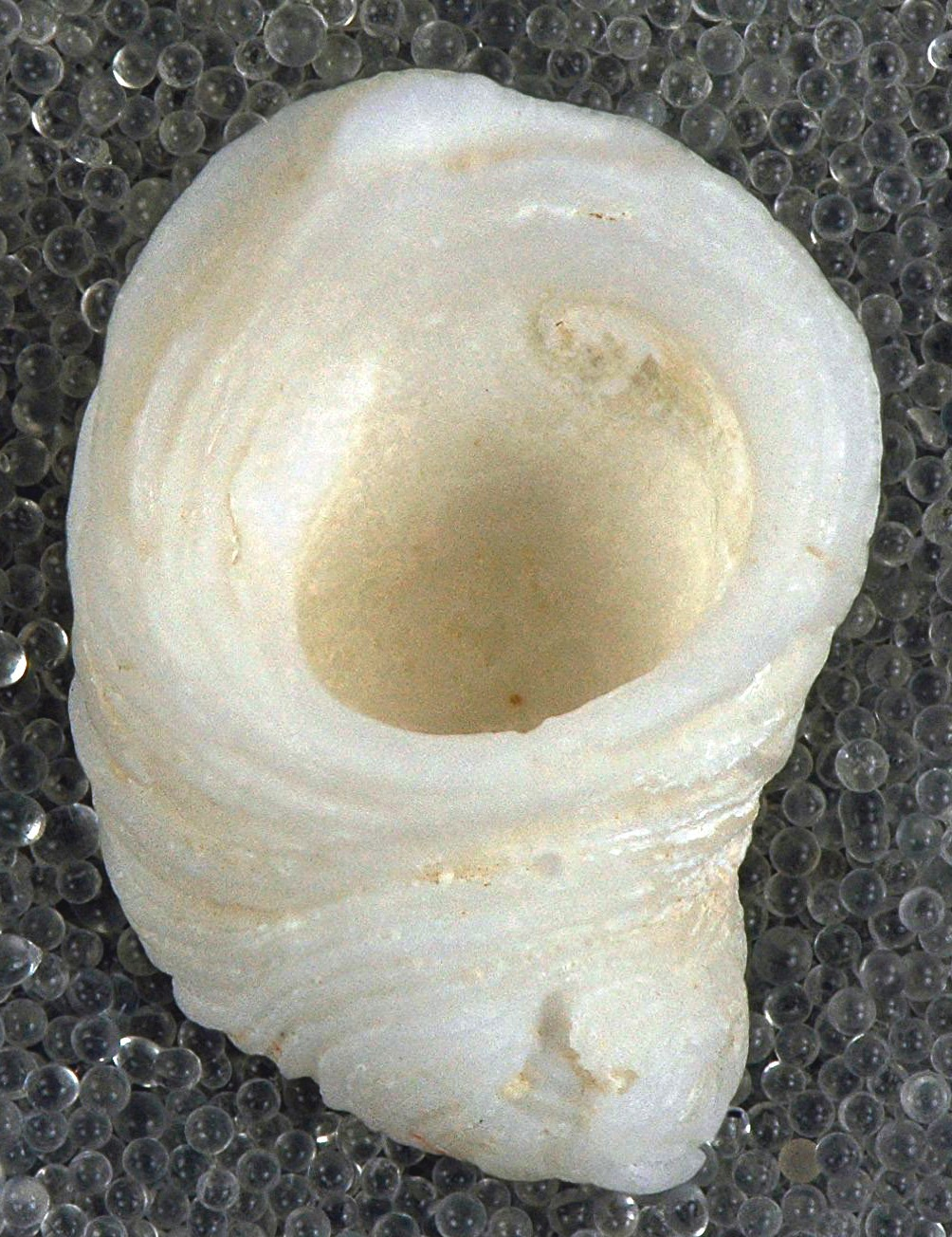
- Shell of a Hipponix, or hoof sea snail
  Hipponix
  - †Hipponix – type locality for species informal
  - †Hipponix n.sp informal
  - †Hipponix pygmaea
  - †Hipponix pygmaeus
- Hippoporina
  - †Hippoporina lucens
- †Hippozeugosella
  - †Hippozeugosella arcuata
  - †Hippozeugosella marginata
- Homo
- †Homomya
  - †Homomya hamatoides
- Hornera
  - †Hornera polyporoides
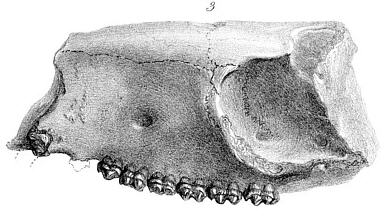
- Illustration of a fossilized partial cranium of the Eocene odd-toed ungulates Hyracotherium
  †Hyracotherium

== I ==
- Idmonea
  - †Idmonea magna
  - †Idmonea milneana
  - †Idmonea petri
  - †Idmonea triforata
- †Infracoronia
  - †Infracoronia ludoviciana
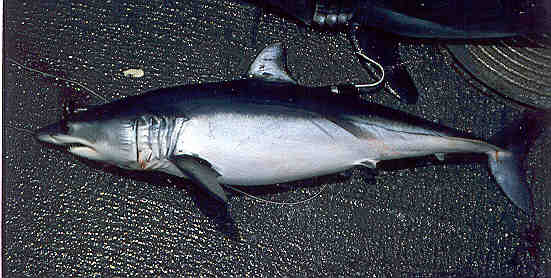
- A modern Isurus, or mako shark
  Isurus
  - †Isurus praecursor

== J ==
- †Jaekelotodus – tentative report
- †Jefitchia
  - †Jefitchia claybornensis
- Jouannetia
  - †Jouannetia triquetra

== K ==
- †Kapalmerella
  - †Kapalmerella alveata
  - †Kapalmerella arenicola
- Kellia
  - †Kellia interstriata
- Kelliella
  - †Kelliella boettgeri
  - †Kelliella rufaripa – type locality for species
- †Kleidionella
  - †Kleidionella grandis
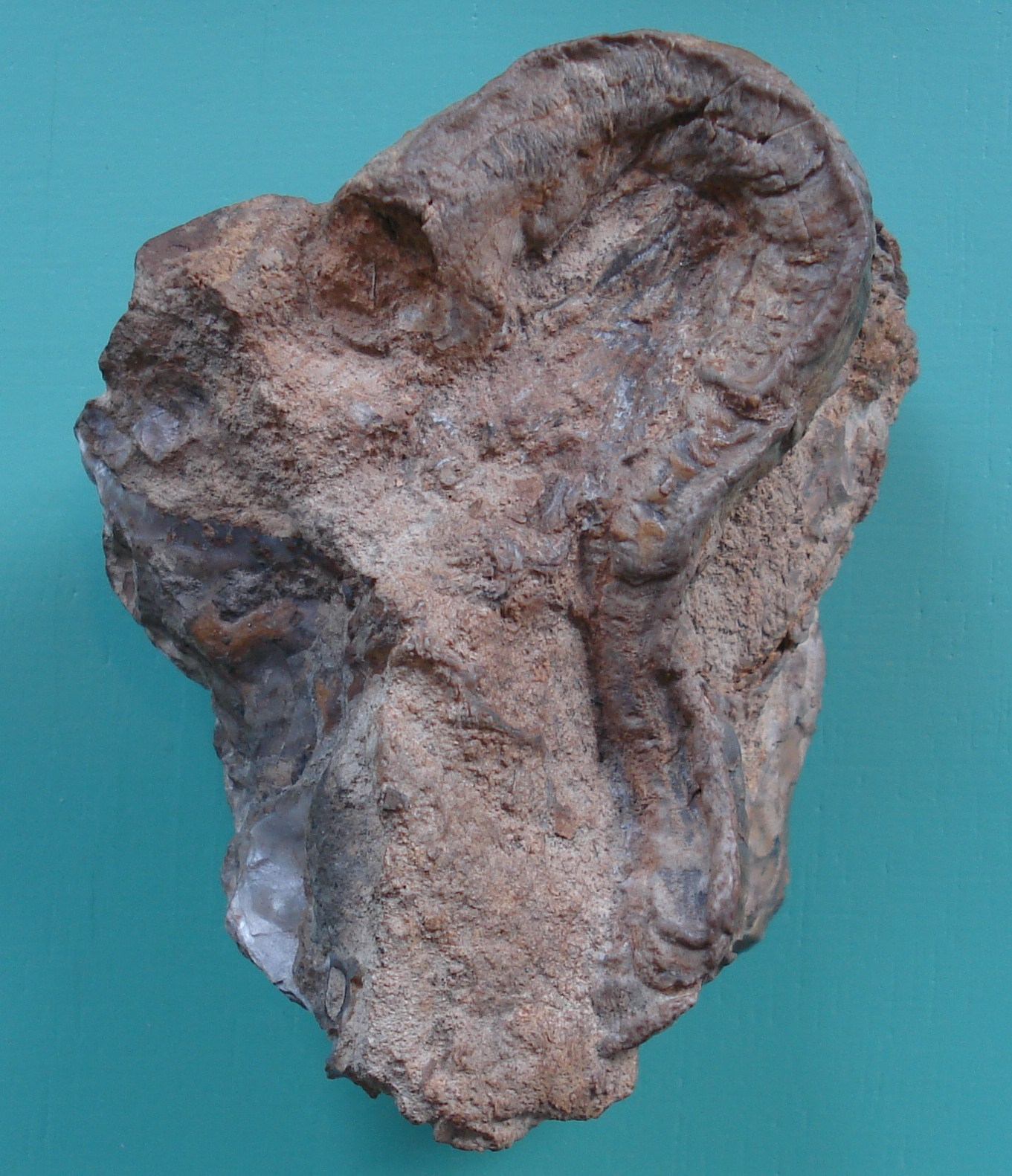
- Fossilized "worm" tube, possibly of the Oligocene-modern shipworm marine bivalve genus Kuphus
  Kuphus
  - †Kuphus incrassatus

== L ==
- Lacerna
  - †Lacerna jacksonensis
- †Lacinia
  - †Lacinia alveata
- Laevicardium
  - †Laevicardium gardnerae
  - †Laevicardium leptorimum – type locality for species
- Lamna
  - †Lamna lerichei
- †Lapparia
  - †Lapparia dumosa
  - †Lapparia exigua
  - †Lapparia mooreana
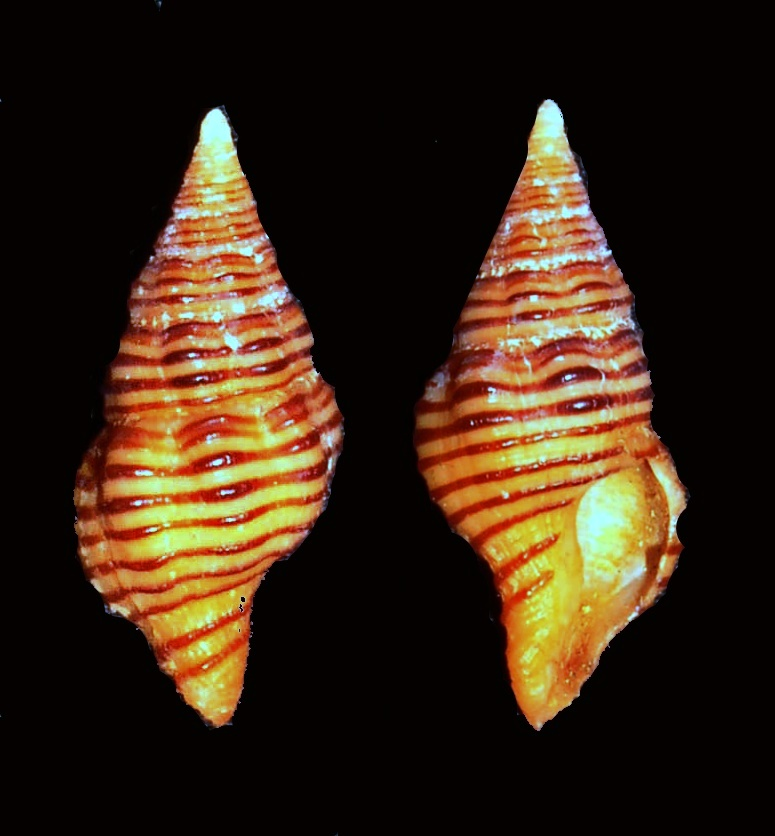
- Two views of a shell of a Latirus sea snail
  Latirus
  - †Latirus aldrichi – type locality for species
  - †Latirus humilior
  - †Latirus indistinctus
  - †Latirus mississippiensis
  - †Latirus moorei
  - †Latirus protractus
  - †Latirus suturalis
- Leiosella
  - †Leiosella orbicularia – type locality for species
- †Lepidocyclina
  - †Lepidocyclina supera
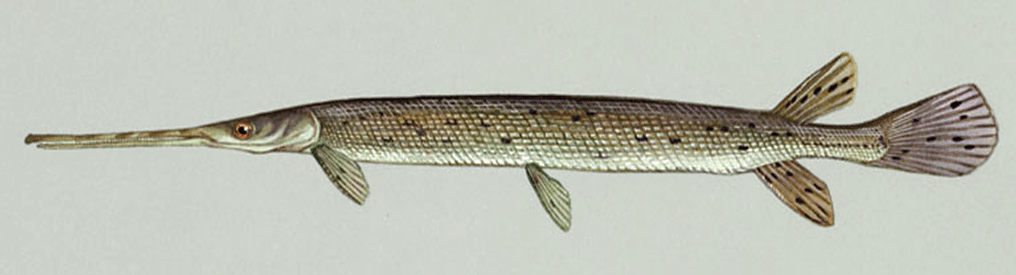
- Illustration of a living Lepisosteus, or gar
  Lepisosteus
  - †Lepisosteus suessionensis
- †Levifusus
  - †Levifusus branneri
  - †Levifusus hubbard
  - †Levifusus moodianus
  - †Levifusus mortonii
  - †Levifusus mortoniopsis
  - †Levifusus nodulatum
  - †Levifusus spiniger
- Lichenopora
  - †Lichenopora grignonensis
- Lima
  - †Lima bastropensis
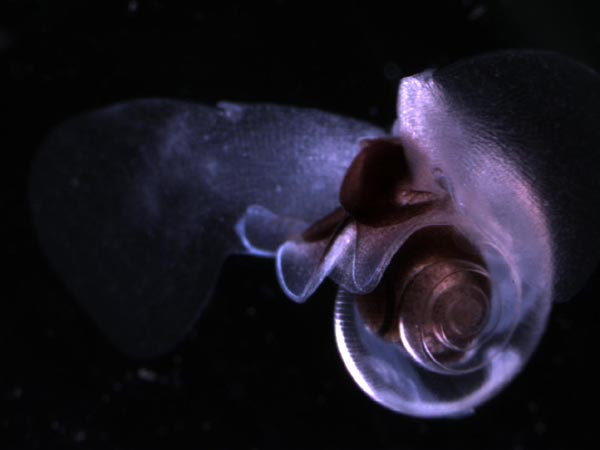
- A living Limacina sea butterfly
  Limacina
- Limaria
  - †Limaria staminea
- Limopsis
  - †Limopsis aviculoides
  - †Limopsis radiata
- Linga
  - †Linga pomilia
- †Lirodiscus
  - †Lirodiscus jacksonensis
  - †Lirodiscus pretriangulata
  - †Lirodiscus protractus
  - †Lirodiscus psychopterus
  - †Lirodiscus smithvillensis
- †Lirofusus
  - †Lirofusus thoracicus
- Lirophora
  - †Lirophora victoria
- †Lithophysema
  - †Lithophysema grande
- Litiopa
  - †Litiopa spirata
- †Litorhadia
  - †Litorhadia compsa
  - †Litorhadia mater
- Lopha
  - †Lopha vicksburgensis
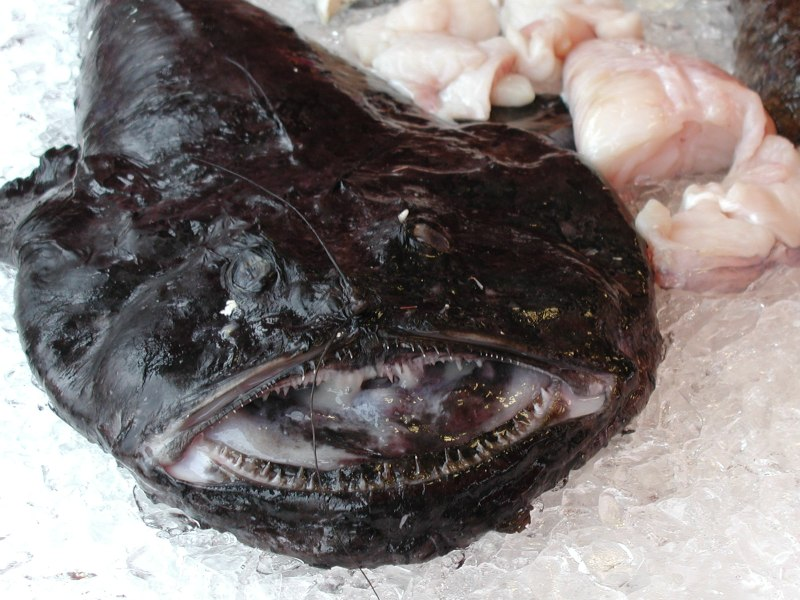
- Lophius
  Lophius
  - †Lophius sagittidens
- †Lophoranina
  - †Lophoranina georgiana
- Lucina
  - †Lucina fimbripallium – type locality for species
  - †Lucina ozarkana – tentative report
  - †Lucina papyracea
  - †Lucina pomilia
  - †Lucina subcurta
- Lucinisca
  - †Lucinisca varisculpta – type locality for species
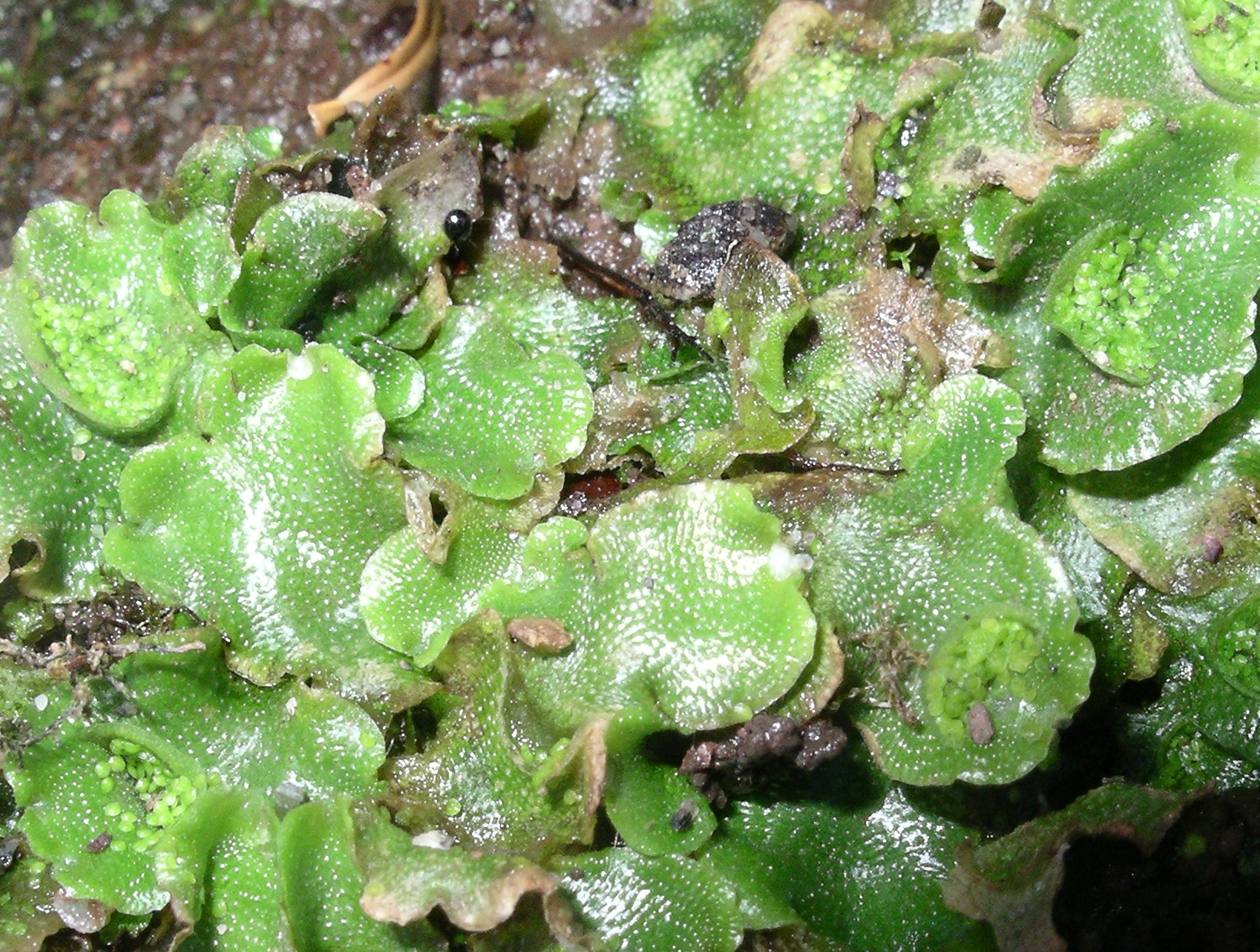
- Living Lunularia, or crescent-cup liverwort
  Lunularia
  - †Lunularia fenestrata
  - †Lunularia jacksonensis
  - †Lunularia ligulata – type locality for species
  - †Lunularia tintinabula
- Lunulites
  - †Lunulites bouei
  - †Lunulites fenestrata
  - †Lunulites jacksonensis
  - †Lunulites truncata
- Lyria
  - †Lyria mississippiensis
  - †Lyria nestor
- †Lyrischapa
  - †Lyrischapa harrisi – type locality for species
- †Lyropecten
  - †Lyropecten menthifontis
- †Lyrosurcula
  - †Lyrosurcula dalli
  - †Lyrosurcula shaleri

== M ==
- Macrocallista
  - †Macrocallista sylvaerupis
- Mactra
  - †Mactra inornata
- Madracis
  - †Madracis gregoriori
- †Mammut
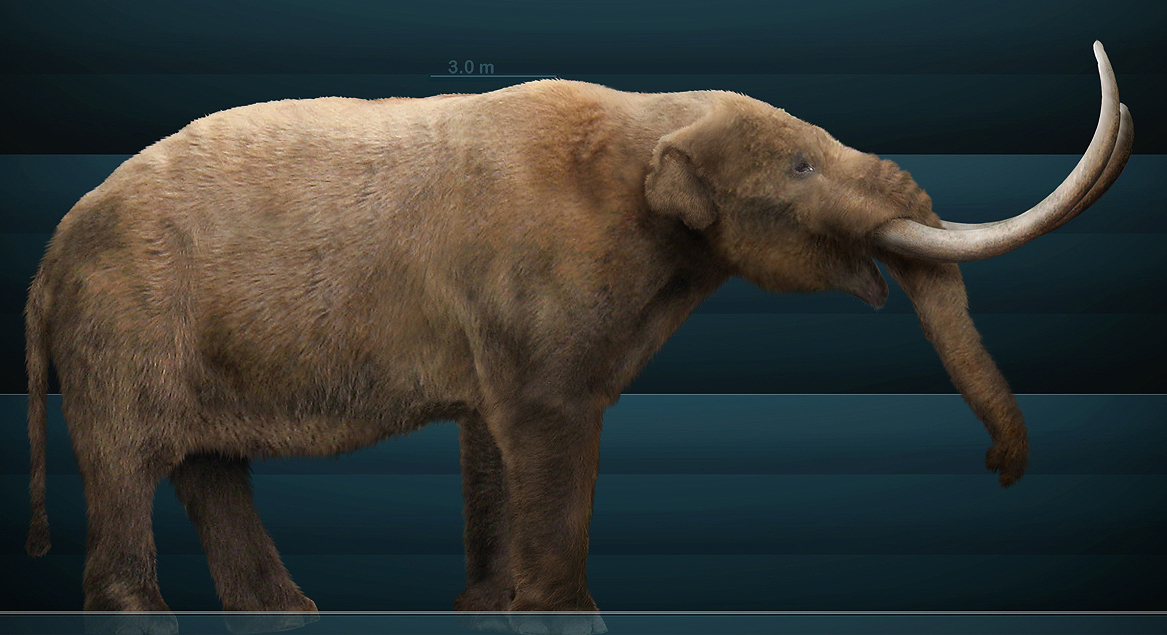
  - Restoration of a Mammut americanum, or American mastodon
    †Mammut americanum
- Maretia
  - †Maretia arguta – type locality for species
- Margaretta
  - †Margaretta vicksburgica
- Marginella
  - †Marginella constrichtoides
  - †Marginella constrictoides
  - †Marginella silabra
- †Mastigophora
  - †Mastigophora hyndmanni
- Mathilda
  - †Mathilda regularis
  - †Mathilda retisculpta
- †Mazzalina
  - †Mazzalina inaurata
- Mecynoecia
  - †Mecynoecia semota
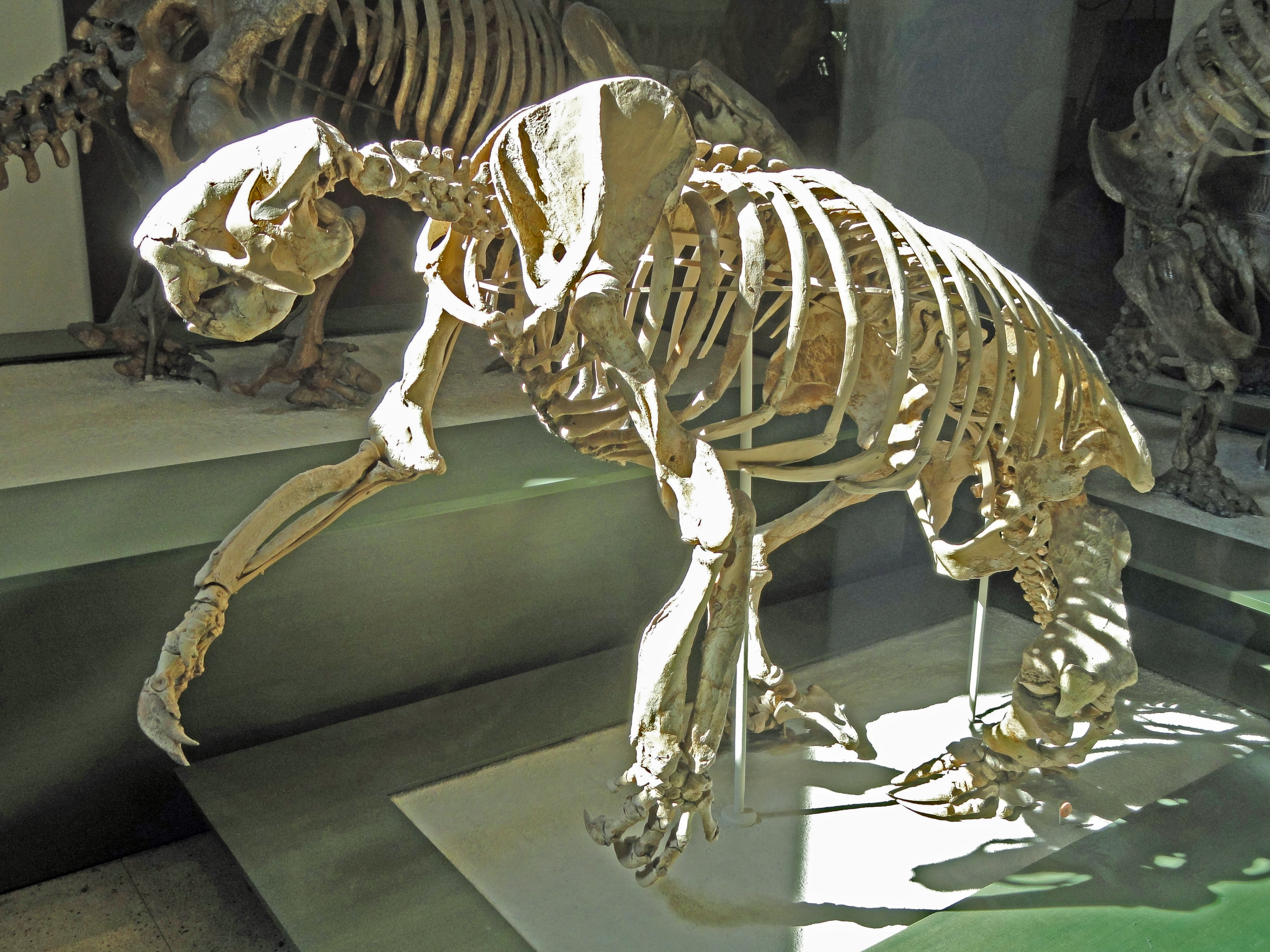
- Mounted fossilized skeleton of the Miocene-Pleistocene ground sloth Megalonyx
  †Megalonyx
  - †Megalonyx jeffersonii
- Melanella
  - †Melanella amnicreta
  - †Melanella jacksonensis
  - †Melanella postnotata
- Membraniporidra
  - †Membraniporidra oecioporosa
  - †Membraniporidra spissimuralis
- †Meniscopora
  - †Meniscopora elliptica
- †Meridiania – type locality for genus
  - †Meridiania convexa – type locality for species
- Mesalia
  - †Mesalia allentonensis
  - †Mesalia claibornensis
  - †Mesalia vetusta
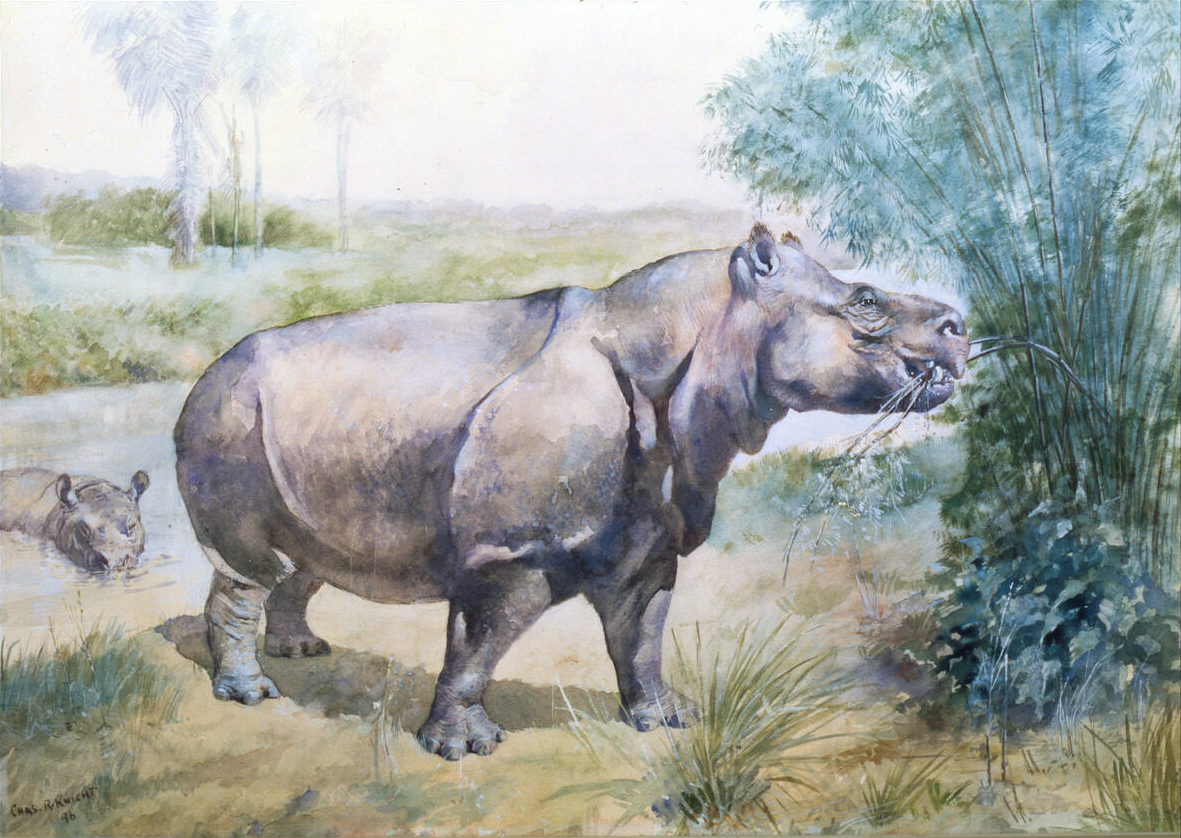
- Restoration of the Eocene-Miocene swamp rhinoceros Metamynodon. Charles R. Knight (1896).
  †Metamynodon
  - †Metamynodon planifrons
- †Metradolium
  - †Metradolium sulciferum – type locality for species
- Metrarabdotos
  - †Metrarabdotos grande – type locality for species
  - †Metrarabdotos moniliferum
- Metula
  - †Metula fastidiosa
  - †Metula fragilis
  - †Metula gentilicia
  - †Metula inflata – type locality for species
  - †Metula neptuneiformis – type locality for species
  - †Metula subgracilis
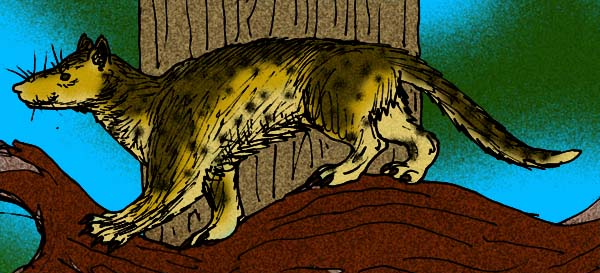
- Life restoration of the Paleocene-Eocene mammal Miacis
  †Miacis
- †Michela
  - †Michela trabeatoides
- †Micrdodrillia
  - †Micrdodrillia vicksburgella
- Microdrillia
  - †Microdrillia brevis
  - †Microdrillia cossmanni
  - †Microdrillia infans
  - †Microdrillia ouachitae
  - †Microdrillia robustula
  - †Microdrillia vicksburgella
- †Microscyliorhinus – type locality for genus
  - †Microscyliorhinus leggetti – type locality for species
- †Microsurcula
  - †Microsurcula intacta
  - †Microsurcula mentha – type locality for species
  - †Microsurcula nucleola
- Miltha
  - †Miltha gaufia
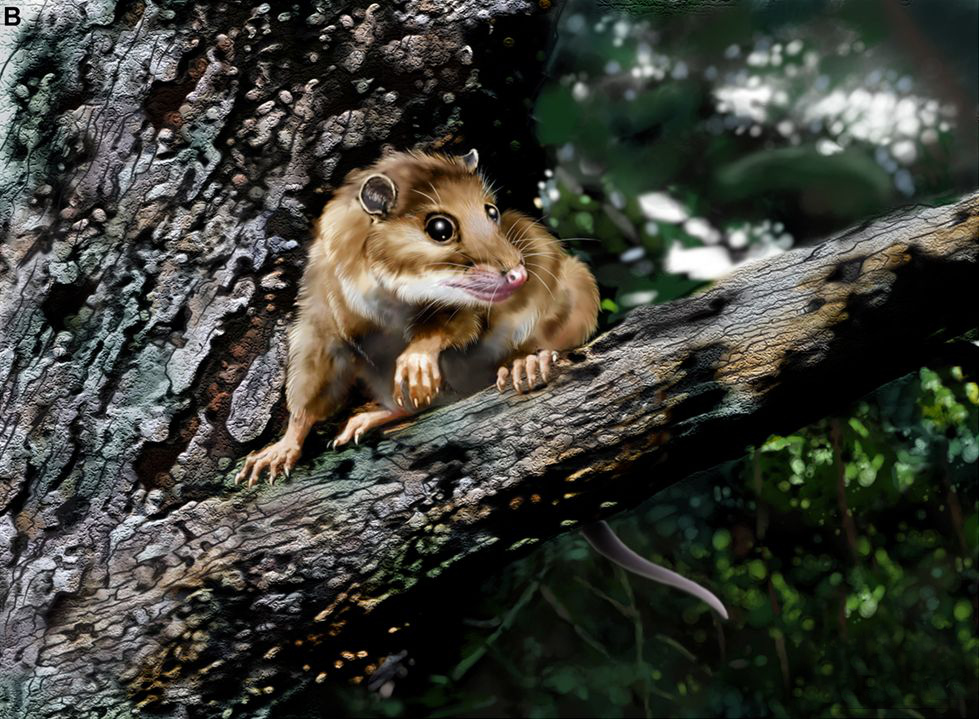
- Restoration of the Eocene opossum relative Mimoperadectes
  †Mimoperadectes
  - †Mimoperadectes sowasheensis
- Mitra
  - †Mitra conquista
  - †Mitra mississippiensis
- Mitrella
  - †Mitrella bastropensis
  - †Mitrella bucciniformis
  - †Mitrella fuscicava
  - †Mitrella oryzoides – or unidentified related form
  - †Mitrella parva
- Mnestia
  - †Mnestia meyeri
- Modiolus – tentative report
- Morum
  - †Morum harpula
- Mulinia
  - †Mulinia lateralis
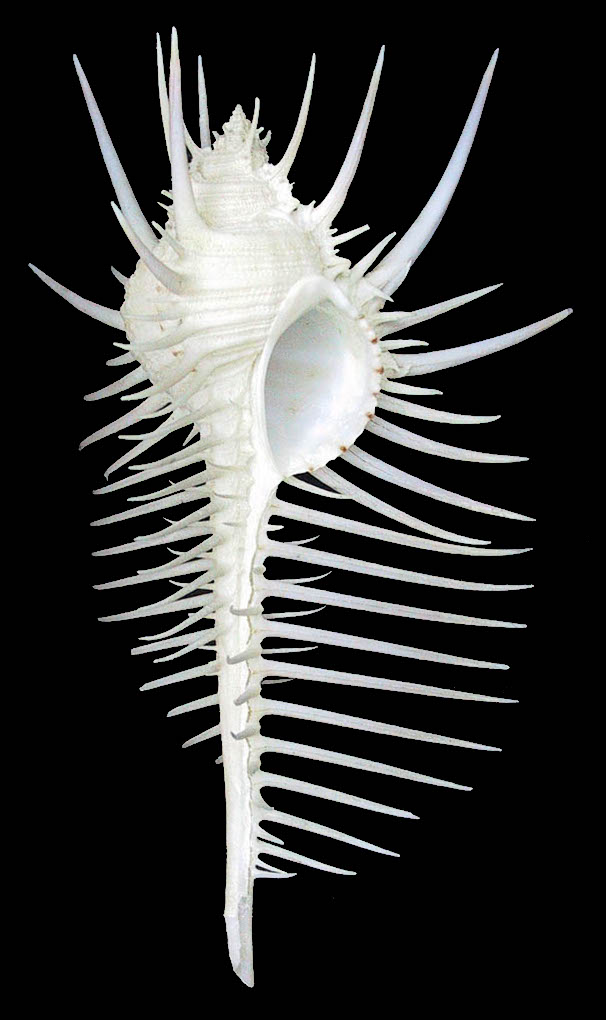
- Shell of a Murex sea snail
  Murex
  - †Murex angulatus
  - †Murex fusates
  - †Murex migus
- Murexiella
  - †Murexiella vaughani – type locality for species
- †Murotriton
  - †Murotriton mcglameriae
- Mustelus
  - †Mustelus rodgersi
- Myliobatis
  - †Myliobatis dixoni
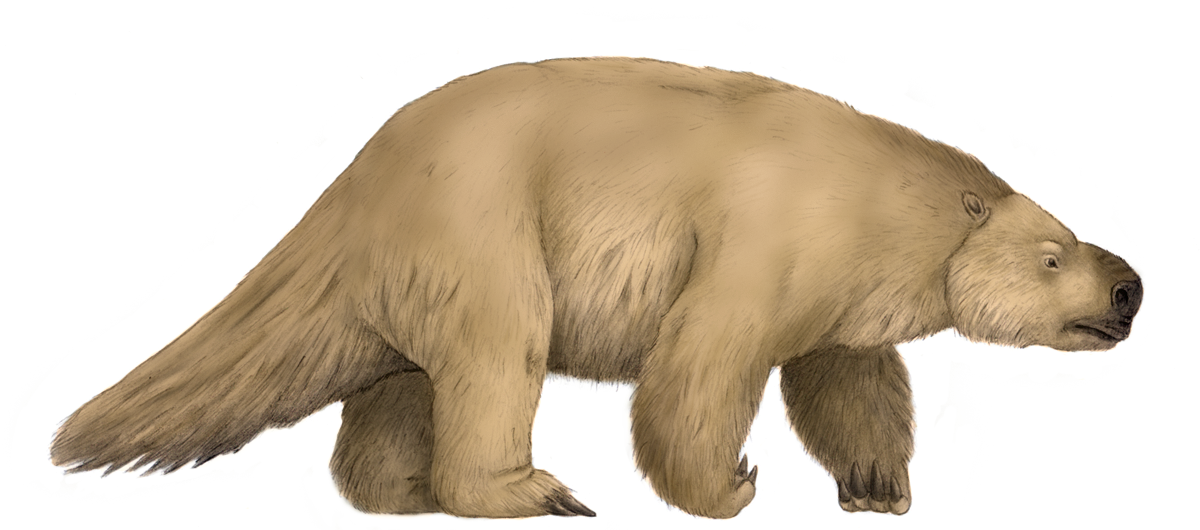
- Life restoration of the Pleistocene-Holocene ground sloth Mylodon with an inset depicting its excrement and a skin fragment
  †Mylodon
- Myrtea
  - †Myrtea curta
  - †Myrtea scopularis
  - †Myrtea vicksburgensis
- †Mytea
  - †Mytea vicksburgensis

== N ==
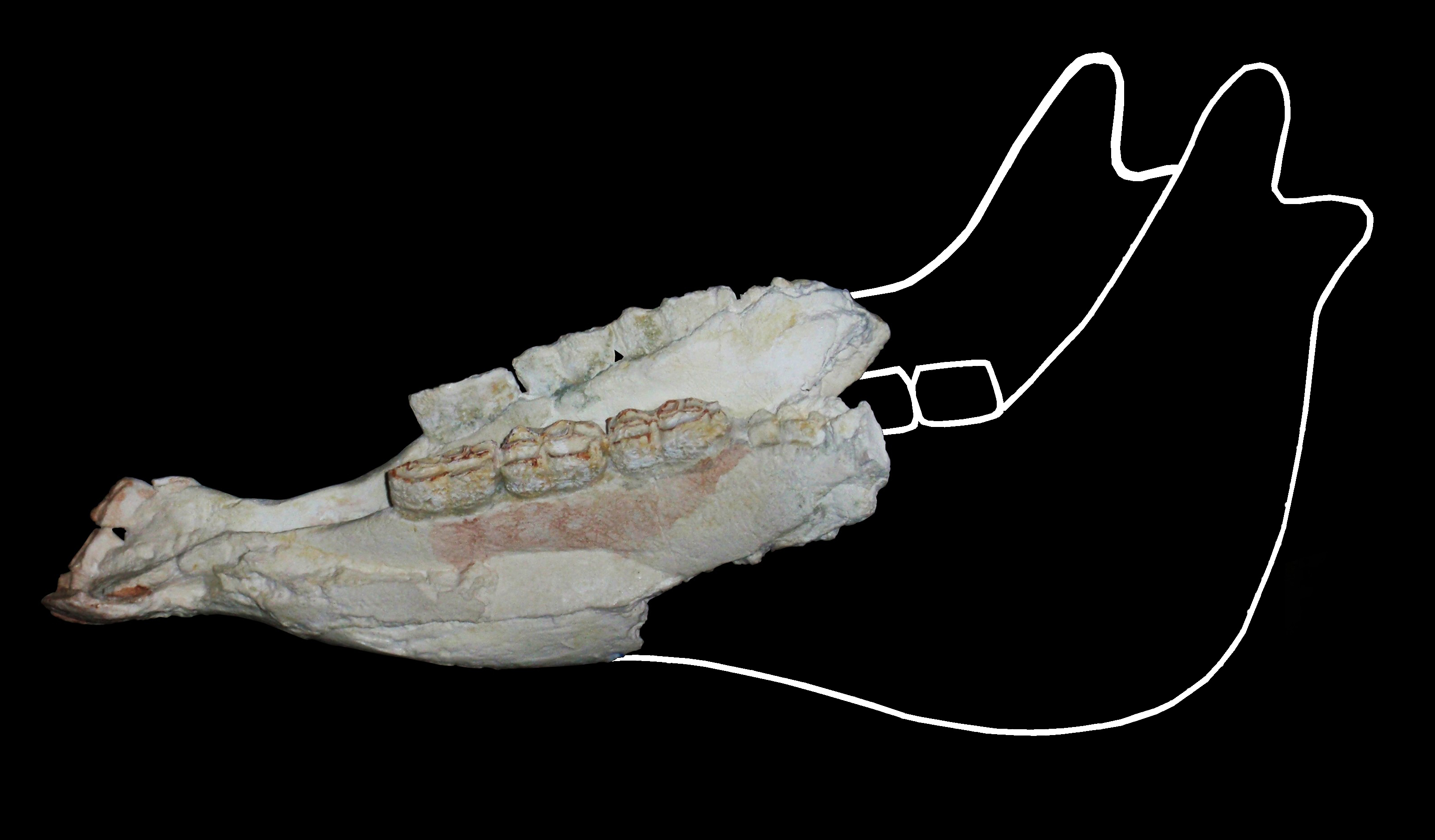
- Partial fossilized mandible of the Miocene-Pliocene horse Nannippus
  †Nannippus
  - †Nannippus minor
- †Naranius
  - †Naranius americanus – type locality for species
- Nassarius
  - †Nassarius albirupina
  - †Nassarius exilis
  - †Nassarius hilli
  - †Nassarius jacksonensis
  - †Nassarius macilenta
  - †Nassarius mississippiensis
- †Natchitochia
  - †Natchitochia jonesi
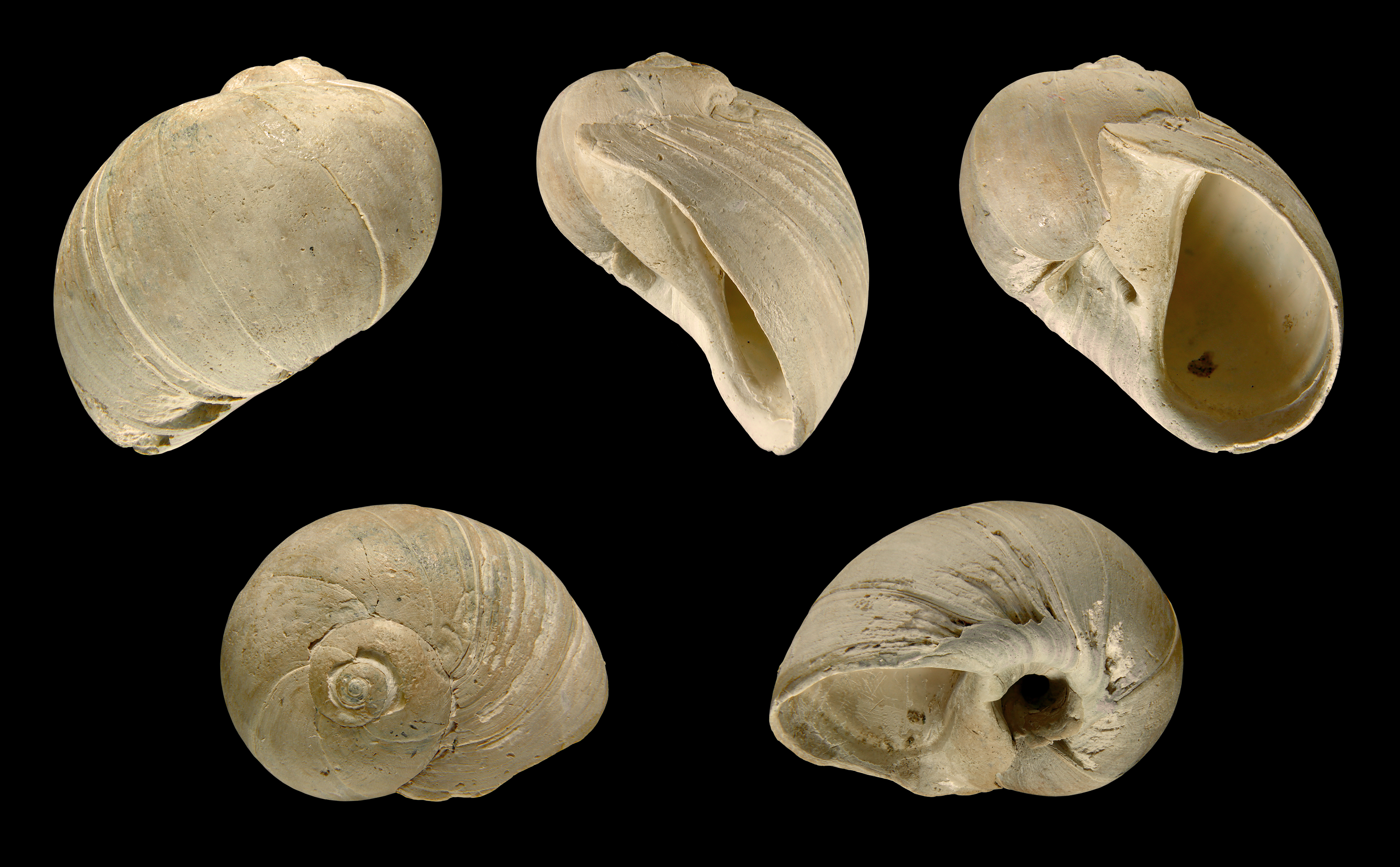
- Multiple views of a fossilized shell belonging to a Natica moon snail
  Natica
  - †Natica acuticallosa
  - †Natica aperta
  - †Natica caseyi
  - †Natica mississippiensis
  - †Natica pennunda
  - †Natica permunda
- Naticarius
  - †Naticarius acuticaliosa – type locality for species
  - †Naticarius semilunata
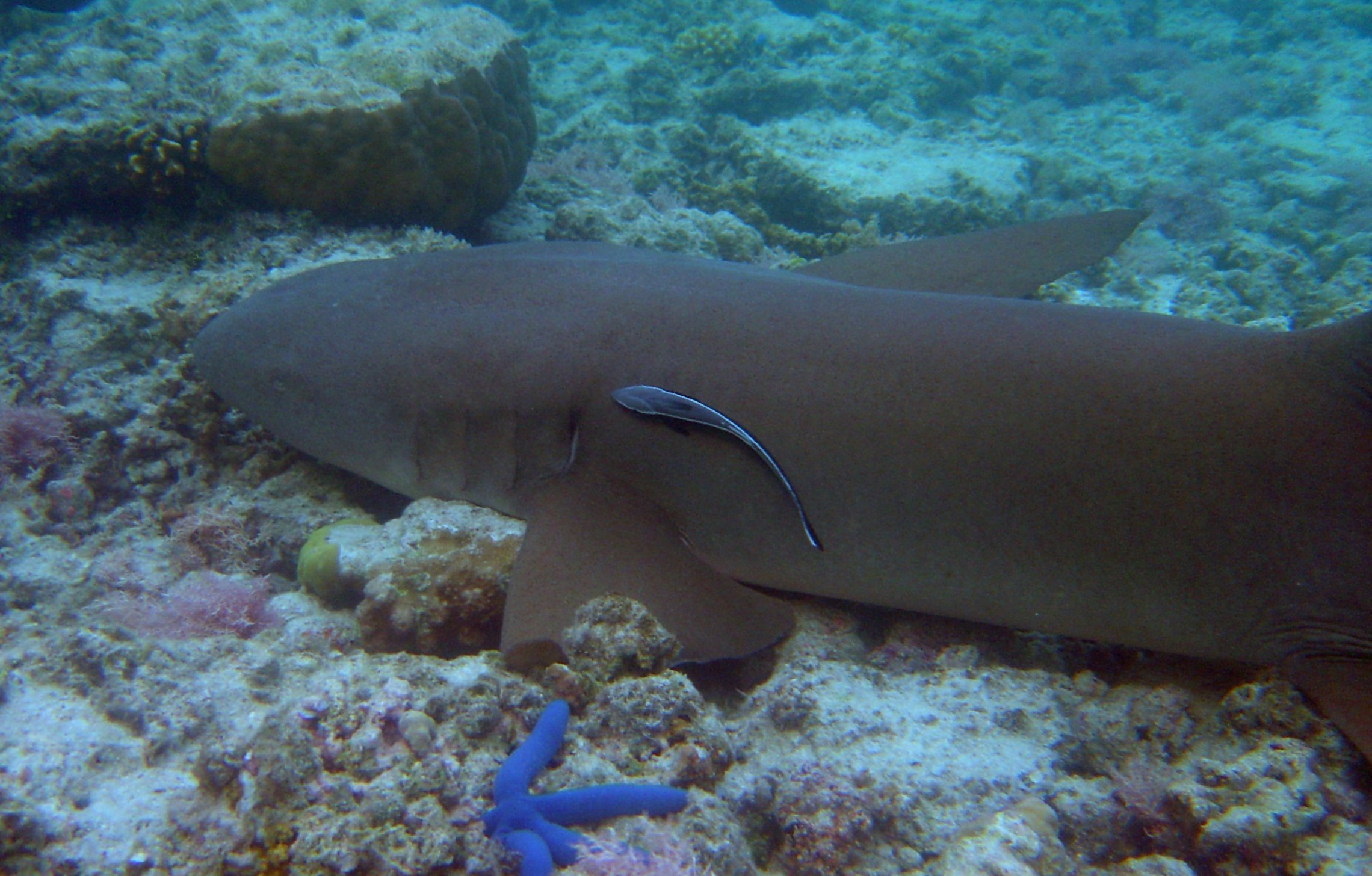
- Close-up portrait of a living Nebrius nurse shark
  Nebrius
  - †Nebrius thielensis
- Nellia
  - †Nellia bifaciata
  - †Nellia tenella
- Nemocardium
  - †Nemocardium diversum
  - †Nemocardium eocenense
  - †Nemocardium harrisi
  - †Nemocardium nicoletti
  - †Nemocardium nicolletti
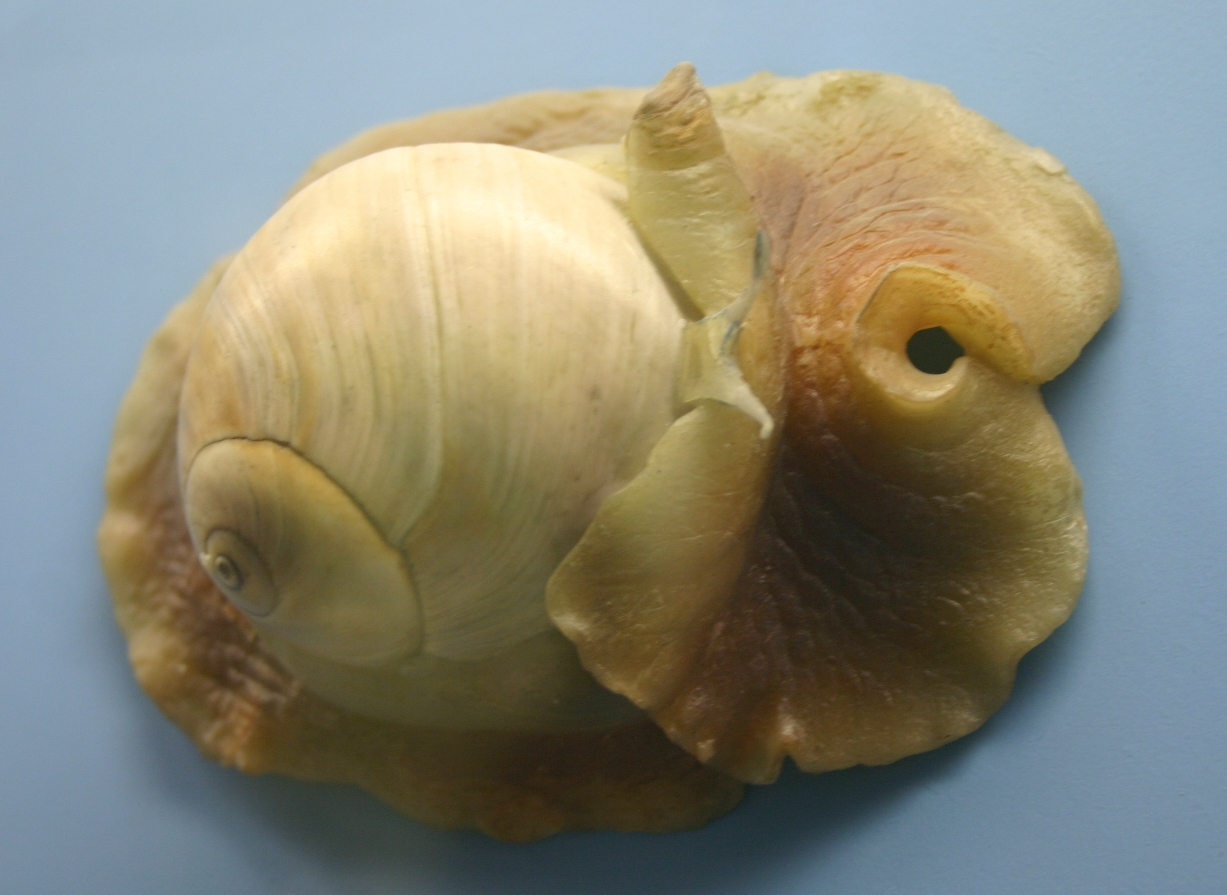
- Preserved Neverita moon sea snail
  Neverita
- Niso
  - †Niso umbilicata
- Nonion
  - †Nonion depressulum
  - †Nonion plnatum
- Norrisia
  - †Norrisia micromphala
- †Notiotitanops – type locality for genus
  - †Notiotitanops mississippiensis – type locality for species
- †Nucleopsis
  - †Nucleopsis subvaricata
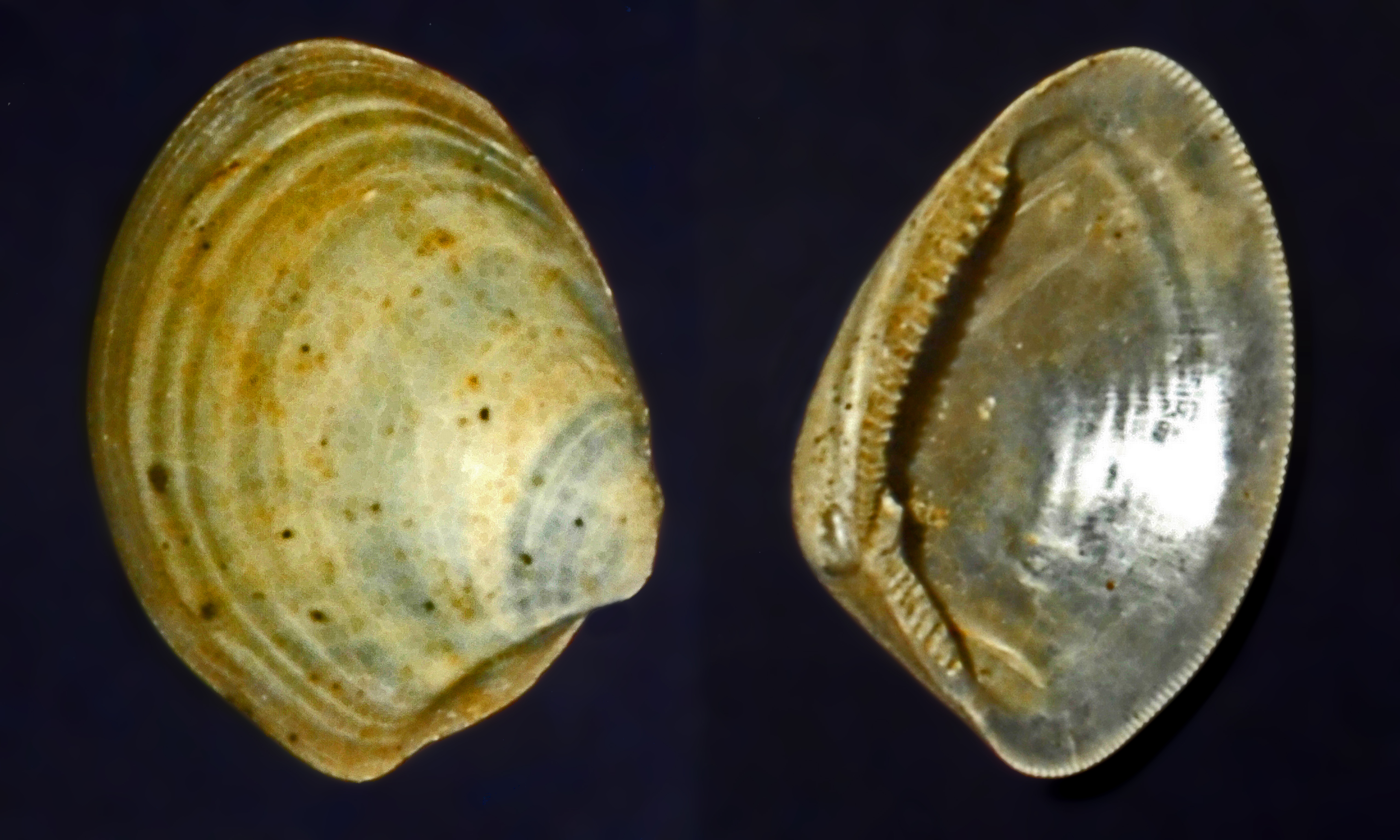
- Interior of a fossilized shell of the Early Ordovician-modern marine bivalve Nucula
  Nucula
  - †Nucula magnifica
  - †Nucula mauricensis
  - †Nucula ovula
  - †Nucula smithvillensis
  - †Nucula sphenopsis
  - †Nucula tallahalaensis – type locality for species
  - †Nucula vicksburgensis
  - †Nucula yazooensis
- Nuculana
  - †Nuculana akidota – type locality for species
  - †Nuculana linifera
  - †Nuculana multilineata
  - †Nuculana smithvillensis – or unidentified comparable form
  - †Nuculana spheniopsis
  - †Nuculana wautubbeana

== O ==
- †Ochetosella
  - †Ochetosella jacksonica
- Oculina
  - †Oculina aldrichi – type locality for species
  - †Oculina harrisi – type locality for species
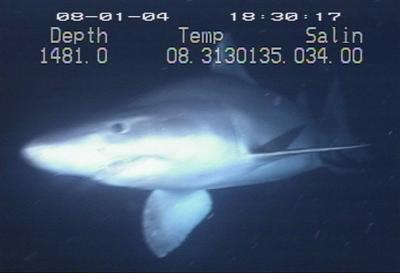
- A living Odontaspis sand shark
  Odontaspis
  - †Odontaspis borodini – type locality for species
  - †Odontaspis hopei
  - †Odontaspis hynei – type locality for species
  - †Odontaspis speyeri
  - †Odontaspis substriatus
  - †Odontaspis winkleri
- †Odontogryphaea
- Odostomia
  - †Odostomia boettgeri
  - †Odostomia byramensis – type locality for species
  - †Odostomia jacksonensis
  - †Odostomia melanella
  - †Odostomia vicksburgella – type locality for species
- †Ogivalina
  - †Ogivalina elongata
- †Oligotresium
  - †Oligotresium vicksburgensis
- Oliva
  - †Oliva affluens
  - †Oliva mississippiensis
- Oncousoecia
  - †Oncousoecia quinqueseriata – type locality for species
- Onychocella
  - †Onychocella celsa
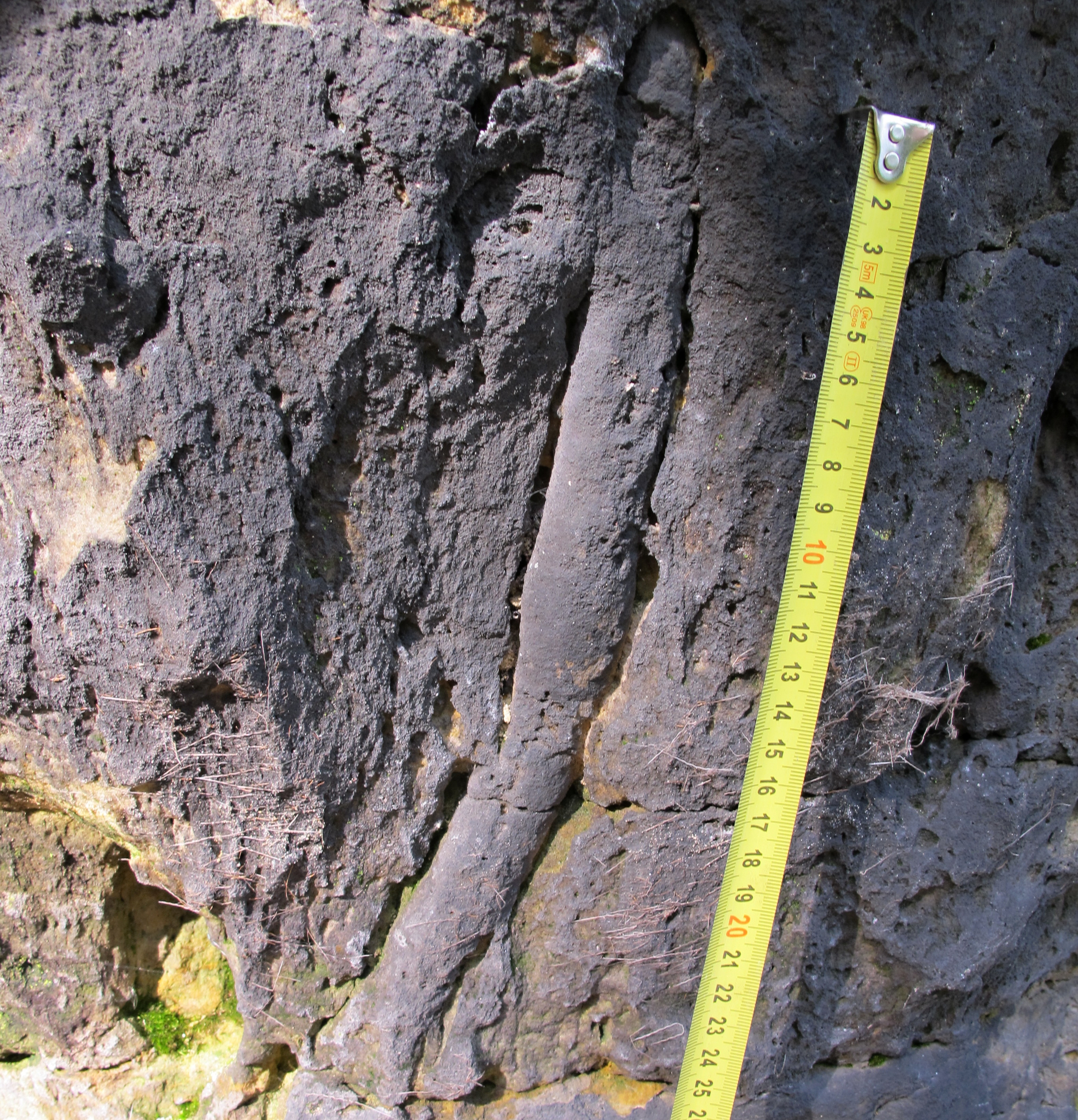
- Fossil of the Permian-modern crustacean burrow ichnogenus Ophiomorpha
  †Ophiomorpha
- †Orthosurcula
  - †Orthosurcula byramensis
  - †Orthosurcula langdoni
  - †Orthosurcula longiforma
- Orthoyoldia
  - †Orthoyoldia psammotaea
  - †Orthoyoldia rubamnis
- Osthimosia
  - †Osthimosia glomerata
- Ostrea
  - †Ostrea brevifronta
  - †Ostrea falco
  - †Ostrea paroxis
  - †Ostrea pulaskensis
  - †Ostrea sinuosa – or unidentified comparable form
  - †Ostrea westi
- Otionella
  - †Otionella perforata
  - †Otionella tuberosa
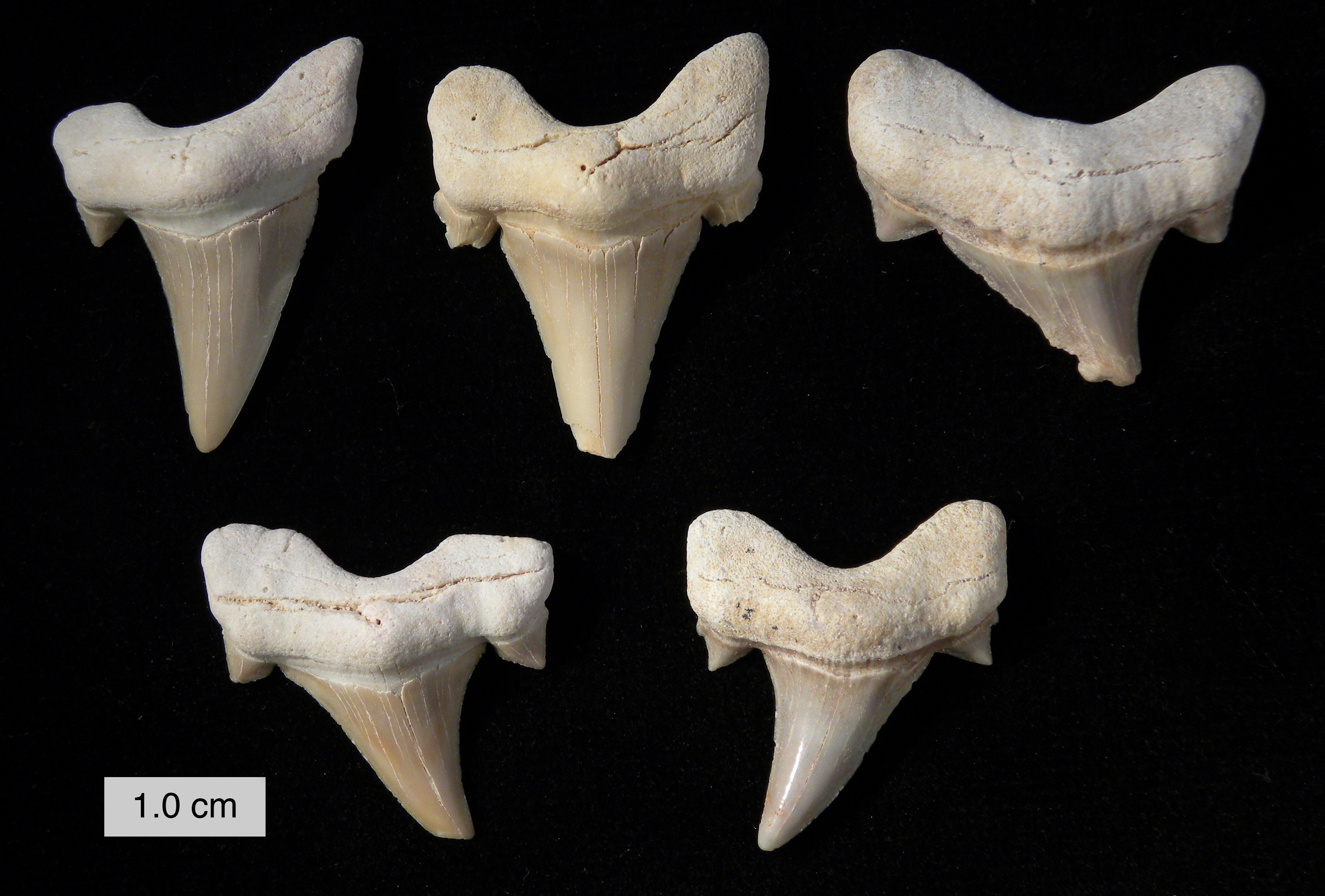
- Fossilized teeth of the Paleocene–Miocene shark Otodus
  †Otodus
  - †Otodus angustidens
- †Otolithus
  - †Otolithus americanus
  - †Otolithus brevior
  - †Otolithus claybornensis
  - †Otolithus comes
  - †Otolithus cor
  - †Otolithus debilis
  - †Otolithus elegantus
  - †Otolithus glaber
  - †Otolithus hospes
  - †Otolithus insuetus
  - †Otolithus laevigatus
  - †Otolithus meyeri
  - †Otolithus sector
  - †Otolithus similis
  - †Otolithus sulcatus
- †Otostomia
  - †Otostomia melanella
- †Ottoina
  - †Ottoina kinkelini
- †Oxyrhina
  - †Oxyrhina praecursor

== P ==
- †Pachecoa
  - †Pachecoa catonis
  - †Pachecoa declivis
  - †Pachecoa pulchra
- †Pachygaleus
  - †Pachygaleus lefevrei
- †Palaeocybium
  - †Palaeocybium proosti
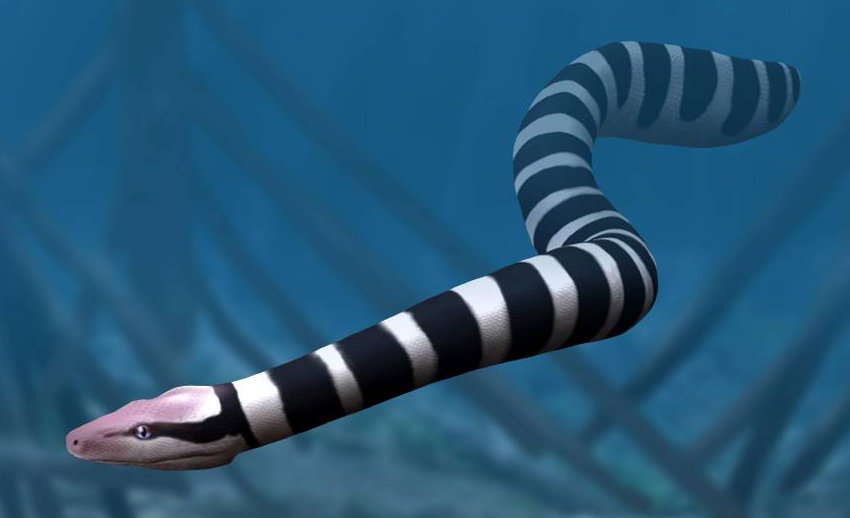
- Restoration of the Cretaceous-Eocene sea snake Palaeophis
  †Palaeophis
  - †Palaeophis casei – type locality for species
  - †Palaeophis littoralis
  - †Palaeophis virginianus
- †Palaeosinopa
  - †Palaeosinopa aestuarium – type locality for species
- Panopea
  - †Panopea bitruncata
  - †Panopea oblongata
- Panthera
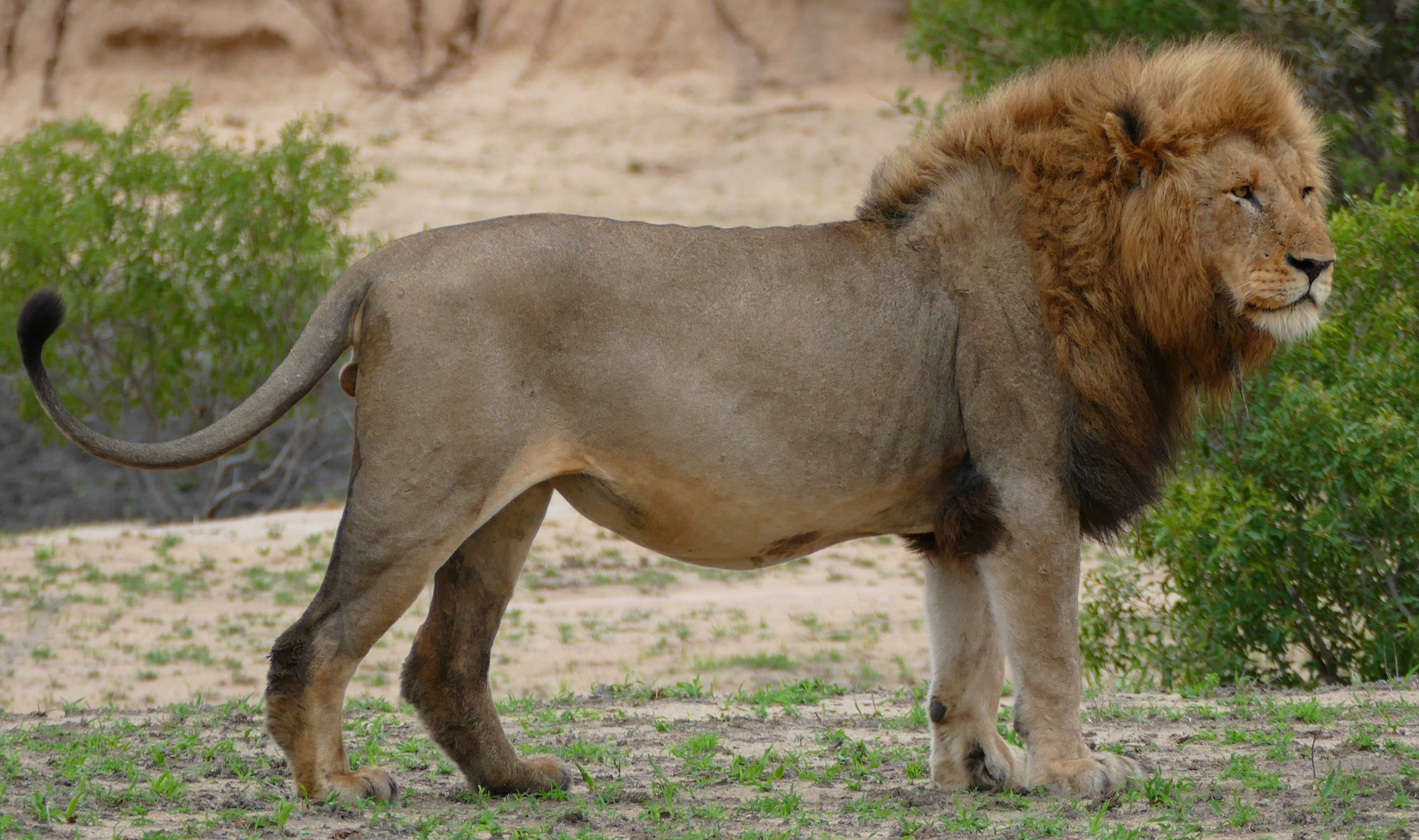
  - A living Panthera leo, or lion
    †Panthera leo
- †Papillina
  - †Papillina dumosa
- Paracyathus
  - †Paracyathus alternatus
  - †Paracyathus bellus – type locality for species
- †Paramys
  - †Paramys dispar – type locality for species
- Parvilucina
  - †Parvilucina posteocurta – type locality for species
- †Patulaxis
  - †Patulaxis scrobiculata
- Pecten
  - †Pecten byramensis
  - †Pecten perplanus
  - †Pecten poulsoni
- Penion
  - †Penion bellus
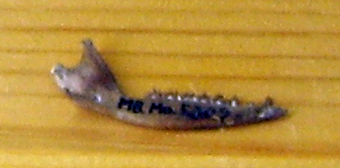
- Fossilized mandible of the Eocene-Miocene mammal Peratherium
  †Peratherium
  - †Peratherium macgrewi
- †Periarchus
  - †Periarchus lyelli
- Perigastrella
  - †Perigastrella oscitans – type locality for species
  - †Perigastrella plana
  - †Perigastrella rectilineata
- Periploma
  - †Periploma claibornense
  - †Periploma macneili – type locality for species
- †Peristomella
  - †Peristomella laticella
- Petaloconchus
  - †Petaloconchus transcostatus – type locality for species
- Petrophyllia
  - †Petrophyllia vicksburgensis
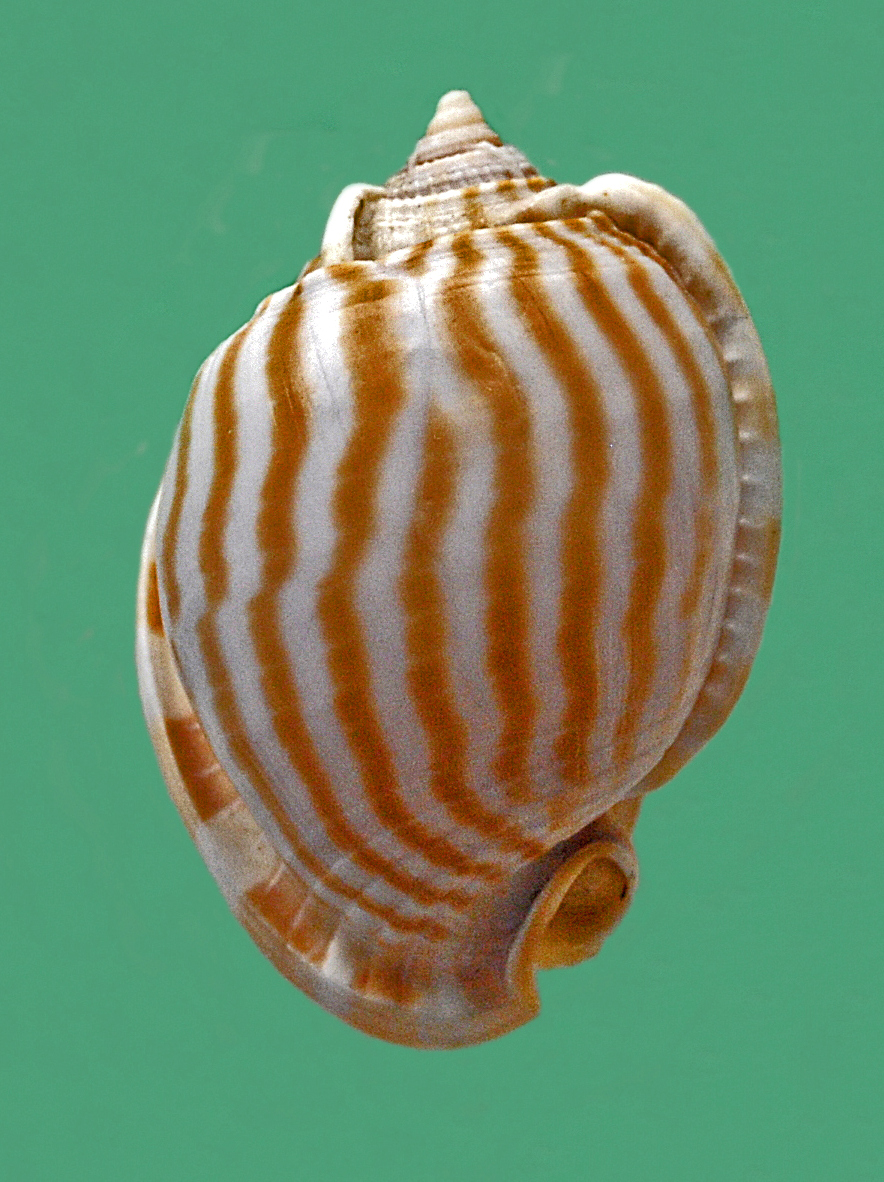
- Shell of a Phalium, or bonnet shell sea snail
  Phalium
  - †Phalium brevicostatum
  - †Phalium johnsoni
  - †Phalium menthafons – type locality for species
  - †Phalium mississippiensis
  - †Phalium taitii
- †Phandella
  - †Phandella nepionica
  - †Phandella transemma – type locality for species
- Philine
  - †Philine dockeryi
- Pholadomya
- Pholas
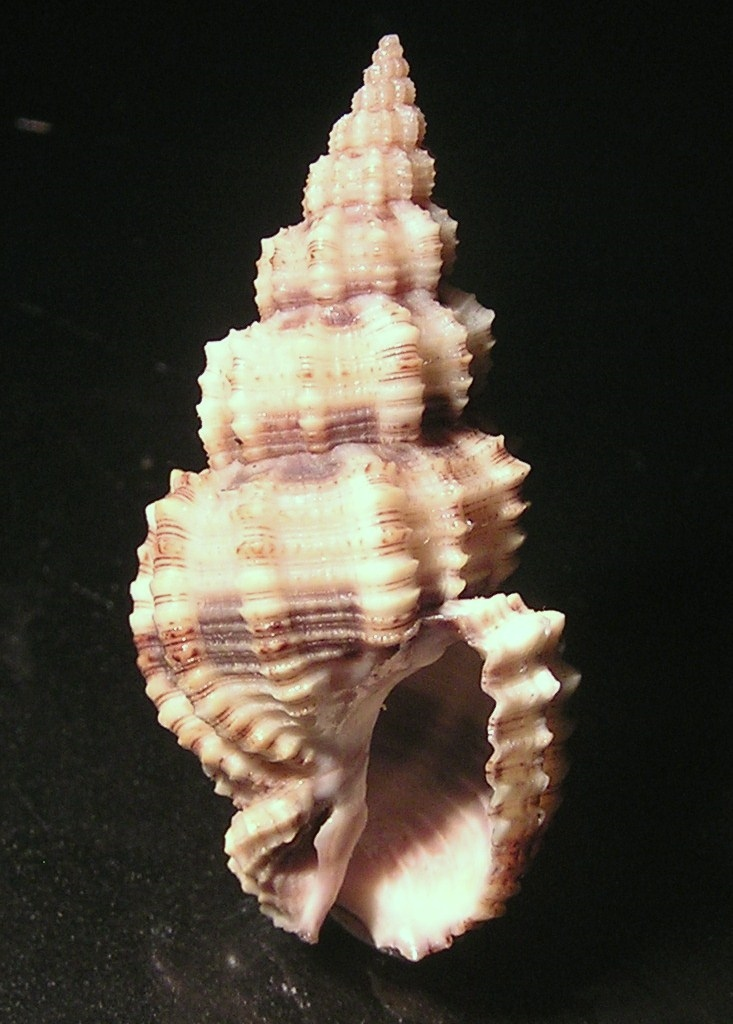
- Shell of a Phos nassa mud snail
  Phos
  - †Phos jacksonense
  - †Phos sagenum
  - †Phos texanum
  - †Phos texanus
  - †Phos vicksburgensis
- Phyllodus
  - †Phyllodus toliapicus
- Phyllonotus
  - †Phyllonotus mississippiensis
- †Physogaleus
  - †Physogaleus americanus – type locality for species
  - †Physogaleus tertius
- †Pisodus
  - †Pisodus oweni
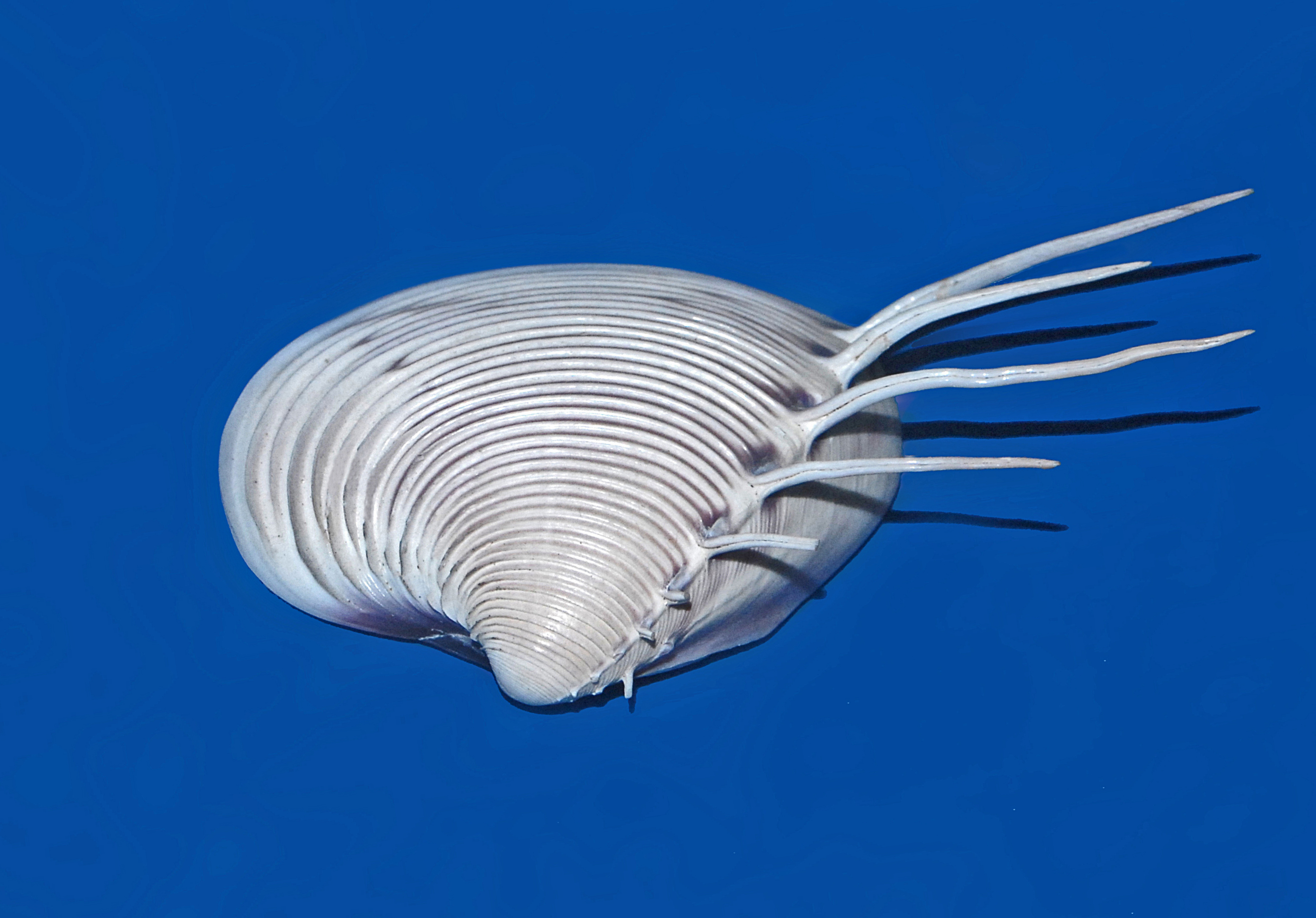
- Shell of a Pitar venus clam
  Pitar
  - †Pitar aldrichi – type locality for species
  - †Pitar astartiformis
  - †Pitar calcanea
  - †Pitar imitabilis
  - †Pitar megacostata – type locality for species
  - †Pitar nuttalliopsis
  - †Pitar perbrevis
  - †Pitar petroplitanus
  - †Pitar petropolitanus
  - †Pitar protena – type locality for species
  - †Pitar securiformis
  - †Pitar semipunctata
  - †Pitar texacola
  - †Pitar trigoniata
- †Plagiarca
  - †Plagiarca rhomboidella
- †Plagioctenodon
  - †Plagioctenodon dormaalensis
- Plagioecia
  - †Plagioecia hirta
- †Platycoenia – type locality for genus
  - †Platycoenia jacksonensis – type locality for species
- †Platyoptera
  - †Platyoptera extenta
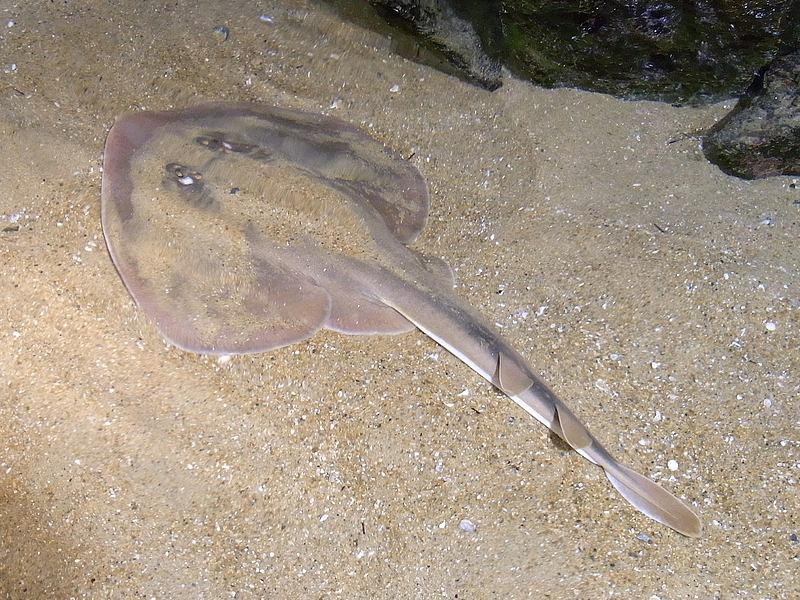
- A living Platyrhina ray
  Platyrhina
  - †Platyrhina dockeryi – type locality for species
- Platytrochus
  - †Platytrochus elegans
  - †Platytrochus goldfussi
  - †Platytrochus stokesi
- Plectodon
  - †Plectodon intastriata
- Pleurofusia
  - †Pleurofusia clarkeana
  - †Pleurofusia collaris
  - †Pleurofusia danvicola
  - †Pleurofusia decliva
  - †Pleurofusia elegantula – type locality for species
  - †Pleurofusia fessa – type locality for species
  - †Pleurofusia fluctuosa
  - †Pleurofusia hilgardi
  - †Pleurofusia hiwanneensis – type locality for species
  - †Pleurofusia longirostropis
  - †Pleurofusia longirostropsis
  - †Pleurofusia oblivia
  - †Pleurofusia servata
- †Pleuroliria
  - †Pleuroliria cochlearis
  - †Pleuroliria jacksonella
  - †Pleuroliria subsimilis
- Pleuromeris
  - †Pleuromeris inflatior
  - †Pleuromeris inflator
  - †Pleuromeris parva
  - †Pleuromeris quadrata
  - †Pleuromeris tortidens
- †Pleuronea
  - †Pleuronea fenestrata
  - †Pleuronea subpertusa
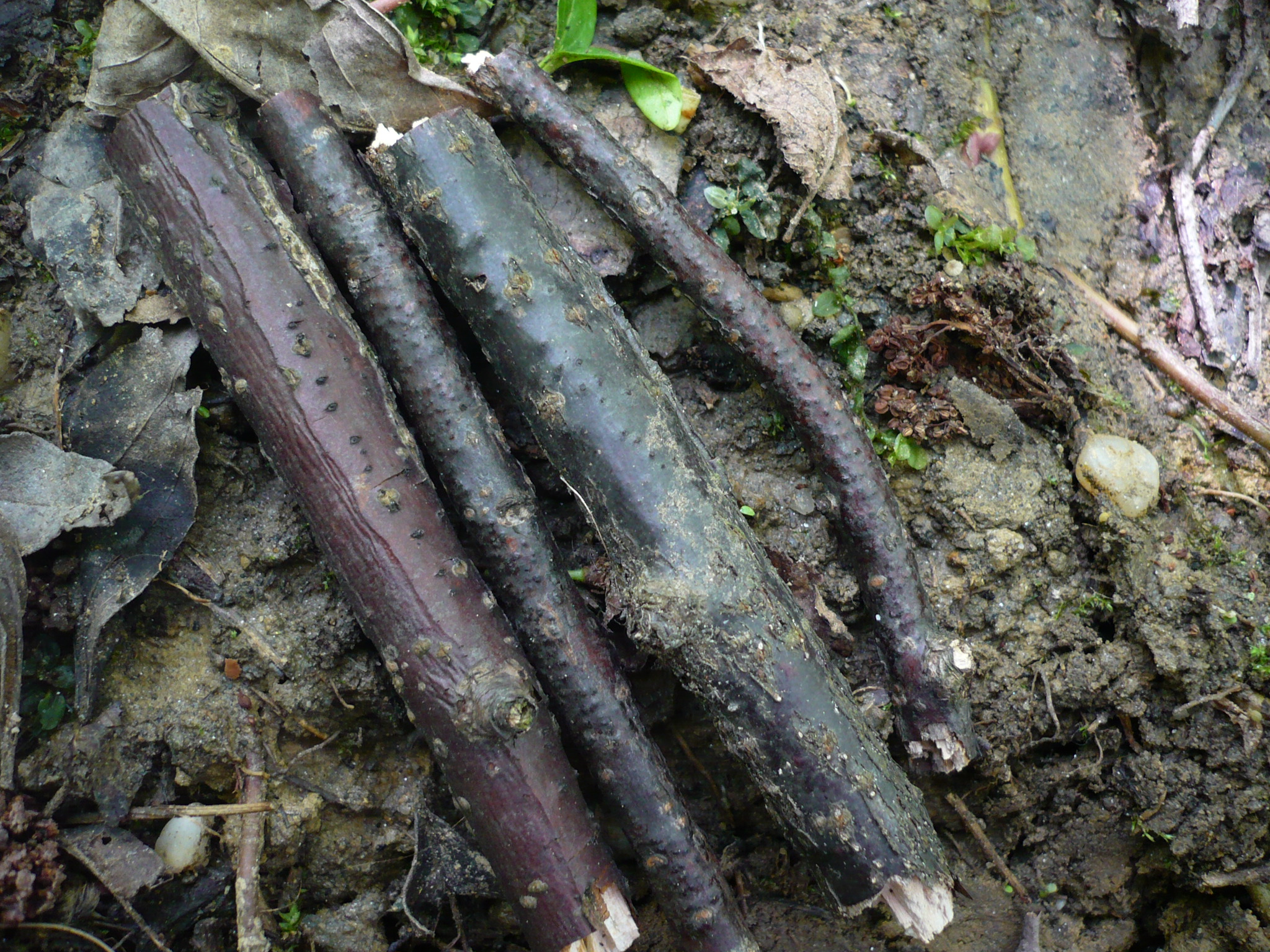
- A living Pleurostoma fungus
  †Pleurostoma
  - †Pleurostoma adolescens
  - †Pleurostoma rebeccae
- Pleurotoma
  - †Pleurotoma cristata - original combination for Cochlespira cristata; type species for Cochlespira
- Plicatula
  - †Plicatula filamentosa
  - †Plicatula variplicata – type locality for species
- Pliciscala
  - †Pliciscala albitesta
  - †Pliciscala byramensis – type locality for species
  - †Pliciscala caseyi – type locality for species
  - †Pliciscala cribrum
  - †Pliciscala pearlensis
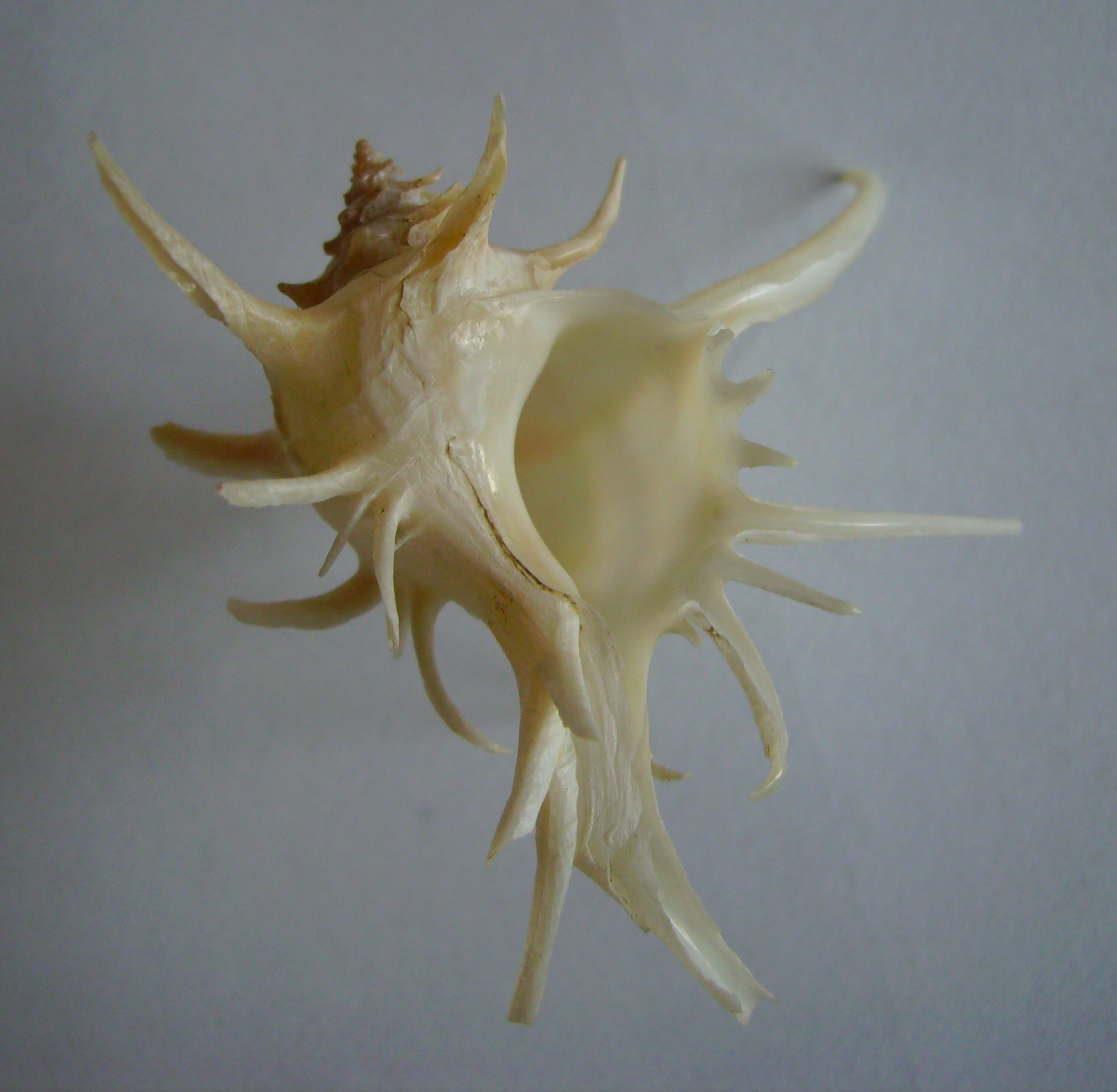
- Shell of a Poirieria murex snail
  Poirieria
  - †Poirieria macneili – type locality for species
- Polinices
  - †Polinices aratus
  - †Polinices weisbordi
- †Polyascosoecia
  - †Polyascosoecia imbricata
- Polyschides
  - †Polyschides margarita
- Porella
  - †Porella compacta – type locality for species
  - †Porella coronata
  - †Porella granulosa
  - †Porella irregularis
  - †Porella jacksonica
  - †Porella pungens
- Poromya
  - †Poromya mississippiensis
- †Potamides
- †Priscoficus
  - †Priscoficus juvenis
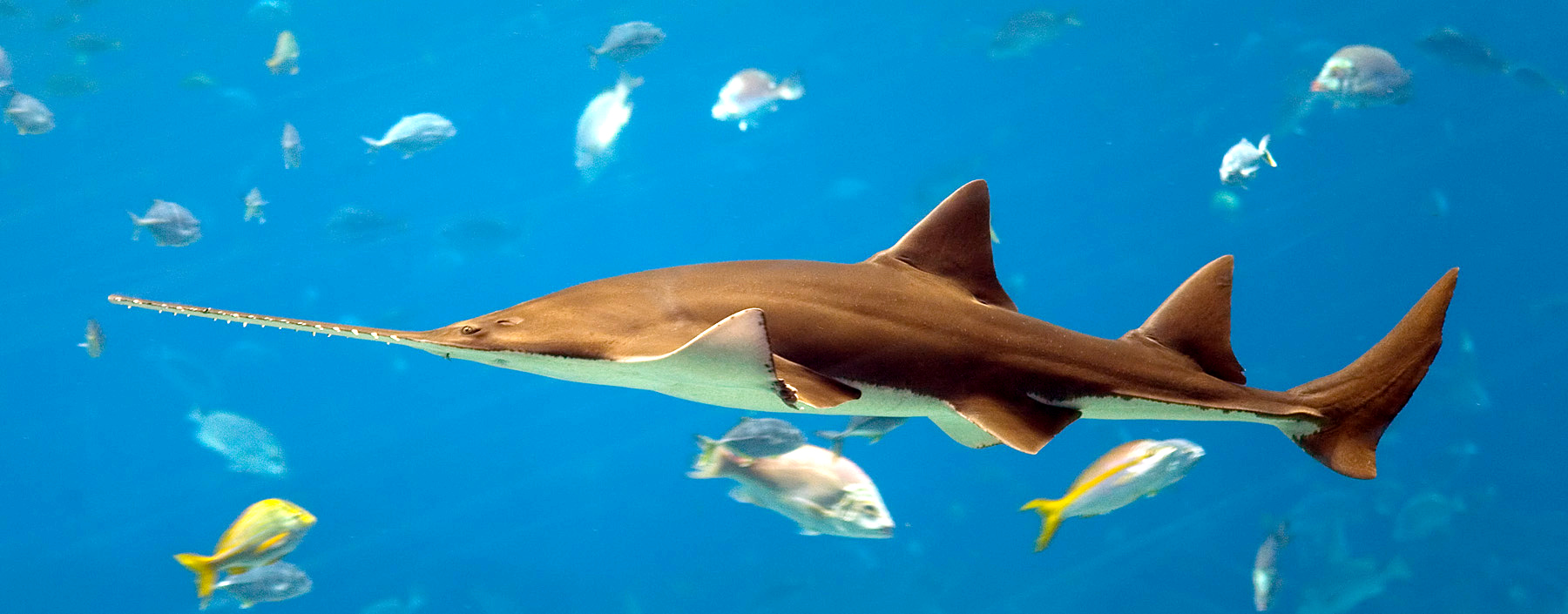
- A living Pristis sawfish
  Pristis
  - †Pristis lathami
- Proboscina
  - †Proboscina geminata
- †Projenneria
  - †Projenneria ludoviciana
- †Protoscutella
  - †Protoscutella mississippensis
  - †Protoscutella mississippiensis – type locality for species
- †Protosurcula
  - †Protosurcula gabbii
- †Prototomus
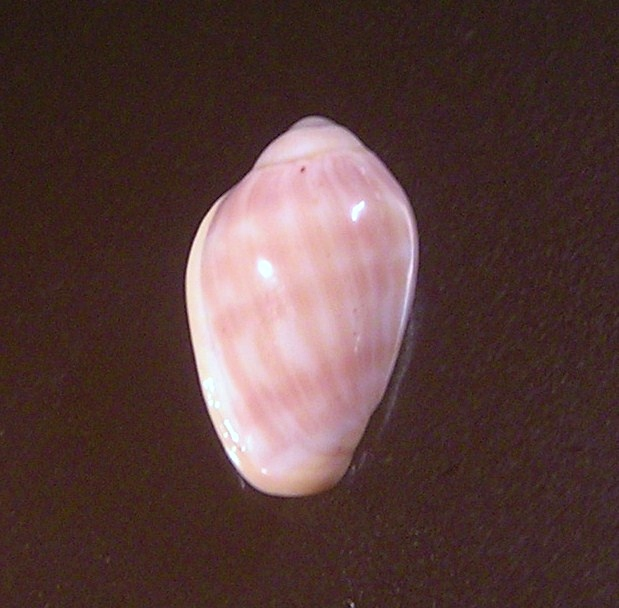
- Shell of a Prunum margin sea snail
  Prunum
  - †Prunum columba
- Pseudamussium
  - †Pseudamussium corneoides
- †Pseudodontaspis
  - †Pseudodontaspis lauderdalensis – type locality for species
  - †Pseudodontaspis mississippiensis – type locality for species
- †Pseudofulgur – type locality for genus
  - †Pseudofulgur lirata – type locality for species
  - †Pseudofulgur vicksburgensis
- †Pseudolatirus
  - †Pseudolatirus tortilis
- Pseudoliva
  - †Pseudoliva perspectiva
  - †Pseudoliva santander
  - †Pseudoliva vestusta
  - †Pseudoliva vetusta
- Pseudomalaxis
  - †Pseudomalaxis rotella
- Pteria
  - †Pteria argentea
  - †Pteria limula
  - †Pteria vanwinkleae
- †Pterochelus
  - †Pterochelus angelus
- †Pteropsella
  - †Pteropsella lapidosa
- †Pterosphenus
  - †Pterosphenus schucherti
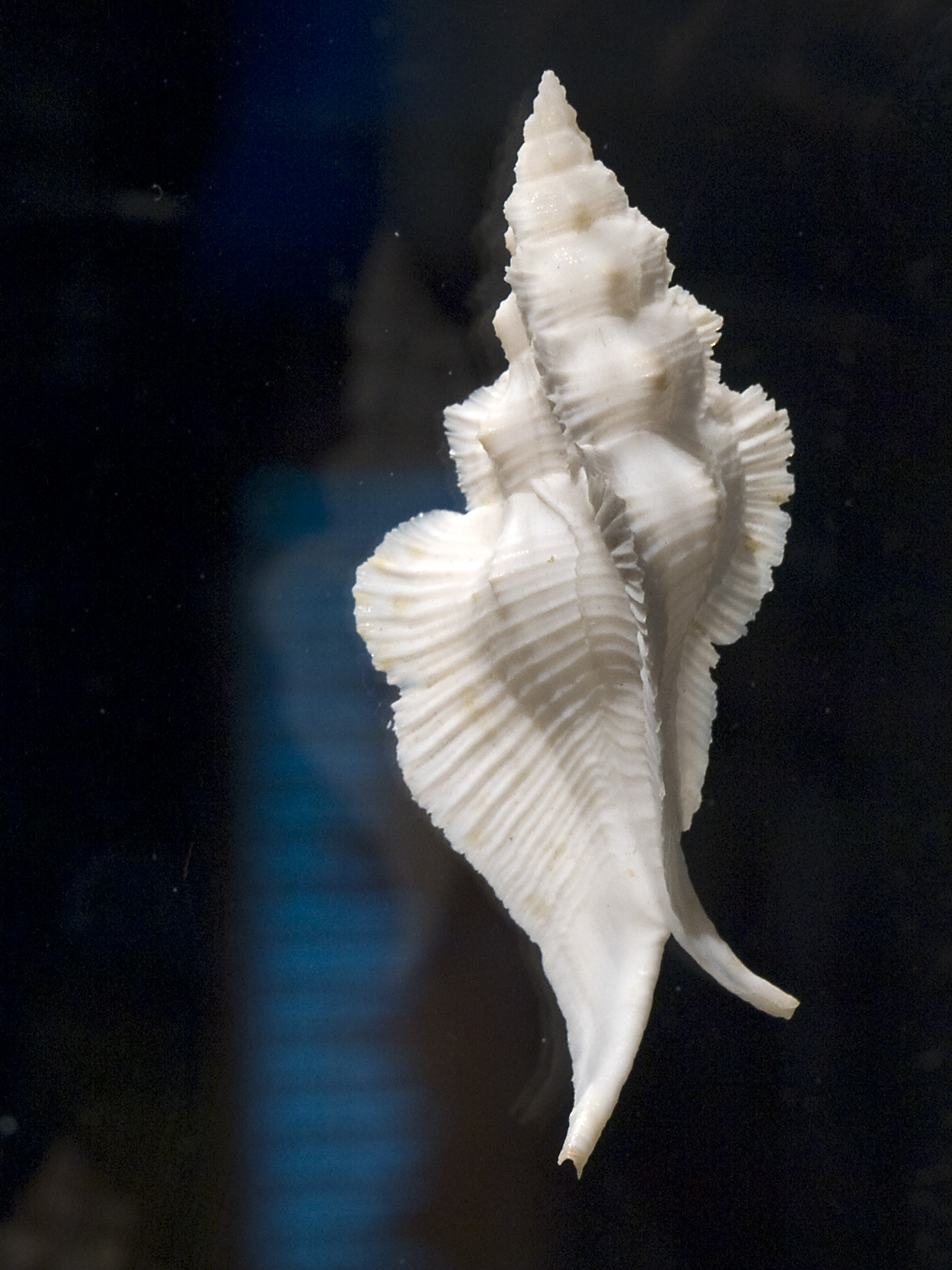
- Shell of a Pterynotus murex sea snail
  Pterynotus
  - †Pterynotus burnsii
- Puellina
  - †Puellina radiata
- Puncturella
  - †Puncturella jacksonensis
- Pycnodonte
  - †Pycnodonte johnsoni
  - †Pycnodonte trigonalis
  - †Pycnodonte vicksburgensis
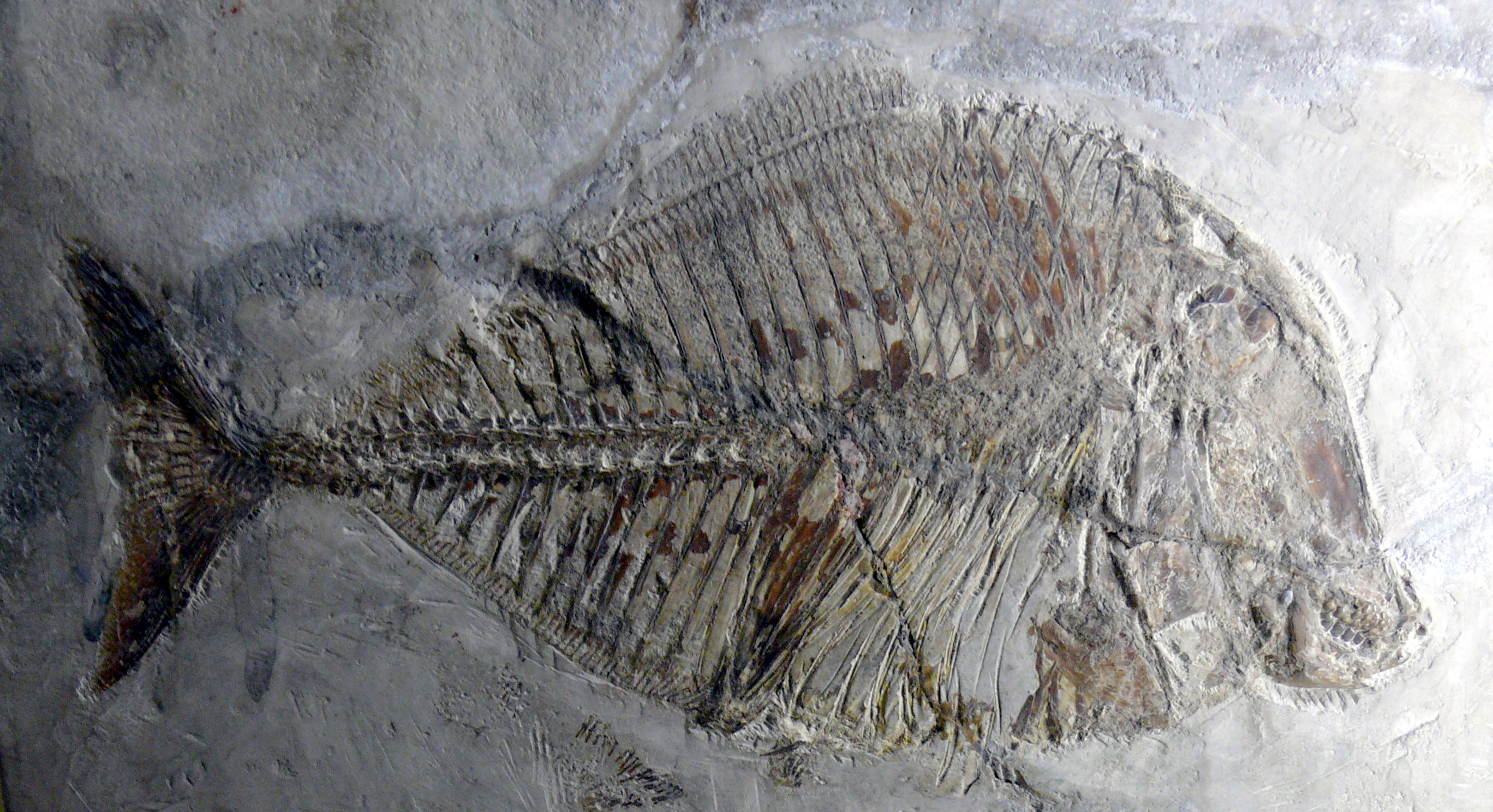
- Fossilized skeleton of the Late Cretaceous-Eocene bony fish Pycnodus
  Pycnodus
  - †Pycnodus bowerbanki
- Pyramidella
  - †Pyramidella bastropensis
  - †Pyramidella crassispirata
  - †Pyramidella dalli
  - †Pyramidella meyeri
  - †Pyramidella propeacicula
  - †Pyramidella pseudopymaea
- †Pyramimitra
  - †Pyramimitra quadralirata
  - †Pyramimitra terebraeformis
- Pyrunculus
  - †Pyrunculus laevipyrum

== R ==
- Rangia
  - †Rangia cuneata
  - †Rangia johnsoni
- Raphitoma
  - †Raphitoma veatchi – or unidentified comparable form
- †Rectonychocella
  - †Rectonychocella tenuis
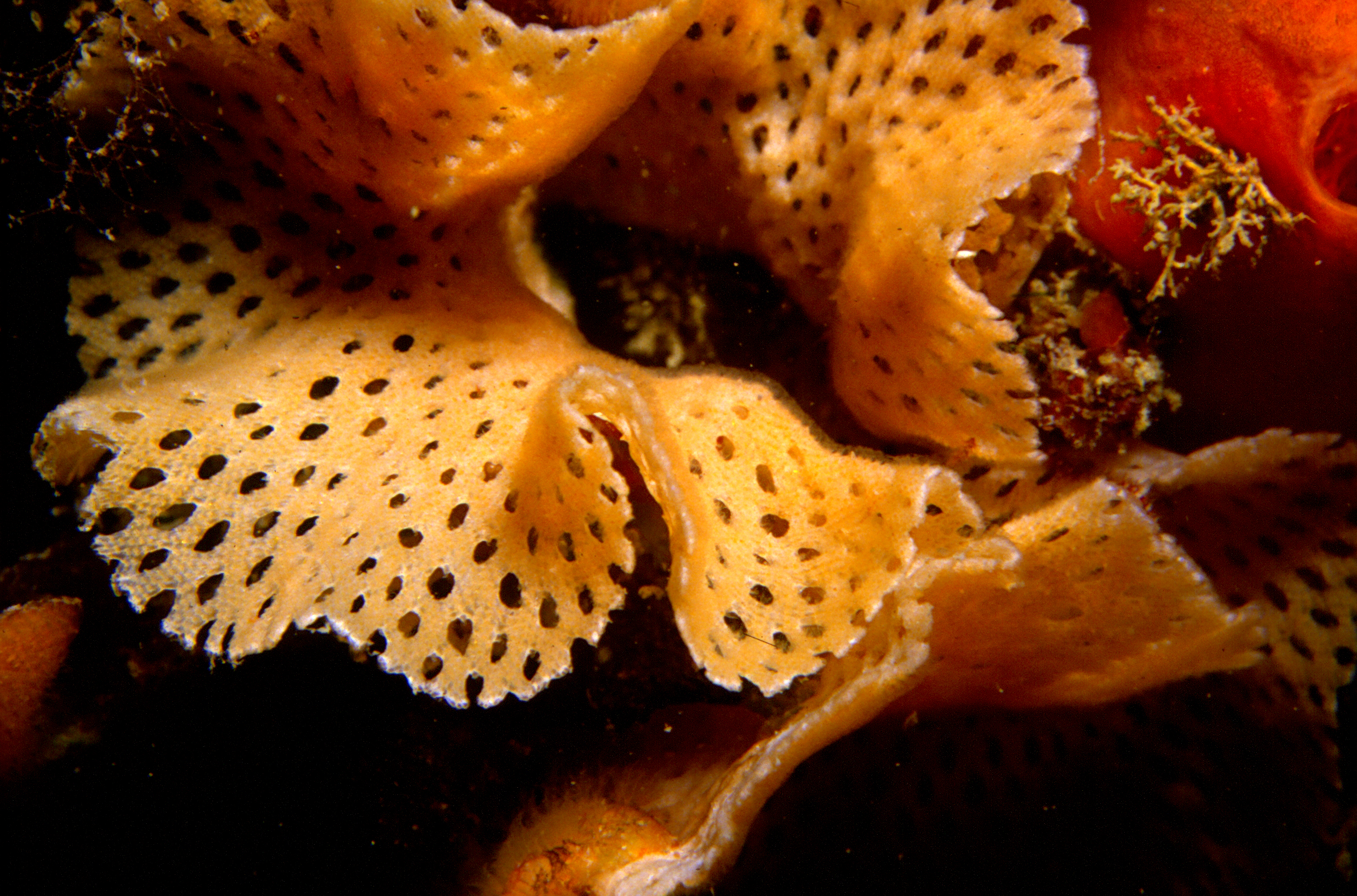
- Living Reteporella bryozoan ("moss animal")
  Reteporella
  - †Reteporella laciniosa
- Retusa
  - †Retusa galba
  - †Retusa jacksonensis
  - †Retusa sylvaerupis
- Rhinobatos
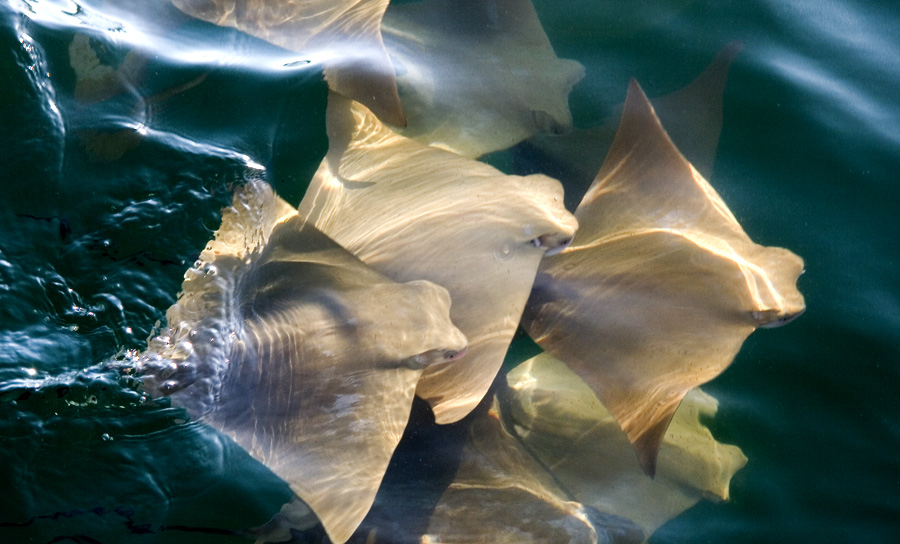
- A school of living Rhinoptera, or cownose rays
  Rhinoptera
- Rhizorus – or unidentified comparable form
  - †Rhizorus volutatus
- Rhynchoconger
  - †Rhynchoconger sanctus
- Rictaxis
  - †Rictaxis andersoni
- Ringicula
  - †Ringicula biplicata
  - †Ringicula crassata – type locality for species
  - †Ringicula mississippiensis
- Rissoina
  - †Rissoina mississippiensis

== S ==
- †Sablea
  - †Sablea minuta
- Saccella
  - †Saccella catasarca
  - †Saccella robusta
- †Samelina
  - †Samelina pilsbryi
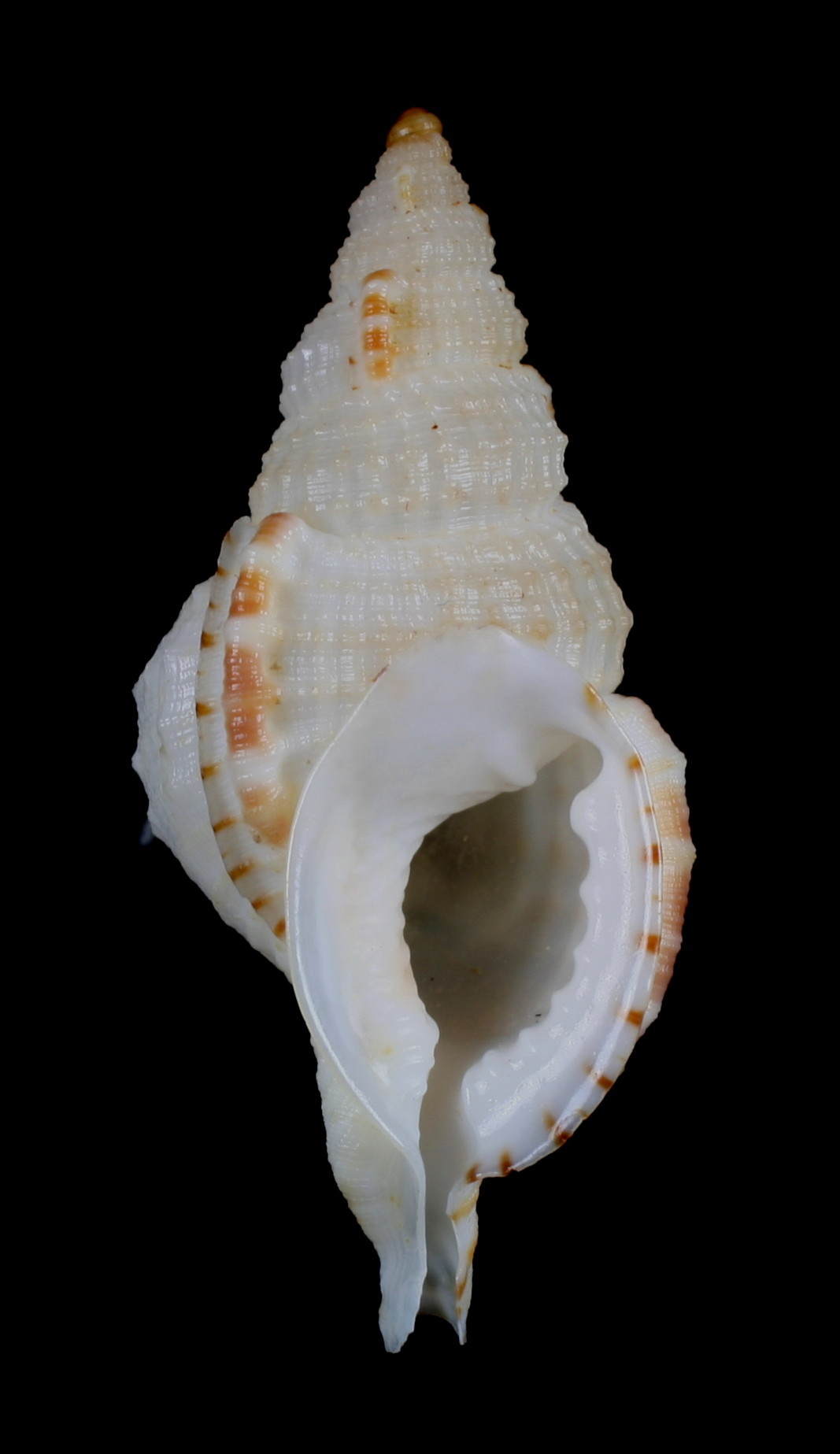
- Shell of a Sassia triton sea snail
  Sassia
  - †Sassia abbreviata
  - †Sassia conradiana
  - †Sassia jacksonensis
  - †Sassia septemdentata
- †Saxolucina
  - †Saxolucina gaufia
- Scalina
  - †Scalina rubricollis
  - †Scalina trapaquara
  - †Scalina trigintanaria
- Scaphander
  - †Scaphander hilgardi – type locality for species
  - †Scaphander jacksonensis
  - †Scaphander primus
- Scapharca
  - †Scapharca chordicosta – type locality for species
  - †Scapharca delicatula
  - †Scapharca invidiosa
- Scaphella – or unidentified comparable form
- †Schizaropsis
  - †Schizaropsis convexus
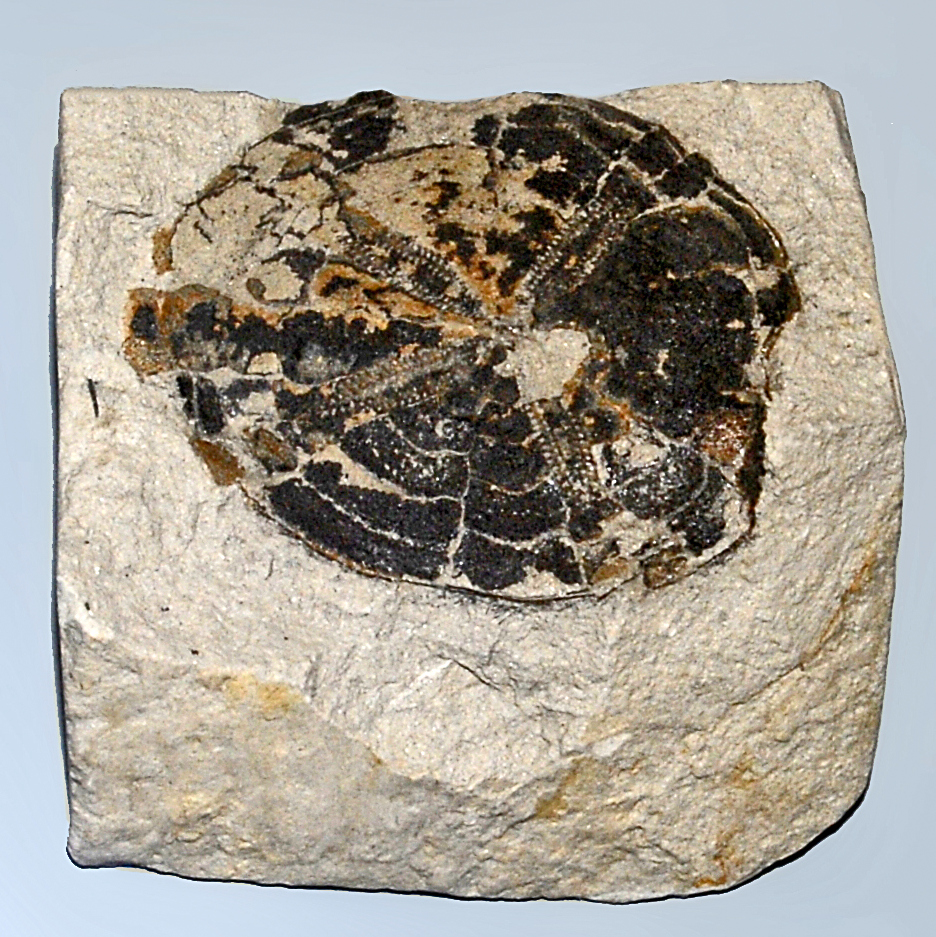
- Fossil of the Paleocene-recent heart urchin Schizaster
  Schizaster
  - †Schizaster americanus
  - †Schizaster armiger
- Schizomavella
  - †Schizomavella longirostris – type locality for species
- †Schizopodrella
  - †Schizopodrella viminea
- †Schizorthosecos
  - †Schizorthosecos grandiporosus
  - †Schizorthosecos interstitea
  - †Schizorthosecos interstitia
- †Schyliorhinus
  - †Schyliorhinus enniskilleni
- Scobinella
  - †Scobinella caelata
  - †Scobinella famelica
  - †Scobinella ferrosilica
  - †Scobinella hammettensis
  - †Scobinella jacksonensis
  - †Scobinella louisianae
  - †Scobinella macer
  - †Scobinella newtonensis
  - †Scobinella pluriplicata
  - †Scobinella reticulatoides
- Sconsia
  - †Sconsia lintea
  - †Sconsia prelintea – type locality for species
- Scrupocellaria
  - †Scrupocellaria clausa
  - †Scrupocellaria cookei
  - †Scrupocellaria williardi
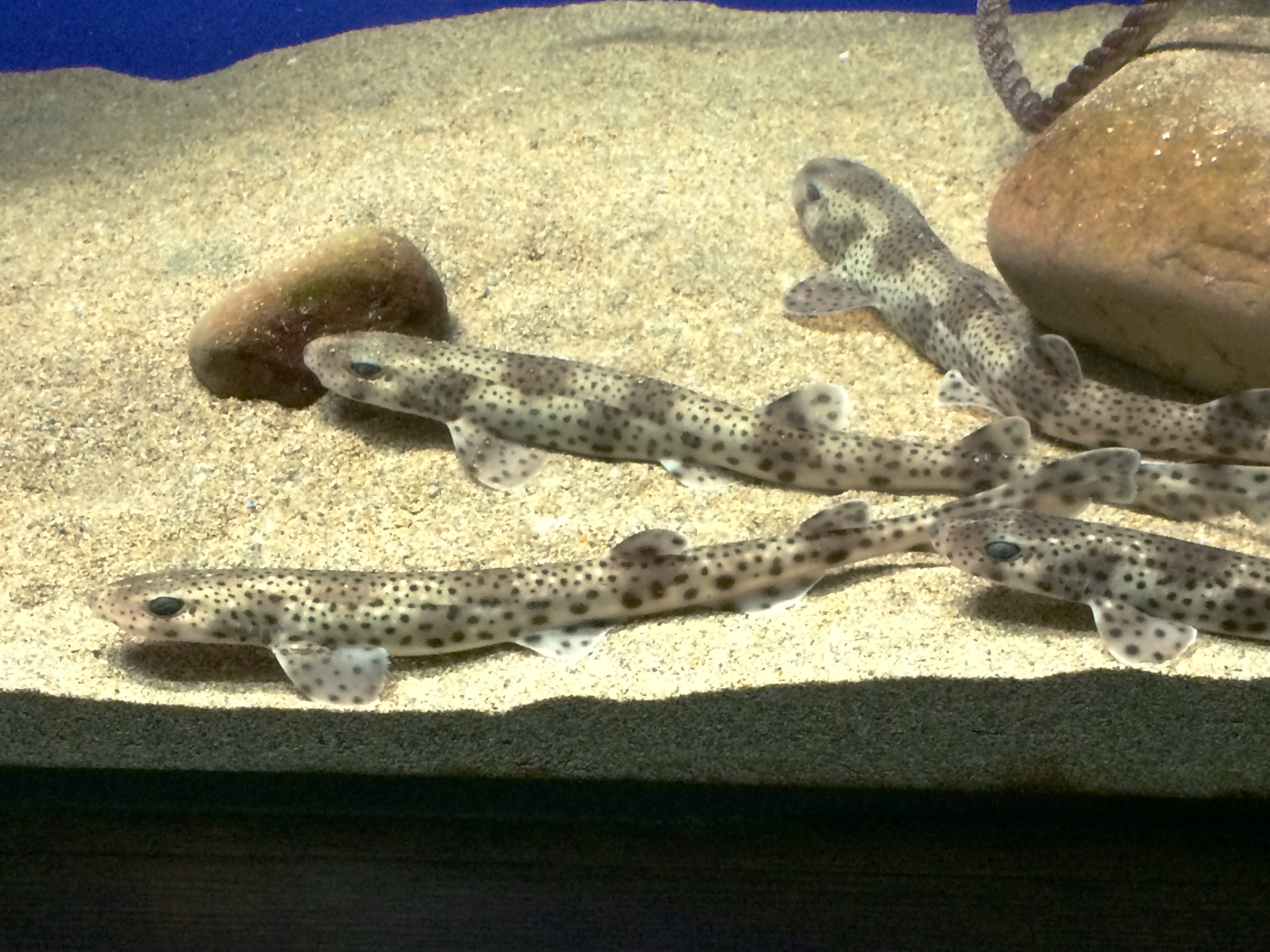
- Group of living Scyliorhinus catsharks
  Scyliorhinus
  - †Scyliorhinus gilberti
- Seila
  - †Seila constricta
  - †Seila quadristriaris
- Semele
  - †Semele mississippiensis
  - †Semele staminea
- Semelina
  - †Semelina pilsbryi
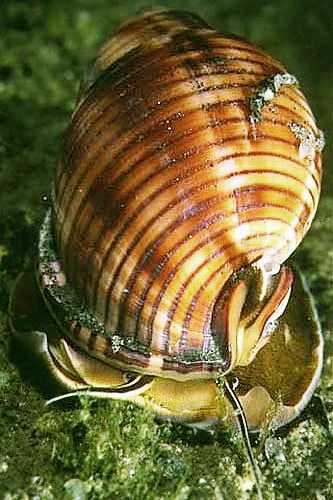
- A living Semicassis helmet sea snail
  Semicassis
  - †Semicassis caelatura
- Septifer
  - †Septifer probolus – type locality for species
- †Seraphs
- Serpulorbis
  - †Serpulorbis squamulosus
- Sigatica
  - †Sigatica boettgeri
  - †Sigatica clarkeana
  - †Sigatica conradii
- †Sinistrella
  - †Sinistrella americana
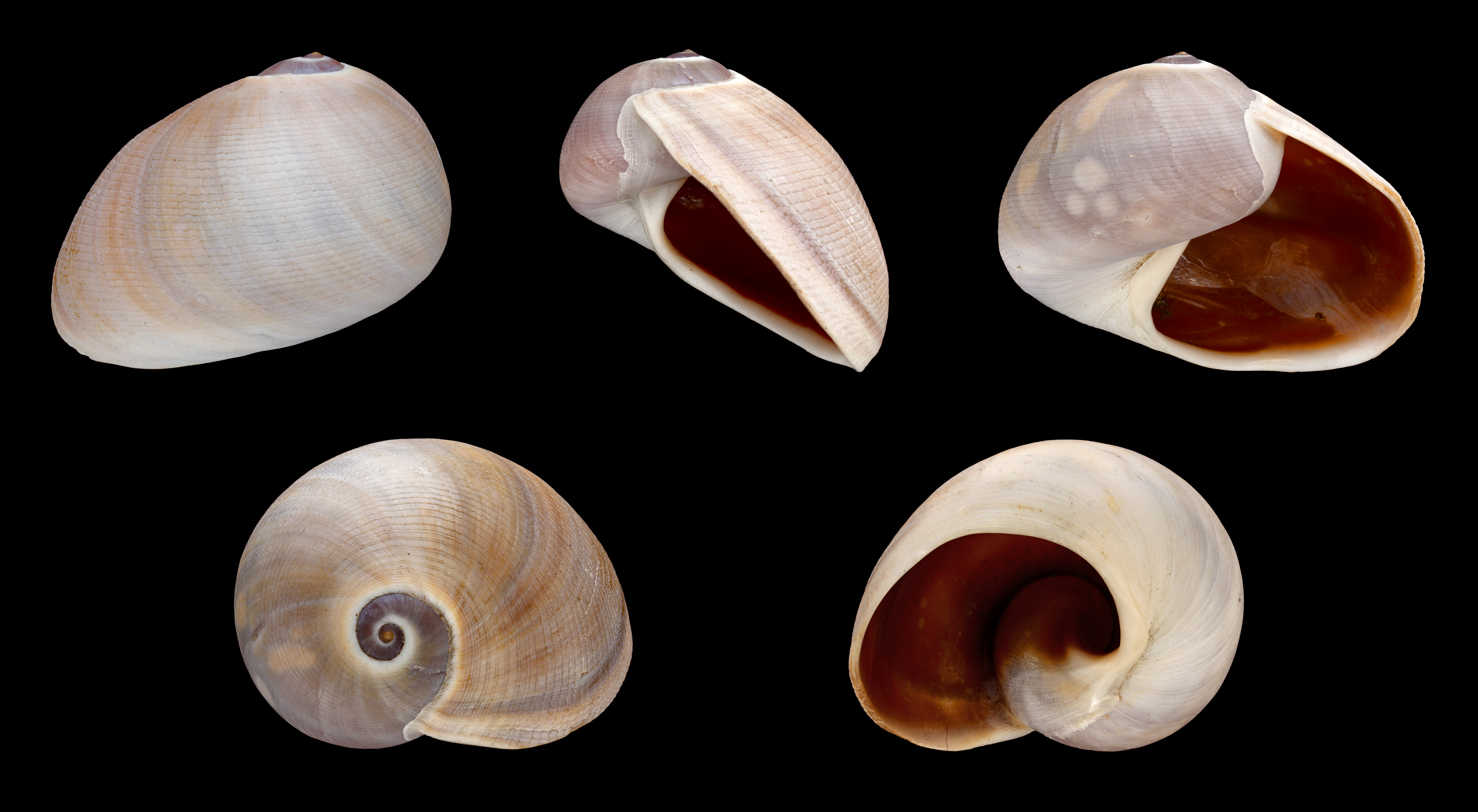
- Several views of the shell of a Sinum moon snail
  Sinum
  - †Sinum arctatum
  - †Sinum beatricae
  - †Sinum bilix
  - †Sinum danvillense – or unidentified comparable form
  - †Sinum declive
  - †Sinum inconstans
  - †Sinum jacksonense – type locality for species
  - †Sinum mississippiensis
- †Siphomia
  - †Siphomia claibornensis
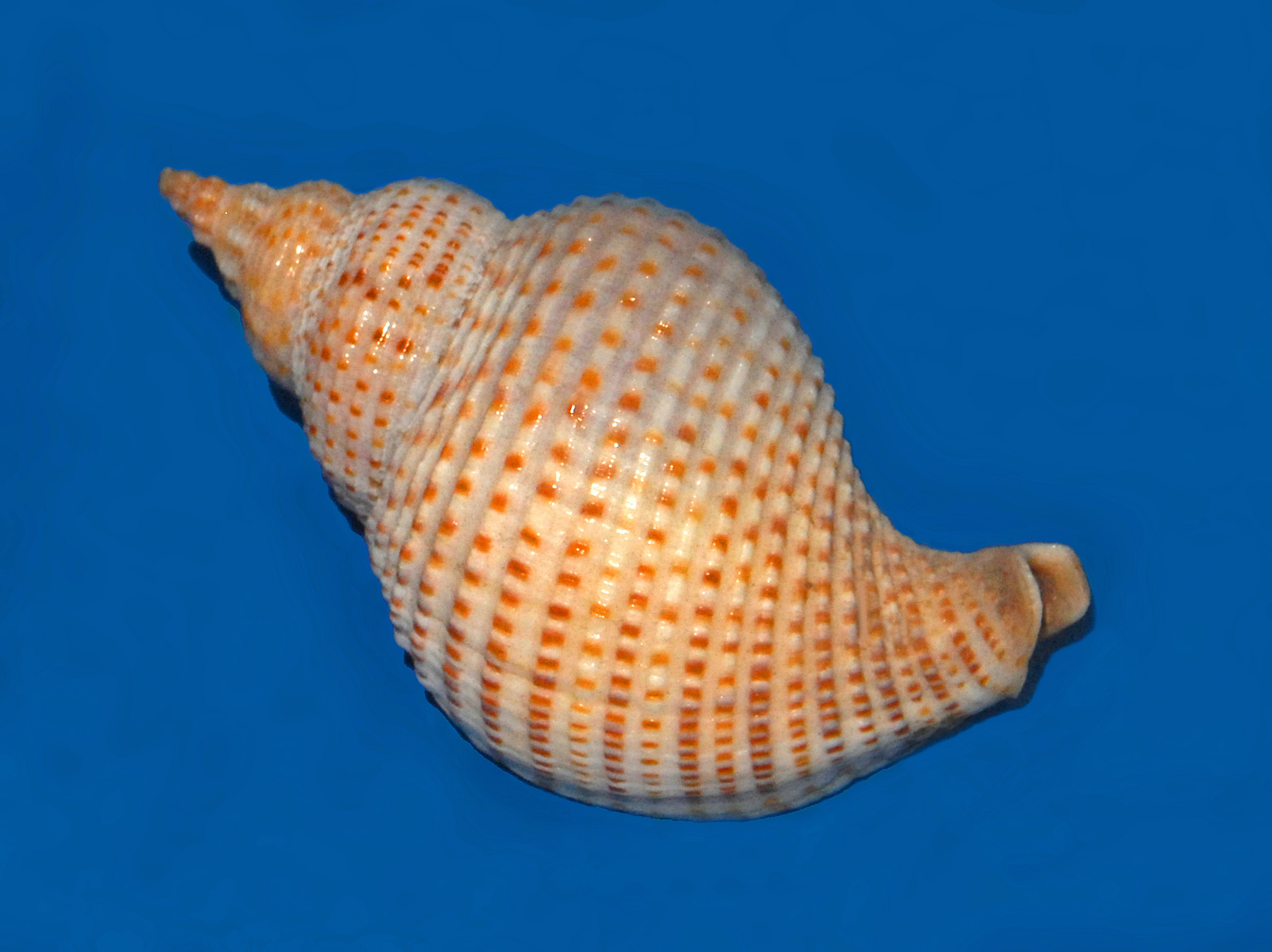
- Shell of the whelk sea snail Siphonalia
  Siphonalia
  - †Siphonalia jacksonia
  - †Siphonalia newtonensis
  - †Siphonalia sullivani
- Siphonochelus
  - †Siphonochelus curvirostratus
  - †Siphonochelus gracilis
- Skena
  - †Skena pignus
- Smittina
  - †Smittina angulata
  - †Smittina denticulifera
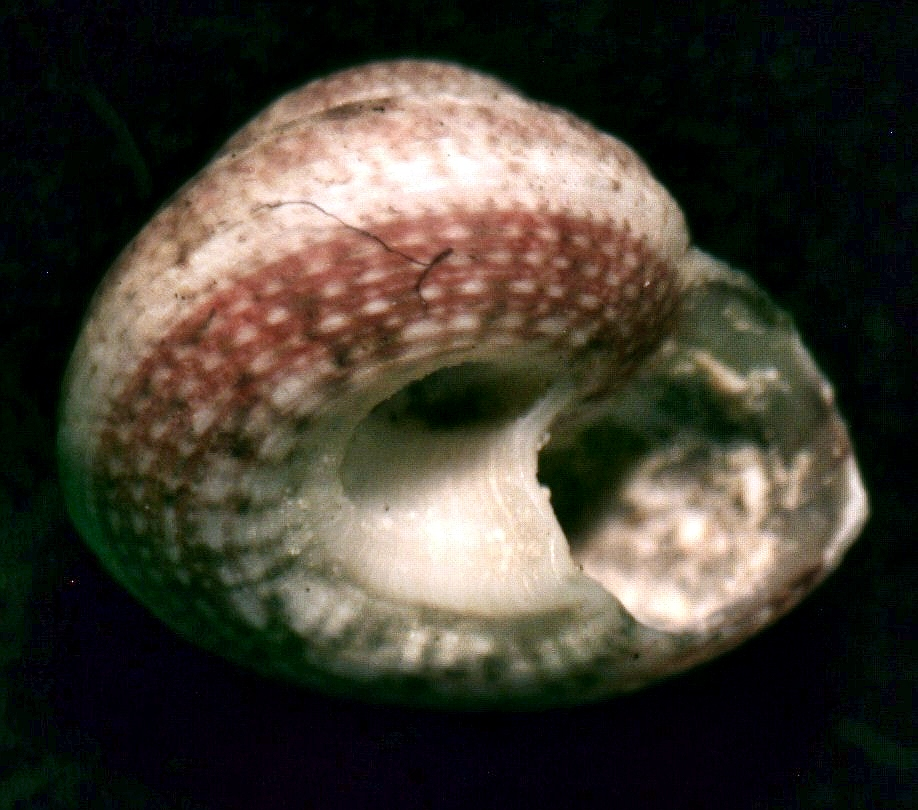
- Shell of a Solariella top sea snail
  Solariella
  - †Solariella cancellata
  - †Solariella louisiana
  - †Solariella menthafontis – type locality for species
  - †Solariella stalagmium
  - †Solariella sylvaerupis
  - †Solariella tallahalaensis – type locality for species
  - †Solariella tricostata
- Solariorbis
  - †Solariorbis quadrangularis
  - †Solariorbis subangulatus
- †Solariorbus
  - †Solariorbus subangulatus
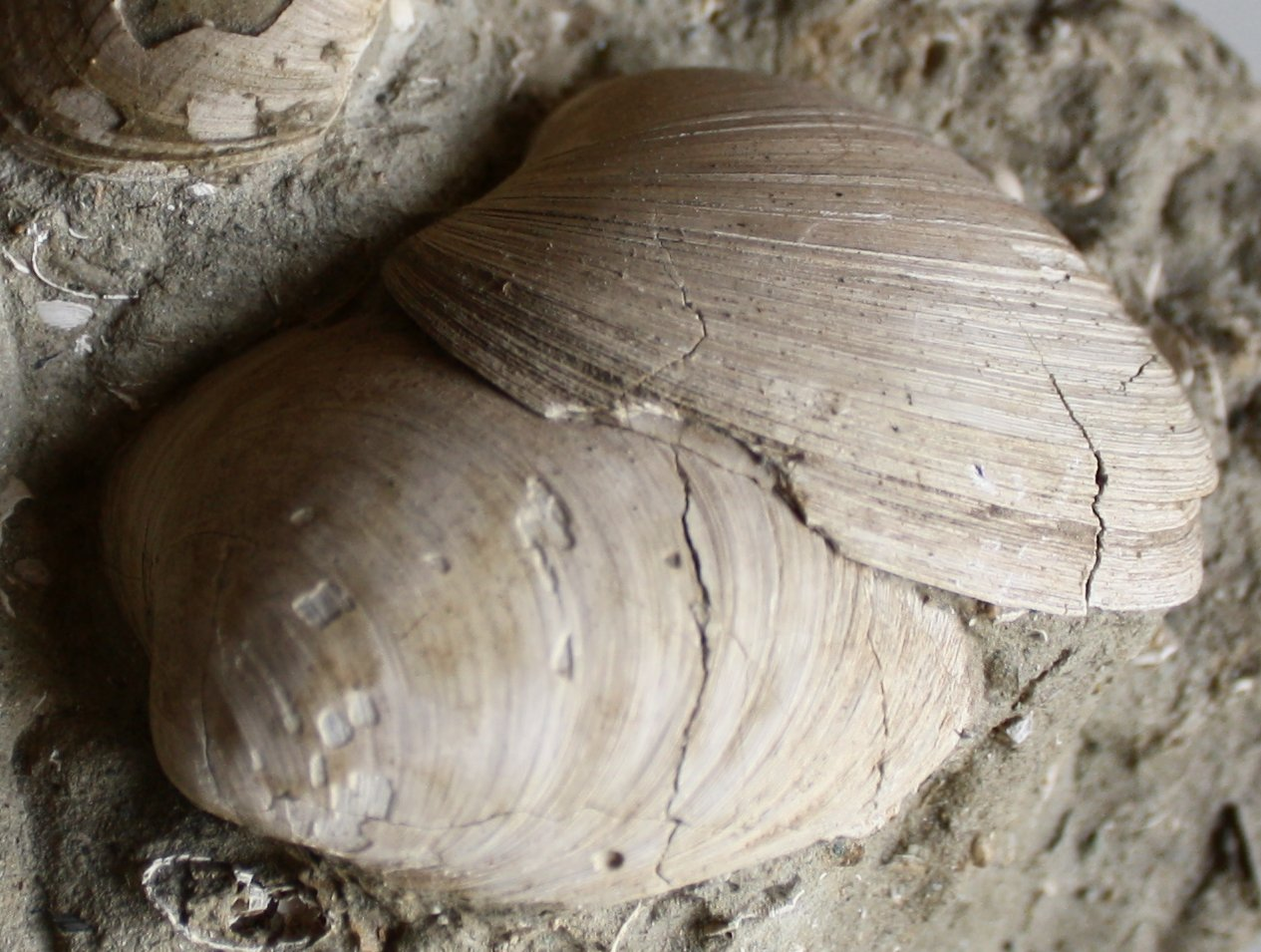
- Fossilized shells of the marine bivalve Solecurtus
  Solecurtus
  - †Solecurtus vicksburgensis
- Solena
  - †Solena abruptus
  - †Solena lisbonensis
- †Sphaerocypraea
  - †Sphaerocypraea jacksonensis – type locality for species
- Spheniopsis
  - †Spheniopsis mississippiensis
- †Sphraena
  - †Sphraena major – or unidentified comparable form
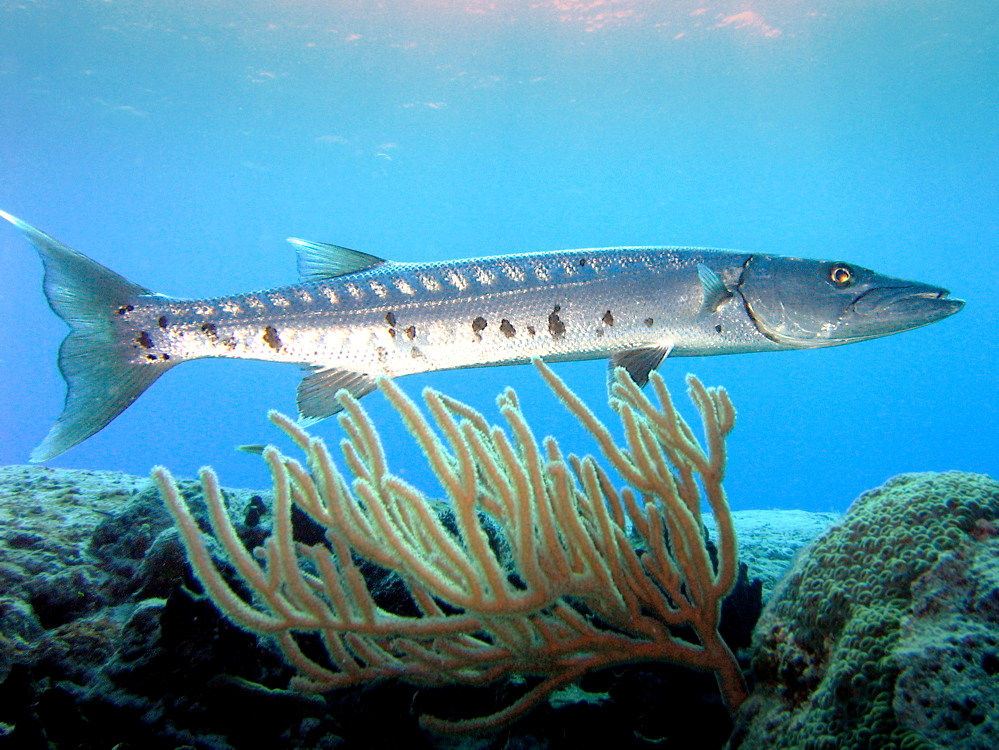
- A living Sphyraena, or barracuda
  Sphyraena – tentative report
- †Spiradaphne
  - †Spiradaphne lowei
- Spisula
  - †Spisula funerata
  - †Spisula inaequilateralis
  - †Spisula jacksonensis
  - †Spisula mississippiensis
  - †Spisula parilis
  - †Spisula praetanius
  - †Spisula praetenuis
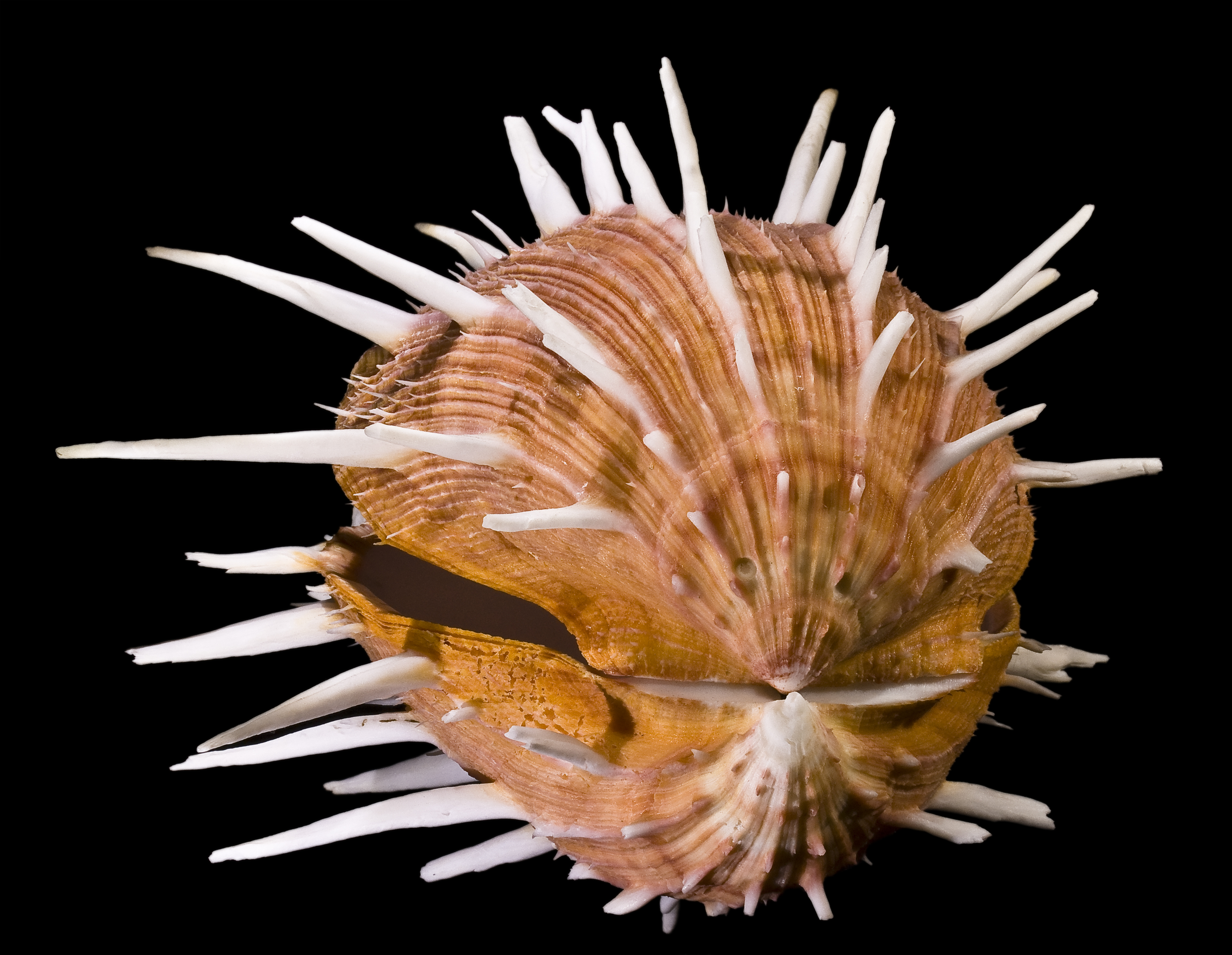
- Shell of a Spondylus, or spiny oyster
  Spondylus
  - †Spondylus dumosus
  - †Spondylus filiaris
- Sportella
  - †Sportella oblonga
- †Stamenocella
  - †Stamenocella anatina
  - †Stamenocella grandis
  - †Stamenocella inferaviculifera
  - †Stamenocella pyriforme
- †Steganoporella
  - †Steganoporella jacksonica
  - †Steganoporella rectangularia
- Sthenorytis
  - †Sthenorytis witfieldi
- †Strepsidura
  - †Strepsidura heilprini
- †Streptochetus
  - †Streptochetus limulus
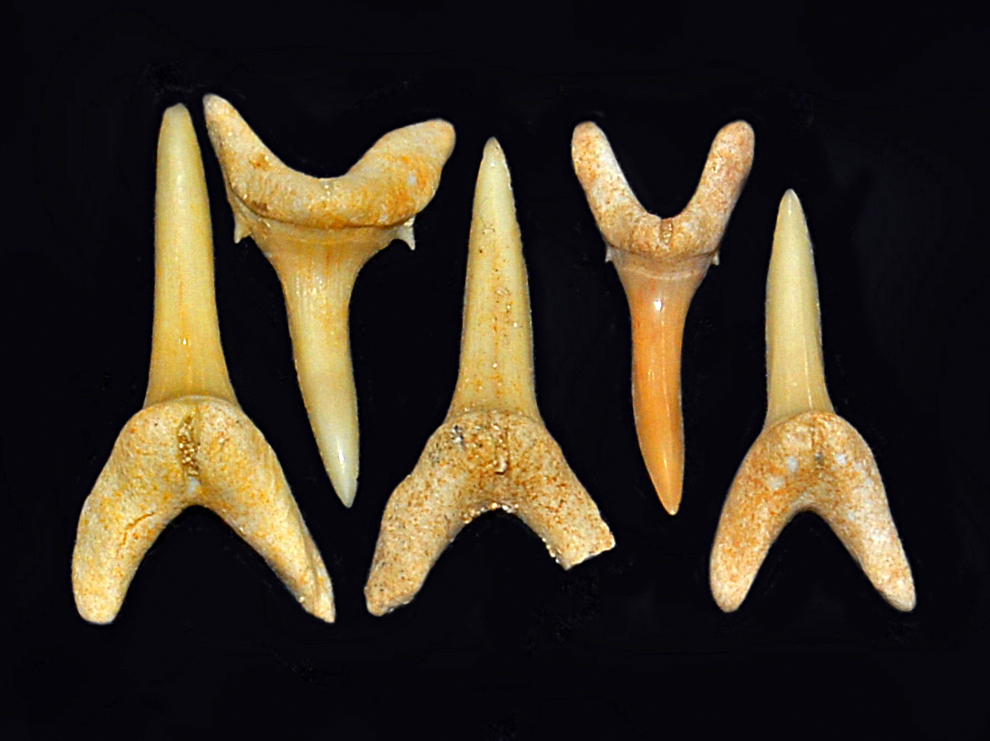
- Fossilized teeth of the Paleocene-Miocene sandshark Striatolamia
  †Striatolamia
  - †Striatolamia macrota
- Strioterebrum
  - †Strioterebrum tantula
- †Stromatopora
  - †Stromatopora parvipora
  - †Stromatopora polygonma
- Strombiformis
  - †Strombiformis caseyi
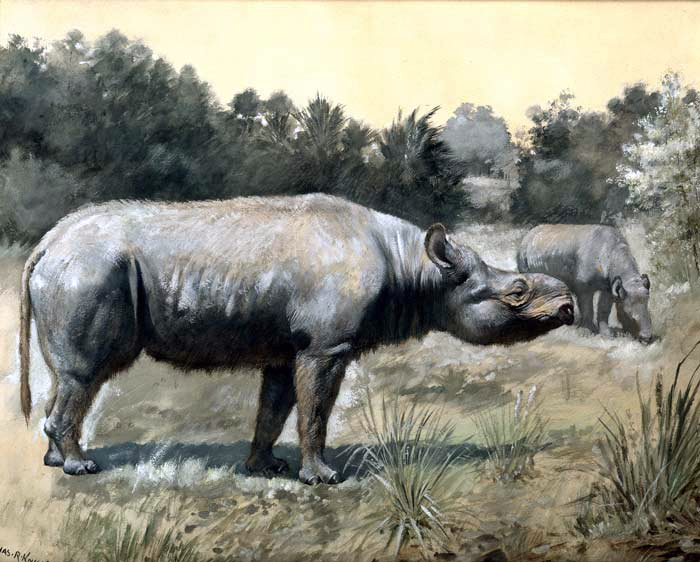
- Life restoration of the Eocene-Oligocene cow-sized rhinoceros Subhyracodon. Charles R. Knight (1890s).
  †Subhyracodon
  - †Subhyracodon occidentalis
- †Sulcocypraea
  - †Sulcocypraea healeyi
  - †Sulcocypraea kennedyi
  - †Sulcocypraea lintea
  - †Sulcocypraea vaughani
- †Sullivania
  - †Sullivania fisherensis
  - †Sullivania hicoricola
  - †Sullivania perexilis
- †Surculoma
  - †Surculoma falsabenes
  - †Surculoma kellogii
  - †Surculoma penrosei
  - †Surculoma subequalis
- Sveltella
  - †Sveltella parva
  - †Sveltella sotoensis
- Syntomodrillia
  - †Syntomodrillia collarubra – type locality for species
  - †Syntomodrillia funis – type locality for species
  - †Syntomodrillia tantula
- †Syphraena

== T ==
- †Talpavoides
  - †Talpavoides dartoni
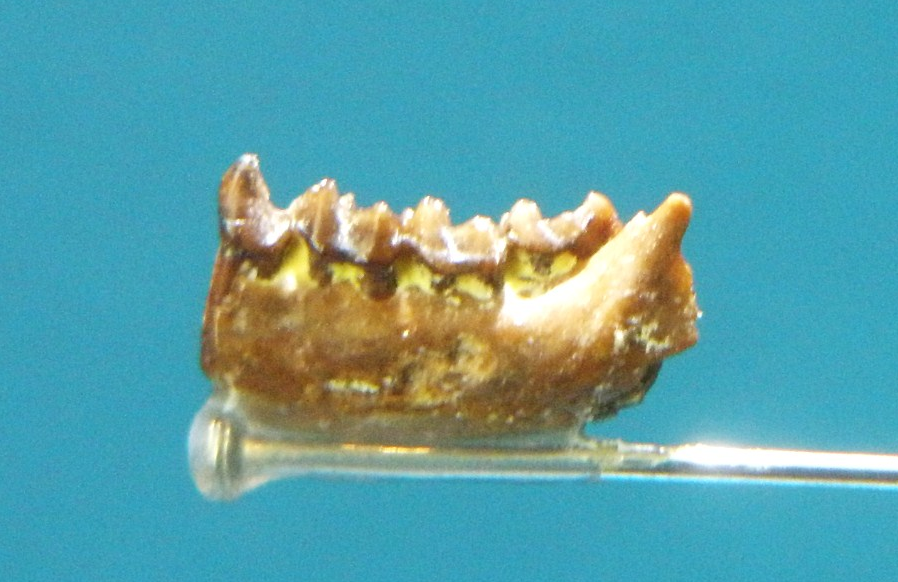
- Fossilized mandible of the Eocene primate Teilhardina
  †Teilhardina
  - †Teilhardina magnoliana
- Teinostoma
  - †Teinostoma caseyi
  - †Teinostoma minuta – type locality for species
  - †Teinostoma moodiense
  - †Teinostoma neodiensa
  - †Teinostoma verrilli
- Tellidorella
  - †Tellidorella interlacinia – type locality for species
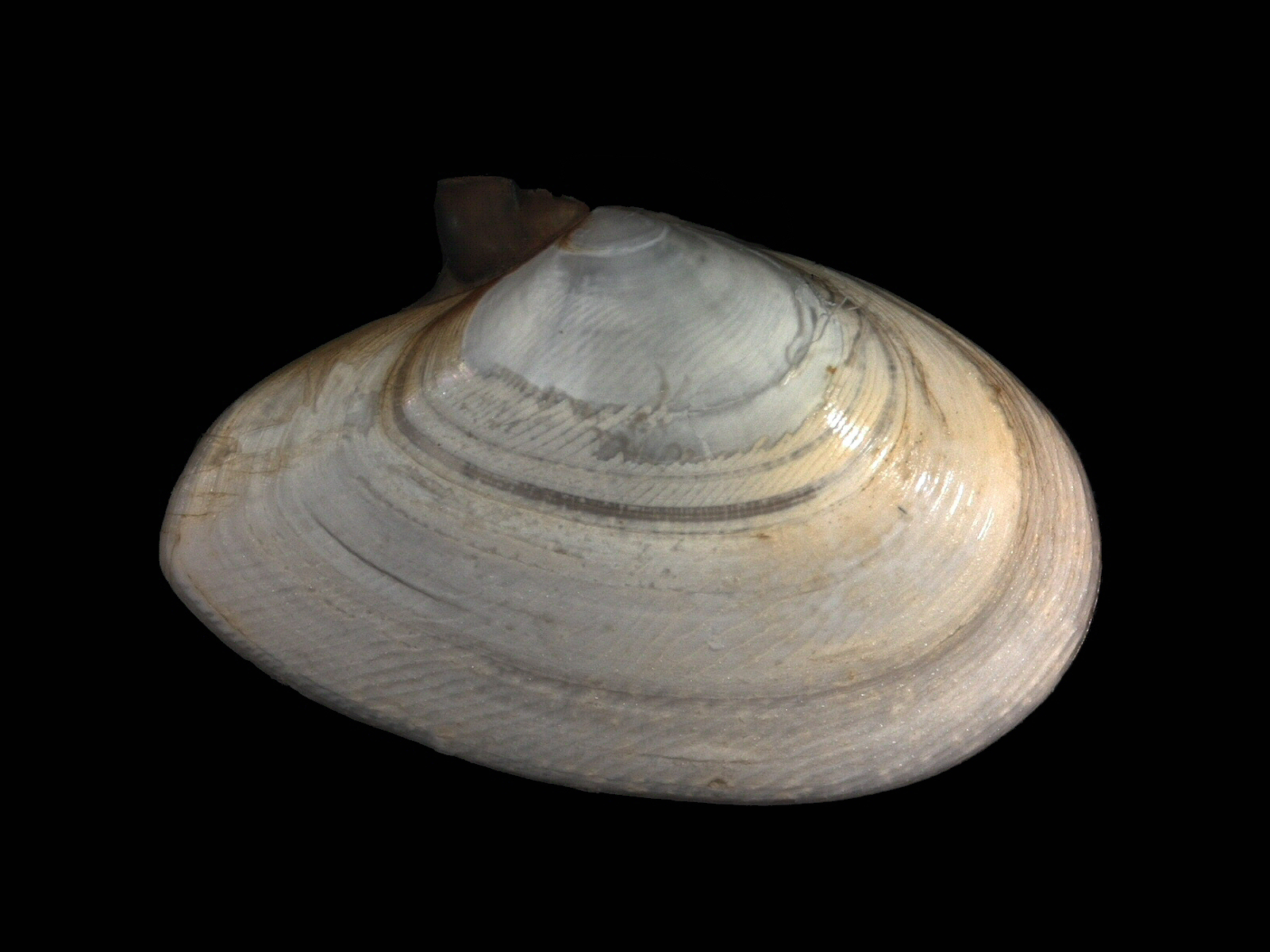
- Shell of a Tellina, or tellin
  Tellina
  - †Tellina linifera
  - †Tellina lintea
  - †Tellina pearlensis
  - †Tellina petropolitana
  - †Tellina serica
  - †Tellina subprotexta – type locality for species
  - †Tellina subtriangularis
  - †Tellina vicksburgensis
- Tenagodus
  - †Tenagodus vitis
- †Tenegodus
  - †Tenegodus vitis
- Tenuiscala
  - †Tenuiscala aspersa
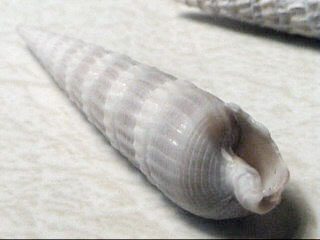
- Shell of a Terebra augur sea snail
  Terebra
  - †Terebra divisura
  - †Terebra hiwanneensis – type locality for species
  - †Terebra jacksonensis
  - †Terebra tantula
  - †Terebra texagyra
- †Terebrifusus
  - †Terebrifusus multiplicatus
- Teredo
  - †Teredo mississippiensis
- Terrapene
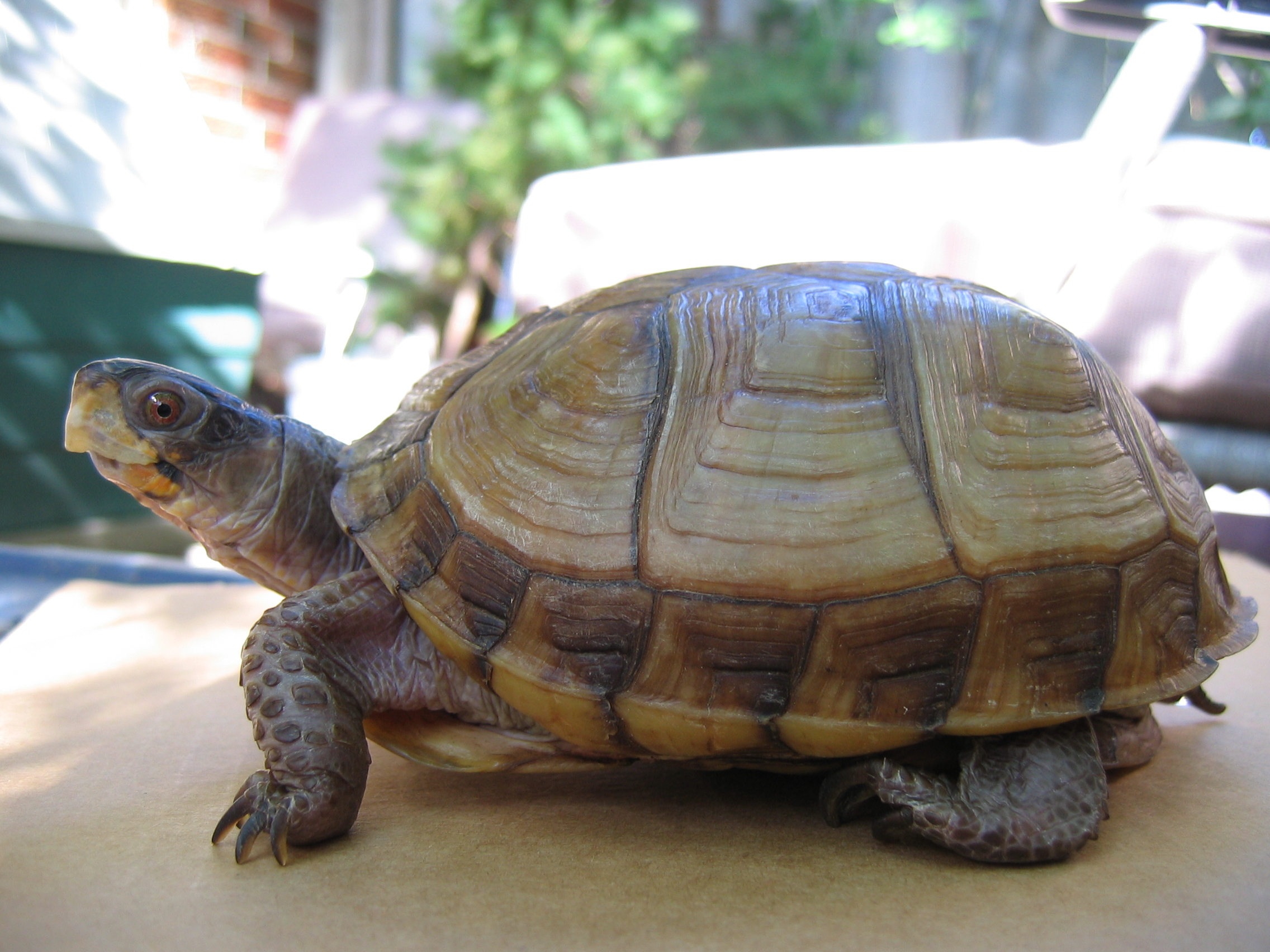
  - A living Terrapene carolina, or common box turtle
    †Terrapene carolina
- †Terrebrifusus
  - †Terrebrifusus amoenus
- †Testallium
  - †Testallium vetustum
- Thracia
  - †Thracia vicksburgensis
  - †Thracia vicksburgiana
- †Tiburnus
  - †Tiburnus eboreus
- †Tiza
  - †Tiza alta
- †Tornatellaea
  - †Tornatellaea bella
  - †Tornatellaea lata
- Tornus
  - †Tornus infraplicatus
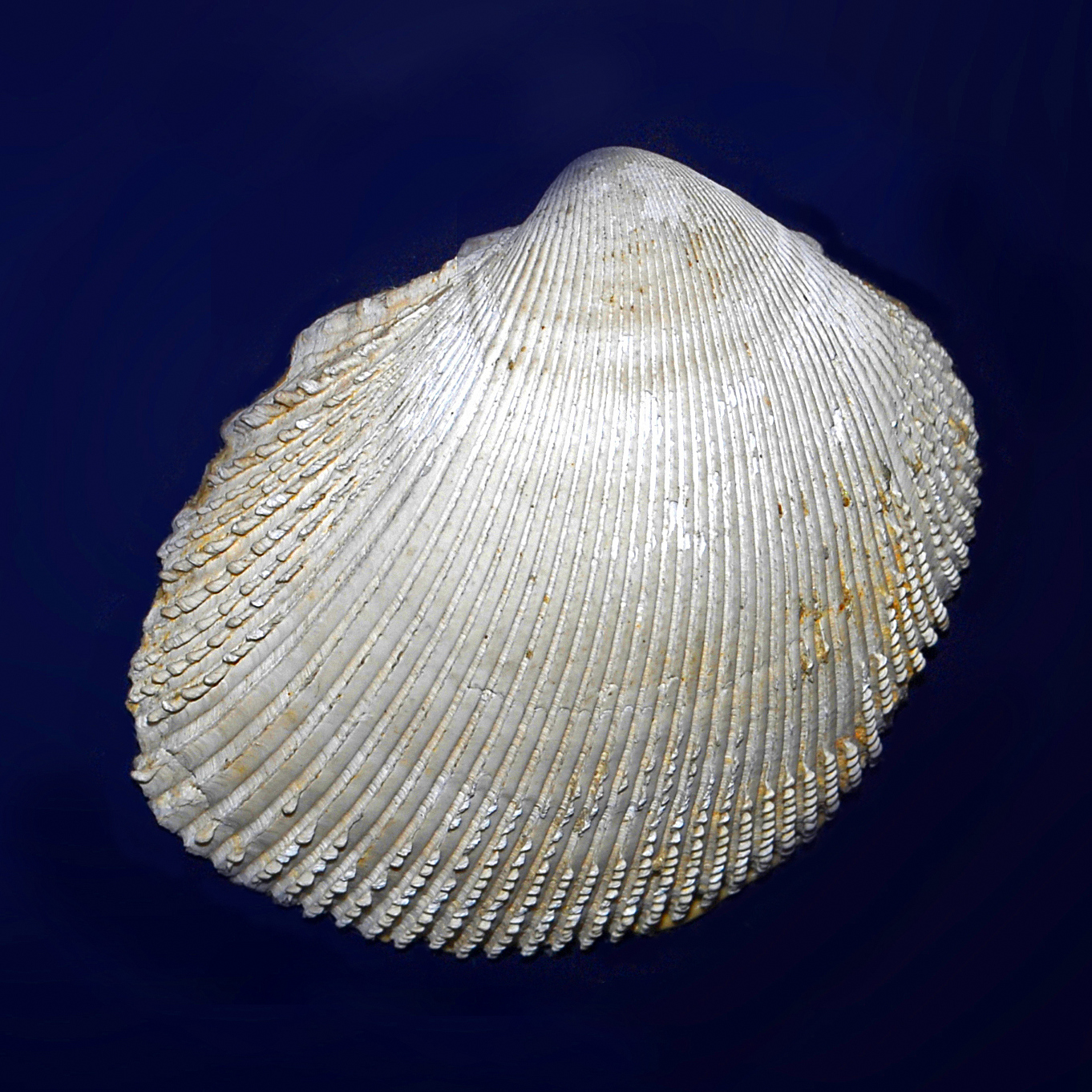
- Fossilized shell of a Trachycardium cockle
  Trachycardium
  - †Trachycardium eversum
  - †Trachycardium planicostata – type locality for species
- †Transovula
  - †Transovula symmetrica
- †Tretocycloecia
  - †Tretocycloecia grandis
- Trigonopora
  - †Trigonopora grande
- Trigonostoma
  - †Trigonostoma aurorae – tentative report
  - †Trigonostoma babylonicum
  - †Trigonostoma gemmatum
  - †Trigonostoma panones
- Trigonulina
  - †Trigonulina sotoensis
- †Trinacria
  - †Trinacria menthifontis – type locality for species
- Triphora
  - †Triphora bilineata
  - †Triphora major
  - †Triphora meridionalis
- †Tritaria
  - †Tritaria falsus
  - †Tritaria macilenta
- †Tritonatractus
  - †Tritonatractus montgomeriensis
  - †Tritonatractus pearlensis
- Trochita
  - †Trochita aperta
- Trochocyathus
  - †Trochocyathus depressus – type locality for species
- †Tropisurcula
  - †Tropisurcula caseyi
  - †Tropisurcula crenula – tentative report
- †Trygon
  - †Trygon jaekeli
- †Trypanotoma
  - †Trypanotoma longispira
  - †Trypanotoma terebriformis
- Trypostega
  - †Trypostega venusta
- Tubiola
  - †Tubiola nautiloides
- Tudicla – or unidentified comparable form
- †Turbinolia
  - †Turbinolia dickersoni – type locality for species
  - †Turbinolia insignifica – type locality for species
  - †Turbinolia pharetra
  - †Turbinolia vicksburgensis – type locality for species
  - †Turbinolia wautubbeensis – type locality for species
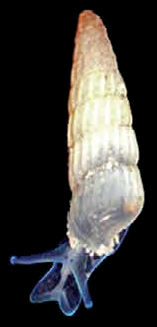
- A living Turbonilla parasitic pyram sea snail
  Turbonilla
  - †Turbonilla leafensis – type locality for species
  - †Turbonilla major
  - †Turbonilla mississippiensis
- Turricula
  - †Turricula byramensis – type locality for species
  - †Turricula longiforma
  - †Turricula plenta
  - †Turricula plutonica
- Turris – report made of unidentified related form or using admittedly obsolete nomenclature
  - †Turris exsculpata
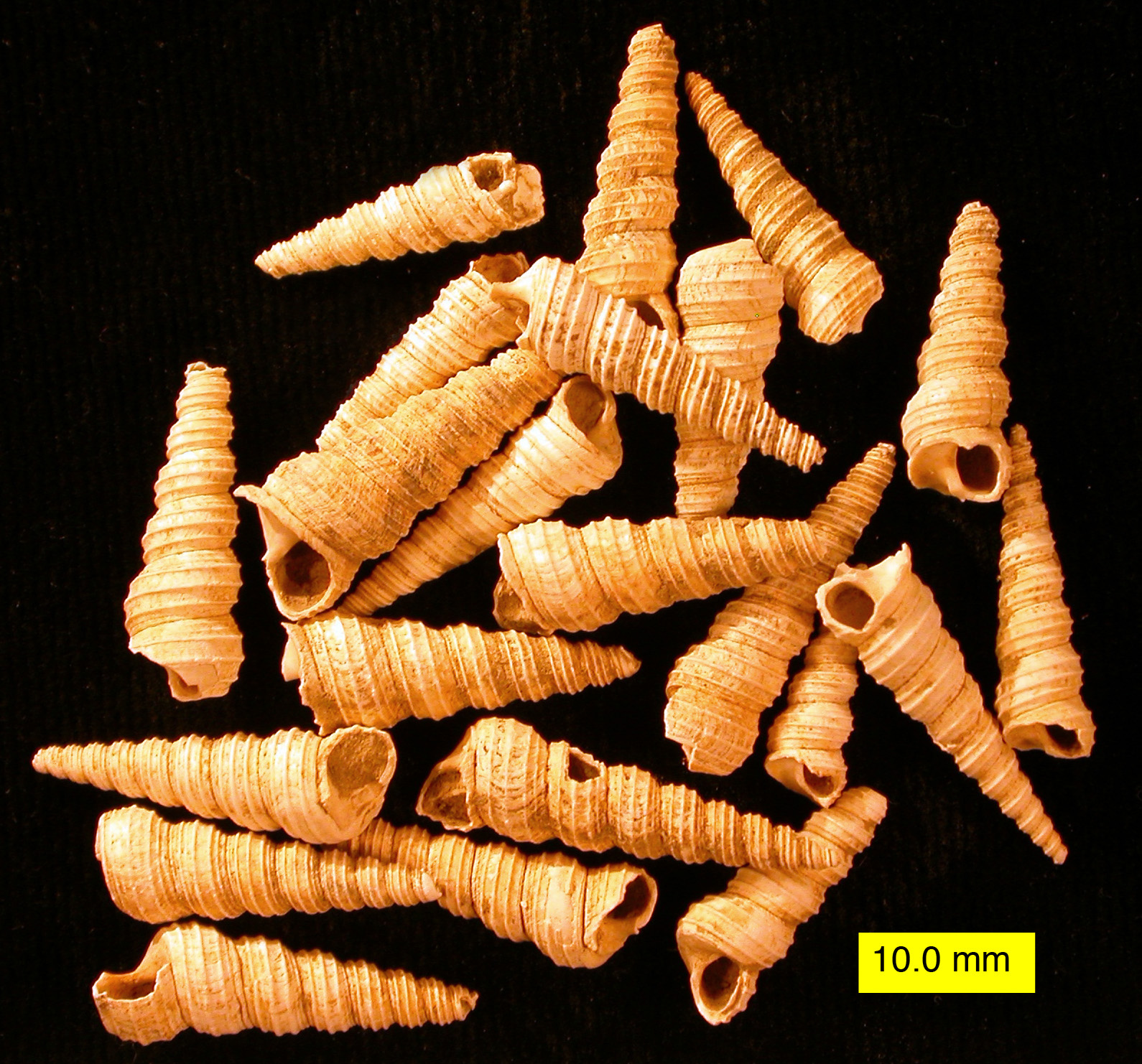
- Fossilized shells of the Late Jurassic-modern tower snail Turritella
  Turritella
  - †Turritella boycensis – type locality for species
  - †Turritella carota
  - †Turritella caseyi – type locality for species
  - †Turritella clevelandia
  - †Turritella dobyensis
  - †Turritella dutexata
  - †Turritella ghigna
  - †Turritella gilberti
  - †Turritella jacksonensis
  - †Turritella mississippiensis
  - †Turritella mundula – type locality for species
  - †Turritella nasuta
  - †Turritella planigyrata
  - †Turritella premimetes – or unidentified related form
  - †Turritella rubricollis – type locality for species
  - †Turritella saffordi
  - †Turritella tennesseensis
- †Tuscahomaophis – type locality for genus
  - †Tuscahomaophis leggetti – type locality for species
- †Tuscahomys
  - †Tuscahomys major
  - †Tuscahomys medius
  - †Tuscahomys minor
- Typhina
  - †Typhina mississippiensis – type locality for species
  - †Typhina palmerae
- Typhis
  - †Typhis dentatus

== U ==
- †Uintacyon
- Umbraculum
  - †Umbraculum planulatum
- †Unitas
  - †Unitas pearlensis
- Uromitra
  - †Uromitra grantensis
- Urosalpinx
  - †Urosalpinx aspinosus
- Ursus
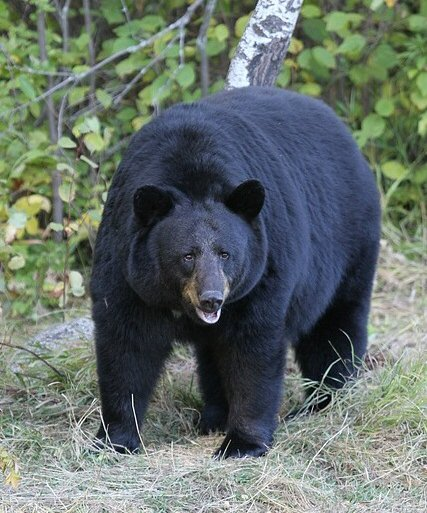
  - A living Ursus americanus, or American black bear
    †Ursus americanus

== V ==
- †Varicobela
  - †Varicobela aldrichi – type locality for species
  - †Varicobela smithii
- †Vassacyon
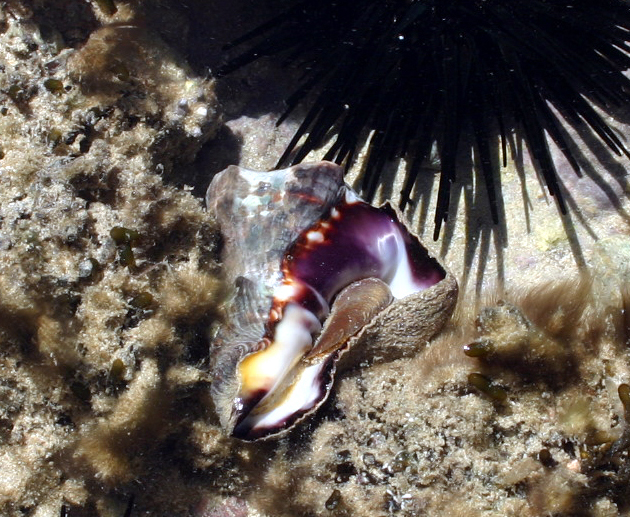
- A living Vasum, or vase sea snail
  Vasum
  - †Vasum humerosum
- Venericardia
  - †Venericardia apodensata
  - †Venericardia bashiplata
  - †Venericardia carsonensis
  - †Venericardia claiboplata
  - †Venericardia densata
  - †Venericardia diversidentata
  - †Venericardia francescae
  - †Venericardia hatcheplata
  - †Venericardia horatiana
  - †Venericardia klimacodes
  - †Venericardia mediaplata
  - †Venericardia nanaplata
  - †Venericardia planicosta
  - †Venericardia rotunda
- Venus – report made of unidentified related form or using admittedly obsolete nomenclature
  - †Venus jacksonensis
- Verticordia
  - †Verticordia cossmanni
  - †Verticordia dalliana
  - †Verticordia quadrangularis
  - †Verticordia sotoensis
- †Vetidrillia – type locality for genus
  - †Vetidrillia palmerae – type locality for species
- Vexillum (gastropod)
  - †Vexillum cellulifera
  - †Vexillum cervilirata – type locality for species
  - †Vexillum laevicostata – type locality for species
  - †Vexillum lintoidea
  - †Vexillum multiostata – type locality for species
  - †Vexillum tallahalaensis – type locality for species
- Vitrinella
  - †Vitrinella laevis
- †Viverravus
  - †Viverravus laytoni
- †Viverriscus – type locality for genus
  - †Viverriscus omnivorus – type locality for species
- †Vokesula
  - †Vokesula aldrichi
  - †Vokesula smithvillensis
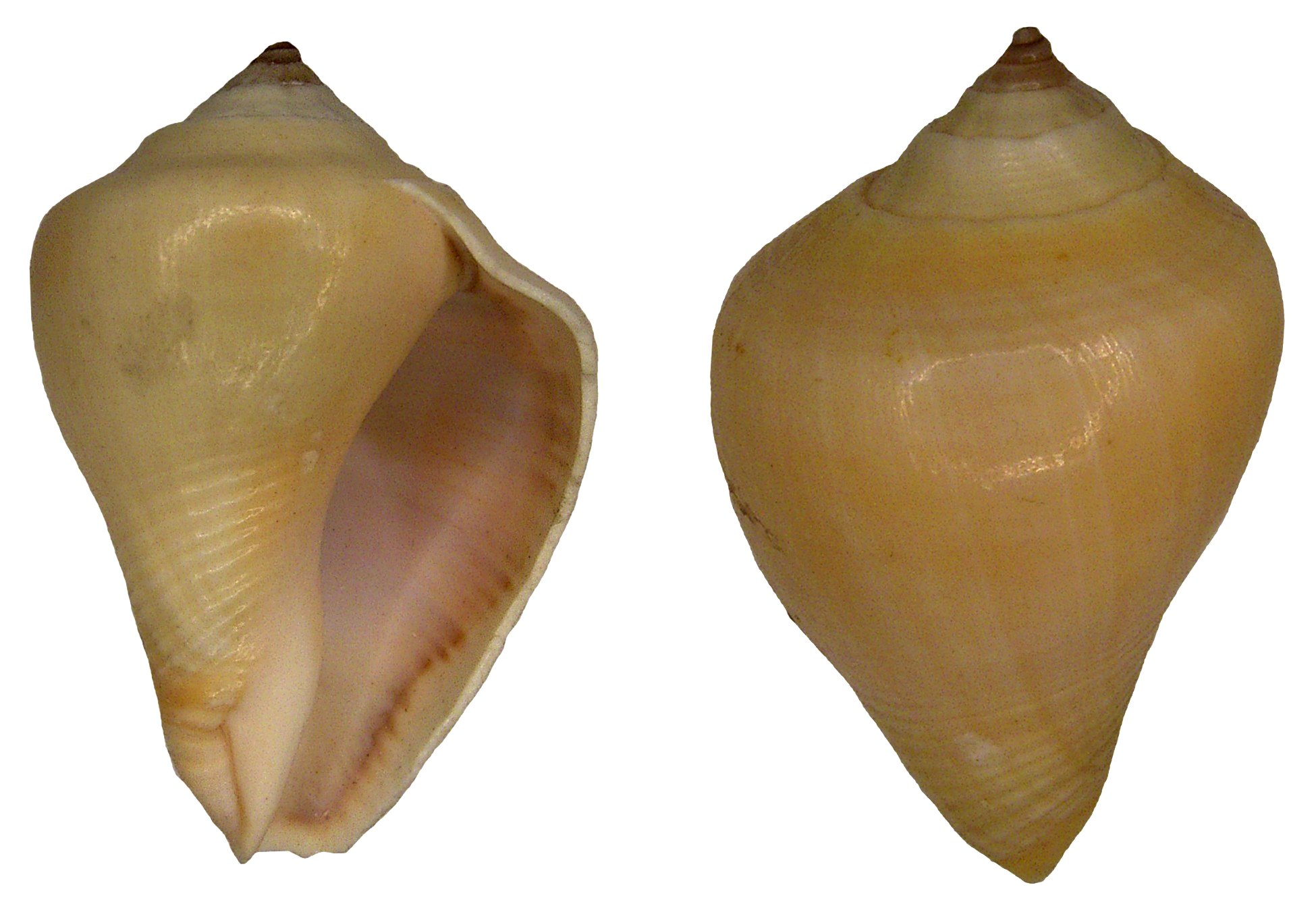
- Shell in multiple views of a Volema crown conch
  Volema
  - †Volema hopkinsi – type locality for species
- †Volvaria
  - †Volvaria reticulata
- Volvulella
  - †Volvulella subspinosa – type locality for species

== W ==
- †Wyonycteris
  - †Wyonycteris primitivus – type locality for species

== X ==
- Xancus
  - †Xancus wilsoni
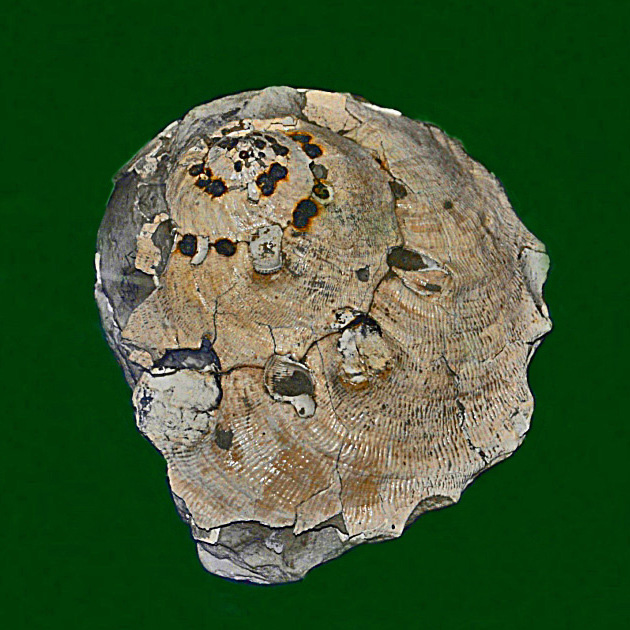
- Fossilized shell of the Late Cretaceous-modern carrier shell sea snail Xenophora
  Xenophora
  - †Xenophora conica
  - †Xenophora humilis
  - †Xenophora reclusa
- †Xiphiorhynchus
  - †Xiphiorhynchus eocaenicus – or unidentified comparable form
- Xylophaga – tentative report
  - †Xylophaga mississippiensis

== Y ==
- Yoldia
  - †Yoldia clydoniona – type locality for species
  - †Yoldia mater
  - †Yoldia serica

== Z ==
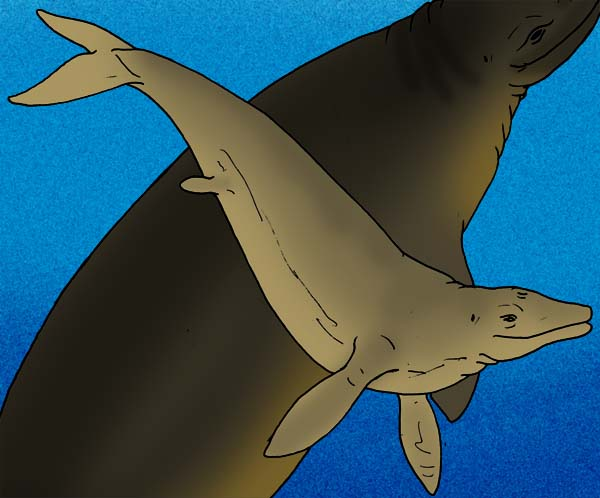
- Life restoration of the Eocene whale Zygorhiza
  †Zygorhiza
  - †Zygorhiza kochii
