= List of the prehistoric life of Mississippi =

This list of the prehistoric life of Mississippi contains the various prehistoric life-forms whose fossilized remains have been reported from within the US state of Mississippi.

== Precambrian-Paleozoic ==
The Paleobiology Database records no known occurrences of Precambrian or Paleozoic fossils in Mississippi.

== Mesozoic ==
- Acesta
- Acirsa
- Acmaea
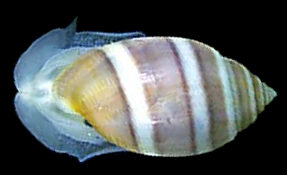
- A living Acteon barrel bubble sea snail
  †Acteon
- †Aenona
- †Agerostrea
- Alvania
- †Ampullina
- Anatina
- †Ancilla
- †Anomia
- †Anomoeodus
- †Arca
- Architectonica
- Arrhoges
- Astarte
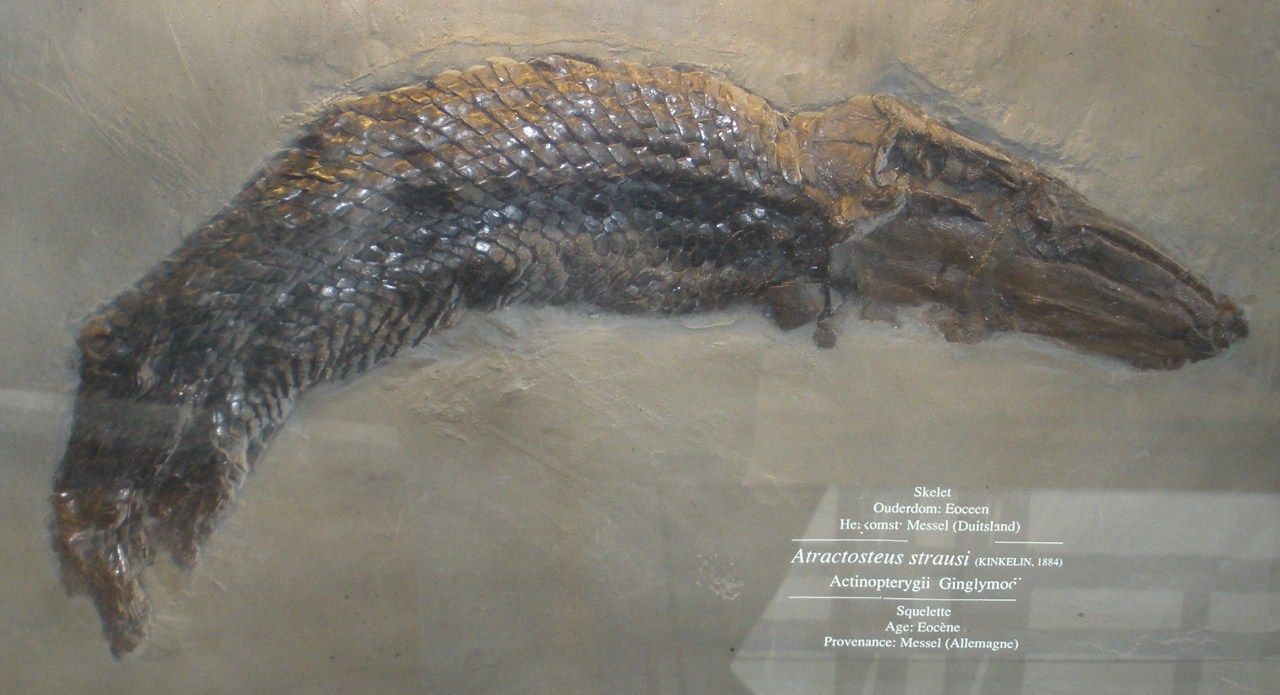
- Fossilized skeleton of the gar Atractosteus
  Atractosteus
- †Baculites
  - †Baculites arculus
  - †Baculites capensis
  - †Baculites grandis – or unidentified comparable form
  - †Baculites tippahensis
- Barbatia
- †Belemnitella
  - †Belemnitella americana
- Bernaya
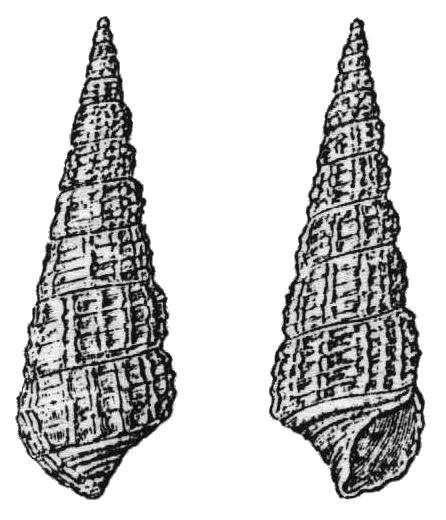
- Illustration of the shell in multiple views of a Bittium cerith sea snail
  Bittium – tentative report
- Botula
  - †Botula carolinensis
  - †Botula ripleyana
- Brachidontes
- Bulla – tentative report
- Cadulus
- Caestocorbula
  - †Caestocorbula crassaplica
  - †Caestocorbula crassiplica
  - †Caestocorbula suffalciata
  - †Caestocorbula terramaria
- †Calliomphalus
  - †Calliomphalus americanus
  - †Calliomphalus nudus
- Calyptraea
- Cantharus
- Capulus
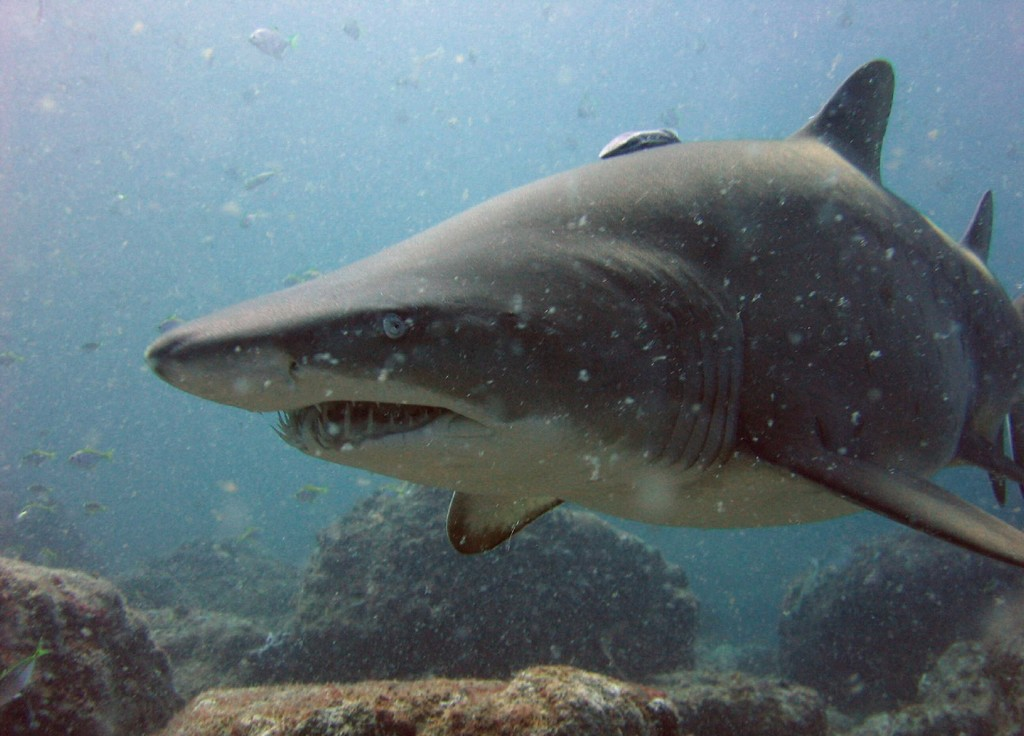
- A living Carcharias sand tiger shark
  Carcharias – tentative report
- Caryophyllia
- †Catopygus
- †Caveola
- Ceratia
- Cerithiella
  - †Cerithiella nodoliratum
  - †Cerithiella semirugatum
- Cerithium
- Chlamys
- †Chondrites
- Cidaris
- Clavagella
- Cliona
- Corbula
- Crenella
  - †Crenella elegantula
  - †Crenella serica
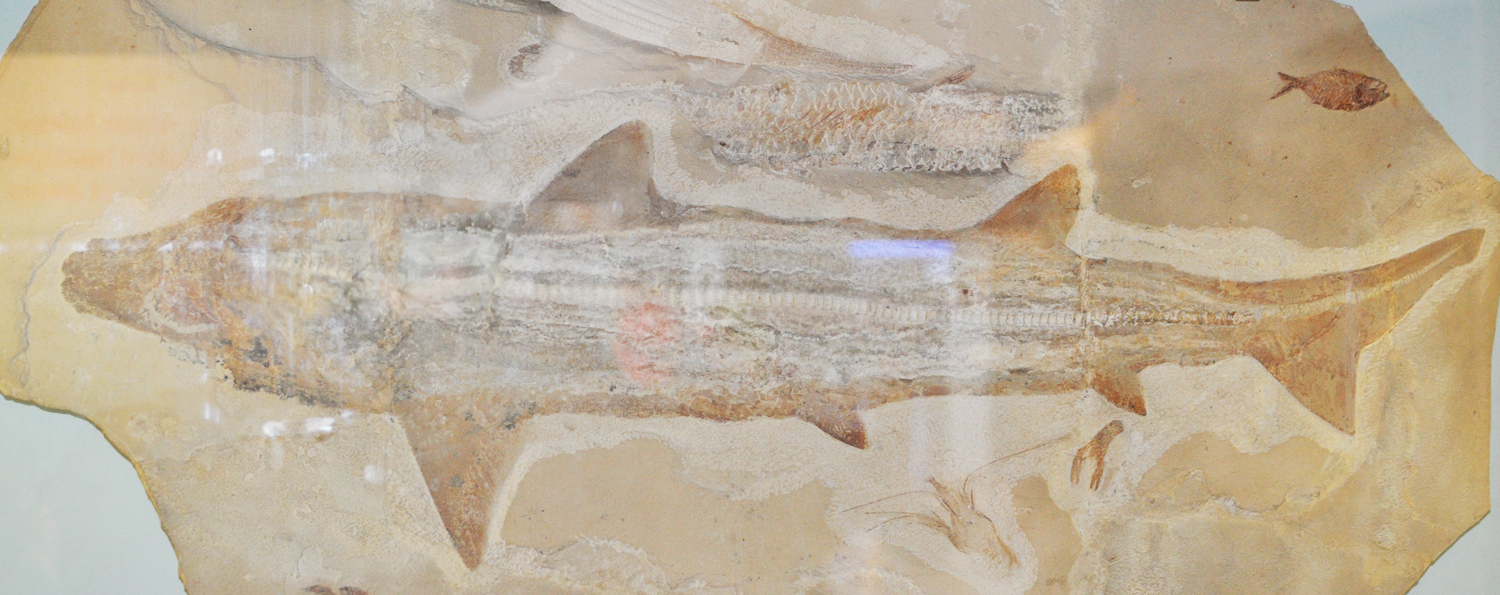
- Fossil of the Early Cretaceous-Eocene shark Cretolamna
  †Cretolamna
  - †Cretolamna appendiculata
- Crucibulum
- Cucullaea
  - †Cucullaea capax
  - †Cucullaea littlei
- Cuspidaria
  - †Cuspidaria grandis
  - †Cuspidaria jerseyensis – or unidentified comparable form
- Cylichna
  - †Cylichna diversilirata
  - †Cylichna incisa
- †Cymella
- Dasmosmilia
  - †Dasmosmilia kochii
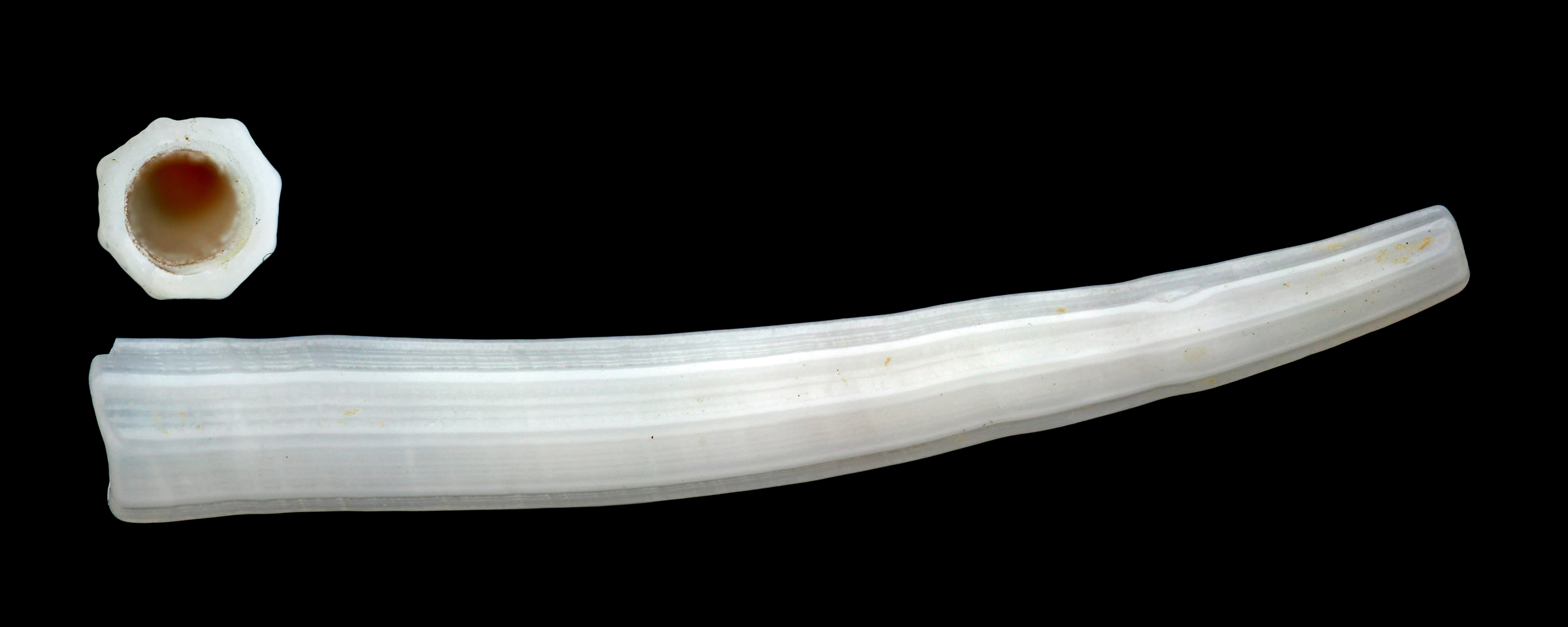
- Shell of a Dentalium tusk shell
  †Dentalium
  - †Dentalium leve
- Dimya
- †Discoscaphites
  - †Discoscaphites conradi
  - †Discoscaphites iris
- †Dolicholatirus
- †Ecphora
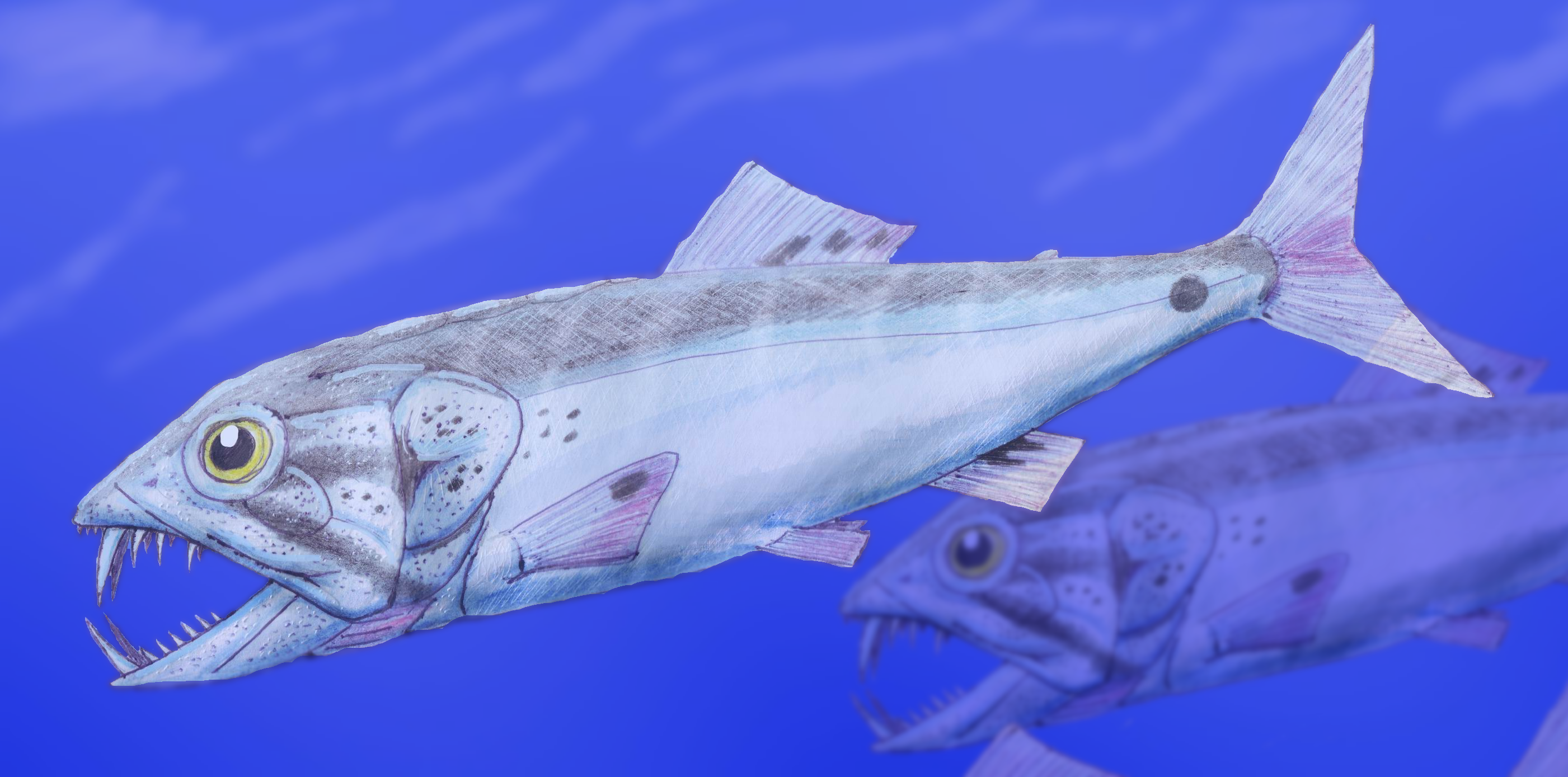
- Restoration of the Early Cretaceous-Eocene bony fish Enchodus, or the "saber-toothed herring"
  †Enchodus
  - †Enchodus petrosus
- †Eothoracosaurus – type locality for genus
  - †Eothoracosaurus mississippiensis – type locality for species
- †Epitonium
  - †Epitonium sillimani
- †Eryma – report made of unidentified related form or using admittedly obsolete nomenclature
- †Eulima
  - †Eulima gracilistylis
  - †Eulima monmouthensis
- †Euspira
- †Eutrephoceras
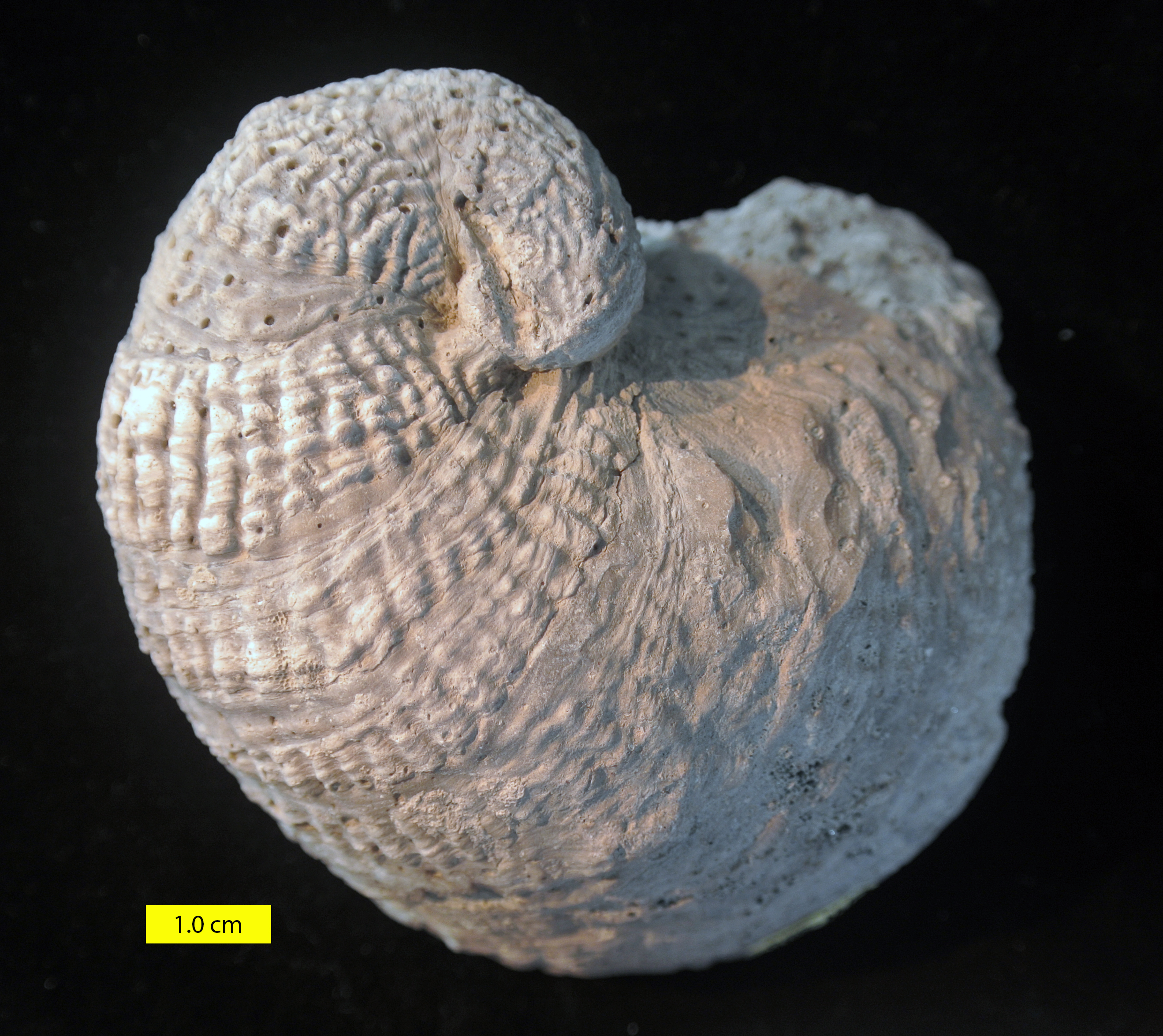
- Fossilized shell of the Jurassic-Cretaceous foam oyster Exogyra
  †Exogyra
  - †Exogyra costata
  - †Exogyra ponderosa
  - †Exogyra upatoiensis
- Fusinus
- †Gegania
- Gemmula
- †Gervillia
- Ginglymostoma
- Glossus
- Glycymeris
  - †Glycymeris rotundata
- †Gryphaea
- †Gyrineum
- †Hadrosaurus – tentative report
- †Hamites
- †Hamulus
- †Helicoceras
- Hemiscyllium
- †Hoploparia
- Hyala
- †Hybodus
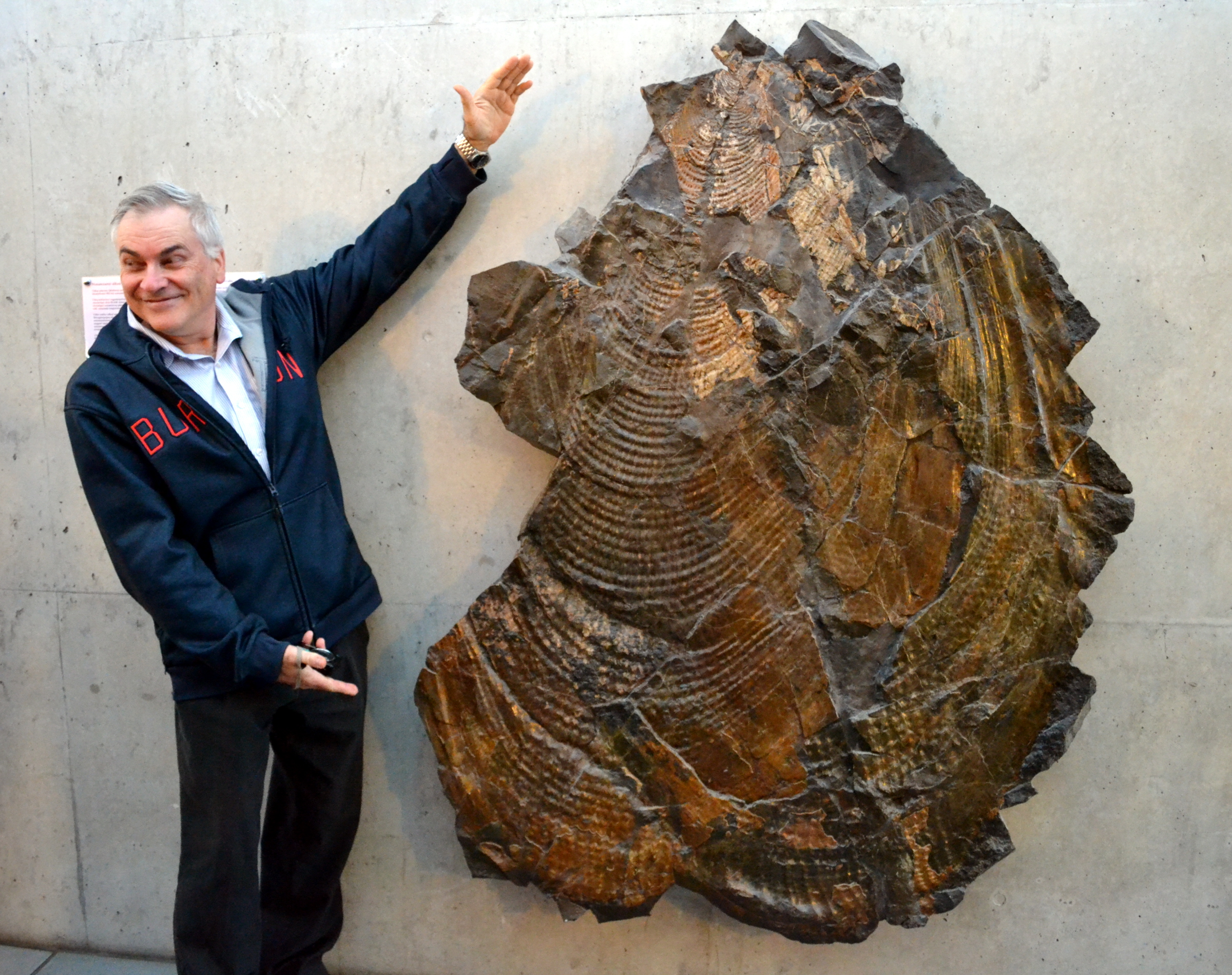
- Fossilized shell of the Early Jurassic-Late Cretaceous marine bivalve Inoceramus with a human indicating its size
  †Inoceramus
- †Ischyrhiza
  - †Ischyrhiza mira
- Lepisosteus
- Lima
- Limatula
- †Linearis
- †Linthia
- Linuparus
- Lithophaga
- Lopha
  - †Lopha falcata
  - †Lopha mesenterica
- †Lucina – tentative report
- †Mathilda
- Meretrix – tentative report
- †Micraster
- Modiolus
  - †Modiolus sedesclaris
  - †Modiolus sedesclarus
- †Morea
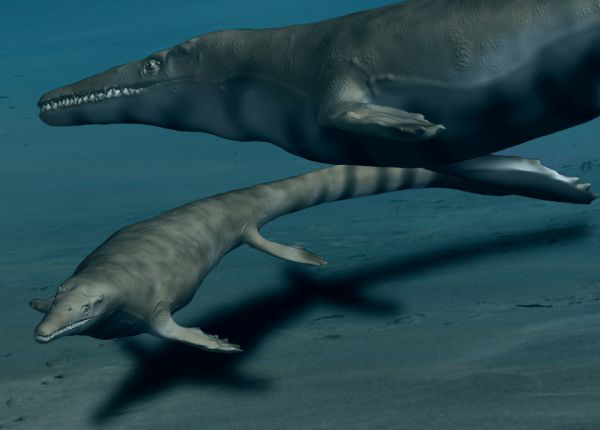
- Life restoration of two of the Late Cretaceous Mosasaurus
  †Mosasaurus
- †Mytilus – tentative report
- †Neithea
  - †Neithea bexarensis
- Nerita
- Neritina
- †Nostoceras
- Nozeba
- Nucula
  - †Nucula camia
  - †Nucula cuneifrons
  - †Nucula percrassa
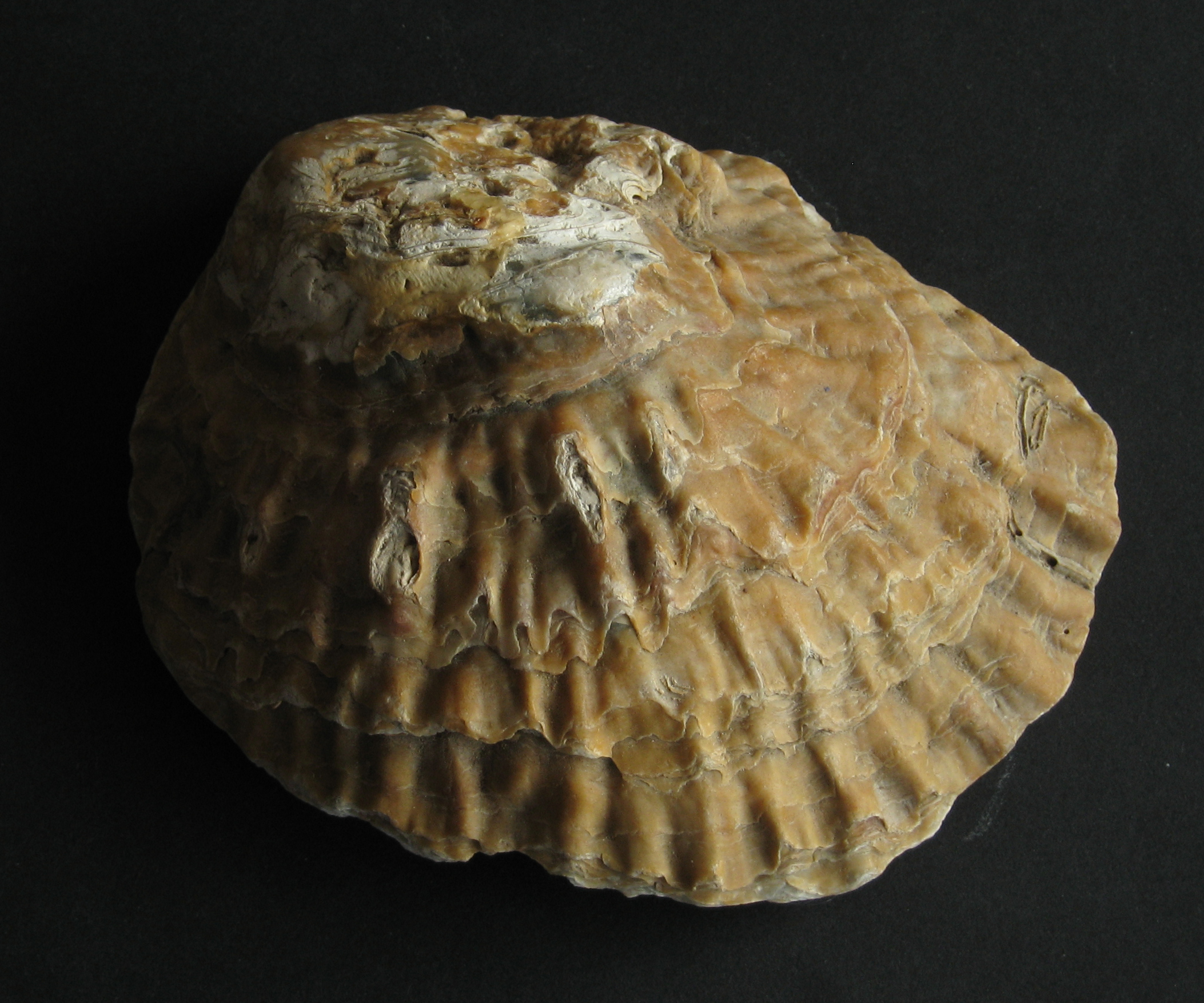
- Shell of an Ostrea, or oyster
  Ostrea
- †Pachydiscus
- †Pachymelania – tentative report
- Panopea
- †Paranomia
- Pecten
- Pholadomya
  - †Pholadomya occidentalis
- Pinna
- †Placenticeras
- †Plagiostoma
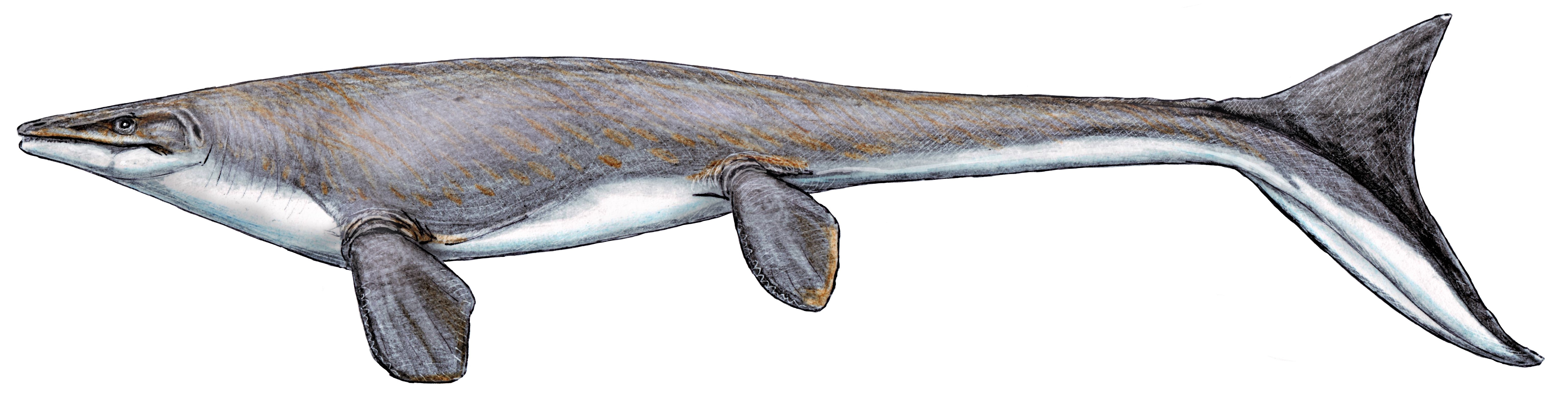
- Restoration of the Late Cretaceous mosasaur Platecarpus
  †Platecarpus – type locality for genus
  - †Platecarpus tympaniticus – type locality for species
- †Plesiotriton
- Plicatula
- Polinices
- †Protocardia
- †Pseudocorax
- †Pteria
- †Pterotrigonia
  - †Pterotrigonia angulicostata
  - †Pterotrigonia eufalensis
  - †Pterotrigonia eufaulensis
  - †Pterotrigonia thoracica
- †Ptychodus
  - †Ptychodus mortoni
- †Ptychotrygon
- Pycnodonte
  - †Pycnodonte belli
  - †Pycnodonte mutabilis
  - †Pycnodonte vesicularis
- Ringicula
  - †Ringicula clarki
  - †Ringicula pulchella
- †Sargana
- †Sassia
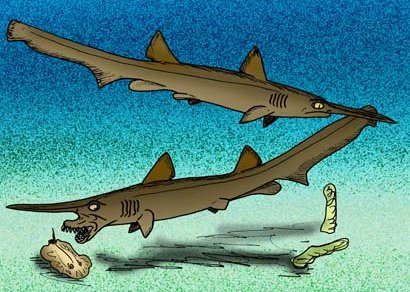
- Restoration of several of the Early Cretaceous-Miocene shark Scapanorhynchus
  †Scapanorhynchus
  - †Scapanorhynchus texanus
- †Scaphites
  - †Scaphites leei
- †Sclerorhynchus
- Seila
- Serpula
- †Sphenodiscus
  - †Sphenodiscus beecheri
  - †Sphenodiscus lobatus
  - †Sphenodiscus pleurisepta
- Spondylus
- Squalicorax
  - †Squalicorax kaupi
- Stosicia
- Teinostoma
- Tellina
- †Tenea
- Thracia
- †Tornus – tentative report
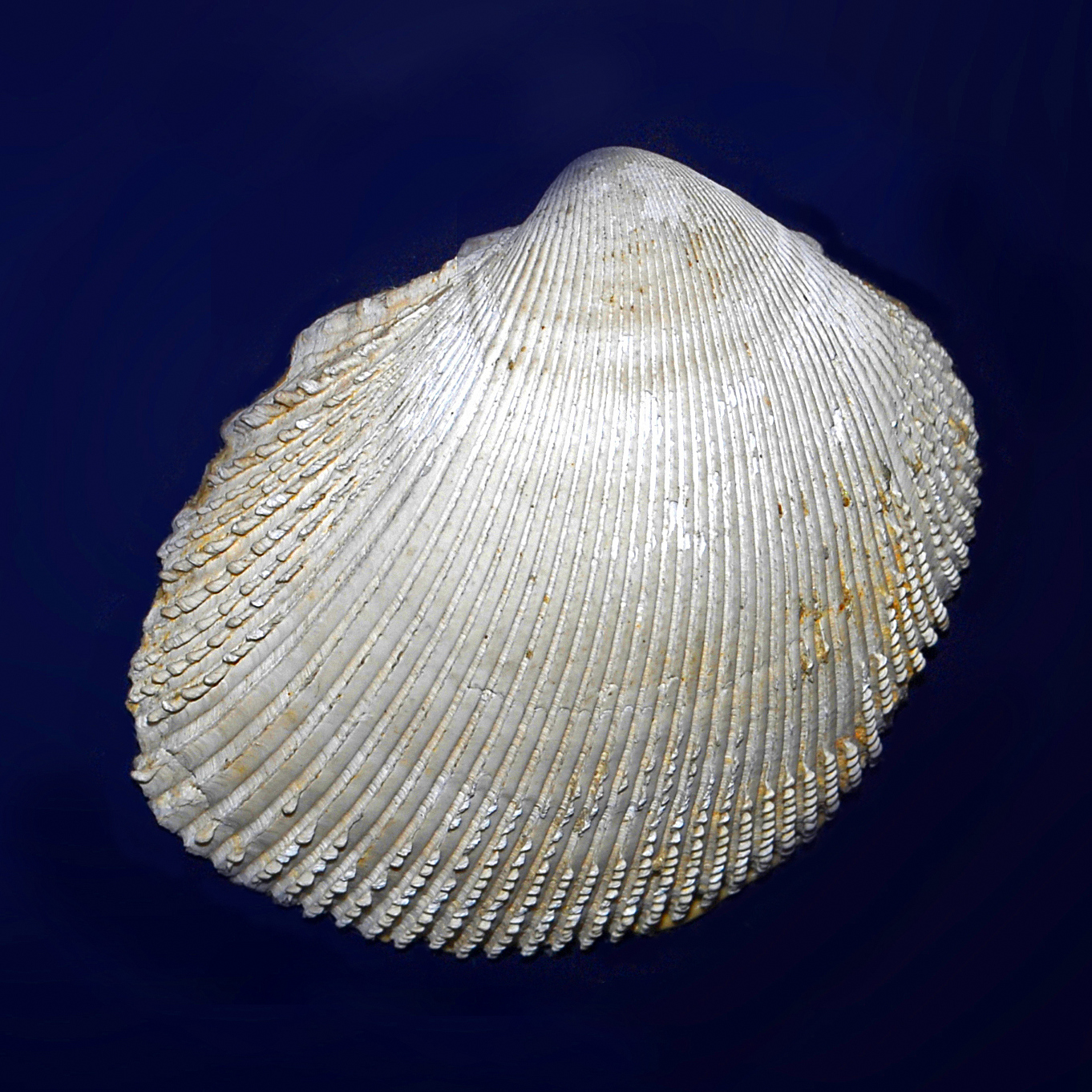
- Fossilized shell of a Trachycardium cockle
  Trachycardium
  - †Trachycardium eufaulensis
- Trichotropis
- †Trigonia
- †Trigonostoma
- †Turrilites
- Turritella
  - †Turritella bilira
  - †Turritella chalybeatensis
  - †Turritella hilgardi
  - †Turritella paravertebroides
  - †Turritella tippana
  - †Turritella trilira
  - †Turritella vertebroides
- †Tympanotonus
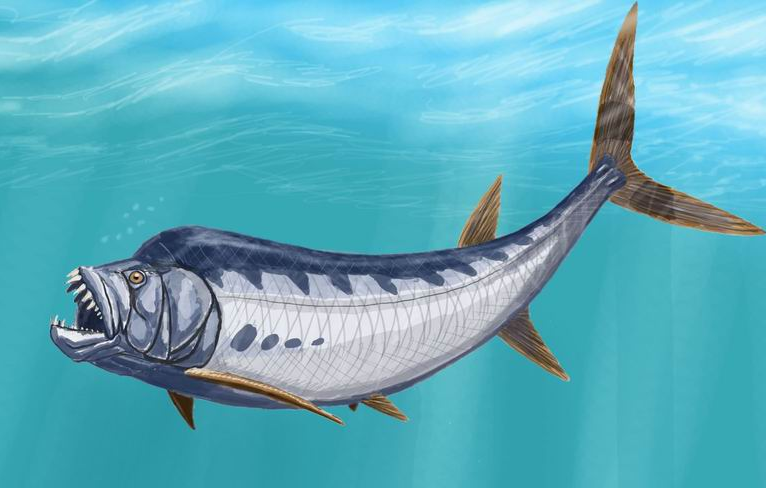
- Life restoration of the Cretaceous bony fish Xiphactinus
  †Xiphactinus
  - †Xiphactinus audax

== Cenozoic ==
- Abra
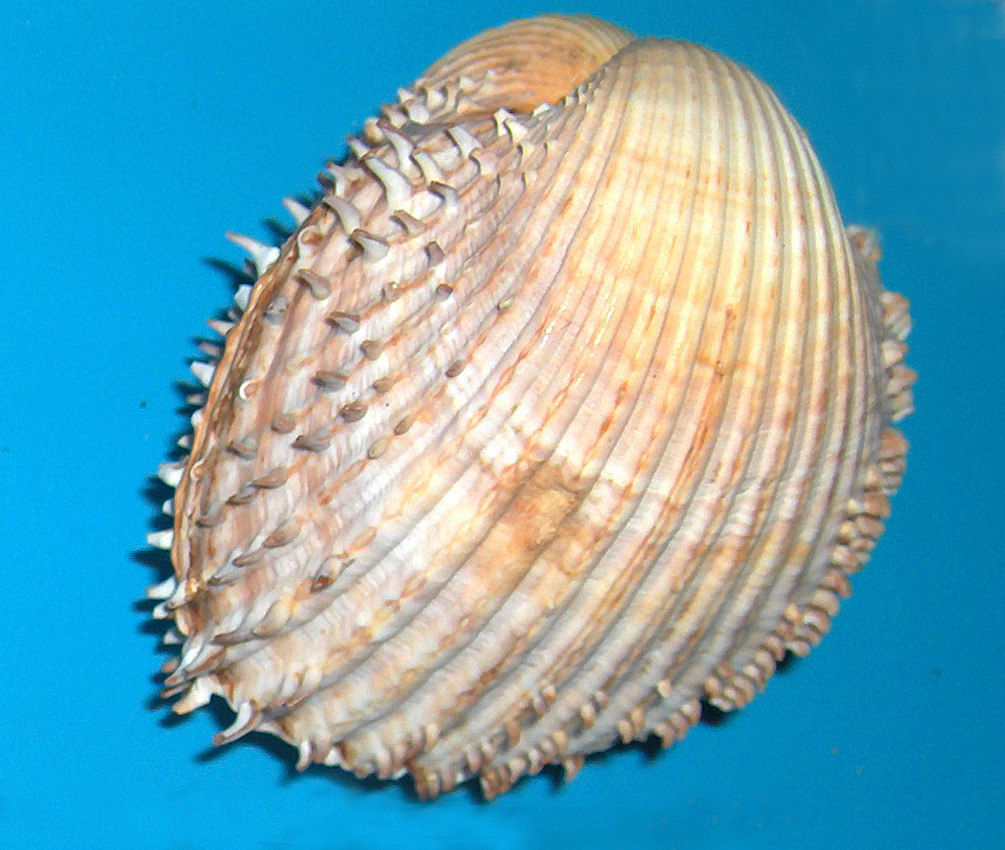
- Shell of an Acanthocardia cockle
  Acanthocardia
- Acar
- Acirsa – tentative report
- Aclis
- †Acra
- Acteocina
- Acteon
- Aequipecten
- Aetobatus
- Agaronia
- Agatrix
- Alaba
- Alabina
- Albula
- Alligator
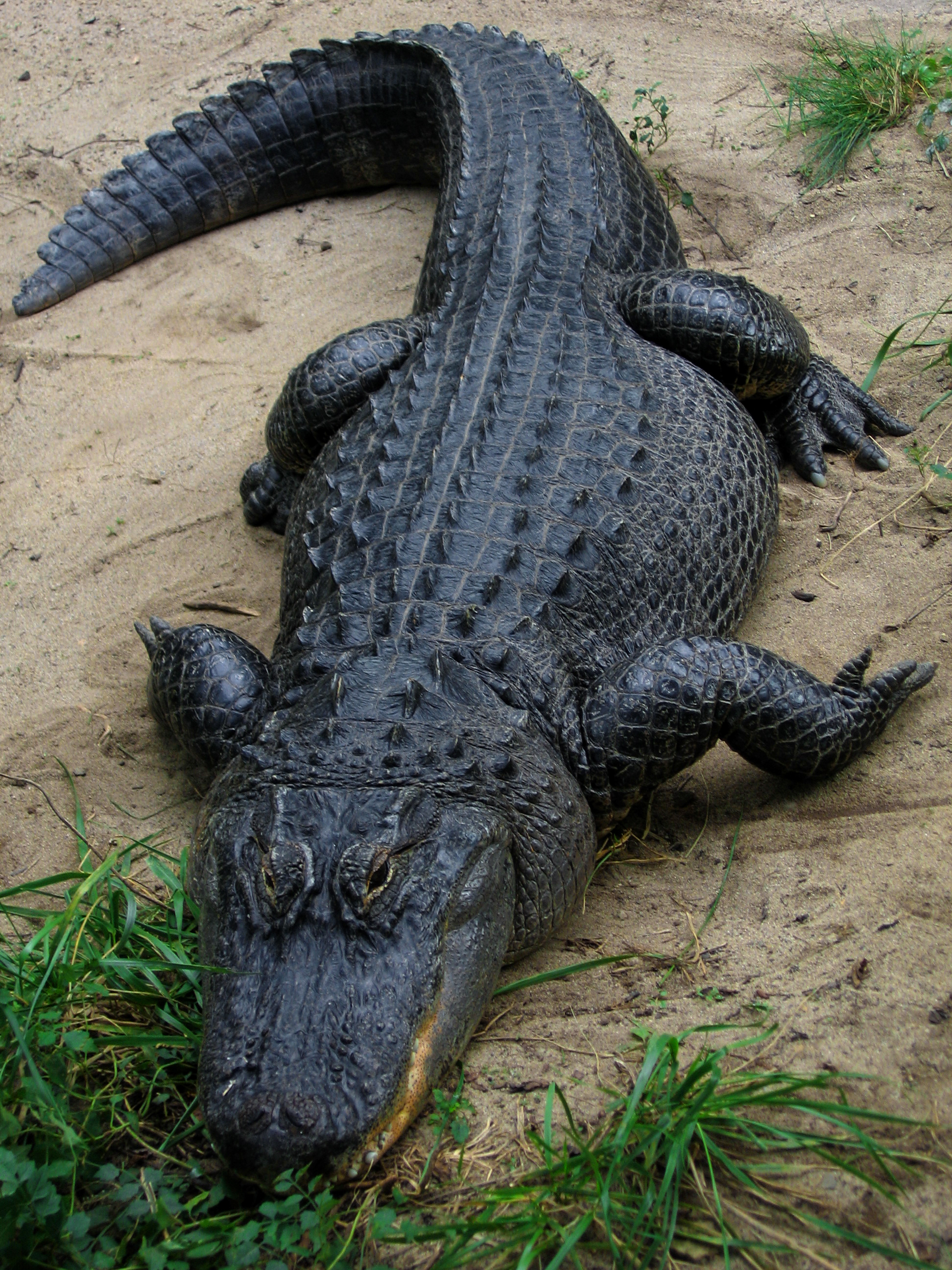
  - A living Alligator mississippiensis, or American alligator
    †Alligator mississippiensis
- †Altrix
- Americardia
- Ammonia
- †Amonia
- Anadara
- Ancilla
- Anodontia
- Anomia
- †Anomotodon
- Antalis
- Apiotoma
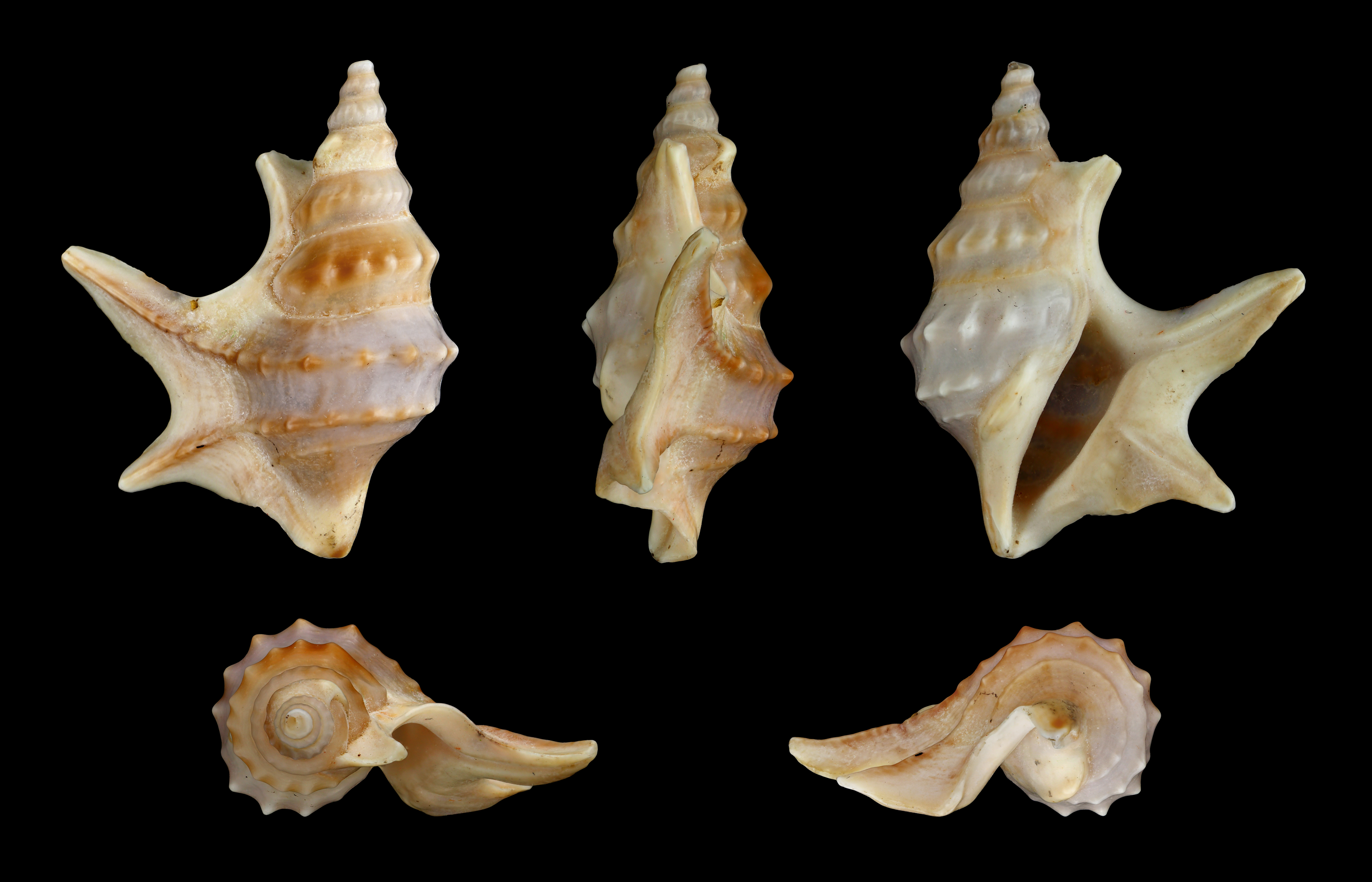
- Multiple views of a shell of an Aporrhais pelican foot sea snail
  Aporrhais
- †Arbia
- †Archaeomanta
- Architectonica
- Arene
- Arius
- Astarte
- Asthenotoma
- Astrangia
- Athleta
- Atrina
- †Aturia
- Atys
- Axelella
- Balanophyllia
- †Baluchicardia
- Barbatia
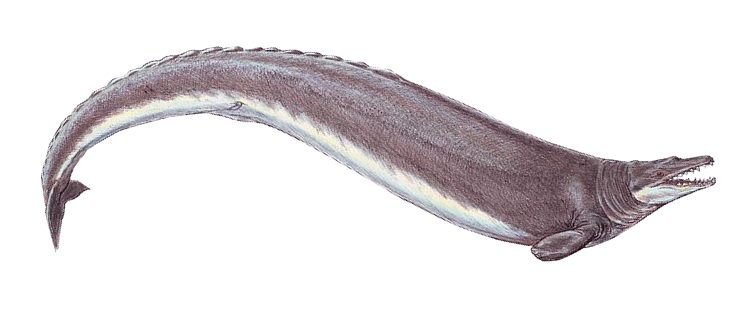
- Life restoration of the Eocene whale Basilosaurus
  †Basilosaurus
  - †Basilosaurus cetoides
- Bathytoma
- †Belosaepia
- Bison
- Bittium
- †Bonellitia
- Bos
- Brachidontes
- Bregmaceros
- †Brychaetus
- Bulla
- Bullia
- †Burnhamia
- Busycon
- Cadulus
- Caecum
- Caestocorbula
- Callianassa
- Calliostoma
- Callista
- Calotrophon
  - †Calotrophon ostrearum
- Calyptraea
- Cantharus
- Capulus
- Carcharhinus
- Carcharias
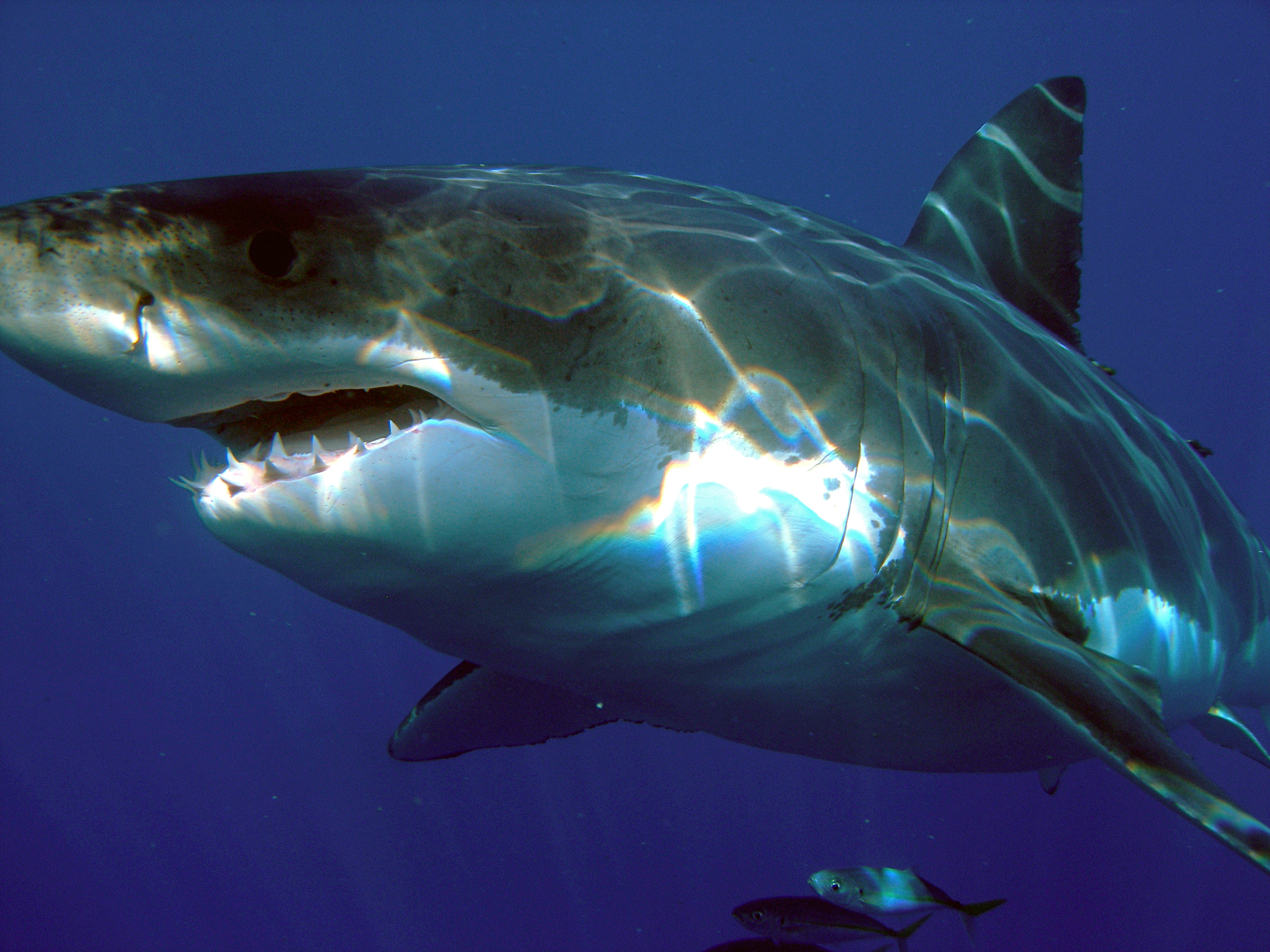
- A living Carcharodon shark
  Carcharodon
- Cassis
- Cerithiella
- Cervus
- Chama
- Chamelea
- Chaoborus
- Chelonibia
- Chicoreus
- Chione
- Chiton
- Chlamys
- Circulus
- Cirsotrema
- Clathurella
- Clava
- Clavilithes
- Clio
- Closia
- Clypeaster
- Cochlespira
- Codakia
- Columbellopsis
- Conger
- Conomitra
- †Conorbis
- Conus
- Coralliophila
- Corbula
- Cordieria
- †Corvina
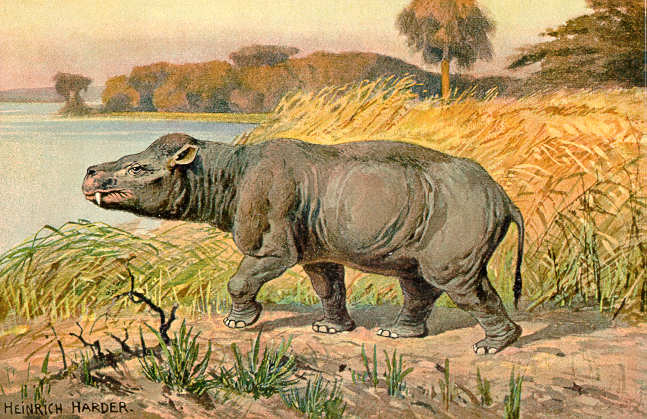
- Life restoration of the Paleocene-Eocene pantodont mammal Coryphodon. Heinrich Harder (1920).
  †Coryphodon
- †Coupatezia
- Crassispira
- Crassostrea
- Crenella
- Crepidula
- †Cretolamna
- Crisia
- †Crommium
- Cuna – tentative report
- Cuspidaria
- Cylichna
- †Cylindracanthus
- Cymatium
- Cymatosyrinx
- Cymia
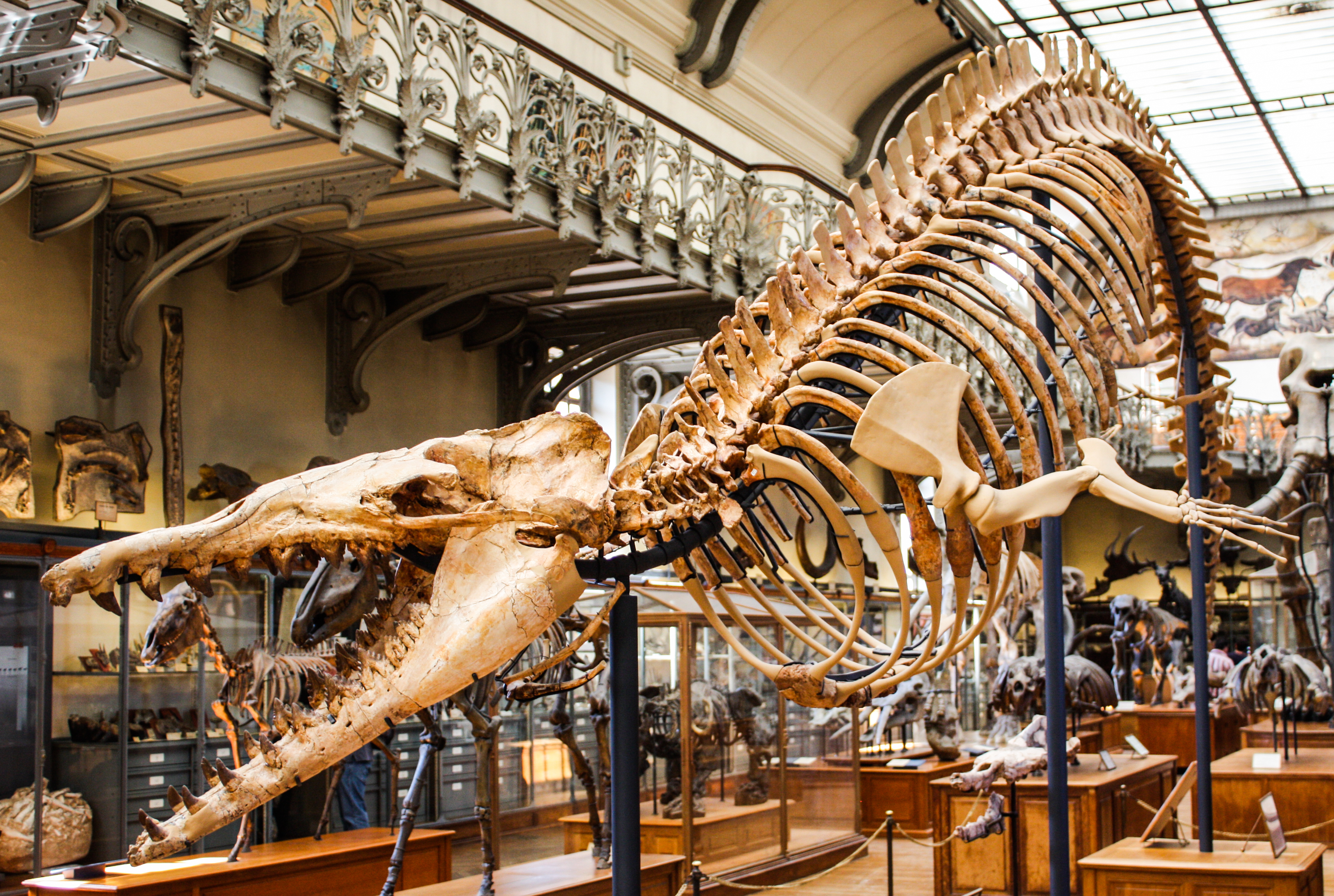
- Mounted fossilized skeleton of the Eocene whale Cynthiacetus
  †Cynthiacetus – type locality for genus
- Cypraea
- Cypraedia
- Daphnella
- Dasyatis
- Dendrophyllia
- Dentalium
- Dermomurex
- †Diacodexis
- Dimya
- Dinocardium
- Diodon
- Diodora
- Discopsis
- Distorsio
- †Dolicholatirus
- Donax
- †Dorudon
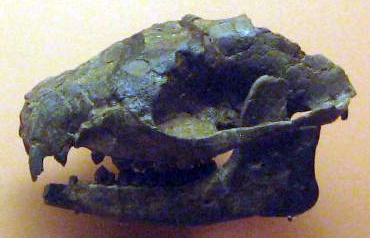
- Fossilized skull of the Paleocene-Eocene mammal Ectocion
  †Ectocion
- †Egertonia
- Elphidium
- Emydoidea
  - †Emydoidea blandingii
- Enaeta
- †Eosurcula
- Epitonium
- Equus
- Ervilia
- Erycina
- Eulima
- Eulimella
- Eumetula
- Eunaticina
- †Eunicella
- Euspira
- †Exilia
- †Fedora
- †Ficopsis
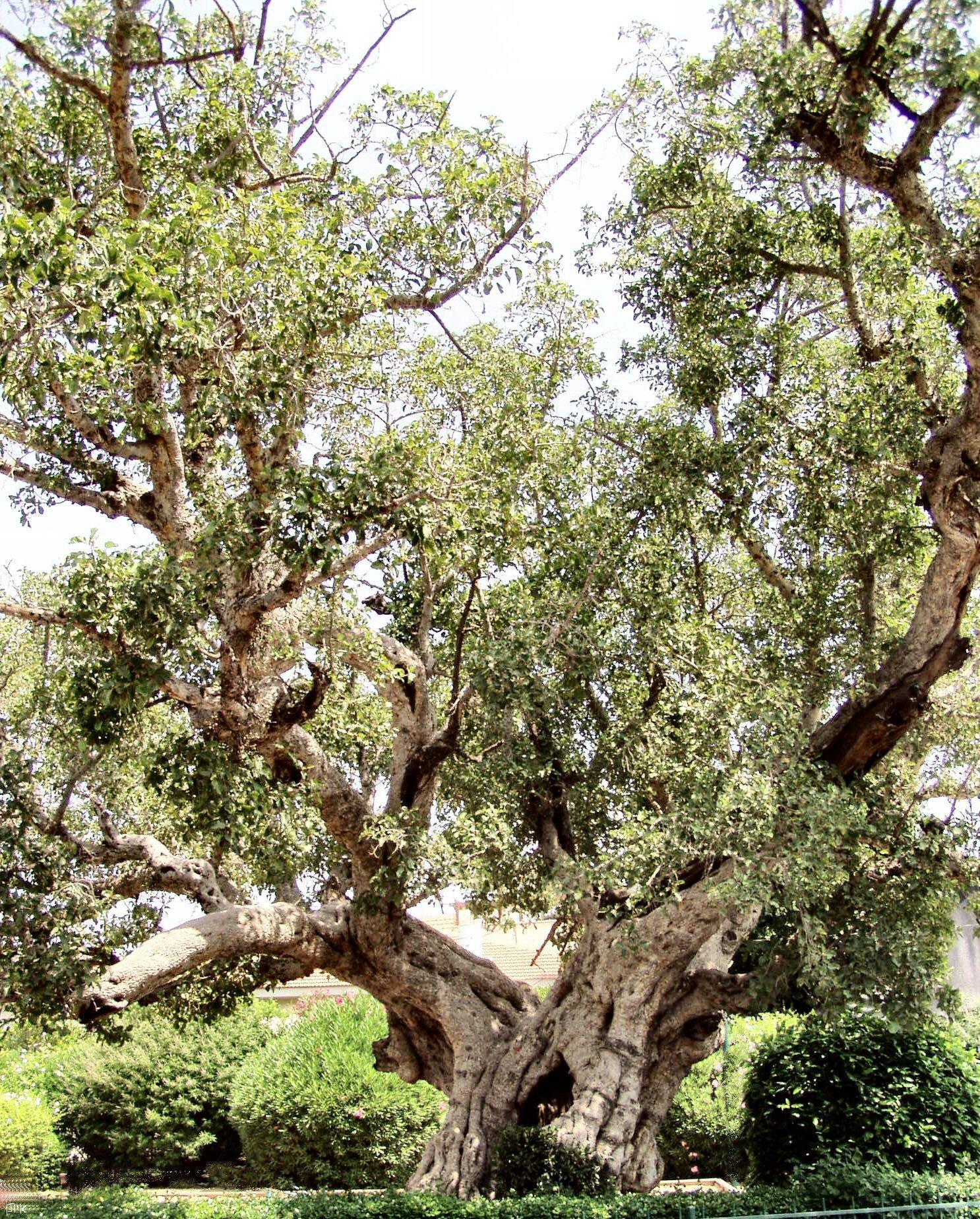
- A living Ficus, or fig tree
  Ficus
- Flabellum
- Fulgurofusus
- Fusinus
- Fustiaria
- Galeocerdo
- Galeodea
- Galeorhinus
- Galeus
- Gari
- Gastrochaena
- Gegania
- Gemmula
- Genota
- Geochelone
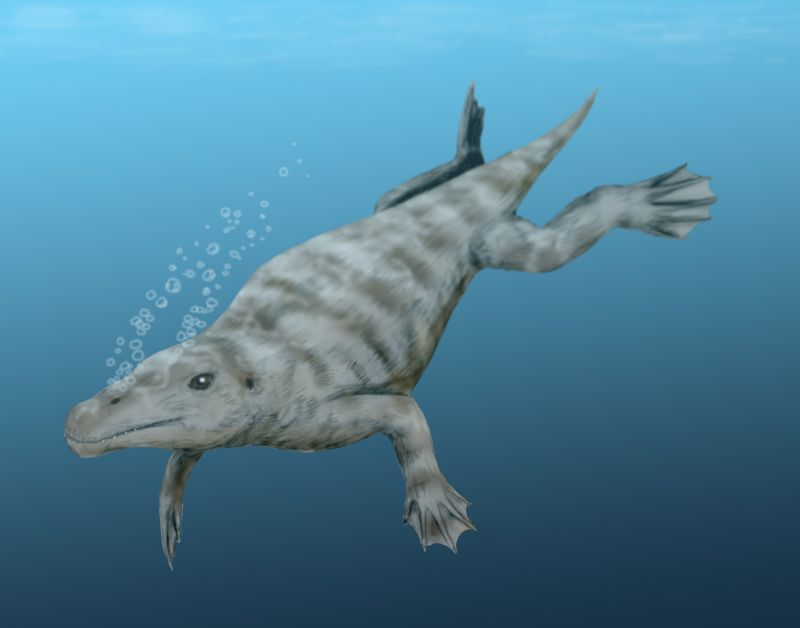
- Life restoration of the Eocene whale Georgiacetus
  †Georgiacetus
  - †Georgiacetus vogtlensis
- †Gigantostrea
- Ginglymostoma
- Globigerina
- Globularia
- Glycymeris
- Glyptemys
  - †Glyptemys insculpta
- Glyptoactis
- †Gracilocyon
- Graptemys
- Harpa
- †Harpactocarcinus
- Hastula
- Haustator
- †Hemiauchenia
  - †Hemiauchenia macrocephala
- Hemipristis
- †Hemisurcula
- †Hesperotestudo
- Heterodontus
- Hexaplex
- Hipponix
- Homo
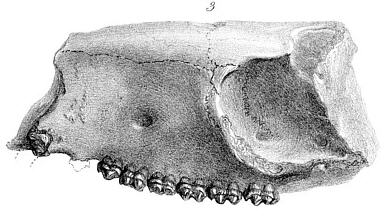
- Illustration of a fossilized partial cranium of the Eocene odd-toed ungulates Hyracotherium
  †Hyracotherium
- Isurus
- †Jefitchia
- Kellia
- Kuphus
- Laevicardium
- Lamna
- Latirus
- Lepisosteus
- Lima
- Limacina
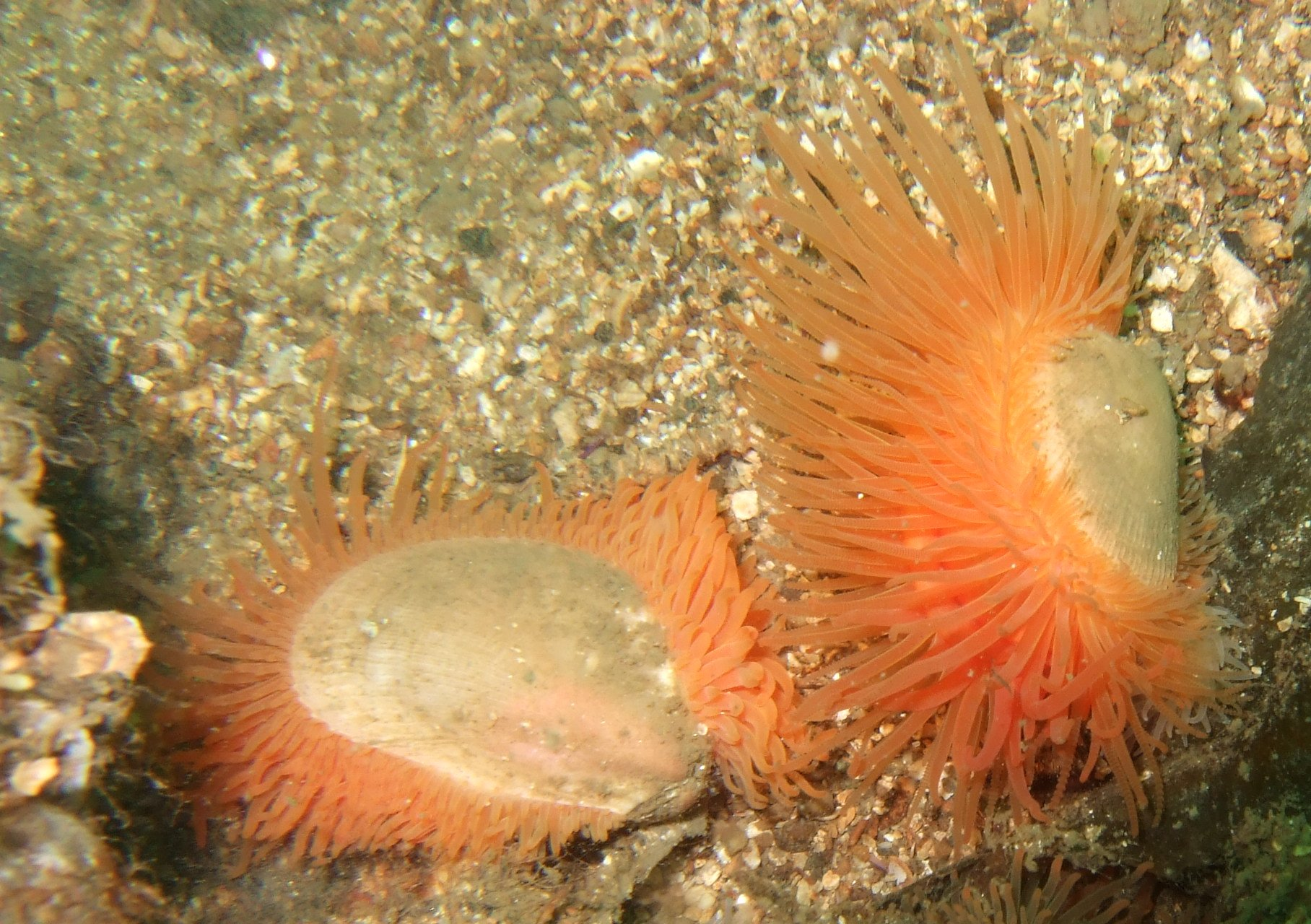
- Living Limaria, or file shells
  Limaria
- Linga
- Litiopa
- Lopha
- Lophius
- Lucina
- Lunularia
- Lyria
- Macrocallista
- Mactra
- †Mammut
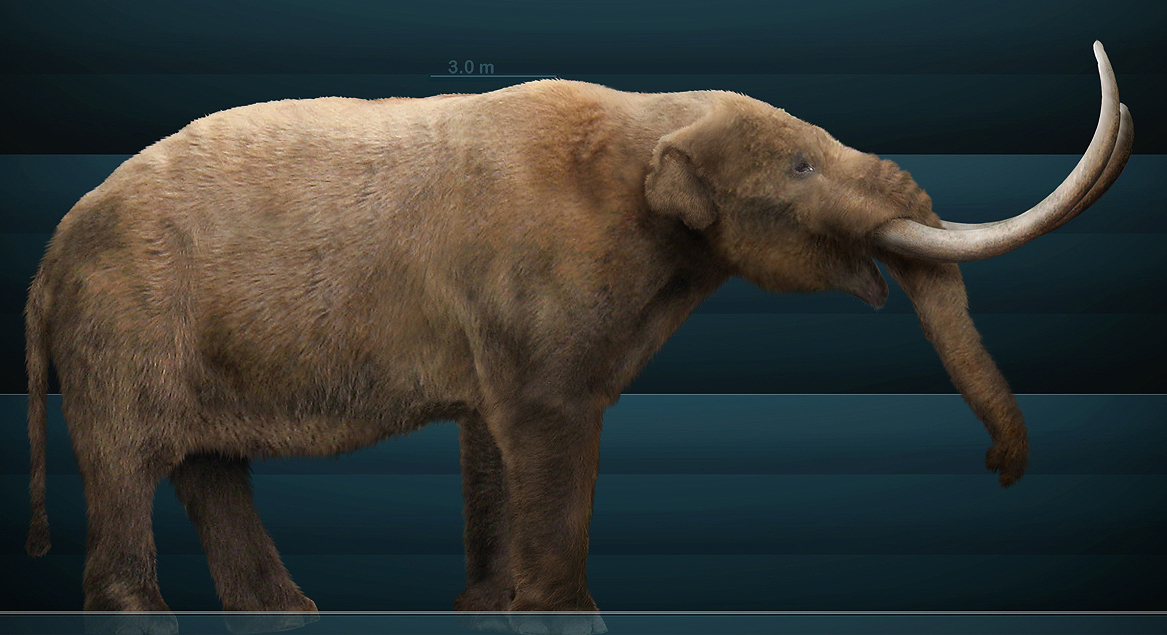
  - Restoration of a Mammut americanum, or American mastodon
    †Mammut americanum
- Maretia
- Margaretta
- Marginella
- †Mastigophora
- Mathilda – tentative report
- Mathilda
- †Megalonyx
  - †Megalonyx jeffersonii
- Melanella
- Mesalia
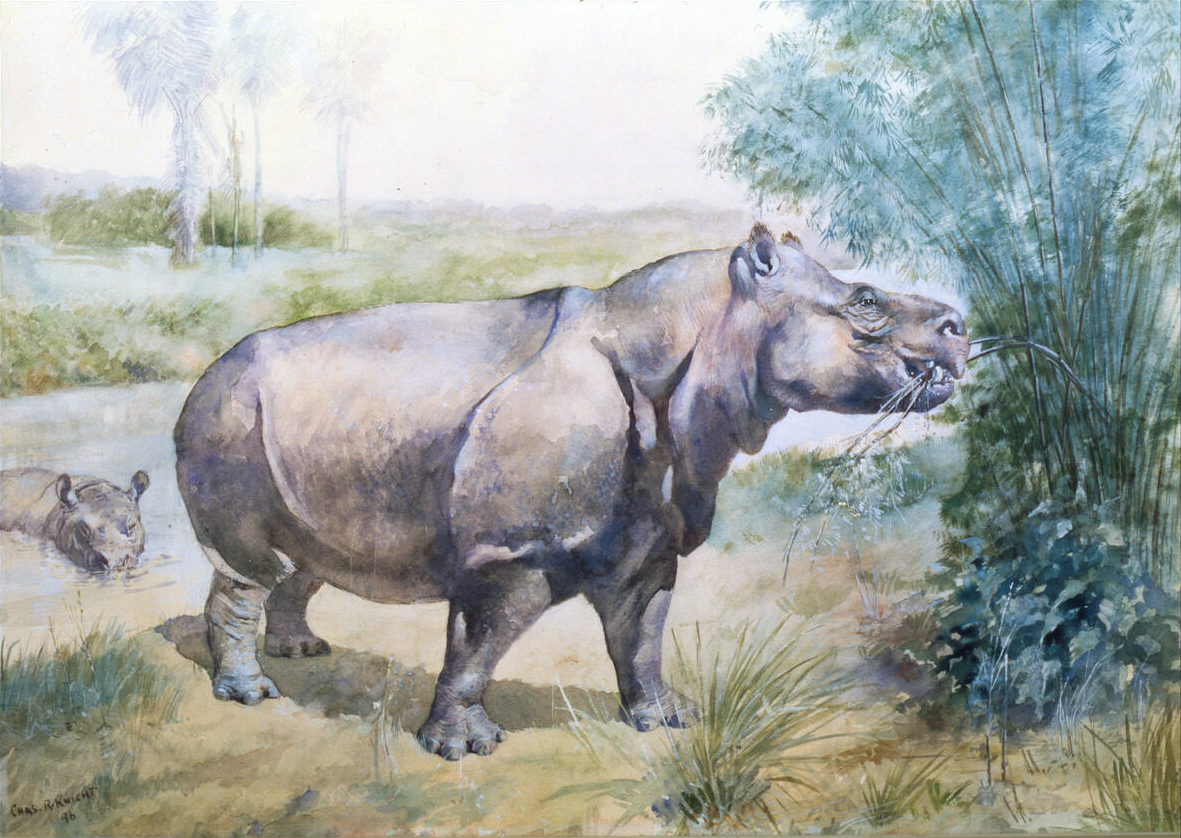
- Restoration of the Eocene-Miocene swamp rhinoceros Metamynodon. Charles R. Knight (1896).
  †Metamynodon
  - †Metamynodon planifrons
- Metula
- †Miacis
- †Michela
- Microdrillia
- †Mimoperadectes
- Mitra
- Mitrella
- Modiolus – tentative report
- Mulinia
  - †Mulinia lateralis
- Murex
- Murexiella
- Mustelus
- Myliobatis
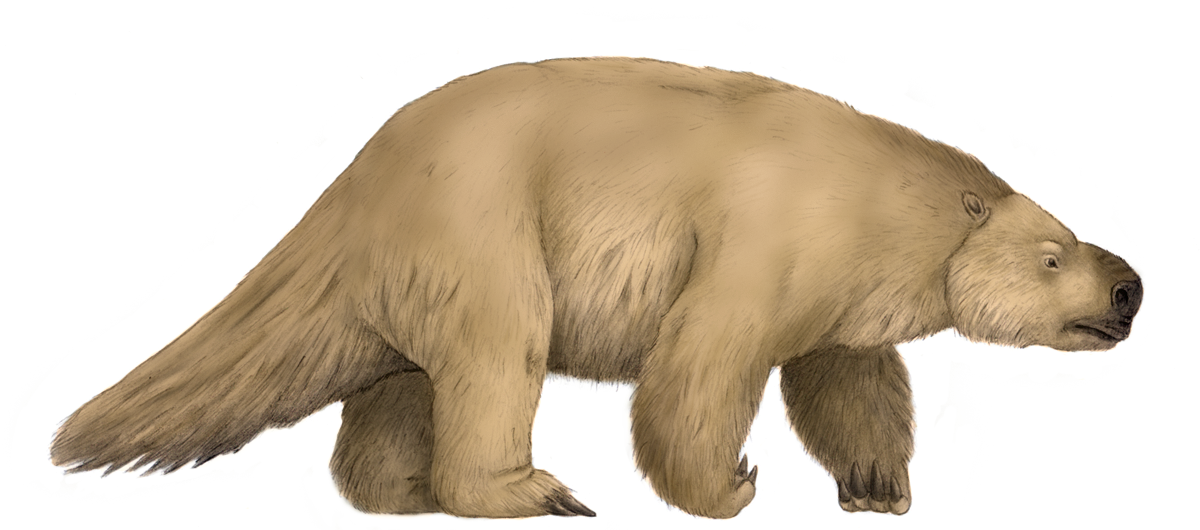
- Life restoration of the Pleistocene-Holocene ground sloth Mylodon with an inset depicting its excrement and a skin fragment
  †Mylodon
- †Nannippus
- Nassarius
- †Natchitochia
- Natica
- Naticarius
- Nebrius
- Neverita
- Niso
- Norrisia
- †Notiotitanops – type locality for genus
- Nucula
- Oculina
- Odontaspis
- Odostomia
- Oliva
- †Ophiomorpha
- Ostrea
- †Otodus
- †Oxyrhina
- †Pachecoa
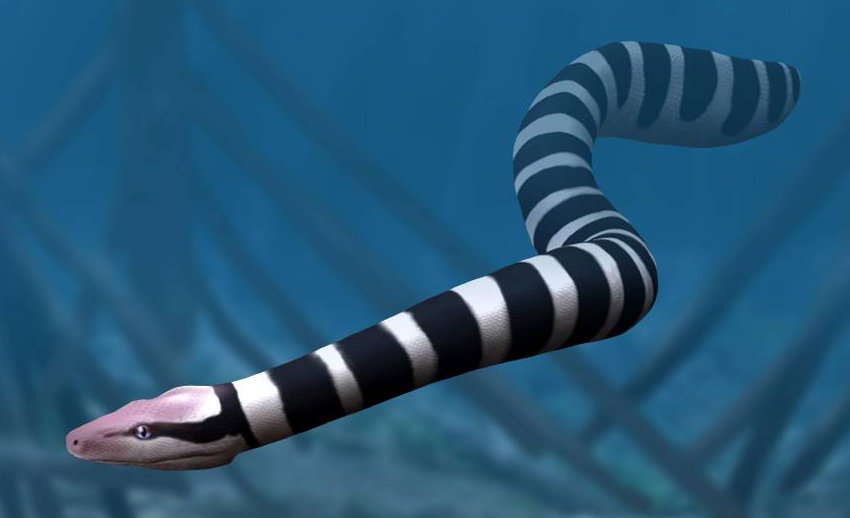
- Restoration of the Cretaceous-Eocene sea snake Palaeophis
  †Palaeophis
- †Palaeosinopa
- Panopea
- Panthera
  - †Panthera leo
- †Paramys
- Pecten
- Penion
- †Peratherium
- Petaloconchus
- Phalium
- Philine
- Pholadomya
- Pholas
- Phos
- Phyllodus
- Phyllonotus
- †Physogaleus
- Pitar
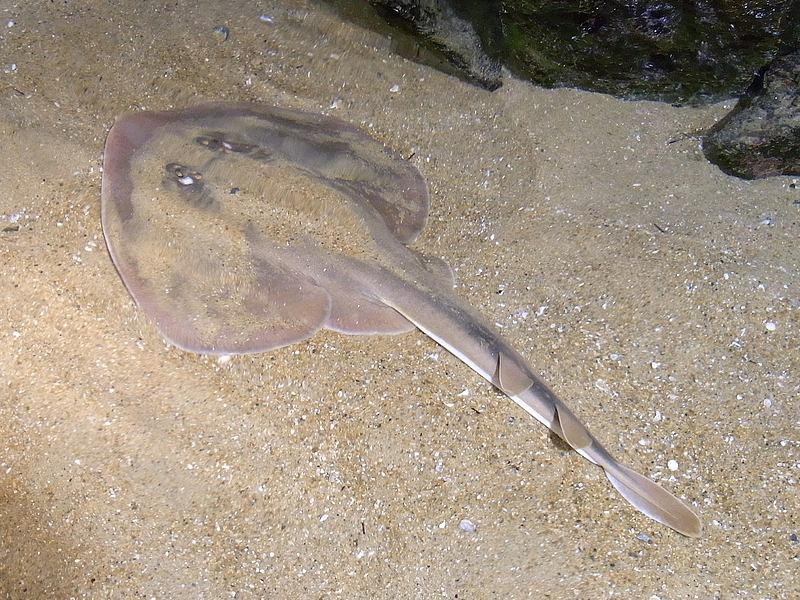
- A living Platyrhina ray
  Platyrhina
- Pleurofusia
  - †Pleurofusia fluctuosa
  - †Pleurofusia longirostropsis
- Pleuromeris
- †Pleurostoma
- Plicatula
- Poirieria
- Polinices
- Polyschides
- Porella
- †Potamides
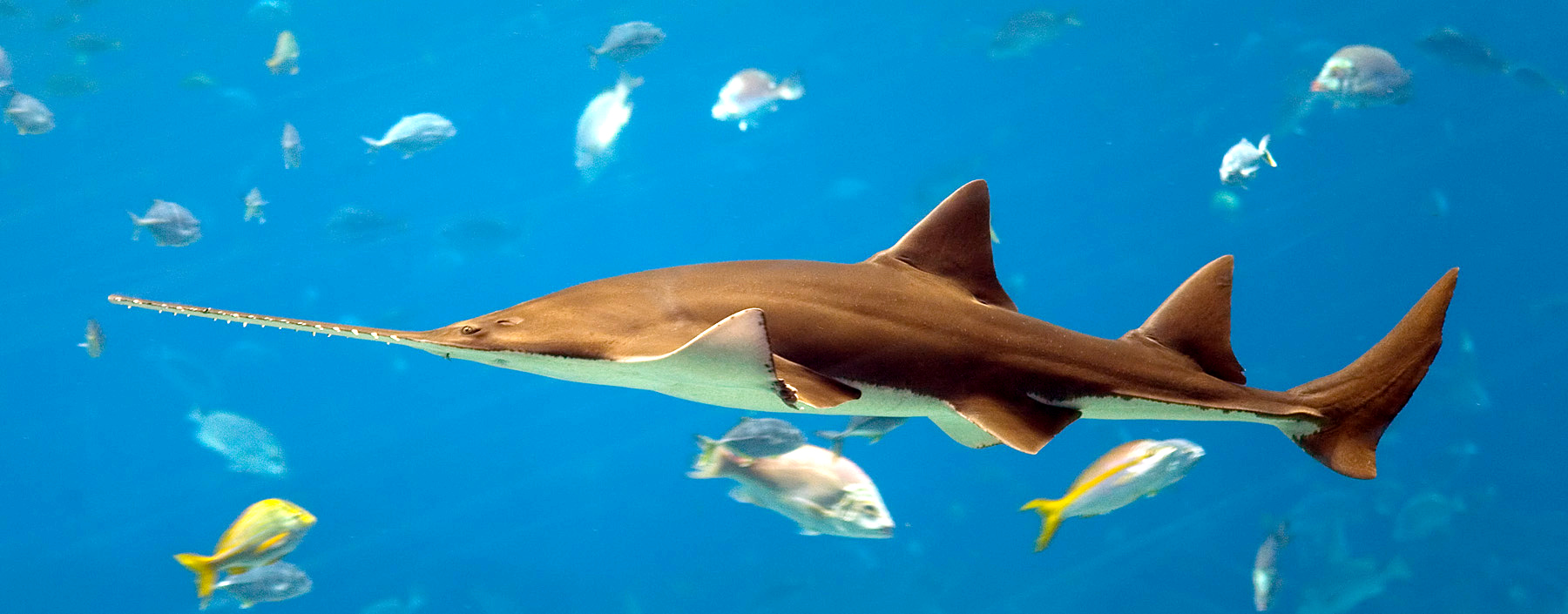
- A living Pristis sawfish
  Pristis
- Prunum
- †Pseudolatirus
- Pseudoliva
- Pteria
- †Pterochelus
- Pterynotus
- Puncturella
- Pycnodonte
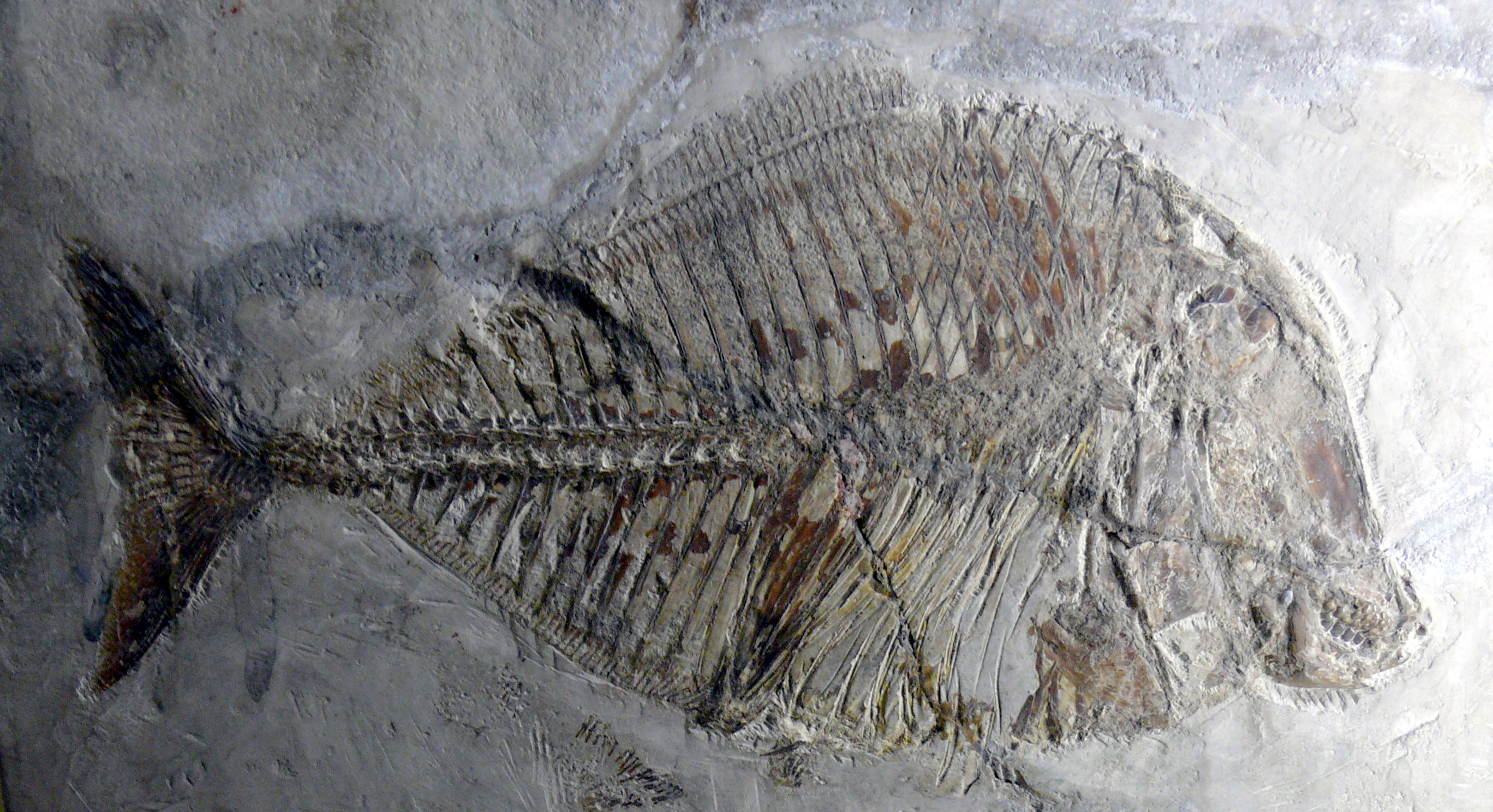
- Fossilized skeleton of the Late Cretaceous-Eocene bony fish Pycnodus
  Pycnodus
- Pyramidella
- Rangia
- Raphitoma
- Reteporella
- Retusa
- Rhinobatos
- Rhinoptera
- Rhynchoconger
- Rictaxis
- Ringicula
- Rissoina
- Sassia
- Scaphander
- Scapharca
- Scaphella – or unidentified comparable form
- Schizaster
- Sconsia
- Scyliorhinus
- Seila
- Semele
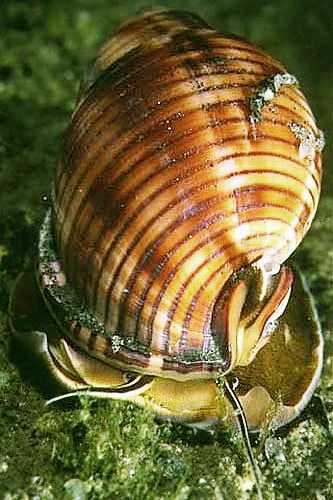
- A living Semicassis helmet sea snail
  Semicassis
- †Seraphs
- Serpulorbis
- Sigatica
- †Sinistrella
- Sinum
- Siphonalia
- Siphonochelus
- Skena
- Solariella
- Solecurtus
- Sphyraena – tentative report
- Spisula
- Spondylus
- †Striatolamia
- Strioterebrum
- Strombiformis
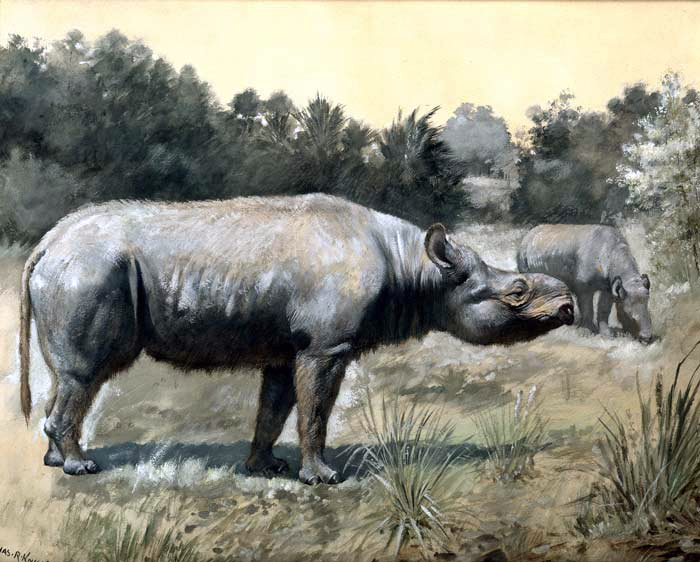
- Life restoration of the Eocene-Oligocene cow-sized rhinoceros Subhyracodon. Charles R. Knight (1890s).
  †Subhyracodon
- Sveltella
- Syntomodrillia
  - †Syntomodrillia tantula
- †Teilhardina
  - †Teilhardina magnoliana
- Teinostoma
- Tellina
- Tenagodus
- Terebra
- Teredo
- Terrapene
  - †Terrapene carolina
- Thracia
- Tornus
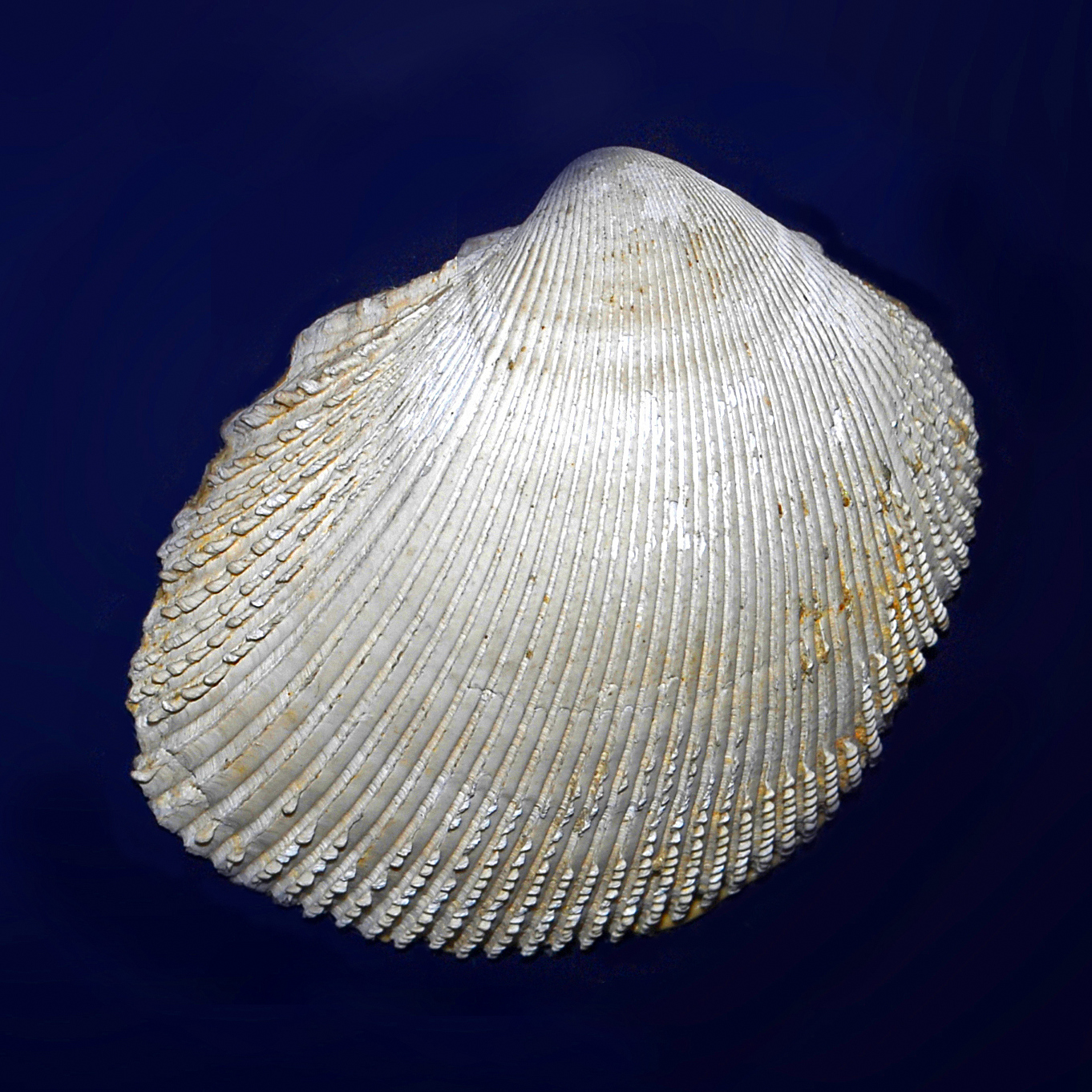
- Fossilized shell of a Trachycardium cockle
  Trachycardium
- Trigonostoma
- †Trinacria
- Triphora
- Trochita
- †Trygon
- Turbonilla
  - †Turbonilla major
- Turricula
- Turris – report made of unidentified related form or using admittedly obsolete nomenclature
- Turritella
- Typhina
- Typhis
- †Uintacyon
- Umbraculum
- †Unitas
- Urosalpinx
- Ursus
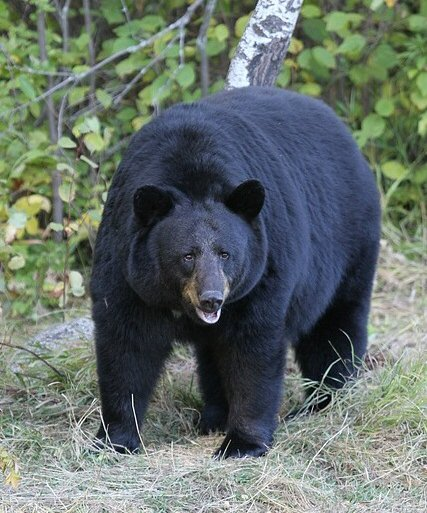
  - A living Ursus americanus, or American black bear
    †Ursus americanus
- †Vassacyon
- Vasum
- Venericardia
- Venus – report made of unidentified related form or using admittedly obsolete nomenclature
- Verticordia
- Vexillum
- Vitrinella
- †Viverravus
- Volema
- Xenophora
- †Xiphiorhynchus
- Xylophaga – tentative report
- Yoldia
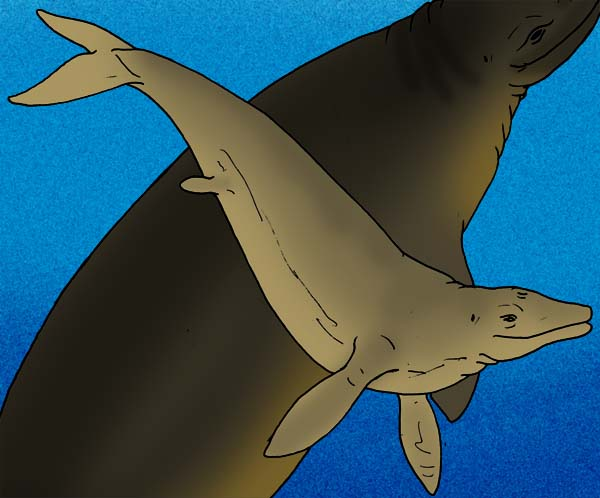
- Life restoration of the Eocene whale Zygorhiza
  †Zygorhiza
  - †Zygorhiza kochii
