= Dimya maoria =

Scientific classification
- Kingdom: Animalia
- Phylum: Mollusca
- Class: Bivalvia
- Order: Pectinida
- Family: Dimyidae
- Genus: Dimya
- Species: D. maoria

Binomial name
- Dimya maoria Powell, 1937

Species of bivalve

Dimya maoria is a species of clam, a marine bivalve mollusk in the family Dimyidae.
