= Triphora pupaeformis =

Scientific classification
- Kingdom: Animalia
- Phylum: Mollusca
- Class: Gastropoda
- Subclass: Caenogastropoda
- Order: incertae sedis
- Family: Triphoridae
- Genus: Triphora
- Species: T. pupaeformis

Binomial name
- Triphora pupaeformis (Deshayes, 1863)

Synonyms
- Triphoris pupaeformis Deshayes, 1863 (original combination)

Species of sea snail

Triphora pupaeformis is a species of sea snail, a marine gastropod mollusk in the family Triphoridae. The scientific name of the species was first validly published in 1863 by Gérard Paul Deshayes.

== Distribution ==
This marine species occurs in the Indian Ocean off Réunion.
