= Pleurofusia phasma =

Scientific classification
- Kingdom: Animalia
- Phylum: Mollusca
- Class: Gastropoda
- Subclass: Caenogastropoda
- Order: Neogastropoda
- Superfamily: Conoidea
- Family: Drilliidae
- Genus: †Pleurofusia
- Species: †P. phasma

Binomial name
- †Pleurofusia phasma Vredenburg 1921

Synonyms
- † Surcula (Pleurofusia) phasma Vredenburg 1921

Extinct species of gastropod

Pleurofusia phasma is an extinct species of sea snail, a marine gastropod mollusk in the family Drilliidae.

== Distribution ==
This extinct marine species was found in Miocene strata of Myanmar, age range 23.03 to 20.43 Ma
