= Pleurofusia paulensis =

Scientific classification
- Kingdom: Animalia
- Phylum: Mollusca
- Class: Gastropoda
- Subclass: Caenogastropoda
- Order: Neogastropoda
- Superfamily: Conoidea
- Family: Drilliidae
- Genus: †Pleurofusia
- Species: †P. paulensis

Binomial name
- †Pleurofusia paulensis Lozouet, 2015

Extinct species of gastropod

Pleurofusia paulensis is an extinct species of sea snail, a marine gastropod mollusc in the family Drilliidae.

== Distribution ==
This extinct marine species was found France.
