= Pleurofusia crassinoda =

Scientific classification
- Kingdom: Animalia
- Phylum: Mollusca
- Class: Gastropoda
- Subclass: Caenogastropoda
- Order: Neogastropoda
- Superfamily: Conoidea
- Family: Drilliidae
- Genus: †Pleurofusia
- Species: †P. crassinoda

Binomial name
- †Pleurofusia crassinoda (Des Moulins, 1842)

Synonyms
- † Pleurotoma crassinoda Des Moulins, 1842 (original combination)

Extinct species of gastropod

Pleurofusia crassinoda is an extinct species of sea snail, a marine gastropod mollusk in the family Drilliidae.

== Distribution ==
This extinct species was found in France.
