= Pleurofusia dowlingi =

Scientific classification
- Kingdom: Animalia
- Phylum: Mollusca
- Class: Gastropoda
- Subclass: Caenogastropoda
- Order: Neogastropoda
- Superfamily: Conoidea
- Family: Drilliidae
- Genus: †Pleurofusia
- Species: †P. dowlingi

Binomial name
- †Pleurofusia dowlingi Petuch 1997

Extinct species of gastropod

Pleurofusia dowlingi is an extinct species of sea snail, a marine gastropod mollusk in the family Drilliidae.

== Description ==
The length of the shell attains 26 mm.

== Distribution ==
This extinct marine species was found in Oligocene strata of west central Florida, USA; age range: 33.9 to 28.4 Ma.
