= Pleurofusia feddeni =

Scientific classification
- Kingdom: Animalia
- Phylum: Mollusca
- Class: Gastropoda
- Subclass: Caenogastropoda
- Order: Neogastropoda
- Superfamily: Conoidea
- Family: Drilliidae
- Genus: †Pleurofusia
- Species: †P. feddeni

Binomial name
- †Pleurofusia feddeni Noetling 1895

Synonyms
- † Fasciolaria feddeni (Noetling 1895); † Surcula (Pleurofusia) feddeni Noetling 1895; † Surcula feddeni Noetling 1895

Extinct species of gastropod

Pleurofusia feddeni is an extinct species of sea snail, a marine gastropod mollusk in the family Drilliidae.

== Distribution ==
This extinct marine species was found in Oligocene strata of Myanmar; age range:28.4 to 23.03 Ma.
