= Pleurofusia pseudosubtilis =

Scientific classification
- Kingdom: Animalia
- Phylum: Mollusca
- Class: Gastropoda
- Subclass: Caenogastropoda
- Order: Neogastropoda
- Superfamily: Conoidea
- Family: Drilliidae
- Genus: †Pleurofusia
- Species: †P. pseudosubtilis

Binomial name
- †Pleurofusia pseudosubtilis (Peyrot, 1931)

Synonyms
- † Surcula pseudosubtilis Peyrot, 1931 (original combination)

Extinct species of gastropod

Pleurofusia pseudosubtilis is an extinct species of sea snail, a marine gastropod mollusk in the family Drilliidae.

== Distribution ==
This extinct marine species was found France.
