= Pleurofusia =

Scientific classification
- Kingdom: Animalia
- Phylum: Mollusca
- Class: Gastropoda
- Subclass: Caenogastropoda
- Order: Neogastropoda
- Superfamily: Conoidea
- Family: Drilliidae
- Genus: †Pleurofusia de Gregorio, 1890

Type species
- † Pleurotoma longirostropsis de Gregorio, 1890

Species
- See text

Synonyms
- † Pleurotoma (Pleurofusia) de Gregorio, 1890; † Surcula (Pleurofusia) (de Gregorio, 1890); † Turricula (Pleurofusia) (de Gregorio, 1890)

Extinct genus of gastropods

Pleurofusia is an extinct genus of sea snails, marine gastropod molluscs in the family Drilliidae.

== Species ==
Species within the genus Pleurofusia include:

- † Pleurofusia crassinoda (Des Moulins, 1842)
- † Pleurofusia dowlingi Petuch 1997
- † Pleurofusia feddeni Noetling 1895
- † Pleurofusia fluctuosa Harris 1937
- † Pleurofusia fusus Vredenburg 1921
- † Pleurofusia longirostropsis (de Gregorio, 1890)
- † Pleurofusia paulensis Lozouet, 2015
- † Pleurofusia phasma Vredenburg 1921
- † Pleurofusia pseudocrassinoda Lozouet, 2015
- † Pleurofusia pseudosubtilis (Peyrot, 1931)
- † Pleurofusia scala Vredenburg 1921
- † Pleurofusia tauzini Lozouet, 2015
