= Pleurofusia fluctuosa =

Scientific classification
- Kingdom: Animalia
- Phylum: Mollusca
- Class: Gastropoda
- Subclass: Caenogastropoda
- Order: Neogastropoda
- Superfamily: Conoidea
- Family: Drilliidae
- Genus: †Pleurofusia
- Species: †P. fluctuosa

Binomial name
- †Pleurofusia fluctuosa Harris 1937

Extinct species of gastropod

Pleurofusia fluctuosa is an extinct species of sea snail, a marine gastropod mollusk in the family Drilliidae.

== Distribution ==
This extinct marine species was found in Eocene strata of Louisiana and Mississippi, USA; age range: 40.4 to 37.2 Ma.
