= Turbonilla major =

Scientific classification
- Kingdom: Animalia
- Phylum: Mollusca
- Class: Gastropoda
- Family: Pyramidellidae
- Genus: Turbonilla
- Species: T. major

Binomial name
- Turbonilla major (C.B. Adams, 1852)

Synonyms
- Chemnitzia major C.B. Adams, 1852 (basionym)

Species of gastropod

Turbonilla major is a species of sea snail, a marine gastropod mollusk in the family Pyramidellidae, the pyrams and their allies.

== Description ==
The shell has an elongate-conic shape. Its length measures .39 inch. The teleoconch contains 15 whorls that are moderately convex and are marked by a well impressed suture. On each whorl there are about 24 stout, obtuse approximate ribs which are obsolete anteriorly. The shell shows finely impressed spiral striae over all the surface except the summit of the ribs. The outlines of the spire are rectilinear. The aperture is subovate. The outer lip is thin. The columella is straight.

== Distribution ==
This species occurs in the Pacific Ocean off Panama.
