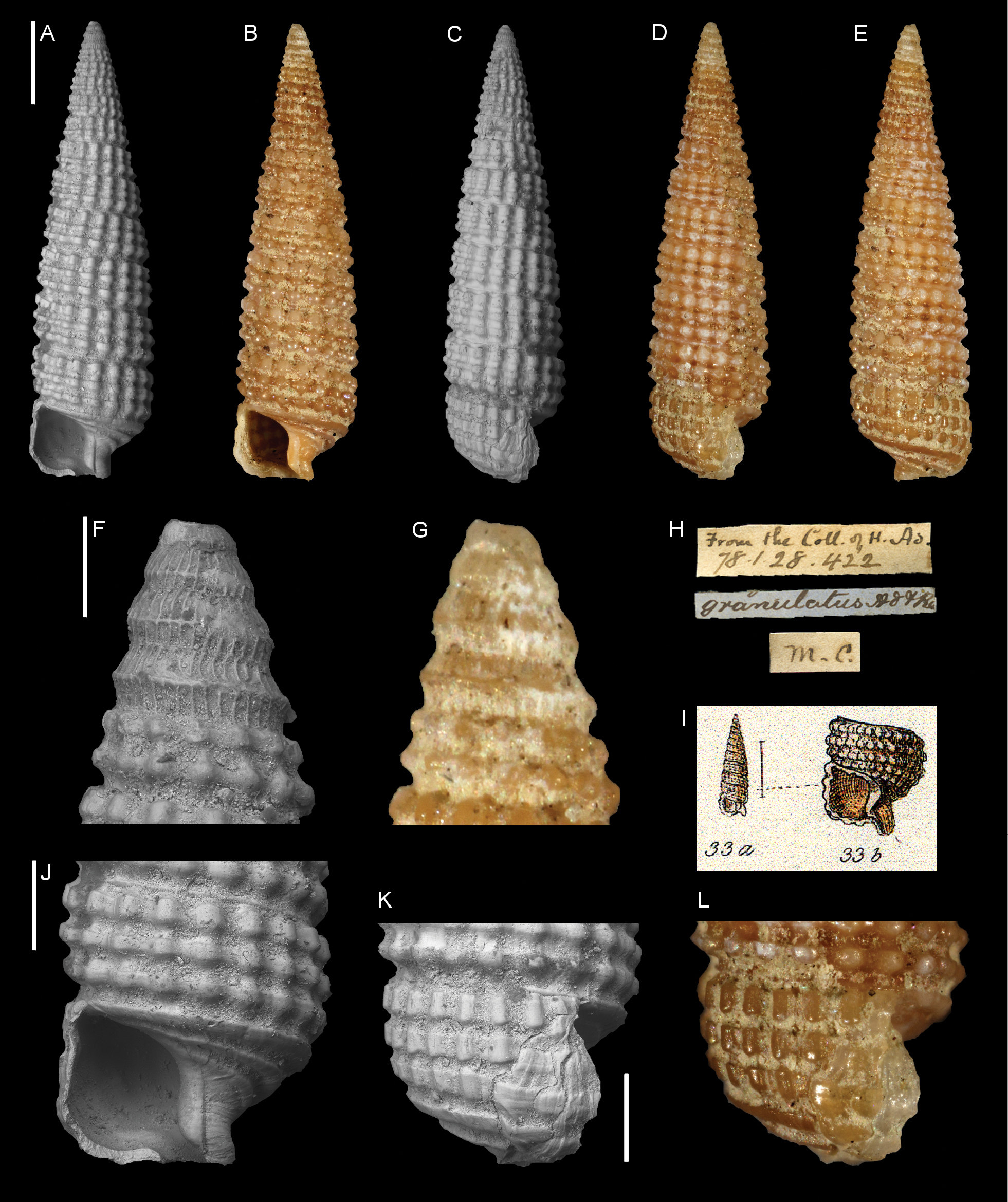
- Shells of Triphora sp.

Scientific classification
- Kingdom: Animalia
- Phylum: Mollusca
- Class: Gastropoda
- Subclass: Caenogastropoda
- Order: incertae sedis
- Superfamily: Triphoroidea
- Family: Triphoridae
- Genus: Triphora; Blainville, 1828

Synonyms
- Cerithium (Triforis) Deshayes, 1834; Cerithium (Triphoris); Trifora (invalid subsequent spelling of Triphora Blainville, 1828); Triforis Deshayes, 1834 (invalid subsequent spelling of Triphora Blainville, 1828); Triphoris Deshayes, 1830 (invalid subsequent spelling of Triphora Blainville, 1828); Triphorus Tryon, 1872 (misspelling of Triphora)

= Triphora (gastropod) =

Genus of gastropods

Triphora is a genus of very small sea snails, marine gastropod molluscs in the subfamily Triphorinae of the family Triphoridae.

The genus was named by Blainville in 1828, and the type species is Triphora gemmata Blainville, 1828. Like most of the other genera in this family, the shells of species in this genus are extremely high-spired with sculptural decoration, and are sinistral (left-handed) in coiling.

== Nomenclature ==
Species that were named in combination with Triphoris, Triforis, or Trifora, which are variant spellings of Triphora, and have not been placed elsewhere in the literature are listed here under Triphora. In such cases, where the original genus is a misspelling or emendation of the current genus, the authors and dates have not been placed in parentheses (ICZN Article 51.3.1). For Triforis of authors, see Trituba and related genera in Newtoniellidae.

== Species ==
There are well over 300 species in this genus.

- Triphora abacoensis Rolán & Redfern, 2008
- Triphora abrupta (Dall, 1881)
- Triphora acicula Issel, 1869
- Triphora acuta (Kiener, 1841)
- Triphora adamsi Bartsch, 1907
- Triphora aequatorialis Thiele, 1925
- Triphora aethiopica Thiele, 1925
- Triphora affinis Hinds, 1843
- † Triphora affinis Deshayes, 1865 (invalid, junior primary homonym of T. affinis Hinds, 1843)
- Triphora africana Bartsch, 1915
- Triphora agulhasensis Thiele, 1925
- Triphora albanoi Bakker & Swinnen, 2021
- Triphora alboapicata Thiele, 1930
- Triphora alexandri Tomlin, 1931
- Triphora alternata C. B. Adams, 1852
- † Triphora ambigua Deshayes, 1864
- Triphora amicorum Rolán & Fernández-Garcés, 2008
- Triphora amoena Hervier, 1898
- Triphora angustissima Deshayes, 1863
- † Triphora antwerpiensis Marquet, 1996
- Triphora aporema Rehder, 1980
- Triphora armandoi Espinosa & Ortea, 2020
- Triphora arrondoi Fernández-Garcés, Rolán & Espinosa, 2020
- † Triphora aspera Deshayes, 1864
- Triphora atea Bartsch, 1915
- Triphora atlantica E. A. Smith, 1890
- Triphora atomus Issel, 1869
- Triphora aurea Hervier, 1897
- Triphora axialis Barnard, 1963 (taxon inquirendum)
- † Triphora bacillus Deshayes, 1864
- Triphora bactron Barnard, 1963
- Triphora bacula Barnard, 1963
- † Triphora bantamensis Oostingh, 1933
- † Triphora bartschi Olsson, 1916
- Triphora barnardi Tomlin, 1945
- Triphora bathyraphe E. A. Smith, 1890
- † Triphora benoisti Cossmann, 1906
- Triphora bicincta Odhner, 1917
- Triphora bicolor Pease, 1868
- † Triphora bigranosa Koenen, 1891
- † Triphora bilineata O. Meyer, 1886
- † Triphora biplicata Rouault, 1848
- † Triphora borealis (Kautsky, 1925)
- † Triphora brevicula Cossmann, 1889
- Triphora brevis Thiele, 1925: synonym of Triphora sabita Bartsch, 1915
- † Triphora bruguieri (Michelotti, 1847)
- Triphora brunnea Pease, 1871
- Triphora brunnescens Thiele, 1930
- Triphora burnupi E.A. Smith, 1910
- † Triphora buscheri Landau, Ceulemans & Van Dingenen, 2018
- Triphora callipyrgus Bartsch, 1907
- Triphora calva Faber & Moolenbeek, 1991
- Triphora candida Hinds, 1843
- Triphora capensis Bartsch, 1915
- † Triphora caribbeana Weisbord, 1962 †
- Triphora caracca Dall, 1927 : synonym of Monophorus caracca (Dall, 1927)
- Triphora carpenteri Bartsch, 1907
- Triphora castaneofusca Thiele, 1930
- Triphora catalinensis Bartsch, 1907
- Triphora cerea E. A. Smith, 1906
- Triphora chamberlini F. Baker, 1926
- Triphora charybdis Fernandes & Pimenta, 2015
- Triphora chathamensis Bartsch, 1907
- † Triphora chauvereauensis Landau, Ceulemans & Van Dingenen, 2018
- Triphora chrysolitha Kay, 1979
- † Triphora cincta Kaunhowen, 1898
- † Triphora clarae O. Boettger, 1902
- Triphora clio Hedley, 1899
- Triphora coelebs Hinds, 1843
- Triphora coetiviensis Melvill, 1909
- Triphora collaris Hinds, 1843
- Triphora concatenata Melvill, 1904
- Triphora concinna Hinds, 1843
- † Triphora conoidalis Rouault, 1848
- Triphora contrerasi F. Baker, 1926
- Triphora convexa E. A. Smith, 1904
- Triphora cookeana Baker & Spicer, 1935
- Triphora cornuta Hervier, 1898
- Triphora costata Pease, 1871
- † Triphora costulata Deshayes, 1864
- † Triphora crassicrenata Cossmann & Pissarro, 1901
- Triphora cylindrella Dall, 1881
- Triphora cylindrica Pease, 1871
- Triphora dagama Barnard, 1963
- Triphora dalli Bartsch, 1907
- Triphora dealbata (C. B. Adams, 1850)
- Triphora delicatula Thiele, 1912
- Triphora dilecta Thiele, 1925
- † Triphora diozodes Cossmann, 1889
- Triphora distincta Deshayes, 1863
- Triphora dives Thiele, 1925
- Triphora earlei Kay, 1979
- Triphora ellyae De Jong & Coomans, 1988
- Triphora elsa Bartsch, 1915
- Triphora elvirae De Jong & Coomans, 1988
- Triphora escondidensis F. Baker, 1926
- Triphora eucharis Rehder, 1980
- Triphora evermanni F. Baker, 1926
- Triphora excellens E. A. Smith, 1903
- Triphora excolpus Bartsch, 1907
- Triphora exilis Dunker, 1860
- Triphora exomilisca Rehder, 1980
- † Triphora fernandezgarcesi Landau, Ceulemans & Van Dingenen, 2018
- † Triphora fontasensis Doncieux, 1908
- Triphora farquhari Tomlin, 1932
- Triphora formosa Deshayes, 1863
- † Triphora fossilis Willett, 1937
- Triphora fucata Pease, 1861
- Triphora fulvescens Hervier, 1898
- Triphora fuscomaculata (Sowerby III, 1904)
- Triphora fuscozonata (Sowerby III, 1907)
- Triphora galapagensis Bartsch, 1907
- Triphora gemmata Blainville, 1828
- † Triphora gortanii Selli, 1974
- Triphora goubini Hervier, 1898
- Triphora gracilior E. A. Smith, 1903
- Triphora granulifera Jousseaume, 1884
- Triphora grayii Hinds, 1843
- Triphora grenadensis Rolán & Lee, 2008
- Triphora guadaloupensis Rolán & Fernández-Garcés, 2008
- † Triphora guttata Guppy, 1867
- † Triphora gymna Cossmann, 1919
- Triphora hannai F. Baker, 1926
- Triphora harrisi Baker & Spicer, 1935
- Triphora hebes (Watson, 1880)
- Triphora helena Bartsch, 1915
- Triphora hemileuca Tomlin, 1931
- Triphora hemphilli Bartsch, 1907
- † Triphora herouvallensis de Raincourt, 1877
- † Triphora hildeverti Doncieux, 1908
- Triphora hircus Dall, 1881
- Triphora idonea Melvill & Standen, 1901
- Triphora ignobilis Thiele, 1925
- † Triphora imperatrix O. Boettger, 1902
- † Triphora inaequipartita Deshayes, 1866
- Triphora inclara Kosuge, 1974
- Triphora incolumis Melvill, 1918
- Triphora inconspicua C. B. Adams, 1852
- Triphora interpres Melvill, 1918
- † Triphora inversa (Lamarck, 1804)
- Triphora isleana Velain, 1878
- Triphora johnstoni F. Baker, 1926
- † Triphora kanakoffi Willett, 1948
- Triphora keiki Kay, 1979
- Triphora laddi Kay, 1979
- Triphora lamyi Selli, 1973
- Triphora leucathema Rehder, 1980
- † Triphora lherbettorum Landau, Ceulemans & Van Dingenen, 2018
- Triphora lilaceocincta E. A. Smith, 1903
- Triphora lilacina (Dall, 1889)
- Triphora loisae Rehder, 1980
- † Triphora longissima Doncieux, 1908
- Triphora loyaltiensis Hervier, 1898
- Triphora madgei Viader, 1938
- Triphora madria Bartsch, 1915
- † Triphora major O. Meyer, 1886
- † Triphora malayana P. J. Fischer, 1921
- Triphora marmorata Hinds, 1843: synonym of Euthymella flammulata (Pease, 1861)
- Triphora marshi Strong & Hertlein, 1939
- Triphora martii Rolán & Fernández-Garcés, 1995
- Triphora medinae Parodiz, 1955
- Triphora melantera Hervier, 1898
- † Triphora meridionalis O. Meyer, 1886
- Triphora metcalfeii Hinds, 1843
- Triphora milda Bartsch, 1915
- † Triphora minuata Deshayes, 1864
- † Triphora miopygmaea Landau, Ceulemans & Van Dingenen, 2018
- Triphora mirifica Deshayes, 1863
- † Triphora mitella Dall, 1892
- Triphora monteiroi Rolán & Fernández-Garcés, 2015
- Triphora montereyensis Bartsch, 1907
- Triphora morgani Barnard, 1963
- Triphora natalensis Barnard, 1963
- Triphora nina Bartsch, 1915
- Triphora nivea Verco, 1909
- Triphora nodifera A. Adams & Reeve, 1850
- † Triphora nodosoplicata Benoist, 1873
- Triphora oreada Bartsch, 1915
- Triphora osclausum Rolán & Fernández-Garcés, 1995
- Triphora oweni F. Baker, 1926
- Triphora palmeri Strong & Hertlein, 1939
- Triphora panamensis Bartsch, 1907
- † Triphora papaveracea Benoist, 1873
- † Triphora passyi Deshayes, 1864
- Triphora patricia Thiele, 1925
- Triphora pazensis F. Baker, 1926
- Triphora pedroana (Bartsch, 1907)
- Triphora peninsularis Bartsch, 1907
- † Triphora peyreirensis Cossmann & Peyrot, 1921
- † Triphora pezanti Cossmann, 1913
- † Triphora plesiomorpha Cossmann & Pissarro, 1901
- Triphora plebeja Thiele, 1925
- Triphora portoricensis Rolán & Redfern, 2008
- † Triphora praelonga Koenen, 1891
- Triphora pseudonovem Rolán & Lee, 2008
- Triphora pulchella A. Adams, 1854
- Triphora punctata Pease, 1871
- Triphora pupaeformis (Deshayes, 1863)
- Triphora pura E. A. Smith, 1903
- Triphora pusilla (Pfeiffer, 1840)
- Triphora pustulosa Pease, 1871
- Triphora pyrrha (Henderson & Bartsch, 1914)
- † Triphora radiospirata Marquet, 1996
- † Triphora rakhiensis Eames, 1952
- Triphora recta E. A. Smith, 1890
- Triphora regia Thiele, 1925
- † Triphora regina O. Boettger, 1902
- † Triphora richei Doncieux, 1908
- Triphora robusta Pease, 1871
- Triphora rufotincta(Kosuge, 1963)
- Triphora rushii Dall, 1889
- Triphora sabita Bartsch, 1915
- † Triphora sancticlementensis Landau, Ceulemans & Van Dingenen, 2018
- Triphora scala Barnard, 1963
- Triphora sceptrum Thiele, 1925
- Triphora schmidti Schepman, 1909
- † Triphora sculptata Cossmann & Pissarro, 1901
- Triphora scylla Fernandes & Pimenta, 2015
- Triphora shepstonensis E. A. Smith, 1906
- † Triphora similis O. Meyer, 1886
- † Triphora singularis Deshayes, 1866
- † Triphora sinistrorsa (Deshayes, 1833)
- Triphora slevini F. Baker, 1926
- Triphora smithi Bartsch, 1915
- † Triphora staadti Cossmann, 1907
- Triphora stearnsi Bartsch, 1907
- Triphora stephensi Baker & Spicer, 1935
- † Triphora subcalcarea Oostingh, 1941
- Triphora subulata Thiele, 1930
- † Triphora sulcata Tenison Woods, 1878
- Triphora sulcosa Pease, 1871
- Triphora superba Thiele, 1925
- Triphora suturalis A. Adams & Reeve, 1850
- Triphora taeniolata Hervier, 1898
- † Triphora taurorara Sacco, 1895
- † Triphora terebrata Heilprin, 1887
- Triphora thaanumi Kay, 1979
- † Triphora tricarinata Meunier, 1880
- † Triphora tricornuta Cossmann & Pissarro, 1901
- † Triphora tricostata Szőts, 1953
- Triphora tristis Hinds, 1843
- Triphora tuberculata Pease, 1871
- Triphora tubifera Thiele, 1925
- Triphora turtlebayensis Rolán & Lee, 2008
- Triphora vanduzeei F. Baker, 1926
- Triphora vargasi Rehder, 1980
- Triphora vestalis A. Adams, 1854
- Triphora virginalis Thiele, 1925
- † Triphora washingtoniana Dickerson, 1915
- Triphora yociusi Rolán & Lee, 2008
