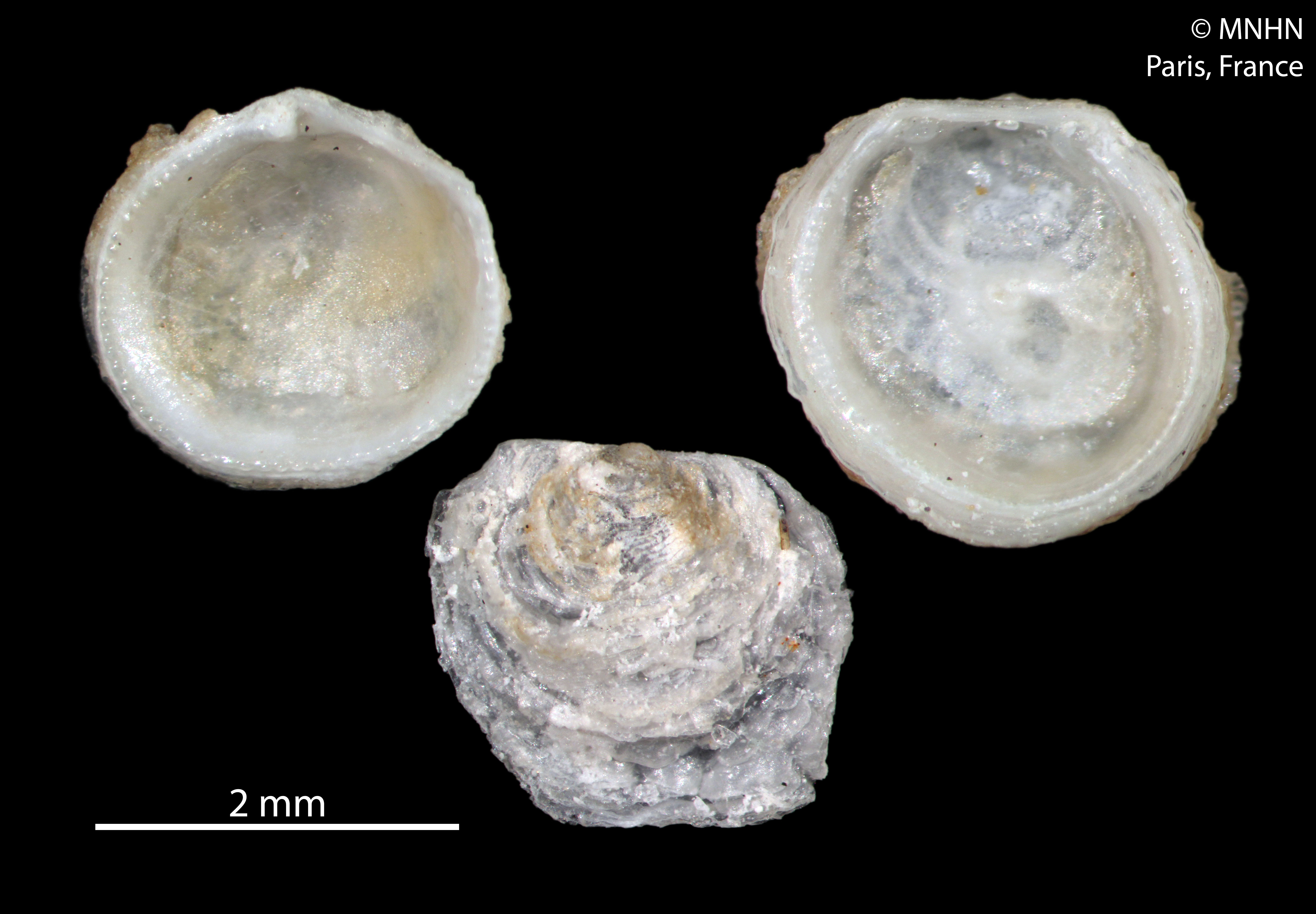
- Shell of Dimyella starcki (paratype at MNHN, Paris)

Scientific classification
- Kingdom: Animalia
- Phylum: Mollusca
- Class: Bivalvia
- Order: Pectinida
- Superfamily: Dimyoidea; Fischer, 1887
- Family: Dimyidae; Fischer, 1887

Genera
- See text

= Dimyidae =

Family of bivalves

Dimyidae is a family of extremely flattened, small (<1 cm), pleurothetic, relatively rare marine bivalve molluscs in the order Pectinida inhabiting the deeper regions of continental shelves from the Caribbean to Japan. They are sometimes called dimyarian oysters. Unlike other ostreids, the dimyarian oysters attach themselves to a substrate via their right (rather than left) valves. They are related to the scallops and other oysters.

Dimyidae species live in deep sea areas, often on rocks and the sea floor. Their habitat examines how solid surfaces like rocks allow them to avoid being swept away, and the low-profile shell combined with the deep sea habitat protects them from predators.

== Genera ==
Genera within Dimyidae include:

- Basiliomya Bayer 1971
  - Basiliomya goreaui F. M. Bayer, 1971
- Dimya Roualt 1848
- Dimyella Moore 1969
  - Dimyella starcki D. R. Moore, 1969
