= Dimya =

Scientific classification
- Kingdom: Animalia
- Phylum: Mollusca
- Class: Bivalvia
- Order: Pectinida
- Family: Dimyidae
- Genus: Dimya; Ronault, 1850

Species
- See text

Genus of bivalves

Dimya is a genus of very small clams, marine bivalve molluscs in the family Dimyidae.

== Species within the genus Dimya ==
- Dimya acuminata Esteves, 1984
- Dimya adaia
- Dimya affinis Reeve, 1858
- Dimya argentata
- Dimya argentea Dall, 1886 - silver dimyid
- Dimya californiana - California dimyid
- Dimya coralliotis - coral dimyid
- Dimya corrugata Hedley
- Dimya filipina
- Dimya lima
- Dimya japonica
- Dimya maoria Powell, 1937
- Dimya melleni
- Dimya mimula
- Dimya molokaia
- Dimya rakhiensis
- Dimya rufaripa
- Dimya sigillata
- Dimya spondyliformis
- Dimya tigrina Bayer, 1971
