= Pleurofusia longirostropsis =

Scientific classification
- Kingdom: Animalia
- Phylum: Mollusca
- Class: Gastropoda
- Subclass: Caenogastropoda
- Order: Neogastropoda
- Superfamily: Conoidea
- Family: Drilliidae
- Genus: †Pleurofusia
- Species: †P. longirostropsis

Binomial name
- †Pleurofusia longirostropsis (de Gregorio, 1890)

Synonyms
- † Pleurotoma longirostropsis de Gregorio, 1890 † (original combination); † Pleurotoma (Pleurofusia) longirostropsis de Gregorio 1890

Extinct species of gastropod

Pleurofusia longirostropsis is an extinct species of sea snail, a marine gastropod mollusk in the family Drilliidae. Fossils found in Oligocene strata of present-day Mississippi date from 33.9 to 28.4 million years ago.
