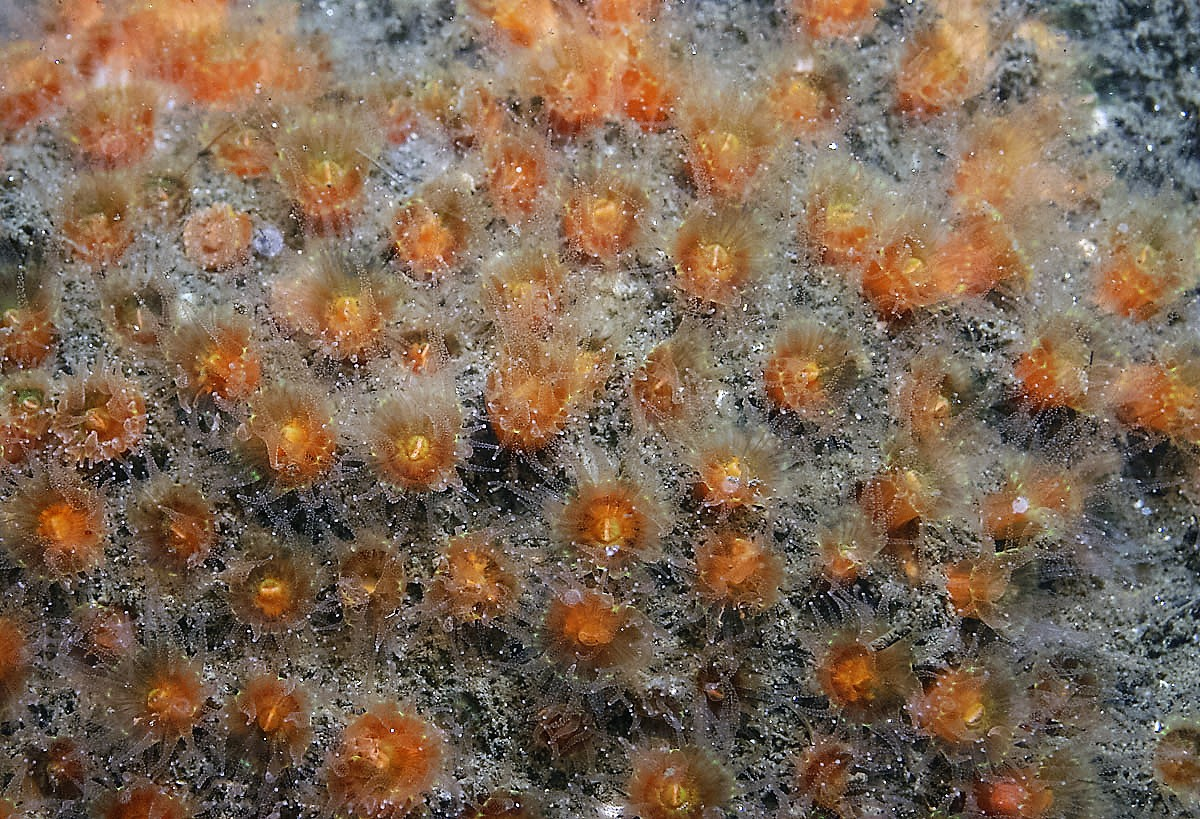

Scientific classification
- Domain: Eukaryota
- Kingdom: Animalia
- Phylum: Cnidaria
- Class: Hexacorallia
- Order: Scleractinia
- Family: Rhizangiidae
- Genus: Astrangia
- Species: A. haimei

Binomial name
- Astrangia haimei Verrill, 1866

Synonyms
- List: Astrangia caboensis Durham, 1947; Astrangia concepcionensis Durham, 1947; Astrangia concinna Verrill, 1866; Astrangia coronadosensis Durham, 1947; Astrangia cortezi Durham & Barnard, 1952; Astrangia hancocki Durham & Barnrad, 1952; Astrangia insignifica Ricketts & Calvin, 1939; Astrangia lajollaensis Durham, 1947; Astrangia oaxacensis Palmer, 1928; Astrangia pedersenii Verrill, 1870; Astrangia pulchella Verrill, 1866; Astrangia sanfelipensis Durham & Barnard, 1952; Astrangia santelmoensis Durham, 1947

= Astrangia haimei =

Species of coral

Astrangia haimei, commonly known as the aggregating cup coral or Haime's cup coral, is a species of stony coral in the family Rhizangiidae.

== Distribution and habitat ==
Astrangia haimei occurs in the Eastern Pacific Ocean. A relatively uncommon species, Haime's cup coral is most frequently observed along the coast from Monterey Bay, California, through the Gulf of California and the Baja California peninsula. However, as this species was first described on the Pacific coast of Panama in 1866, its total range likely extends much further south; perhaps as far as Peru.

A. haimei inhabits depths from sea level to at least 53 m (174 ft), typically dwelling on vertical rock faces with moderate to high water flow. Though typically subtidal, it may be observed in the low intertidal zone.

== Description ==
Haime's cup coral is an aggregating coral, consisting of colonies of several small (2.5–3 mm (0.098–0.118 in) in diameter), corallite-secreting polyps. The corallites are cylindrical in shape, typically 2–3.81 mm (0.079–0.150 in) in height, and can each extend more than 6.35 mm (0.250 in) above the basal mural expansion which connects the polyps. The corallites are relatively distant from one another, spaced (1–6.35 mm (0.039–0.250 in)) apart. The column and oral disc are typically orange in color, but darker shades of brown are not unusual. The tentacles of the polyps are translucent and end in a white, spherical tip. When an individual's tentacles are withdrawn, the cup shape of the corallite, as well as the simple, radiating ridges of its septa, become more apparent.

== Ecology ==
Astrangia haimei reproduces via stolons, like other members of the family Rhizangiidae. Like other polyp-form members of the phylum Cnidaria, Haimei's cup coral is a sessile organism, relying on underwater currents to carry edible plankton within reach of its sticky, stinging tentacles.
