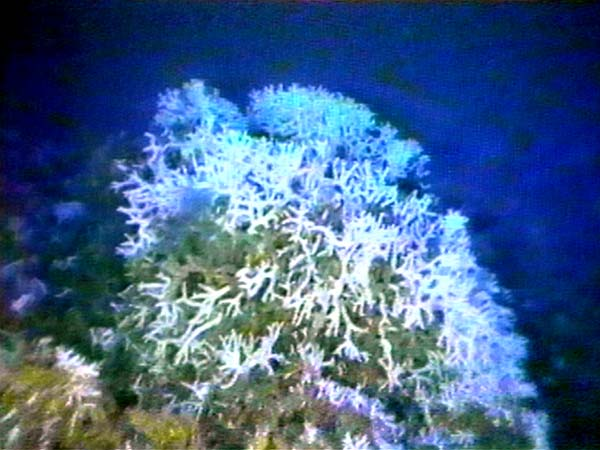

Conservation status
- Least Concern (IUCN 3.1)

- Vulnerable (NatureServe)

Scientific classification
- Kingdom: Animalia
- Phylum: Cnidaria
- Subphylum: Anthozoa
- Class: Hexacorallia
- Order: Scleractinia
- Family: Oculinidae
- Genus: Oculina
- Species: O. varicosa

Binomial name
- Oculina varicosa Le Sueur, 1820

Synonyms
- Oculina varicosa var. conigera Verrill, 1902

= Ivory bush coral =

Species of cnidarian

Oculina varicosa, or the ivory bush coral, is a scleractinian deep-water coral primarily found at depths of 70-100m, and ranges from Bermuda and Cape Hatteras to the Gulf of Mexico and the Caribbean. Oculina varicosa flourishes at the Oculina Bank off the east coast of Florida, where coral thickets house a variety of marine organisms. The U.S. National Marine Fisheries Service considers Oculina a genus of concern, due to the threat of rapid ocean warming. Species of concern are those species about which the U.S. Government's National Oceanic and Atmospheric Administration (NOAA), National Marine Fisheries Service, has some concerns regarding status and threats, but for which insufficient information is available to indicate a need to list the species under the U.S. Endangered Species Act (ESA). While Oculina is considered a more robust genus in comparison to tropical corals, rising ocean temperatures continue to threaten coral health across the planet.

== Species description ==
Oculina varicosa grows in arborescent branches, typically about 1 to 2 meters tall. polyps wrap around the coral branches and extend when feeding to provide Oculina with essential nutrients from various forms of plankton and algae. O. varicosa has widely spaced, distinct corallites, approximately 3 millimeters in diameter. While O. varicosa most often exists as an aposymbiotic coral (without symbionts), it can also exist with symbiotic algae which helps provide another food source. Symbiotic Oculina colonies with zooxanthellae generally come in various shades of brown, while azooxanthellate corals tend to have a lighter, whiter appearance. Corals usually receive their brilliant color from their symbionts, so aposymbiotic colonies tend to lack bright colors.

== Ecology ==
Coral growth usually relies on both food and sunlight, but because O. varicosa exists primarily as a deep-water coral, it typically lacks zooxanthellae. Only shallow water forms of O. varicosa contain zooxanthellae because they have more access to sunlight. Zooxanthellae, or coral symbionts, serve in a mutualistic relationship as a source of energy for coral colonies, while also receiving shelter between coral polyps. Zooxanthellae photosynthesize and transfer sugars to the coral polyp, but azooxanthellate, or aposymbiotic, coral colonies rely on obtaining energy through heterotrophy. Coral polyps snatch planktonic matter out of the water column in order to produce energy for growth. Surprisingly, corals have mouths and stomachs to digest the food they catch with their tentacles. Coral heterotrophy is more nutrient dependent, while photosynthesizing symbiotic corals are more dependent on sunlight.

Although O. varicosa is not considered a reef-building coral, it still serves an important role in creating larval habitat for native fish and invertebrates. Oculina provides a base for hard-bottom communities in supporting valuable fisheries species and a variety of other economically important organisms.

== Habitat ==
While O. varicosa does exist in both shallow waters (6 meters) and deep water, at depths of greater than 100 meters, it almost exclusively thrives on the Oculina Bank off the coast of Florida. Oculina coral reefs off Florida have been identified as essential fish habitat for federally managed species. The Experimental Oculina Research Reserve preserves the Oculina Banks, a reef of Oculina varicosa existing between 70 and 100 meters depth, and spanning 130 nautical miles, approximately 15 miles off the coast of Daytona Beach. Because symbionts only coexist with Oculina in shallow water conditions, this excludes aposymbiotic colonies on the Oculina Bank. At this location, O. varicosa branches grow into massive thickets and can reach up to 2 meters in height. Tree-like colonies on the Oculina Bank create an ideal place for a diverse population of fish and invertebrates to thrive. More than 70 species of fish and over 380 invertebrates call the Oculina Bank their home. A variety of grouper species are known to spend much of their juvenile stages hiding in the branches of Oculina; namely, gag, scamp, speckled hind, yellowedge and snowy grouper. Discovered in 1975, the Bank became a protected area by 1984 as the Oculina Bank Habitat Area of Particular Concern. The known and documented threat in the Oculina Banks area is damage from mechanical fishing gear, including dredges, bottom long lines, trawl nets and anchors despite supposed habitat-based protections. Anchoring vessels and bottom-trending fishing gear became prohibited within the protected area, in an effort to maintain the Oculina thickets and the habitat as a whole.

Temperature ranges from 7 to 27 degrees Celsius on the Oculina Bank. Such seasonal extremes effectively accustom Oculina varicosa to wide temperature shifts. This temperature resilience indicates that O. varicosa may be more apt to survive despite rising global ocean temperatures. Temperate corals, such as Oculina arbuscula and Astrangia poculata, show relatively high tolerance to ocean warming because of these large seasonal shifts. During upwelling events at the Oculina Bank, temperatures can settle around 7 degrees Celsius for days at a time.

== Research ==
Because the genus Oculina is considered one of the more resilient corals on the spectrum, it functions as a useful experimental subject, especially in the context of global climate change. Both cold and heat stress treatments on temperate corals serve as an important stepping stone in effectively dissecting coral health in response to rising ocean temperatures. Researching the effects of temperature stress on O. varicosa furthers understanding of how both this species and the hard bottom communities it helps form, will change under warmer oceans.
