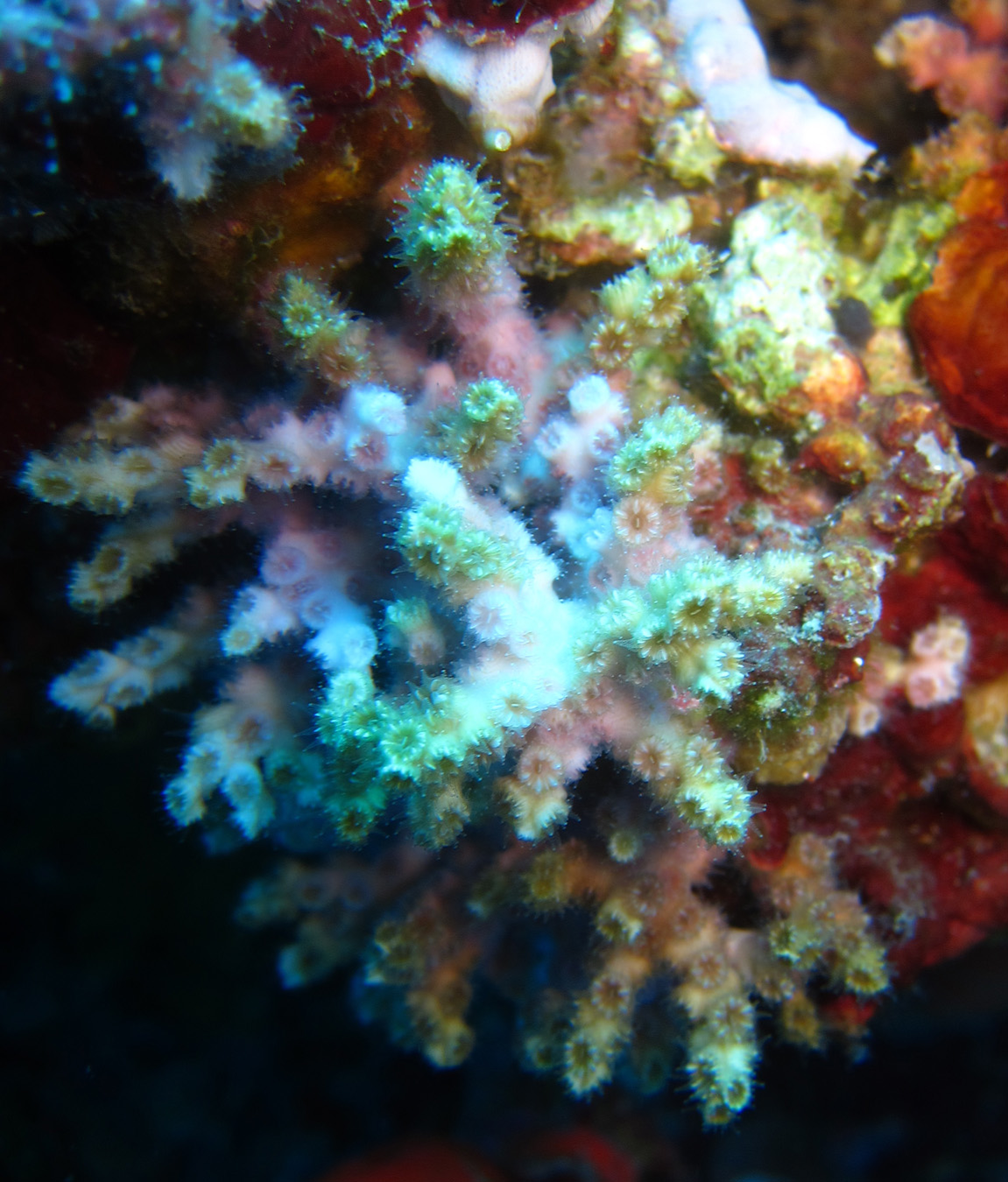

Conservation status
- Least Concern (IUCN 3.1)

Scientific classification
- Kingdom: Animalia
- Phylum: Cnidaria
- Subphylum: Anthozoa
- Class: Hexacorallia
- Order: Scleractinia
- Family: Oculinidae
- Genus: Oculina
- Species: O. diffusa

Binomial name
- Oculina diffusa Lamarck, 1816

Synonyms
- Madrepora virginea Lamarck, 1816

= Oculina diffusa =

Species of cnidarian

Oculina diffusa, commonly known as the diffuse ivory bush coral or ivory tree coral, is found in the eastern Atlantic Ocean, the Gulf of Mexico, and the Caribbean Sea. It is found in shallow water, usually down to 3 metres (9.8 ft) deep but occasionally as deep as 20 metres (66 ft). Its colonies are dense and have a yellow-brown color. It favours areas with high amounts of sedimentation.

== Physical appearance ==
Colonies of Oculina diffusa are usually about 30 centimetres (12 in) in diameter and have twisting narrow branches less than half an inch in diameter. Colonies have been recorded at temperatures ranging from 13–31 degrees Celsius.

== Food ==
Oculina diffusa normally eat plankton and small fish, though some have also been known to filter feed on tiny particles in the water.

== Reproduction ==
Oculina diffusa reproduces sexually by broadcast spawning. In shallow water, this is believed to occur between July and August, and during September in deeper water. After being planktonic, the larva sinks to the bottom where it grows into a polyp. This produces buds asexually and develops into a colony.
