= Michael C. Barnette =

American underwater diver, writer and founder of the Association of Underwater Explorers

Michael C. Barnette is an American diver, author, photographer and founder of the Association of Underwater Explorers.

== Background and personal life ==
Barnette was born in September 1971 in Fredericksburg, VA. In 1989, he graduated from Stafford Senior High School. Then, he attended the University of South Carolina, graduating in 1995 with a degree in Marine Biology. Barnette is married and currently resides in Saint Petersburg, FL.

== Career ==
Barnette works for the NOAA's National Marine Fisheries Service as a marine biologist. His current duties include protecting sea turtles by making sure fishing fleets worldwide are utilizing turtle excluder devices. Barnette was made a fellow of The Explorers Club in March 2009.

== Association of Underwater Explorers ==
Barnette has been actively diving and researching shipwrecks since 1990, resulting in the identification of over 30 wreck sites. In 1996, Barnette founded the Association of Underwater Explorers (AUE), an organization dedicated to expanding understanding of submerged cultural resources.

=== Expeditions and projects ===
In 2005 Barnette participated in the recovery of a B-25c Mitchell bomber from Lake Murray (South Carolina), working with divers from AUE, the Rubicon Foundation, and Woodville Karst Plain Project under Explorers Club flag number 103. This bomber had been ditched in the lake on April 4, 1943, and remained 45 meters (148 ft) below the surface for 60 years. The recovery effort was headed by Dr. Robert Seigler and supervised by Gary Larkins of the Air Pirates. The project was documented by the History Channel and televised on their show Mega Movers. The plane is now being preserved by the Southern Museum of Flight in Birmingham, Alabama.

A year later, in 2006, Barnette was part of the History Channel's expedition to HMHS Britannic led by explorers John Chatterton and Richie Kohler. Titanic's Achilles Heel was the first documentary to be released from this expedition, on June 17, 2007. The documentary Titanic's Tragic Sister also featured details from this expedition, and first aired on October 14, 2007.

Barnette's recovery of Oculina varicosa from the Gulf of Mexico in 2006 allowed researchers to confirm its existence as a species of concern in abundance in the Gulf. In 2009, Barnette returned to collect coral samples for testing that identified the species as genetically identical to Oculina varicosa found off the eastern coast of Florida.

When the Eagle's Nest cave system needed new guidelines in 2007 Barnette and AUE took on the task of replacing the old line as well as removing unnecessary lines.

In January 2020 Barnette, along with fellow explorers, discovered what they believed to be a 95-year-old ship, the SS Cotopaxi, which had disappeared near the Bermuda Triangle in 1925. The boat had departed from Charleston, South Carolina, carrying 32 passengers and never made it to its final destination, Havana, Cuba. Barnette sought help from historians and researchers to ensure that it was the SS Cotopaxi. In doing so, he learned that the ship had sent a distress signal two days into its voyage from a location that aligns with where the wreckage was found. The discovery was featured on a February episode of Shipwreck Secrets, a Science Channel series. In 2020, he identified the wreck of the Sandra, which was reported lost in the Bermuda Triangle in April 1950; the discovery was featured in the History Channel documentary "History's Greatest Mysteries: Expedition Bermuda Triangle." Barnette has been featured in multiple television documentaries on shipwrecks associated with the Bermuda Triangle that have aired on The Discovery Channel, National Geographic, History Channel, and The Learning Channel.

=== Shipwreck identification ===
Barnette has been active in the identification of numerous shipwrecks that include:

- The steamer Arratoon Apcar
- The yacht Esmeralda
- The tug Gwalia
- The tanker Joseph M Cudhay
- The steamer Leif Eriksson
- The tanker Munger T. Ball
- The luxury yacht Nohab (ex Lensahn (III))
- The tanker Papoose
- The steamer Peconic
- The tug Point Chicot
- The Queen of Nassau
- The tanker San Delfino
- The schooner barge Vitric
- The freighter Cotopaxi
- U.S. Coast Guard Albatross #1240
- The tanker W.E. Hutton
- The steamer Valley City
- The paddle steamer Idaho
- The steamer Munisla
- The freighter Holstein
- The tanker Pan Massachusetts
- The sailboat Kringeline
- The freighter Sandra

== Publications ==
=== Books ===
- Barnette, Michael C. (2003). Shipwrecks of the Sunshine State: Florida's Submerged History. Association of Underwater Explorers. ISBN 0-9743036-0-7. Archived from the original on February 19, 2009.
- Barnette, Michael C. (2008). Florida's Shipwrecks. Arcadia Publishing. ISBN 978-0-7385-5413-6.
- Barnette, Michael C. (2010). Encyclopedia of Florida Shipwrecks: Volume I, Atlantic Coast. Association of Underwater Explorers. ISBN 978-0-9743036-1-1.

=== Articles ===
- Barnette, Michael C. (2002). "M/S Rhein". Advanced Diver Magazine (9).
- Barnette, Michael C. (2002). "Looking Deeper Into the Florida Keys". Advanced Diver Magazine (10). Archived from the original on May 18, 2009.
- Barnette, Michael C. (2003). "Looking for a Needle in a Sea of Haystacks". Divers (March–April).
- Barnette, Michael C. (2004). "Don't Like the Weather in Hatteras -- Just Wait an Hour: Murphy's Law and the Battleship Virginia" (PDF). Divers Ocean Planet (1).
- Barnette, Michael C. (2004). "German U-Boat Attacks Off Florida Coast". Wreck Diving Magazine (1). Archived from the original on May 18, 2009.
- Barnette, Michael C. (March 2004). "Two for the Price of One: Diving the RBJ". Florida Scuba News.
- Barnette, Michael C. "Identity Crisis - Finding a Name for the Middlegrounds Wreck". Advanced Diver Magazine (17). Archived from the original on May 18, 2009.
- Barnette, Michael C. "The Loss of the Holstein" (PDF). Advanced Diver Magazine (18).
- Barnette, Michael C. (2005). "But For a Single Wave: The tragic loss and recent identification of the steamship Peconic". Wreck Diving Magazine. Archived from the original on May 18, 2009.
- Barnette, Michael C. (2006). "Observations of the deep-water coral Oculina varicosa in the Gulf of Mexico" (PDF). NOAA Technical Memorandum NMFS-SEFSC-535: 12.
- Barnette, Michael C. (2006). "Florida Shipwrecks: Fishing for History: Thousands of wrecks, thousands of fishing spots and countless fascinating tales". FloridaSportsman.com. Archived from the original on August 2, 2009.
- Barnette, Michael C. (2006). "Scrambled History: A Tale of Four Misidentified Tankers" (PDF). Wreck Diving Magazine. Archived from the original (PDF) on September 28, 2007.
- Barnette, Michael C. (2009). "U-2513: The First True Modern Submarine". Advanced Diver Magazine (29).

== See also ==
- USS Narcissus (1863)
- Oculina varicosa
