= Aposymbiosis =

Symbiotic organisms living apart from one another

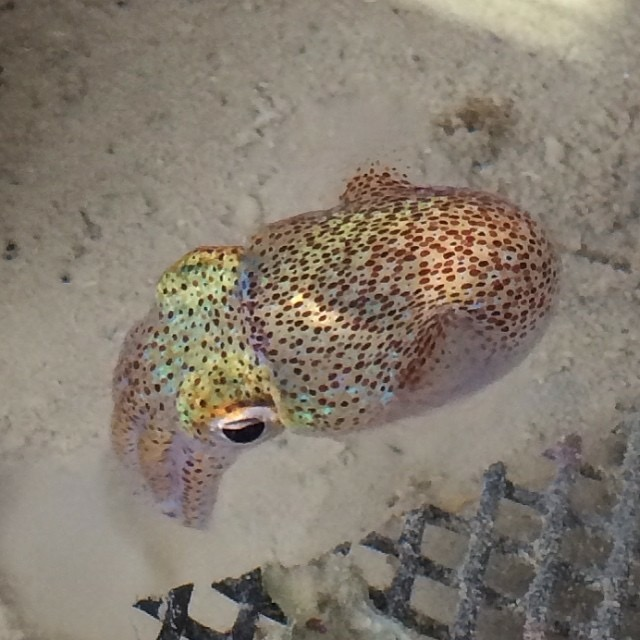
The Hawaiian bobtail squid uses its bacterial symbionts to evade predators.

Aposymbiosis occurs when symbiotic organisms live apart from one another (for example, a clownfish living independently of a sea anemone). Studies have shown that the lifecycles of both the host and the symbiont are affected in some way, usually negative, and that for obligate symbiosis the effects can be drastic. Aposymbiosis is distinct from exsymbiosis, which occurs when organisms are recently separated from a symbiotic association. Because symbionts can be vertically transmitted from parent to offspring or horizontally transmitted from the environment, the presence of an aposymbiotic state suggests that transmission of the symbiont is horizontal. A classical example of a symbiotic relationship with an aposymbiotic state is the Hawaiian bobtail squid Euprymna scolopes and the bioluminescent bacterium Aliivibrio fischeri. While the nocturnal squid hunts, the bacteria emit light of similar intensity of the moon which camouflages the squid from predators. Juveniles are colonized within hours of hatching and Aliivibrio must outcompete other bacteria in the seawater through a system of recognition and infection.

== Use in Research ==
Aposymbiotic organisms can be used as models to observe a variety of processes in the fields of ecology, medicine, and beyond.

=== Ecology ===
Aposymbiotic Euprymna juveniles have been studied throughout colonization in order to determine the system of recognizing and recruiting Vibrio fischeri in seawater. More specifically, these squids secrete chitin-containing mucus that simultaneously attracts and traps Vibrio fischeri. This mucus also contains antimicrobial peptides that selectively kill other bacterial species, ensuring the survival of V. fischeri. Once a stable bacterial population is reached, V. fischeri activates genes required for bioluminescence. These complex relationships help scientists gain insight into host-microbe recognition, which has potential applications in immunology and other microbiome studies.

Tropical coral polyps without their symbiont algae are models for coral calcification and the effects of the algae on coral pH regulation. Many tropical coral species survive as a result of their mutualistic relationships with zooxanthellae. These photosynthetic dinoflagellates live in coral tissues, providing the energy needed for calcification. In acidic or heat-stressed environments, these algae die, resulting in a phenomenon known as coral bleaching. This research has a wide variety of applications ranging from coral reef conservation to better understanding the implications of climate change on keystone species such as corals. Recent research using aposymbiotic Astrangia poculata colonies has revealed distinct gene expression patterns under heat and cold stress, helping distinguish host-driven environmental stress responses from those influenced by symbiotic algae.

In temperate coral systems, such as in Astrangia poculata or Oculina arbuscula, the term aposymbiotic is defined as the host living functionally without symbionts (in contrast to asymbiotic, which is reserved for coral colonies with zero symbiotic cells within tissue). These corals can switch between symbiosis and aposymbiosis depending on environmental conditions such as temperature and light availability. Their ability to grow and survive without their symbionts makes them a valuable model for studying coral resilience and symbiotic flexibility.

Another example in class Insecta is the relationship between Wolbachia bacteria and Asobara tabida wasps. Without these endosymbiotic bacteria, the female wasps' ovaries degenerate, preventing egg development and leaving them sterile. Understanding the role of Wolbachia in insect reproduction can aid in the development of new pest biocontrol methods and help researchers better understand the evolution of endosymbiotic dependence. Since arthropod infection with Wolbachia causes sterility, this relationship is also being studied to potentially inhibit the transmission of various vector-borne diseases.

In green peach aphids (Myzus persicae), removal of their endosymbiotic bacteria Buchnera aphidicola alters feeding behavior and delays host plant acceptance. Aposymbiotic aphids exhibited increased pathway activity and mechanical difficulties during probing, which affected their ability to access plant phloem.

Aposymbiosis has also been experimentally studied in plants. In the wild yam Dioscorea sansibarensis, researchers successfully generated aposymbiotic plants by removing their leaf-associated bacteria Orrella dioscoreae. These plants developed normally but exhibited structural changes in leaf glands, offering a new model system for hereditary symbioses in plants.

=== Medicine ===
Women who are aposymbiotic for certain Lactobacillus species are more susceptible to urinary tract infections and bacterial vaginosis. Since Lactobacilli help maintain a healthy microbiome, their absence allows other harmful bacterial species to grow without competition. Subsequently, these Lactobacilli are of interest for use as a probiotic alternative to antibiotics. When consumed in adequate amounts, this therapeutic could potentially help prevent genitourinary infections in aposymbiotic women.

Aposymbiotic vectors, especially insects, have been used to study disease transmission. Furthermore, aposymbiotic and dysbiotic vectors are being engineered to change the rate and efficiency of disease transmission.
