= Astrangia solitaria =

Scientific classification
- Kingdom: Animalia
- Phylum: Cnidaria
- Subphylum: Anthozoa
- Class: Hexacorallia
- Order: Scleractinia
- Family: Rhizangiidae
- Genus: Astrangia
- Species: A. solitaria

Binomial name
- Astrangia solitaria (Lesueur, 1817)

Synonyms
- List: Astrangia brasiliensis Vaughan, 1906; Astrangia epithecata Duncan, 1876; Astrangia granulata Duchassaing & Michelotti, 1860; Astrangia minuta Duncan, 1876; Astrangia neglecta Duchassaing & Michelotti, 1860; Astrangia solitaria portoricensis Vaughan, 1901; Caryophyllia solitaria Leseuer, 1817

Species of coral

Astrangia solitaria, the dwarf cup coral or southern cup coral, is a species of stony coral in the family Rhizangiidae. It is native to shallow water in the western Atlantic Ocean and the Caribbean Sea.

== Description ==
A colony of Astrangia solitaria consists of a small number of cylindrical corallites (stony cups), 4 to 6 mm (0.16 to 0.24 in) in diameter and 4 to 8 mm (0.16 to 0.31 in) high, each secreted by the polyp that sits inside it. New polyps grow on short stolons and the coenosarc (soft tissue) does not cover the skeleton in a continuous sheet as it does in most coral species. The stolons may become abraded leaving the individual polyps completely or semi-separated. The corallites can have 48 septa (stony ridges) but 36 is a more usual number. The septa of adjoining corallites are connected by wide, flat, granular costae (ridges). The colour of this coral is usually pale brown, but the corallites may have brown extremities and white bases, or even be completely white. A. solitaria can be confused with the northern cup coral (Astrangia poculata) but that species usually forms clumps with more numerous, smaller corallites. A. poculata often contains symbiotic zooxanthellae in its tissues while A. solitaria does not.

== Distribution and habitat ==
Astrangia solitaria is found down to depths of about 40 m (131 ft) in the western Atlantic Ocean and Caribbean Sea, including Florida, the Bahamas, the Gulf of Mexico, Mexico, Costa Rica, Panama, Colombia, Venezuela and Belize. It is found on hard surfaces including coral rubble and the underside of plate corals. This coral is found in sheltered shallow water but on a particular stretch of coast on Grand Cayman, a large onshore boulder was found to harbour the remains of numerous colonies of A. solitaria that were carbon-dated to an age of six hundred years. This boulder was likely shifted onshore by a hurricane three hundred and thirty years ago, an event which would have resulted in the death of the corals.
