= Schizoculina =

Scientific classification
- Kingdom: Animalia
- Phylum: Cnidaria
- Subphylum: Anthozoa
- Class: Hexacorallia
- Order: Scleractinia
- Family: Oculinidae
- Genus: Schizoculina; Wells, 1937

Species
- See text

Genus of corals

Schizoculina is a genus of reef-building stony corals in the family Oculinidae.

== Species ==
The following species are included in the genus according to the World Register of Marine Species:

- Schizoculina africana (Thiel, 1928)
- Schizoculina fissipara (Milne Edwards & Haime, 1850)
