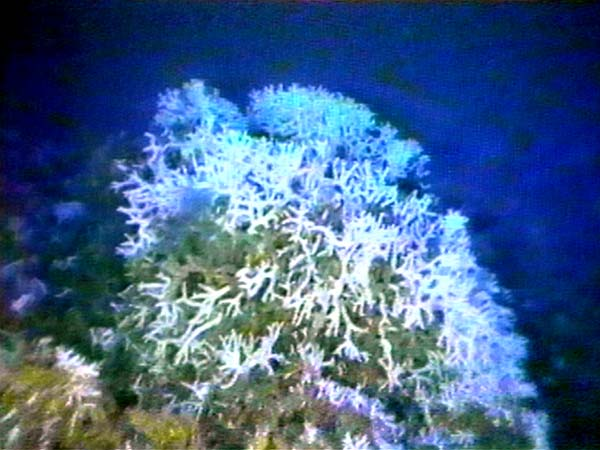
- Oculina varicosa

Scientific classification
- Kingdom: Animalia
- Phylum: Cnidaria
- Subphylum: Anthozoa
- Class: Hexacorallia
- Order: Scleractinia
- Family: Oculinidae
- Genus: Oculina; Lamarck, 1816

Species
- See text

= Oculina =

Genus of corals

Oculina is a genus of colonial stony coral in the family Oculinidae. These corals are mostly found in the Caribbean Sea, the Gulf of Mexico and Bermuda but some species occur in the eastern Pacific Ocean. They occur at depths down to 1000 metres.

== Description ==
The colonies of Oculina have a straggly branching structure and are mostly pale yellow. The branches are slim, not exceeding 1 centimetre (0.4 in) in diameter. The corallites which house the polyps are widely separated. Their walls are composed of fragile, solid-walled tubes. Each corallite has 12 primary septa with fine teeth which partially project from the corallite wall and which are larger than the intermediate septa. Some species contain symbiotic microalgae called zooxanthellae.

== Species ==
The World Register of Marine Species lists the following species:

- Oculina arbuscula Agassiz, 1864
- Oculina diffusa Lamarck, 1816 - zooxanthellate
- †Oculina halensis Duncan, 1864
- Oculina patagonica de Angelis, 1908 - zooxanthellate
- Oculina profunda Cairns, 1991
- Oculina robusta Pourtalès, 1871 Robust ivory tree coral - zooxanthellate
- Oculina tenella Pourtalès, 1871
- †Oculina umbellata Dennant, 1904
- Oculina valenciennesi Milne Edwards & Haime, 1850 - zooxanthellate
- Oculina varicosa Lesueur, 1821 Ivory bush coral - zooxanthellate
- Oculina virgosa Squires, 1958
