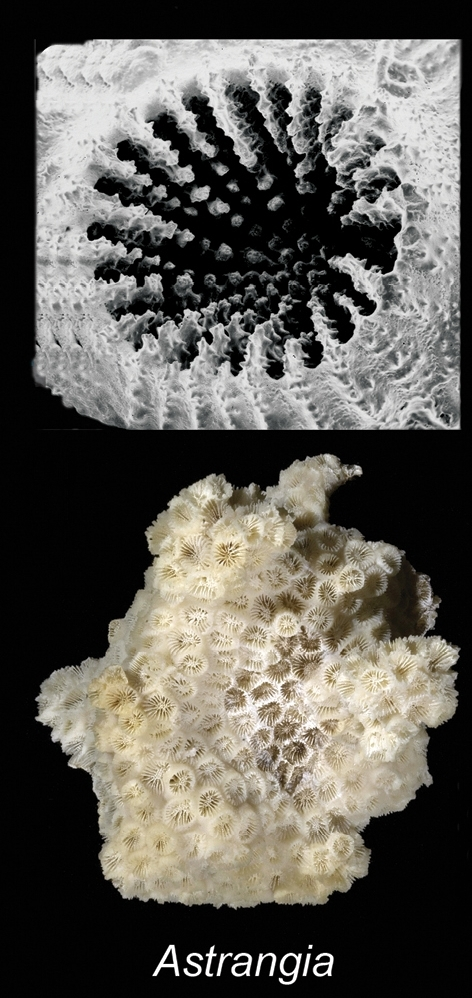

Conservation status
- Least Concern (IUCN 3.1)

Scientific classification
- Kingdom: Animalia
- Phylum: Cnidaria
- Subphylum: Anthozoa
- Class: Hexacorallia
- Order: Scleractinia
- Family: Rhizangiidae
- Genus: Astrangia
- Species: A. poculata

Binomial name
- Astrangia poculata (Ellis & Solander, 1786)

Synonyms
- List: Astrangia astreiformis Milne Edwards & Haime, 1849; Astrangia danae Milne Edwards & Haime, 1849; Astrangia danae Agassiz, 1850; Astrangia edwardsii Verrill, 1866; Astrangia michelinii Milne Edwards & Haime, 1848; Madrepora poculata Ellis & Solander, 1786

= Astrangia poculata =

Species of coral

Astrangia poculata, the northern star coral or northern cup coral, is a species of non-reefbuilding stony coral in the family Rhizangiidae. It is native to shallow water in the western Atlantic Ocean and the Caribbean Sea. The International Union for Conservation of Nature lists this coral as being of "least concern". Astrangia poculata is an emerging experimental and model organism for corals because it harbors a facultative photosymbiosis, is a calcifying coral, and has a large geographic range. Research on this emerging experimental system is showcased bi-annually by the Temperate Coral Research Working Group, collaboratively hosted by Roger Williams University, Tufts University, and Southern Connecticut State University

== Description ==
Astrangia poculata grows in small clumps that are up to 5 cm (2 in) across. The individual polyps are large and sit in stony cups known as corallites. The polyps are translucent and the colony has a furry appearance when they are expanded. In warm water and with high levels of light, this coral often houses photosynthesizing symbiotic protists known as zooxanthellae in its tissues, and then the coral appears brown. In cooler, or low-light conditions, the zooxanthellae may no longer be beneficial to the coral and may be expelled, causing the coral to appear pale in colour. It can be confused with the southern cup coral (Astrangia solitaria), but that species has a more southerly distribution, is generally brown, may be solitary, has larger corallites 4 mm (0.16 in) wide with 36 septa (stony ridges), and does not contain zooxanthellae.

The color of this coral species depends on the proportion of its individual polyps that are symbiotically housing zooxanthellae. The brown phenotype is mostly symbiotic, the variable phenotype has polyps with different levels of symbiosis, and the white, aposymbiotic, phenotype has functionally no symbionts. The aposymbiotic phenotype is not to be confused with the asymbiotic, which also appears white, but has absolutely no symbionts.

== Distribution and habitat ==
Astrangia poculata is native to the western Atlantic Ocean and Caribbean Sea where its range extends from Cape Cod in Massachusetts to the Gulf of Mexico. It also occurs on the western coast of Africa. It occurs in encrusting clumps on rocks and is common under ledges and boulders, on pilings and on wrecks. It also occurs in deep water and detached clumps sometimes get washed up on shore.

== Biology ==
Reproduction of Astrangia poculata takes place during the summer when eggs and sperm are liberated into the water column and fertilisation takes place. The embryos hatch into planula larvae which drift with the plankton before settling to the seabed and undergoing metamorphosis into polyps. Among zooxanthellate organisms, A. poculata is one of the few to have been studied with regard to the acquisition of zooxanthellae. It was found that there was no routine transfer of these symbionts from parent to offspring.

The polyps spread their tentacles to feed, gathering plankton and other food particles from the water passing by. The colony grows by budding, and in favorable conditions, the clump can grow at the rate of one new polyp every three days. In colder conditions it may stop growing and the coenosarc (soft tissues) may die back to some extent or lose symbionts via expulsion, rendering the stony skeleton prone to being fouled by other organisms and undergoing a winter quiescence. The base often hosts various boring or burrowing commensal invertebrates. Both temperature and symbiosis are known to influence the condition of the coral host, specifically with regards to wound-healing ability, but it is primarily season that drives microbiome structure in Rhode Island populations of the coral.

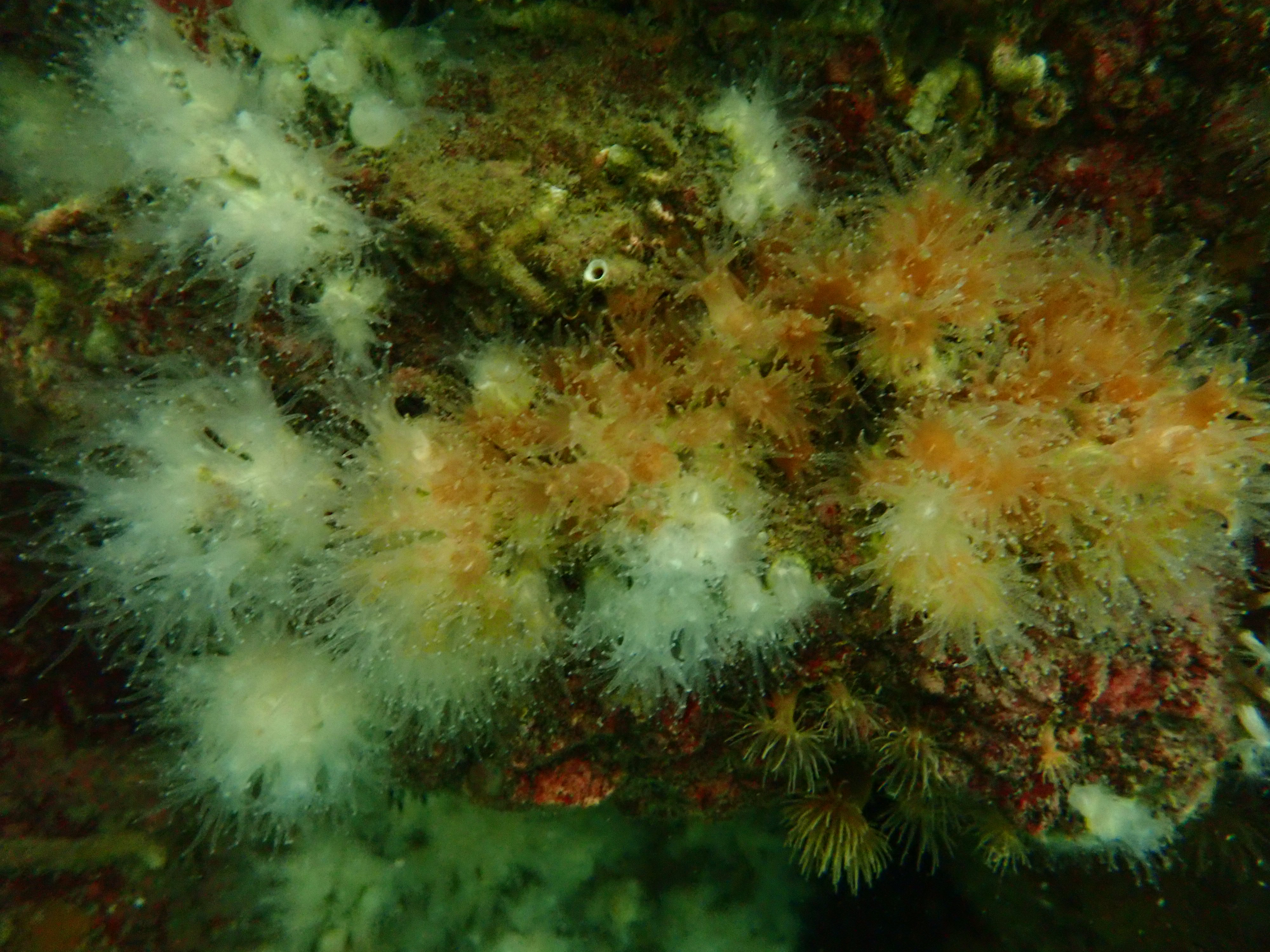
Astrangia poculata coral from Ft Wetherill, Rhode Island demonstrating facultative symbiosis

== Importance ==
In 2021, Astrangia poculata became the state coral of Rhode Island. This gives the coral a platform, enabling scientists to use it as an educational tool in conservation outreach and K-12 curriculum.
