= Florida's Shipwrecks =

Book by Michael C. Barnette

- Cover of Florida's Shipwrecks
- Author: Michael C. Barnette
- Language: English
- Publisher: Arcadia Publishing
- Publication date: 2008
- Publication place: United States
- Media type: Softback
- Pages: 127 pp
- ISBN: 978-0-7385-5413-6
- OCLC: 259716927
- LC Class: G525 .B266 2008

Florida's Shipwrecks is a 2008 history book by Michael C. Barnette about shipwrecks in the coastal waters of Florida. Barnette has been actively diving and researching shipwrecks for close to twenty years, and this has resulted in the identification of seventeen wreck sites. He applies this knowledge and passion for wrecks to this overview of shipwrecks around Florida. Barnette's "diligent research" details famous ship owners and those who used the ships. The photographs are a "truly amazing" collection of yachts and tankers in "their full glory" and before they sank below the surface.

The first chapter, "After the Storm", begins by reviewing shipwrecks left following the many hurricanes that have disrupted the shipping trade. The second chapter, "River of Gold", is an overview of the wrecks from Spanish treasure ships such as the Atocha. The third chapter, "Coursing waters", centers on wrecks from shipping that occurred before rail systems became popular for shipping. The fourth chapter, "Legacy of War", reviews wrecks that remained following the heavy German U-boat activity during World War II. The fifth chapter, "That Sinking Feeling", brings the reader to the modern wrecks reminding them of the unforgiving nature of the sea.

This book by Arcadia Publishing is another in their "Images of America" series.
