= Experimental Oculina Research Reserve =

Protected area off the coast of Florida, United States

- IUCN category Ia (strict nature reserve)
- Location within the United States
- Location: Florida, USA
- Nearest city: Fort Pierce, Florida
- Coordinates: 28°N 80°W
- Area: 1,030 km^{2} (400 sq mi)
- Established: June 27, 1994
- Governing body: National Oceanic and Atmospheric Administration

The Experimental Oculina Research Reserve preserves the Oculina Banks, a reef of ivory bush coral (Oculina varicosa) off the coast of Fort Pierce, Florida. Oculina varicosa is a U.S. National Marine Fisheries Service species of concern. Species of concern are those species about which the U.S. Government's National Oceanic and Atmospheric Administration (NOAA), National Marine Fisheries Service, has some concerns regarding status and threats, but for which insufficient information is available to indicate a need to list the species under the U.S. Endangered Species Act (ESA).

== Location ==
In 1984, a 92 square-nautical-mile (316 km^{2}) portion of these reefs was designated the Oculina Habitat Area of Particular Concern. In 1994, the area was closed to all manner of bottom fishing and was redesignated a research reserve. In 2000, the marine protected area was expanded to 300 square nautical miles (1,030 km^{2}) and prohibited all gears that caused mechanical disruption to the habitat.

== Conservation ==
Commercial and recreational harvesters heavily exploited reef fish, such as grouper and snapper, prior to the establishment of the reserve, and extensive areas of ivory bush coral habitat had been reduced to rubble by trawling or dredging, with few or no living coral colonies remaining in sections of the bank. Reef fish populations in the impacted areas have become sparse. The reserve is now undergoing habitat restoration projects.
