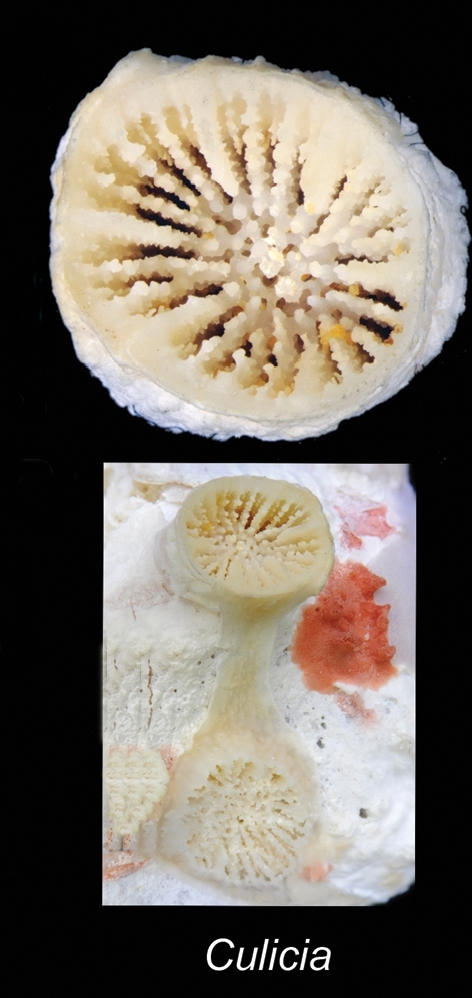
- Culicia stellata

Scientific classification
- Kingdom: Animalia
- Phylum: Cnidaria
- Subphylum: Anthozoa
- Class: Hexacorallia
- Order: Scleractinia
- Family: Rhizangiidae
- Genus: Culicia; Dana, 1846

= Culicia =

Genus of corals

Culicia is a genus of corals belonging to the family Rhizangiidae.

The genus has almost cosmopolitan distribution.

== Species ==
Species:

- Culicia australiensis Hoffmeister, 1933
- Culicia cuticulata Klunzinger, 1879
