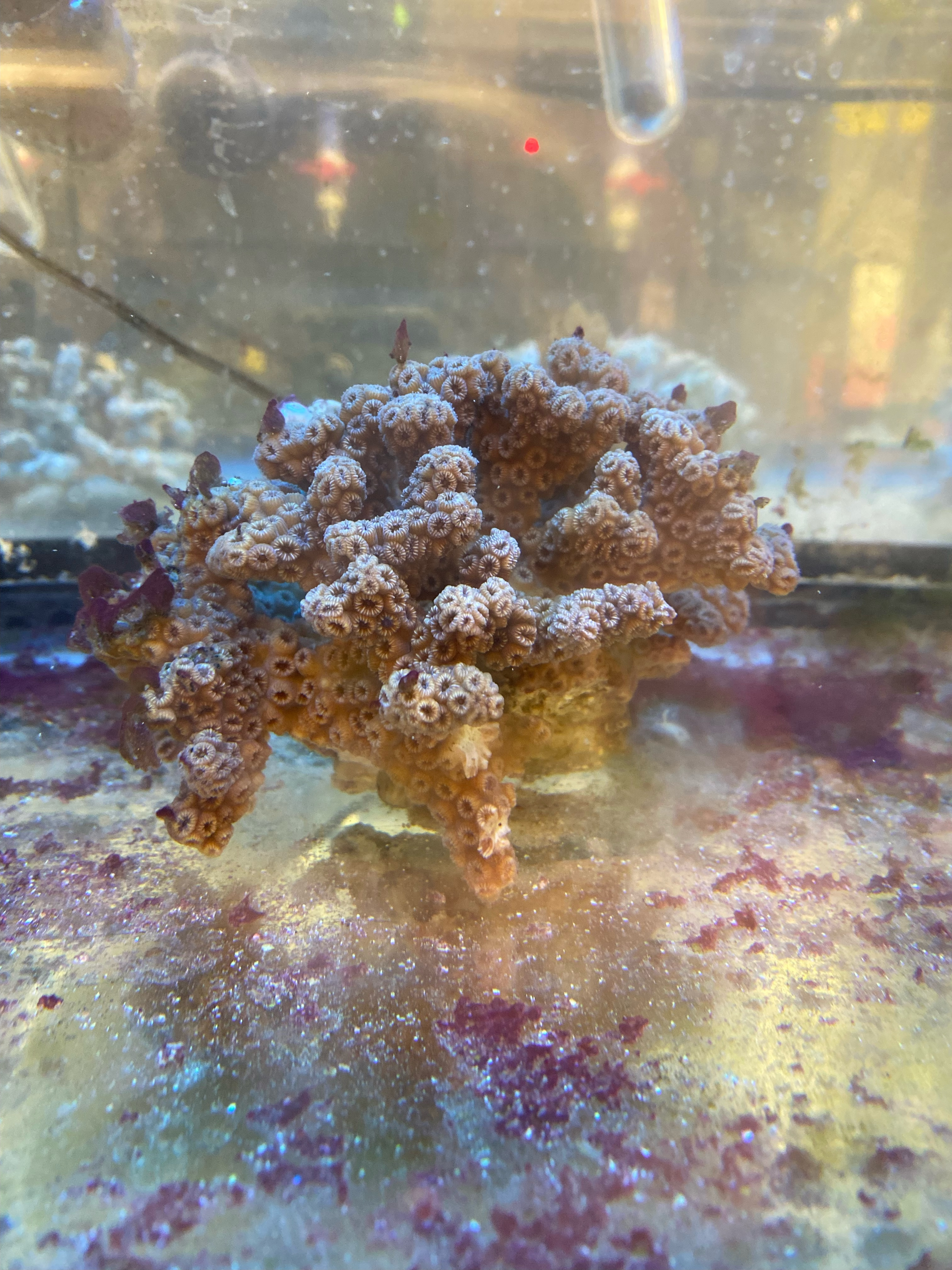
- Symbiotic Oculina arbuscula colony collected from Radio Island, NC, USA

Conservation status
- Least Concern (IUCN 3.1)

Scientific classification
- Kingdom: Animalia
- Phylum: Cnidaria
- Subphylum: Anthozoa
- Class: Hexacorallia
- Order: Scleractinia
- Family: Oculinidae
- Genus: Oculina
- Species: O. arbuscula

Binomial name
- Oculina arbuscula Agassiz, 1880

= Oculina arbuscula =

Species of branching temperate coral

Oculina arbuscula is a branching temperate coral found along the east coast of the United States from Florida to North Carolina. It has a facultative symbiosis with microalgae of the family Symbiodiniaceae. Unlike tropical corals, O. arbuscula can survive without its algal endosymbionts by switching to a predominantly heterotrophic feeding strategy. Symbiotic colonies are typically found in shallower waters due to light availability, whereas aposymbiotic (without symbionts) or mixed colonies are found as deep as 200m. The ability of O. arbuscula to exist in different symbiotic states makes it a good model system for studying the cnidarian-dinoflagellate symbiosis.

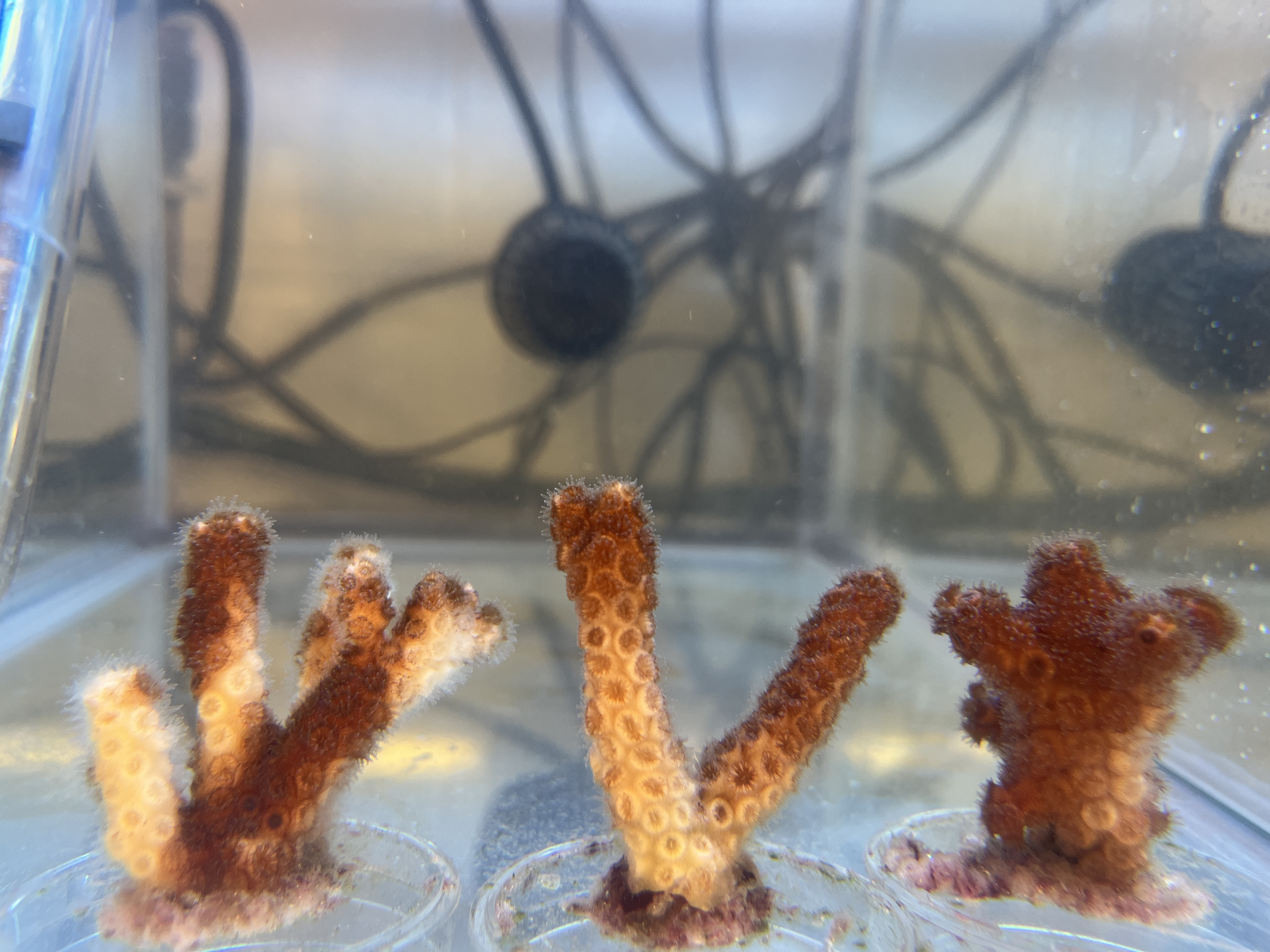
Oculina arbuscula fragments with mixed symbiotic states, collected from Radio Island, NC, USA

== Morphology ==
O. arbuscula forms colonies up to 0.5 meters in diameter with relatively short, stubby branches. Symbiotic colonies, depending on symbiont density, range from light to dark brown in color, whereas aposymbiotic colonies are white. Colonies with mixed symbiotic states are often seen, with some branches or parts of branches appearing brown and others white.

== Feeding strategy ==
In low light environments, O. arbuscula relies on filter feeding particles from the seawater as its primary trophic strategy, likely because maintaining algal symbionts is not energetically favorable in those environments. Symbiotic colonies will also filter feed; however, their primary source of nutrition is from photosynthates derived from their endosymbionts. O. arbuscula is generally a very hardy coral and can survive even when deprived of food and light for six weeks.

== Reproduction ==
Like most corals, O. arbuscula can reproduce both sexually and asexually by fragmentation. The reproductive biology of O. arbuscula has not been studied in detail, but it is suspected that this species is a gonochoric broadcast spawner due to its similarities to another species in the same genus, Oculina varicosa. The presence of larval recruitment throughout the year indicates that O. arbuscula is reproductively active year-round, unlike tropical corals that typically have one annual reproductive event.

== Symbiosis ==
The microbial community of O. arbuscula has not yet been characterized. However, it is known that the predominant and nearly exclusive algal symbiont species present in the tissue is Breviolum psygmophilum. As with tropical corals, this symbiosis is threatened by environmental stressors such as temperature and nutrients.
