= Schizoculina fissipara =

Conservation status
- Data Deficient (IUCN 3.1)

Scientific classification
- Kingdom: Animalia
- Phylum: Cnidaria
- Subphylum: Anthozoa
- Class: Hexacorallia
- Order: Scleractinia
- Family: Oculinidae
- Genus: Schizoculina
- Species: S. fissipara

Binomial name
- Schizoculina fissipara (Milne-Edwards & Haime, 1850)

Synonyms
- Oculina fissipara Milne Edwards & Haime, 1850

Species of coral

Schizoculina fissipara is a species of colonial stony coral in the family Oculinidae found in the eastern Atlantic Ocean on the western coast of Africa.

== Description ==
Schizoculina fissipara can have an upright growth habit or be encrusting, sometimes extending over 1 metre (3 ft 3 in). The upright branches are blueish grey or pale brown. The corallites which house the polyps are circular and up to 5 millimetres (0.20 in) in diameter. Sometimes several of them are linked in series. Schizoculina fissipara has a symbiotic relationship with zooxanthellae, microalgae that live within the tissue of the polyp.
