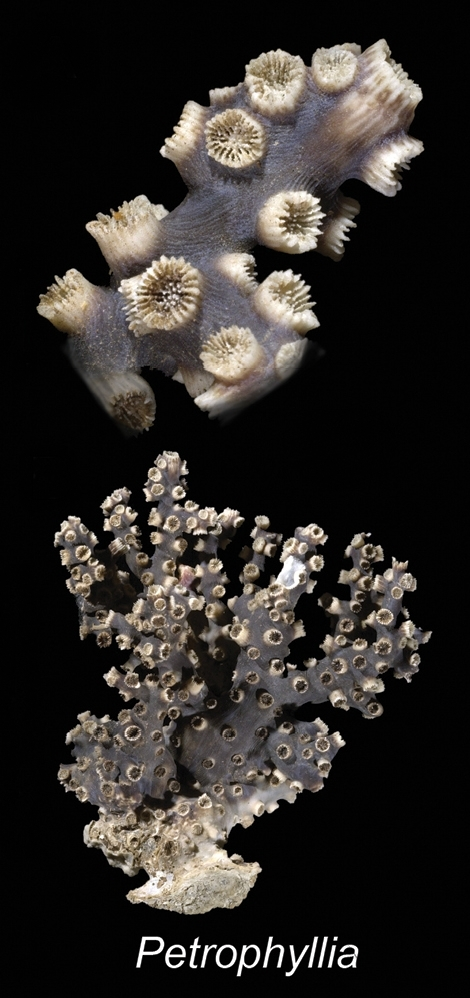
- Petrophyllia rediviva

Scientific classification
- Kingdom: Animalia
- Phylum: Cnidaria
- Subphylum: Anthozoa
- Class: Hexacorallia
- Order: Scleractinia
- Family: Oculinidae
- Genus: Petrophyllia; Conrad, 1855

= Petrophyllia =

Genus of corals

Petrophyllia is a genus of corals belonging to the family Oculinidae.

The species of this genus are found in Australia and Northern America.

== Species ==
- Petrophyllia arkensasensis (Conrad, 1855)
- Petrophyllia barbadiana (Wells, 1945)
- Petrophyllia crassiseptata Umbgrove, 1943
- Petrophyllia gardnerae (Vaughan, 1941)
- Petrophyllia niimiensis (Niko, Suzuki & Taguchi, 2017)
- Petrophyllia rediviva (Wells & Alderslade, 1979)
- Petrophyllia vernonensis (Vaughan, 1941)
