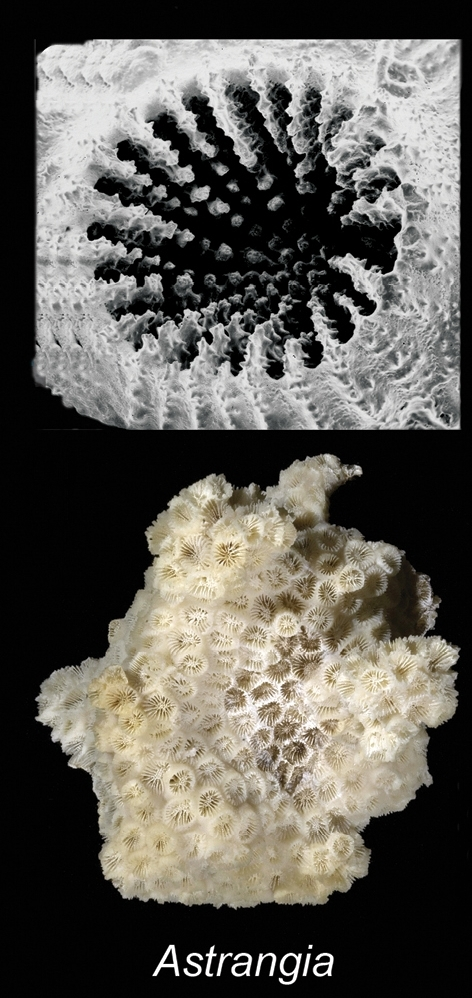
- Astrangia poculata

Scientific classification
- Kingdom: Animalia
- Phylum: Cnidaria
- Subphylum: Anthozoa
- Class: Hexacorallia
- Order: Scleractinia
- Family: Rhizangiidae
- Genus: Astrangia; Milne Edwards & Haime, 1848

Species
- See text

Synonyms
- Coenangia Verrill, 1870

= Astrangia =

Genus of corals

Astrangia is a genus of stony corals in the family Rhizangiidae. Members of this genus are non-reef building corals and are found in the Atlantic and Indo-Pacific Oceans. They are solitary corals with large polyps and are found in clumps. They reproduce from stolons. The corallites are small with simple toothed septa.

== Species ==
The World Register of Marine Species includes the following species in the genus:

- Astrangia atrata (Dennant, 1906)
- Astrangia browni Palmer, 1928
- Astrangia californica Durham & Barnard, 1952
- Astrangia conferta Verrill, 1870
- Astrangia costata Verrill, 1866
- Astrangia dentata Verrill, 1866
- Astrangia equatorialis Durham & Barnard, 1952
- Astrangia haimei Verrill, 1866
- Astrangia howardi Durham & Barnard, 1952
- Astrangia macrodentata Thiel, 1940
- Astrangia mercatoris Thiel, 1941
- Astrangia poculata (Ellis & Solander, 1786)
- Astrangia rathbuni Vaughan, 1906
- Astrangia solitaria (Lesueur, 1817)
- Astrangia woodsi Wells, 1955
