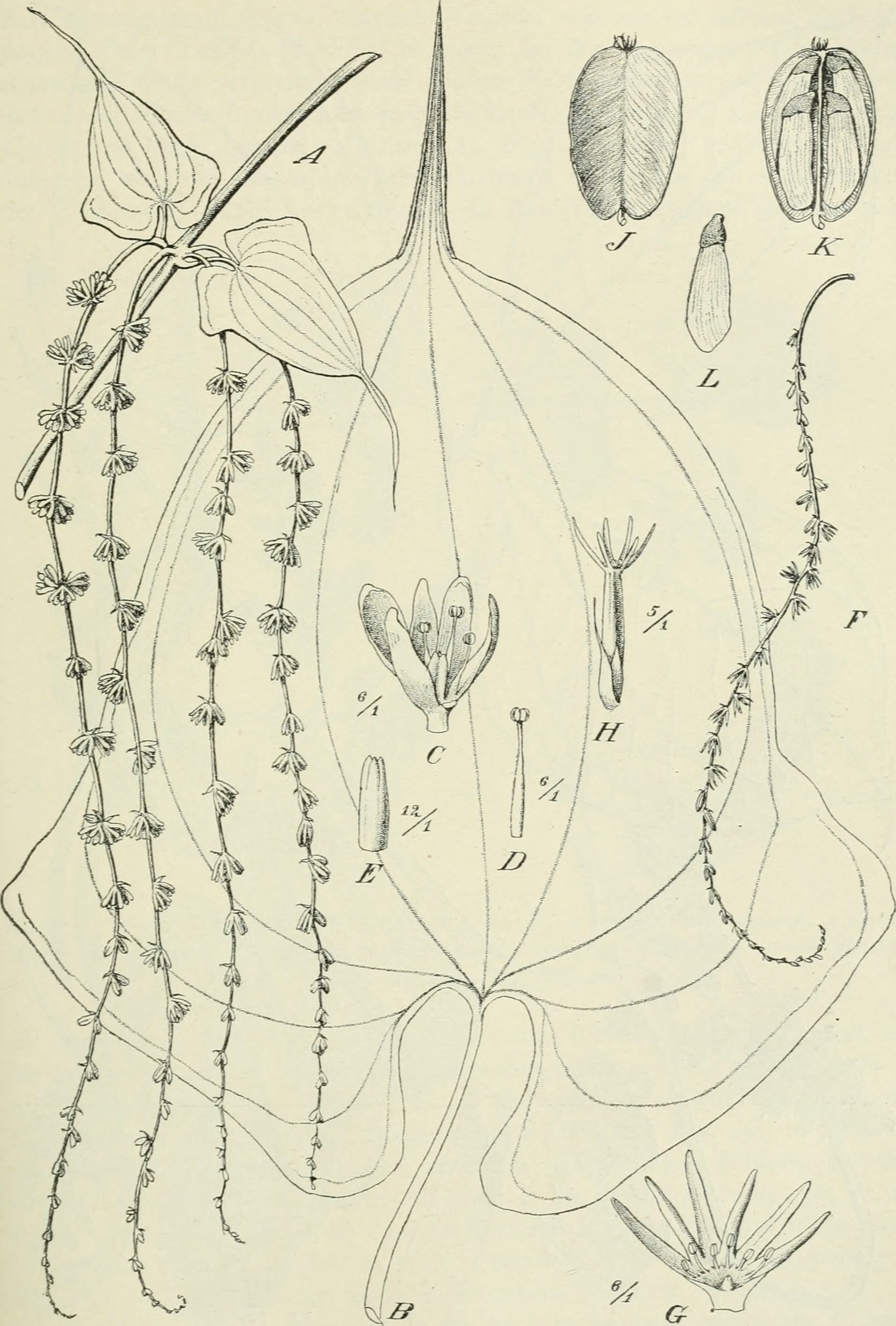

Scientific classification
- Kingdom: Plantae
- Clade: Tracheophytes
- Clade: Angiosperms
- Clade: Monocots
- Order: Dioscoreales
- Family: Dioscoreaceae
- Genus: Dioscorea
- Species: D. sansibarensis

Binomial name
- Dioscorea sansibarensis Pax

Synonyms
- Dioscorea toxicaria Bojer; Dioscorea macroura Harms; Dioscorea welwitschii Rendle; Dioscorea macabiha Jum. & H.Perrier

= Dioscorea sansibarensis =

Zanzibar yam

Species of herbaceous vine

Dioscorea sansibarensis is a species of flowering plant in the yam family known by the common name Zanzibar yam. It is native to Madagascar and to tropical Africa from Tanzania west to Guinea and south to Mozambique, and it is known elsewhere as an introduced species (including in southern Florida).

Dioscorea sansibarensis grows from a tuber up to 40 centimeters wide. The vine may exceed 7 meters in length and can be 3 centimeters wide. It twines counterclockwise and can reach and grasp supporting trees before it produces its first leaf. The heart-shaped leaves are up to 46 centimeters long by 58 wide. The tip may taper into a tail-like extension. The bulbils are up to 6 centimeters wide and may be purplish.

In parts of Africa this plant is thought to have magical properties. The tubers and bulbils are toxic.
