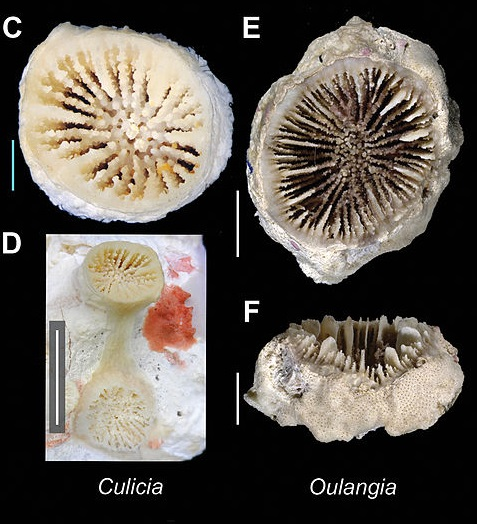
- Culicia and Oulangia

Scientific classification
- Kingdom: Animalia
- Phylum: Cnidaria
- Subphylum: Anthozoa
- Class: Hexacorallia
- Order: Scleractinia
- Family: Rhizangiidae d'Orbigny, 1851

Genera
- See text

= Rhizangiidae =

Family of corals

Rhizangiidae is a family of stony corals in the order Scleractinia. This family is closely related to Oculinidae. Members of this family are non-reef building corals and reproduce from stolons. The corallites are small and the septa are simple.

== Genera ==
The World Register of Marine Species includes the following genera in the family:

- †Arctangia Wells, 1937
- Astrangia Milne Edwards & Haime, 1848
- Cladangia Milne Edwards & Haime, 1851
- Culicia Dana, 1846
- Oulangia Milne Edwards & Haime, 1848
- †Platyhelia Tenison-Woods, 1880
- †Rhipidogyra Milne Edwards & Haime, 1848
- †Rhizangia Milne Edwards & Haime, 1848
- †Septastrea d'Orbigny, 1849
