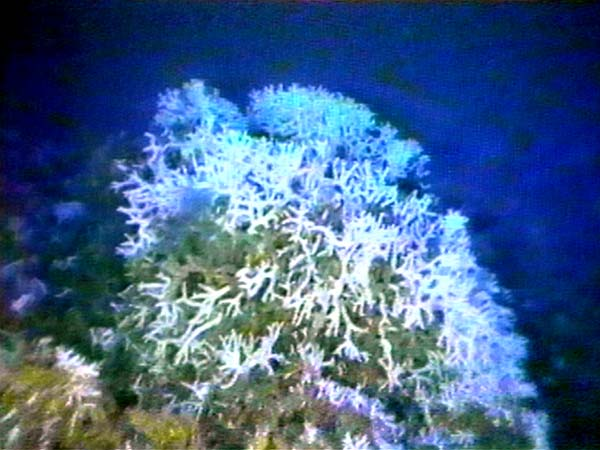
- Oculina varicosa

Scientific classification
- Kingdom: Animalia
- Phylum: Cnidaria
- Subphylum: Anthozoa
- Class: Hexacorallia
- Order: Scleractinia
- Family: Oculinidae; Gray, 1847

Genera
- See text

= Oculinidae =

Family of corals

Oculinidae is a family of colonial corals.

== Characteristics ==
Members of the family Oculinidae are characterised by having the walls of the corallites (the cups which house the polyps) being composed of solid walled though rather fragile tubes connected by a smooth skeletal material called coenosteum. The corallites are widely spaced and robust. The septa (ridges on the corallite walls) curve noticeably outward giving the coral a spiky appearance. Many species in this family form a symbiotic relationship with the flagellate protozoa zooxanthellae which live within the tissues of the polyps. These are photosynthetic algae that provide nutrients for the polyps while themselves benefiting from a safe environment and an elevated, sunny position.

== Genera ==
The World Register of Marine Species lists the following genera:

- Bantamia Yabe & Eguchi, 1943 †
- Bathelia Moseley, 1881
- Cyathelia Milne-Edwards & Haime, 1849
- Madrepora Linnaeus, 1758
- Oculina Lamarck, 1816
- Petrophyllia Conrad, 1855
- Schizoculina Wells, 1937
- Sclerhelia Milne Edwards & Haime, 1850

== Distribution ==
The genera Oculina and Schizoculina are found in the Atlantic Ocean. Most species are uncommon.
