= List of marine aquarium invertebrate species =

This is a list of various species of marine invertebrates, animals without a backbone, that are commonly found in aquariums kept by hobby aquarists. Some species are intentionally collected for their desirable aesthetic characteristics. Others are kept to serve a functional role such as consuming algae in the aquarium. Some species are present only incidentally or are pest species.

== Annelids ==
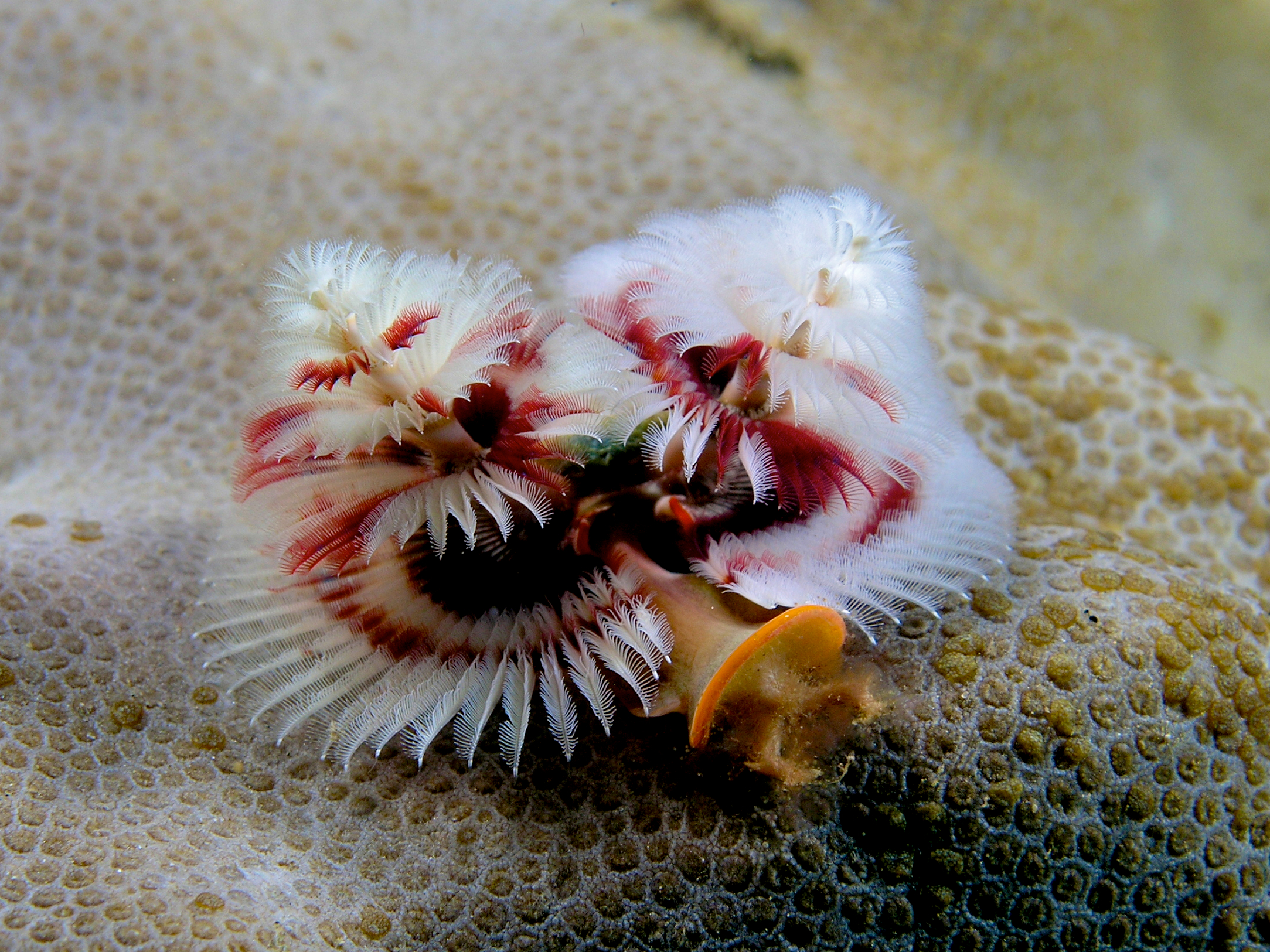
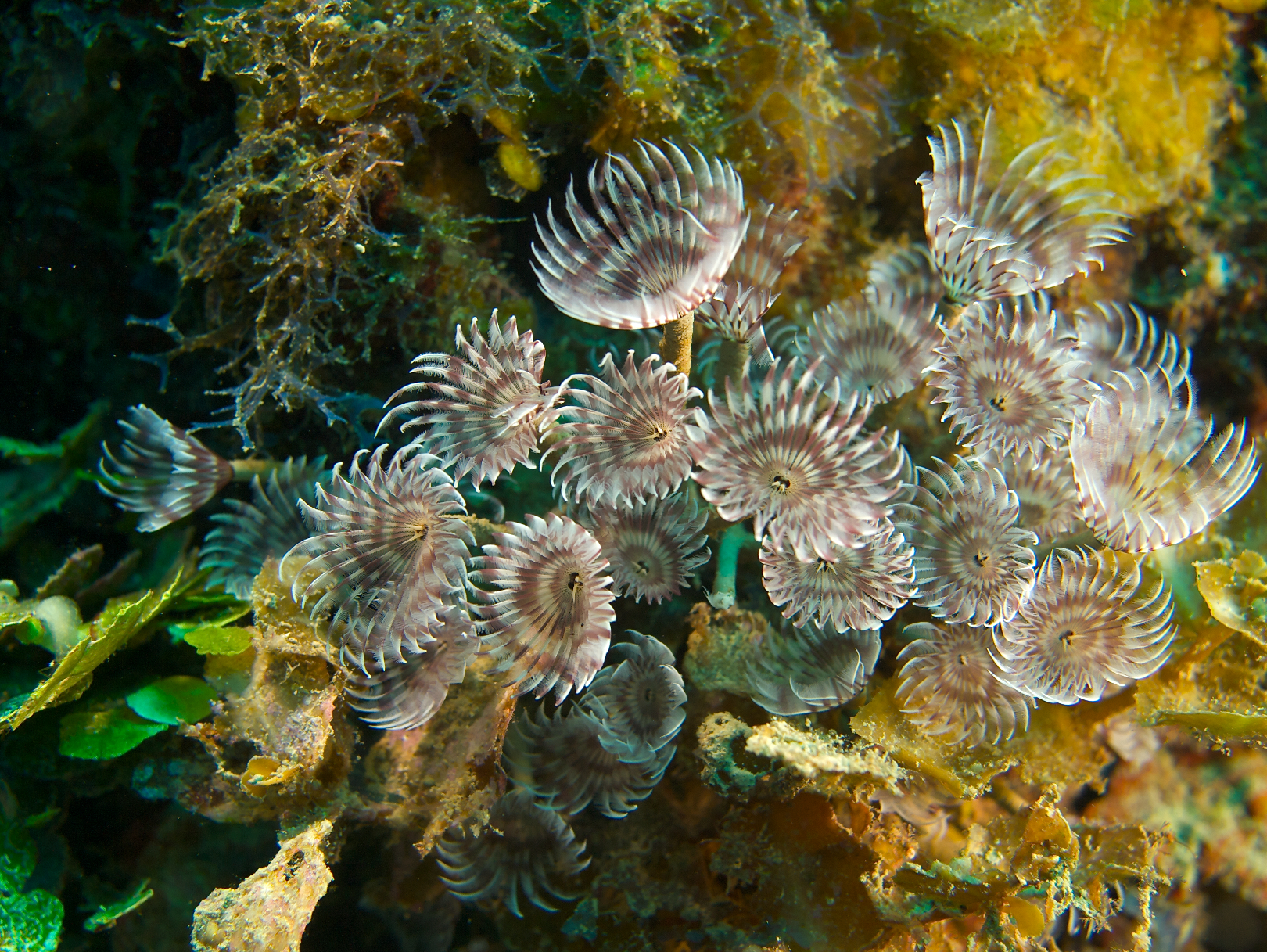
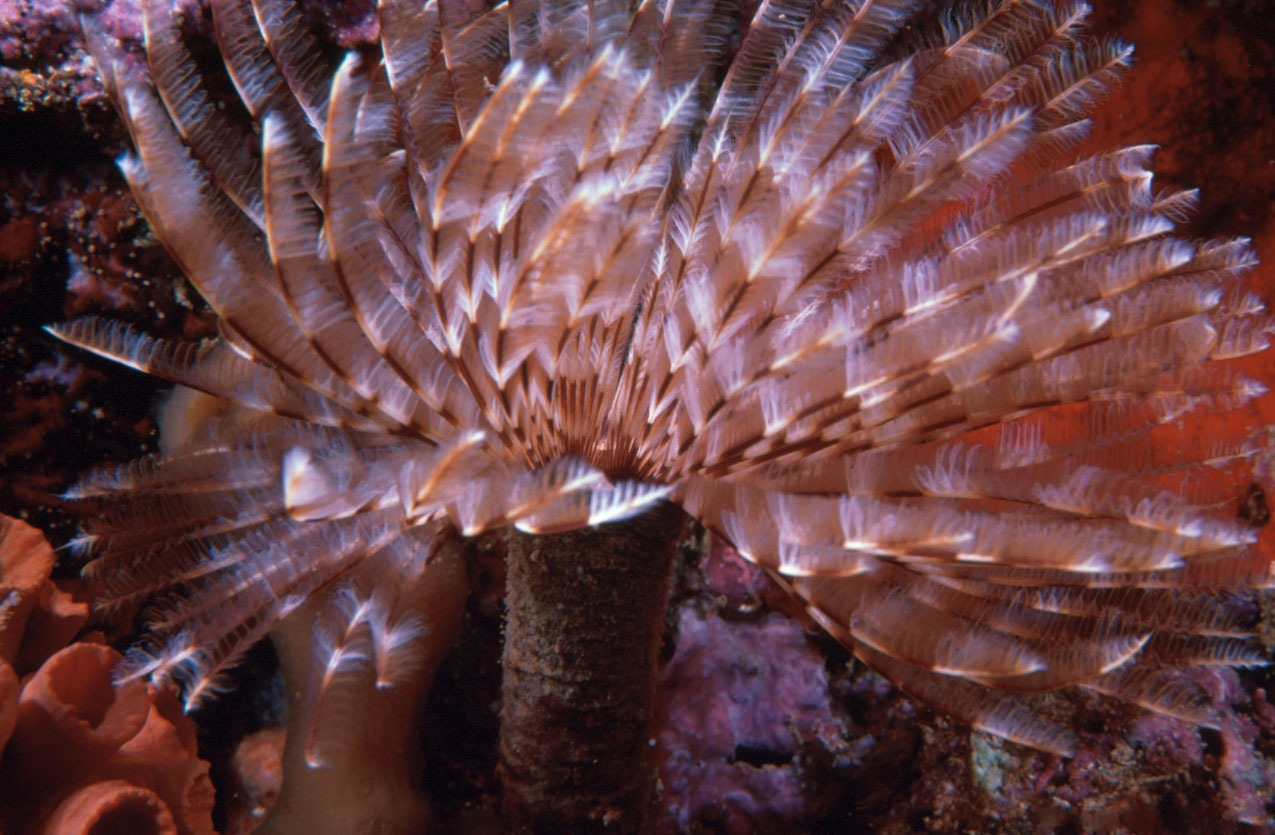
Common name(s)	Image	Taxonomy	Reef safe	Care Level	Description	Max size
Christmas tree worm		Spirobranchus giganteus	Yes	Expert	Found living anchored in live coral colonies in nature. Each worm has two crowns, which come in a variety of different colors, and are spiraled in the shape of a Christmas tree.	5 cm (2.0 in)
Cluster duster		Bispira brunnea	Yes	Moderate	This species grows in groups of up to 100 individual tube worms, living together in a single clump. The clusters of tubes adhere to a rocky substrate at a central point.	2.5 cm (1.0 in)
Feather duster worm, Fan worm		Sabellastarte sp.	Yes	Easy to Moderate	A sedentary (but it can scoot around), tube dwelling worm with a fan-shaped crown (radiole) that projects from the end of the tube. This can be white, tan, orange, sometimes with striping. They build their tubes out of sand, mud, and bits of shell.	20 cm (7.9 in)

== Arthropods ==
=== Chelicerates ===
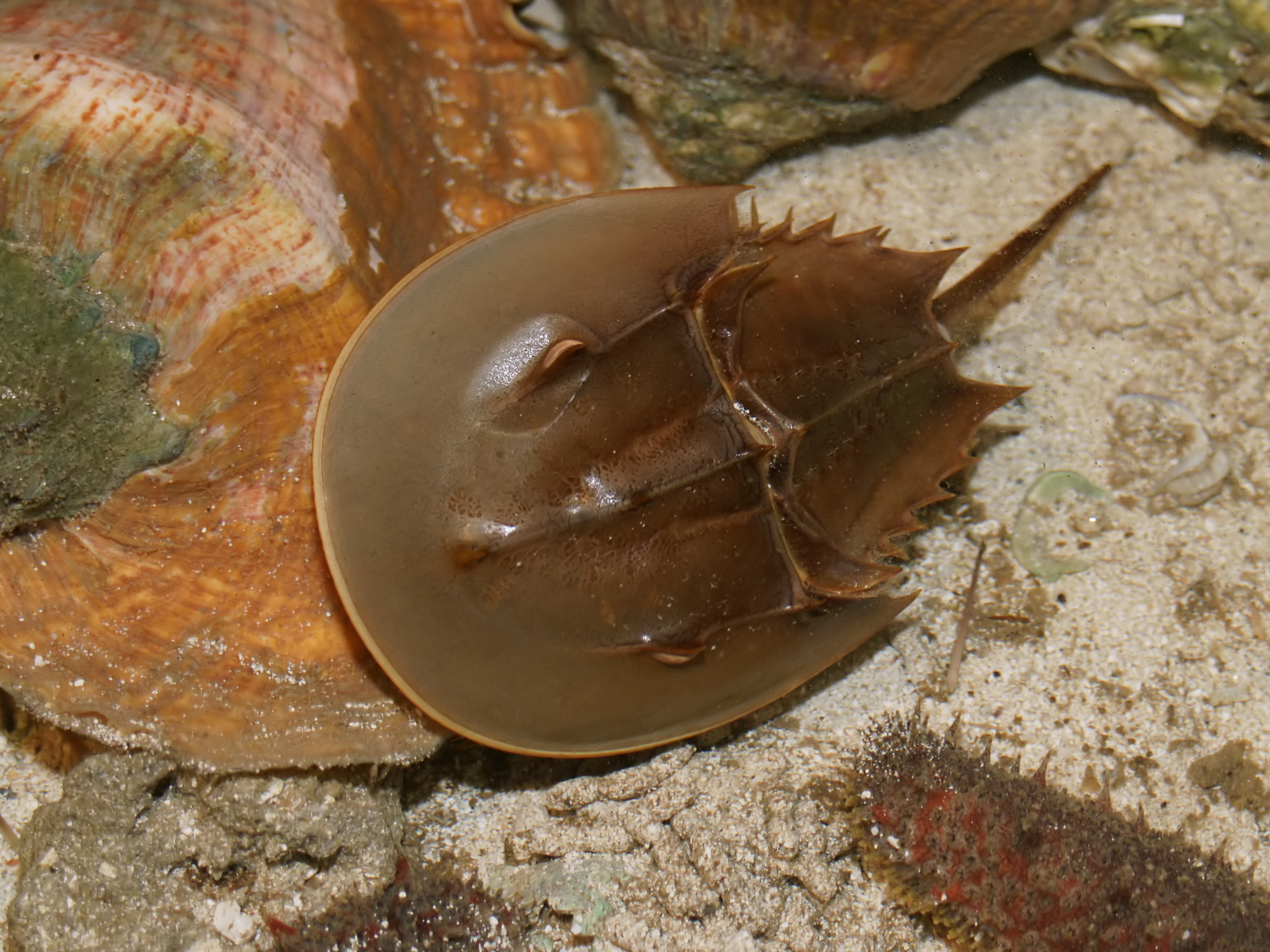
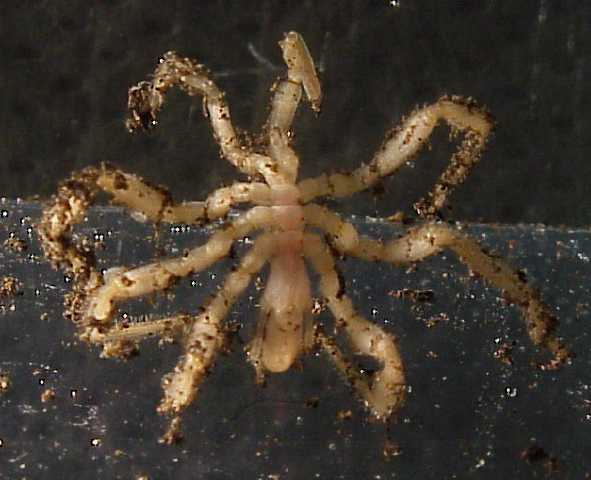
Common name	Image	Taxonomy	Reef safe	Care Level	Description	Max size
Atlantic horseshoe crab		Limulus polyphemus	Yes, with caution	Easy	A bottom dwelling animal that is actually not a true crab. Found burrowing in mud or sand flats in the wild, they need a deep sand bed in their aquarium.	60 cm (23.6 in)
Sea spider		Pycnogonids	No	Moderate	Not collected for the aquarium trade, but occasionally seen on live rock and corals as a hitchhiker. They can be pests in a reef tank, preying on soft coral, sponges and anemones.	0.2–50 cm (0.1–19.7 in)

=== Crustaceans ===
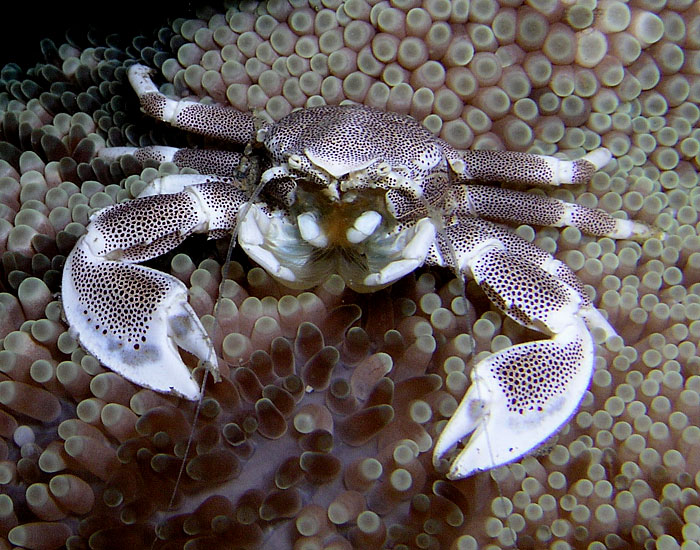
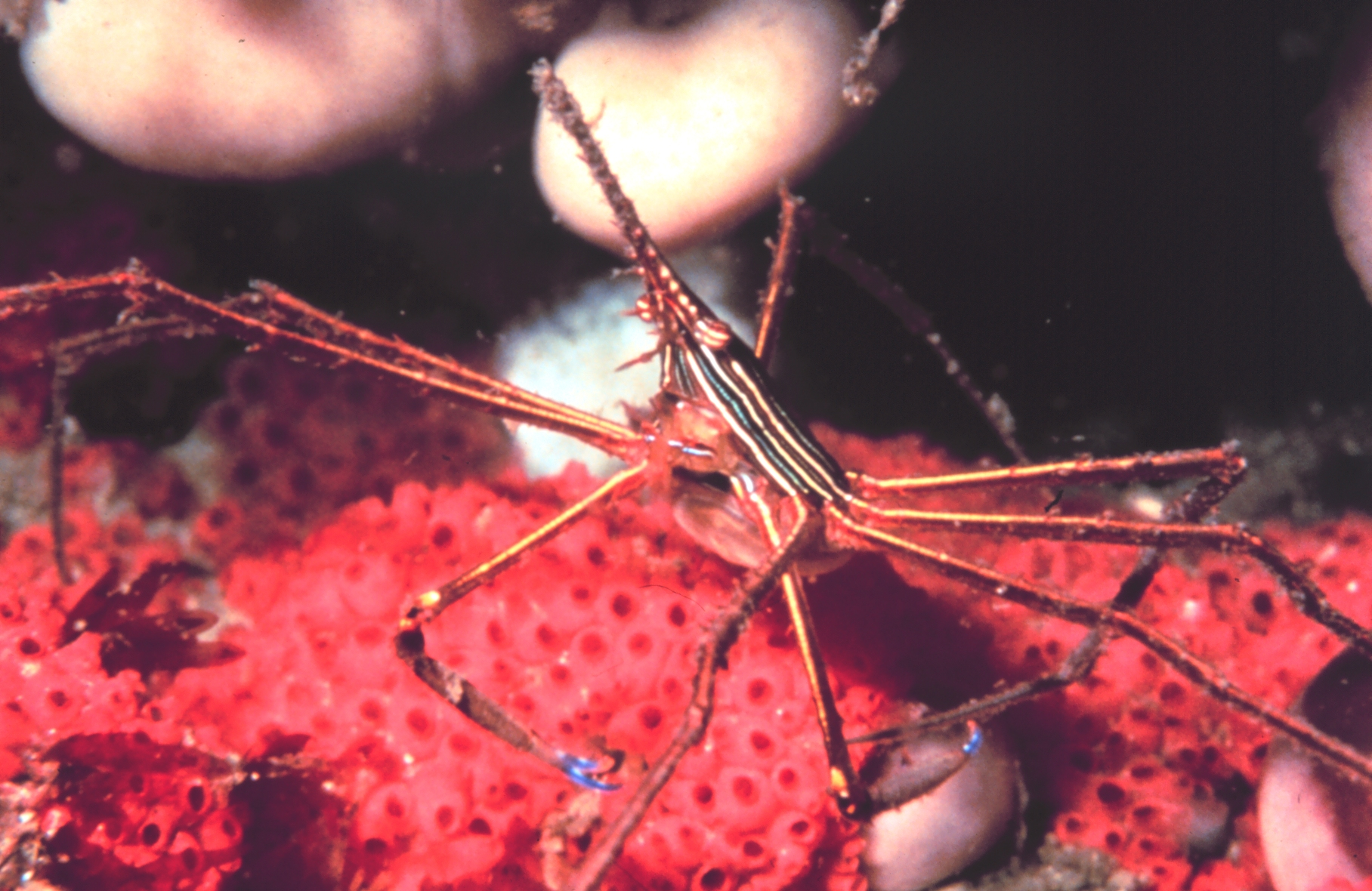
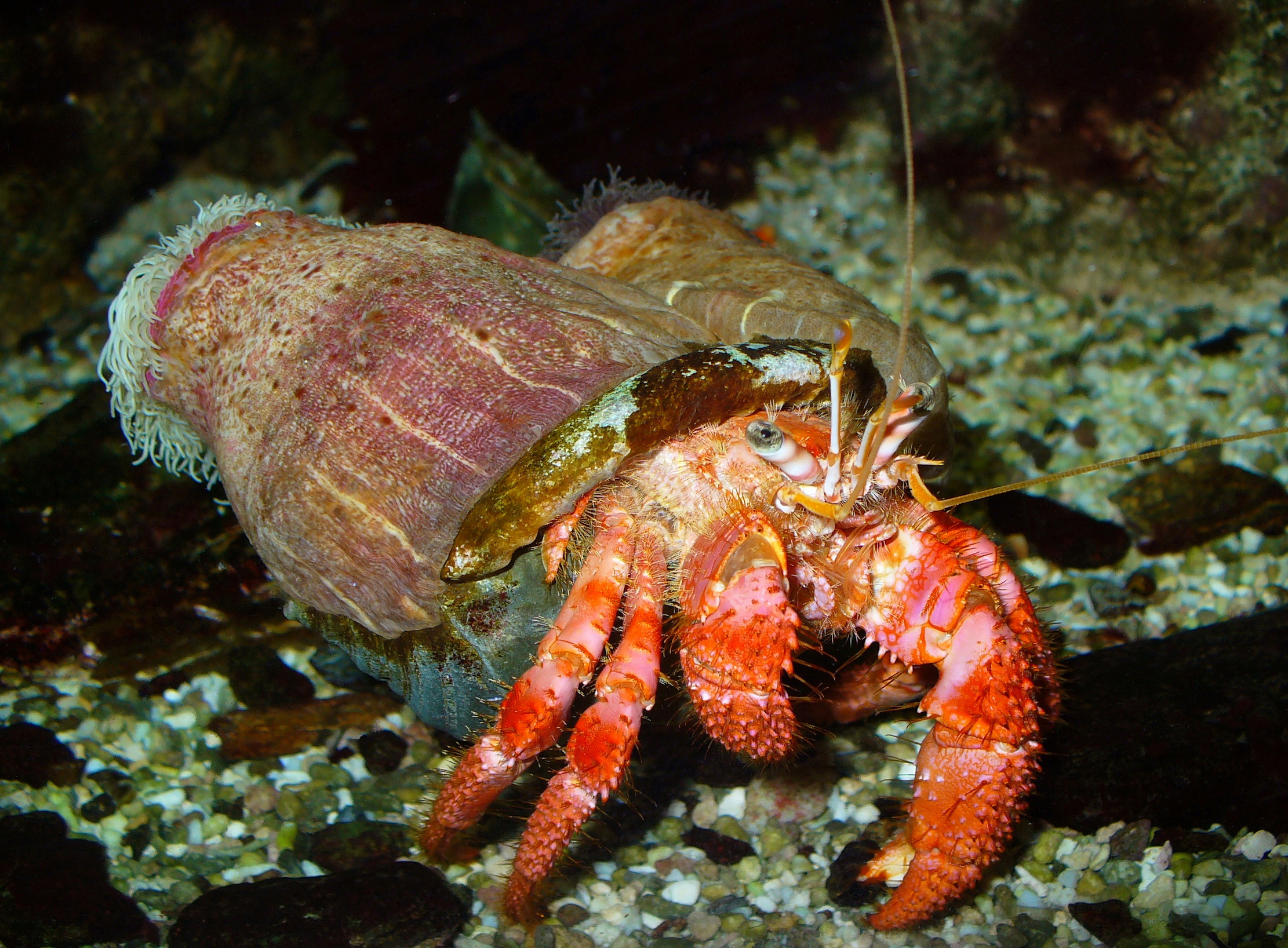
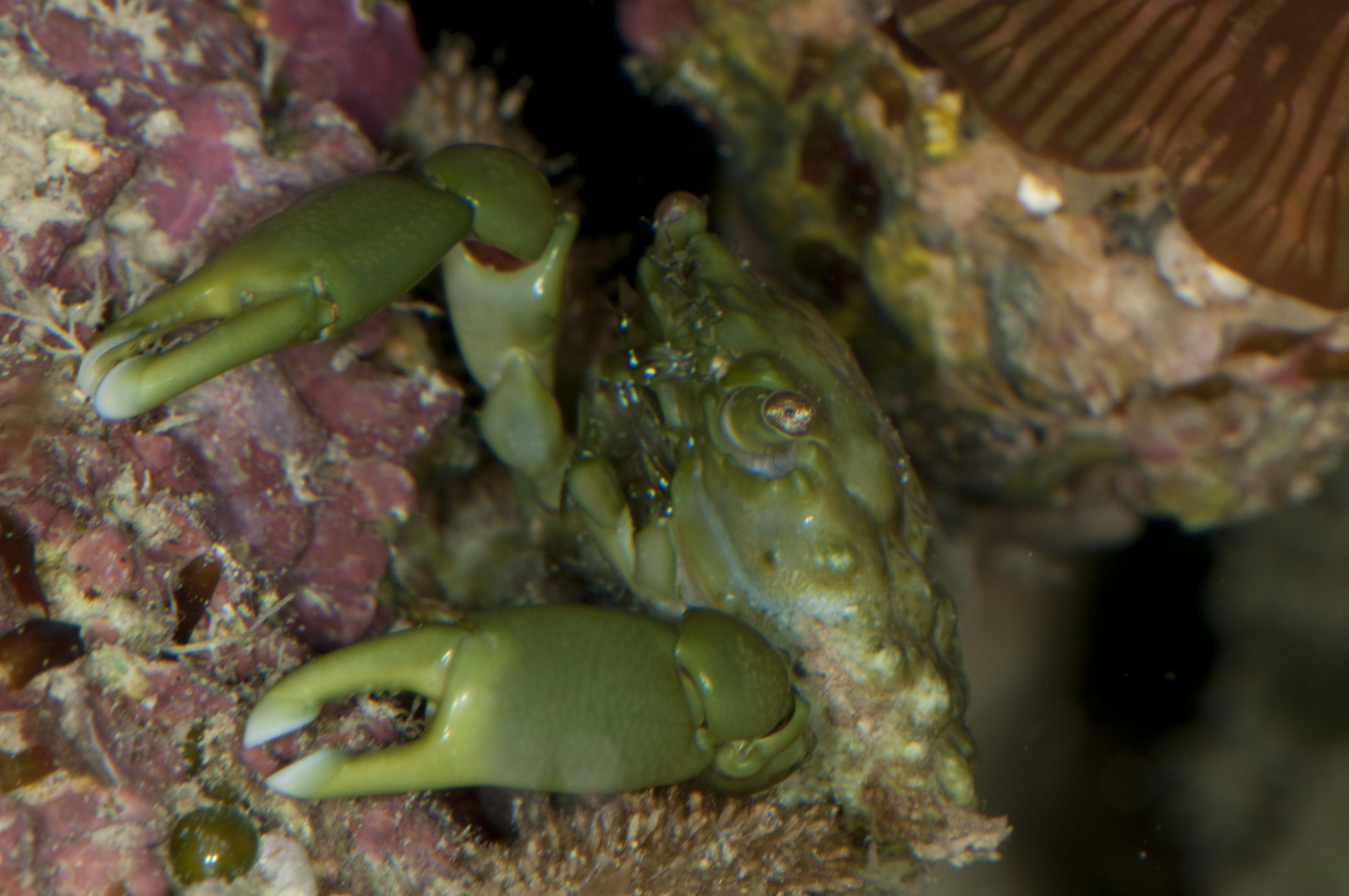
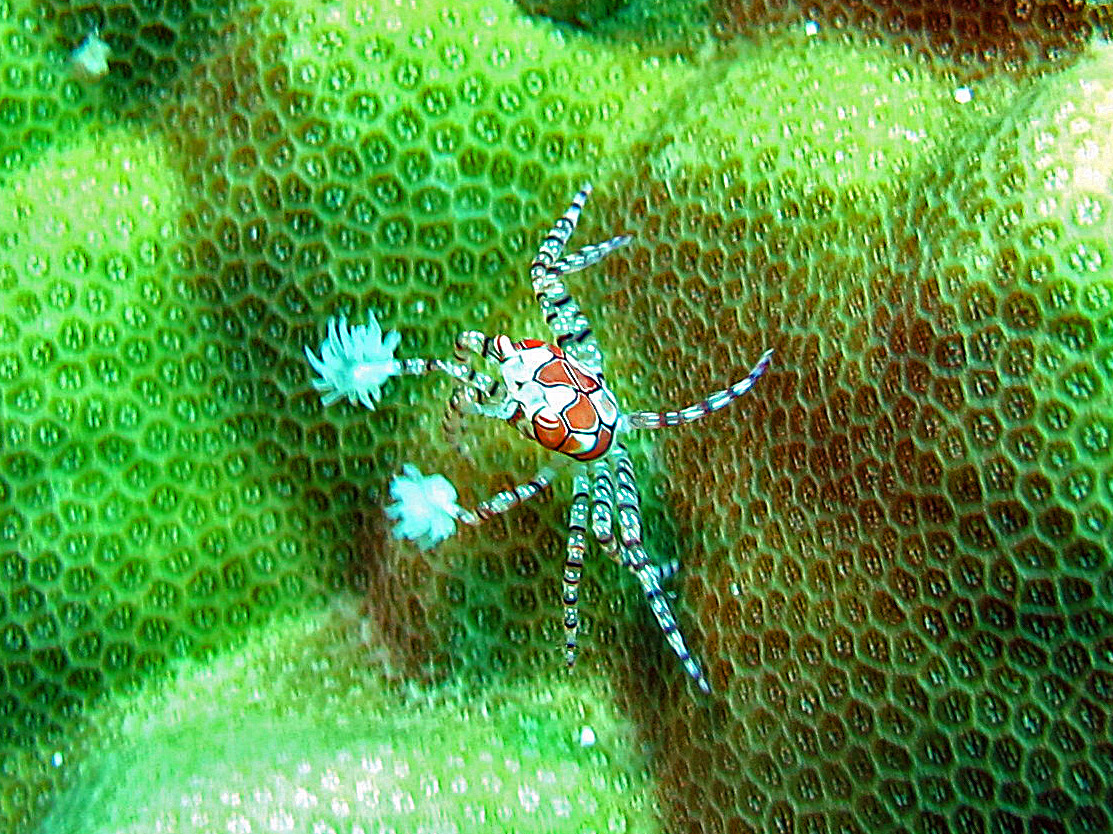
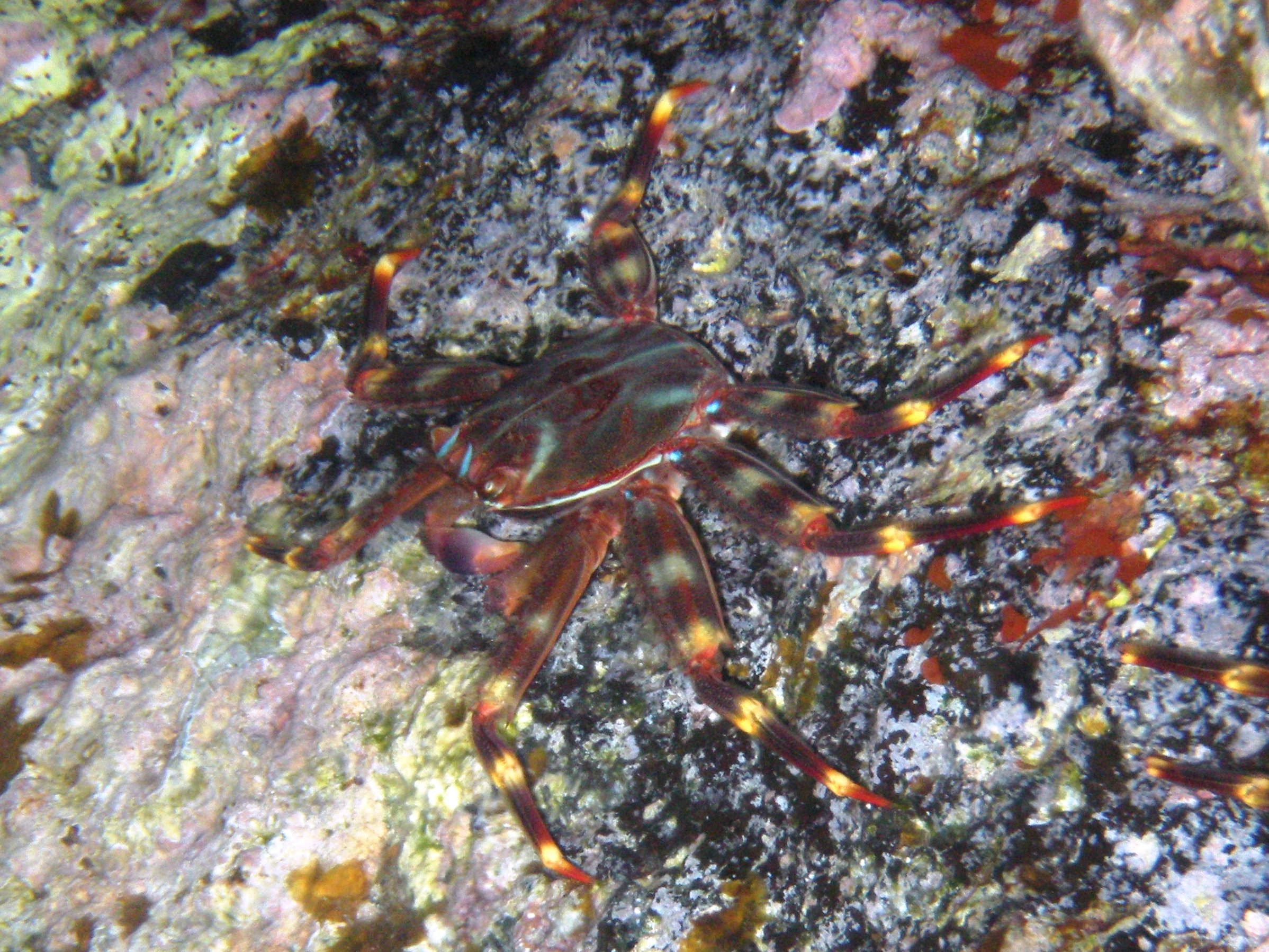
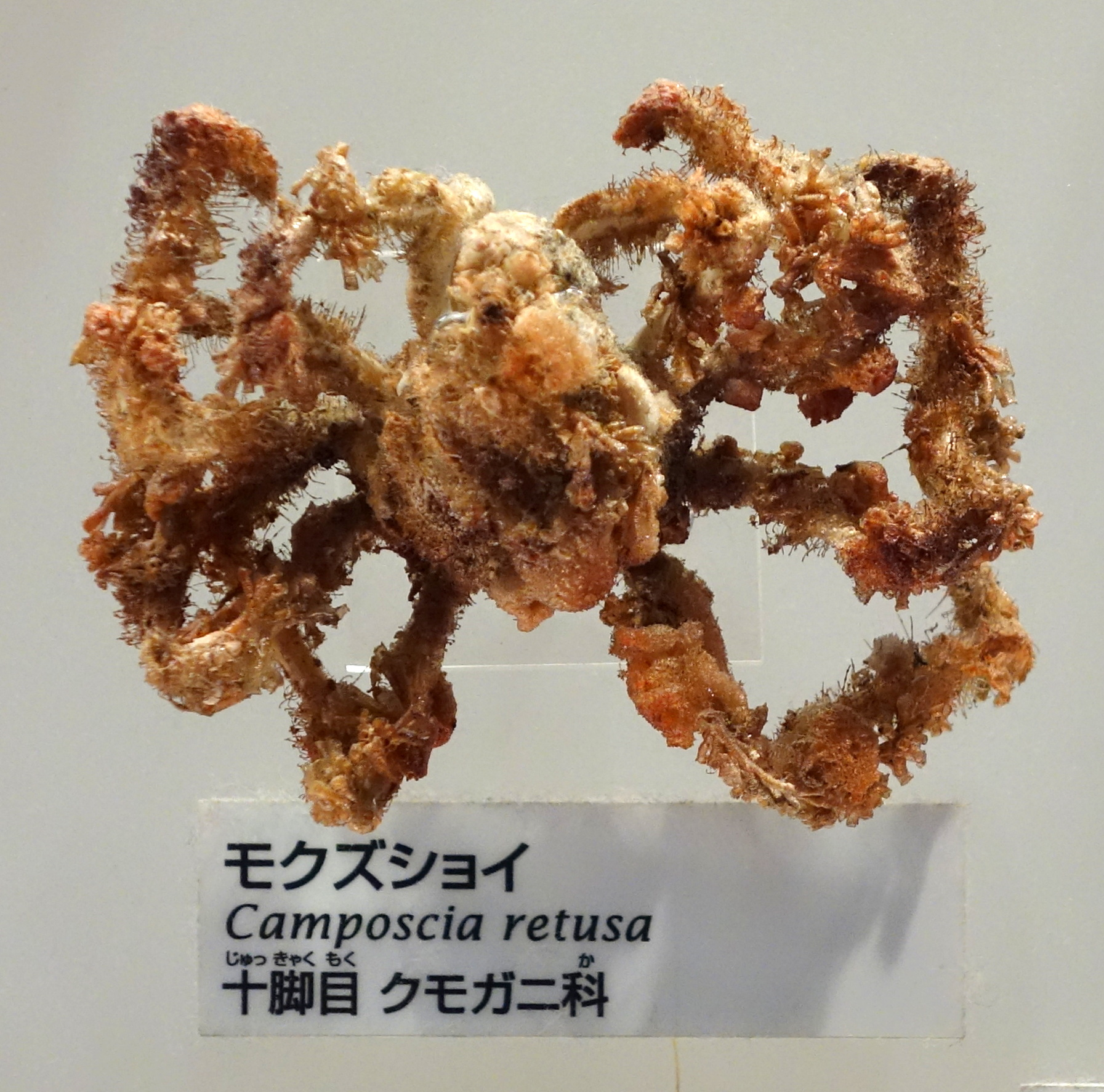
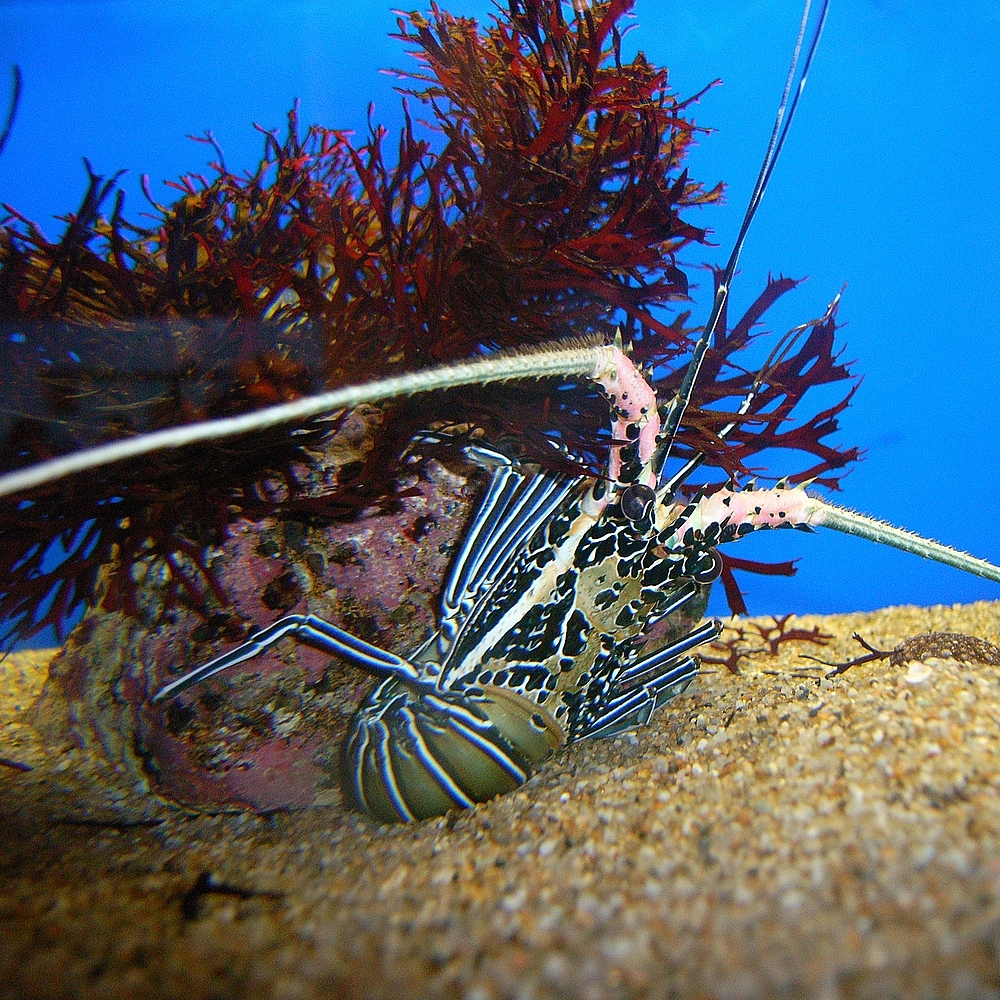
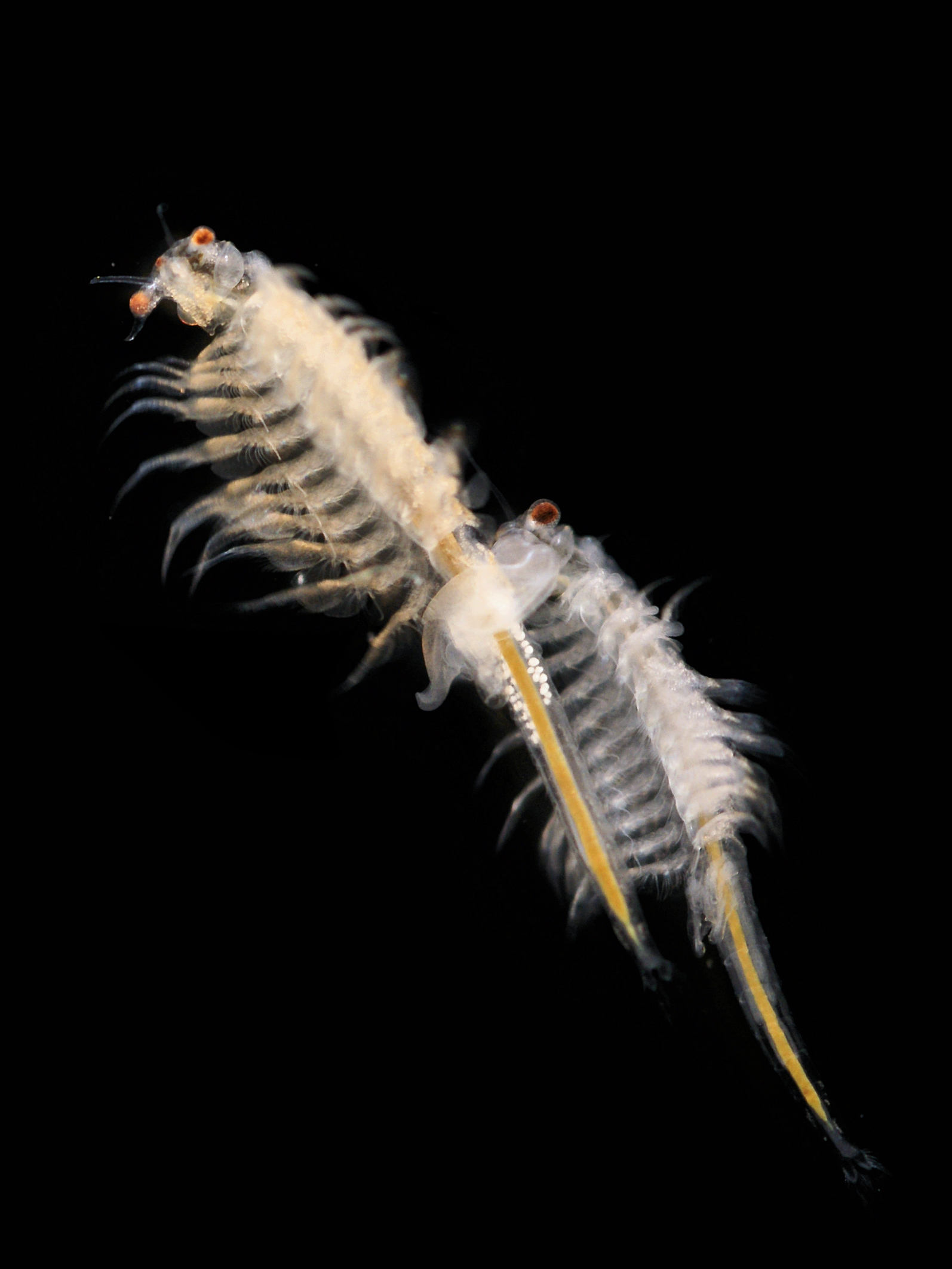
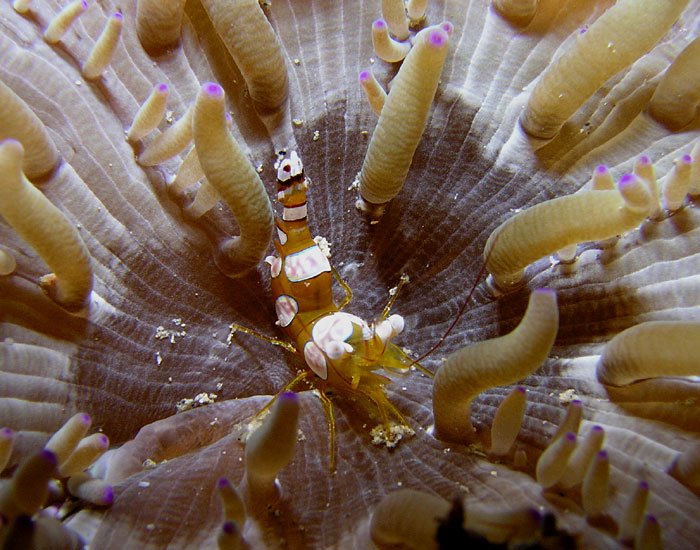
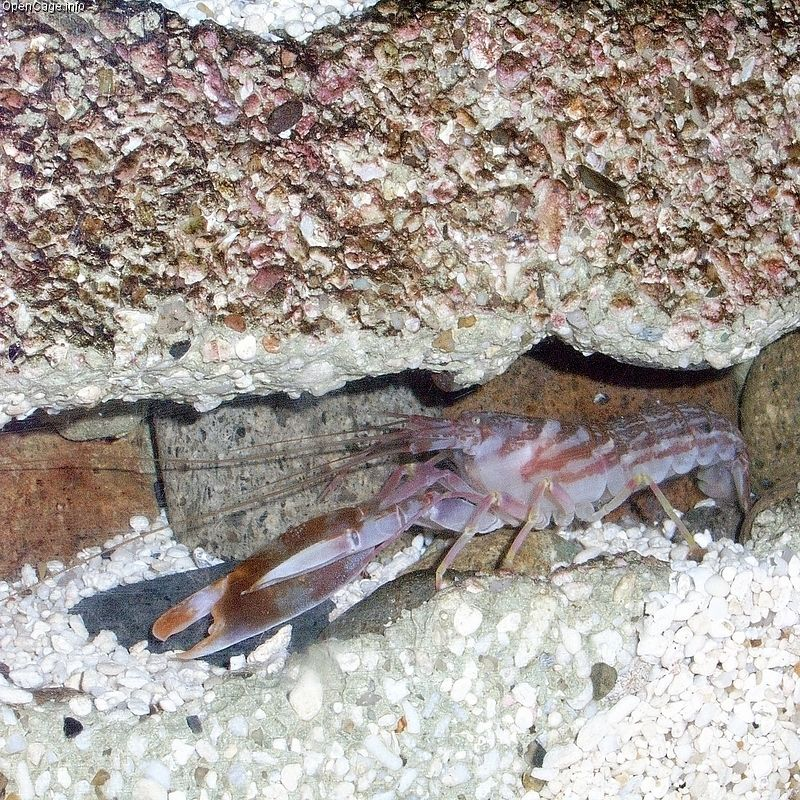
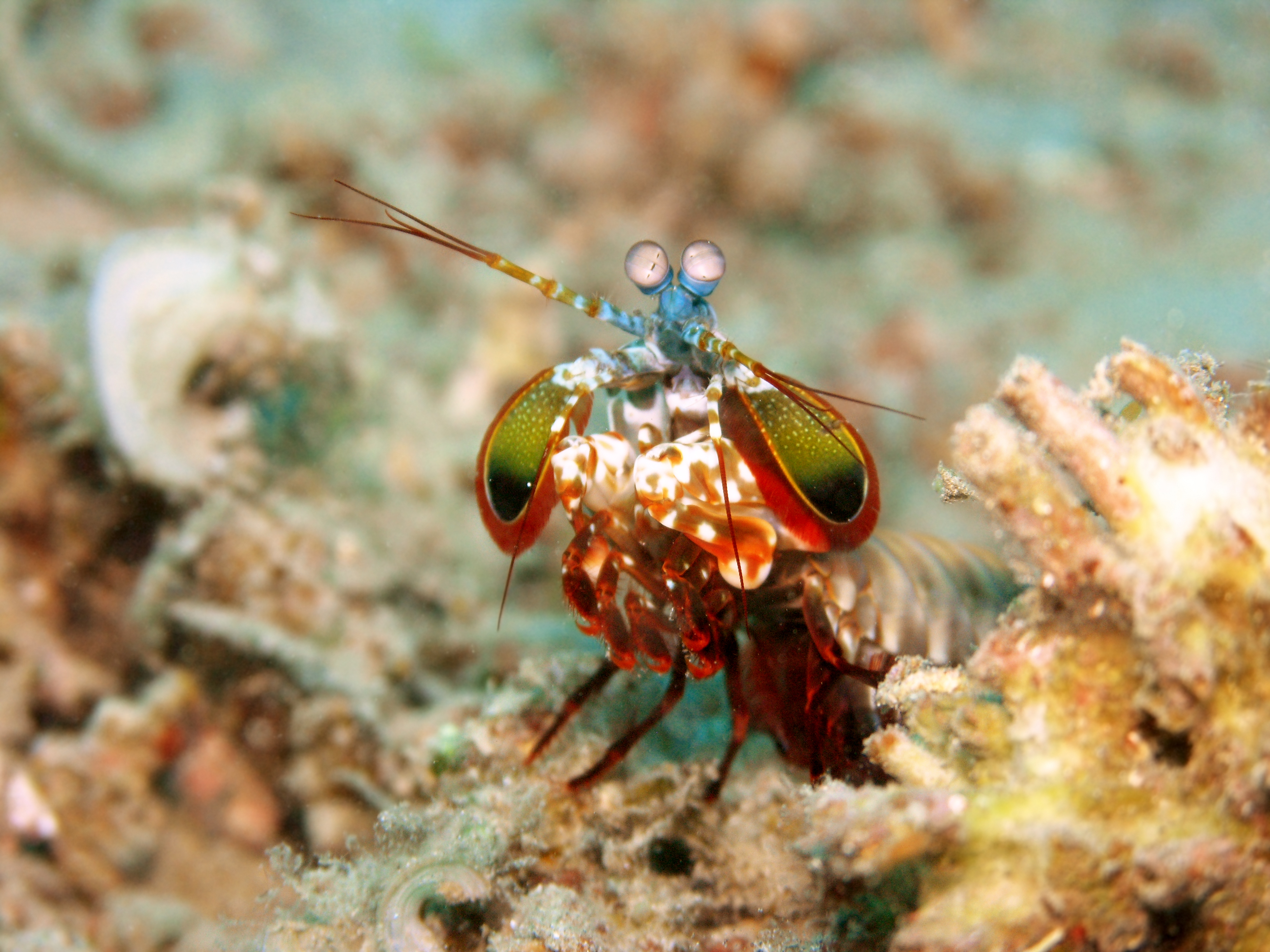
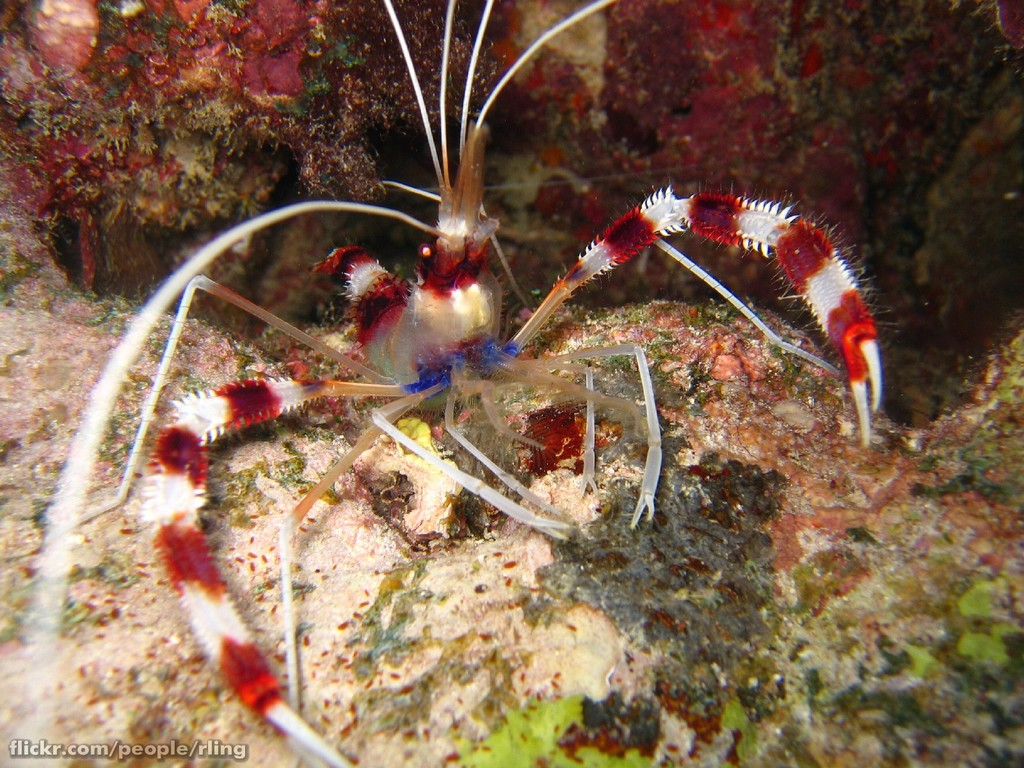
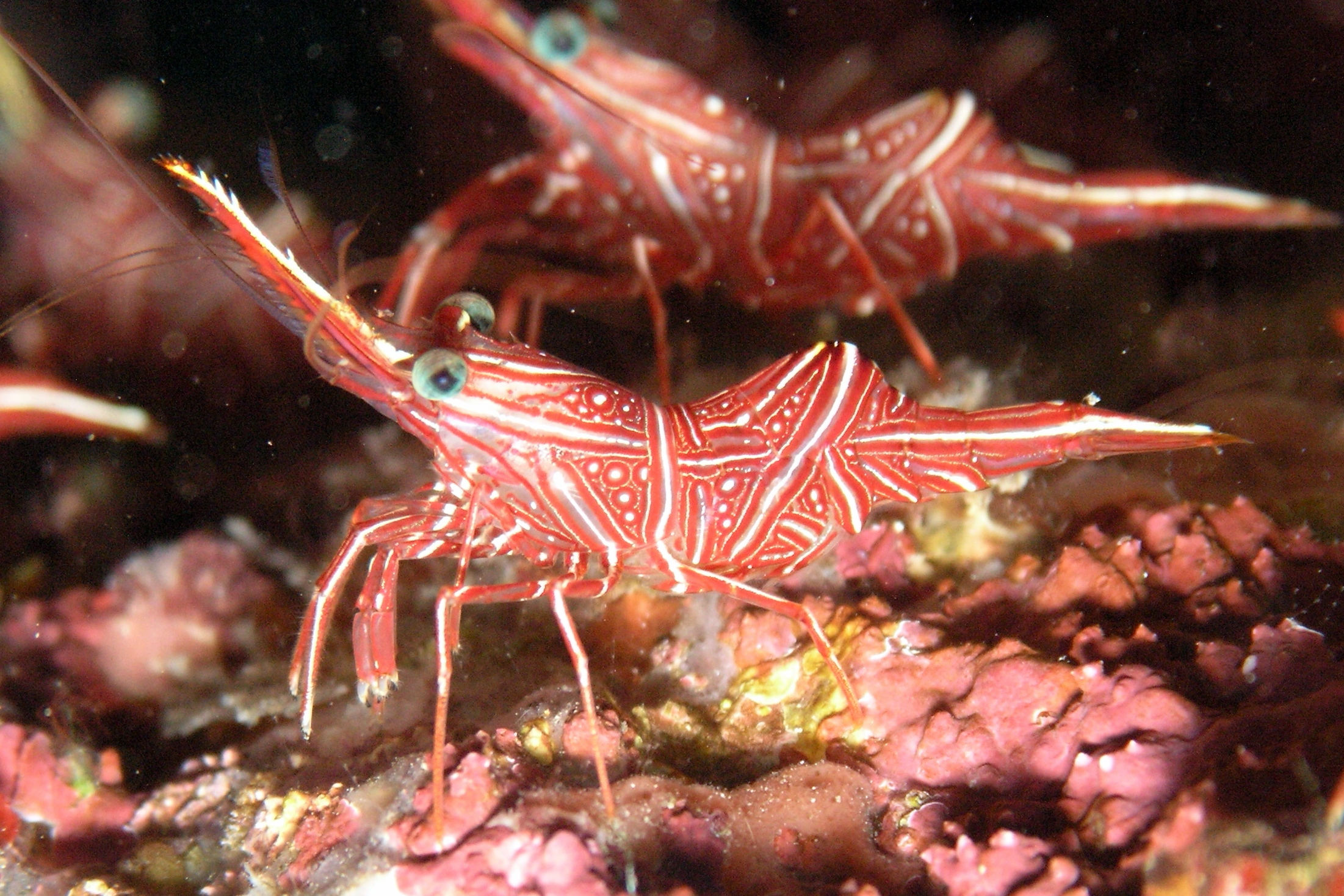
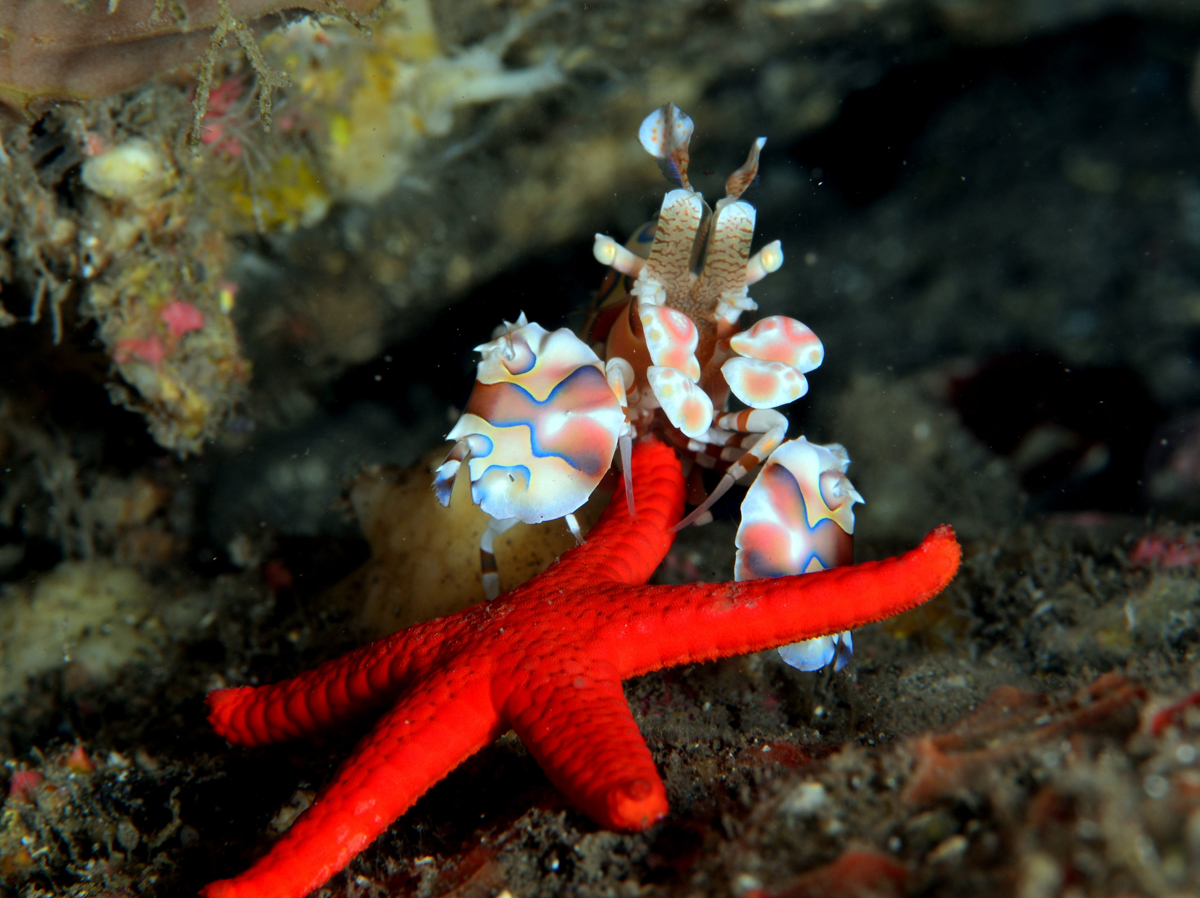
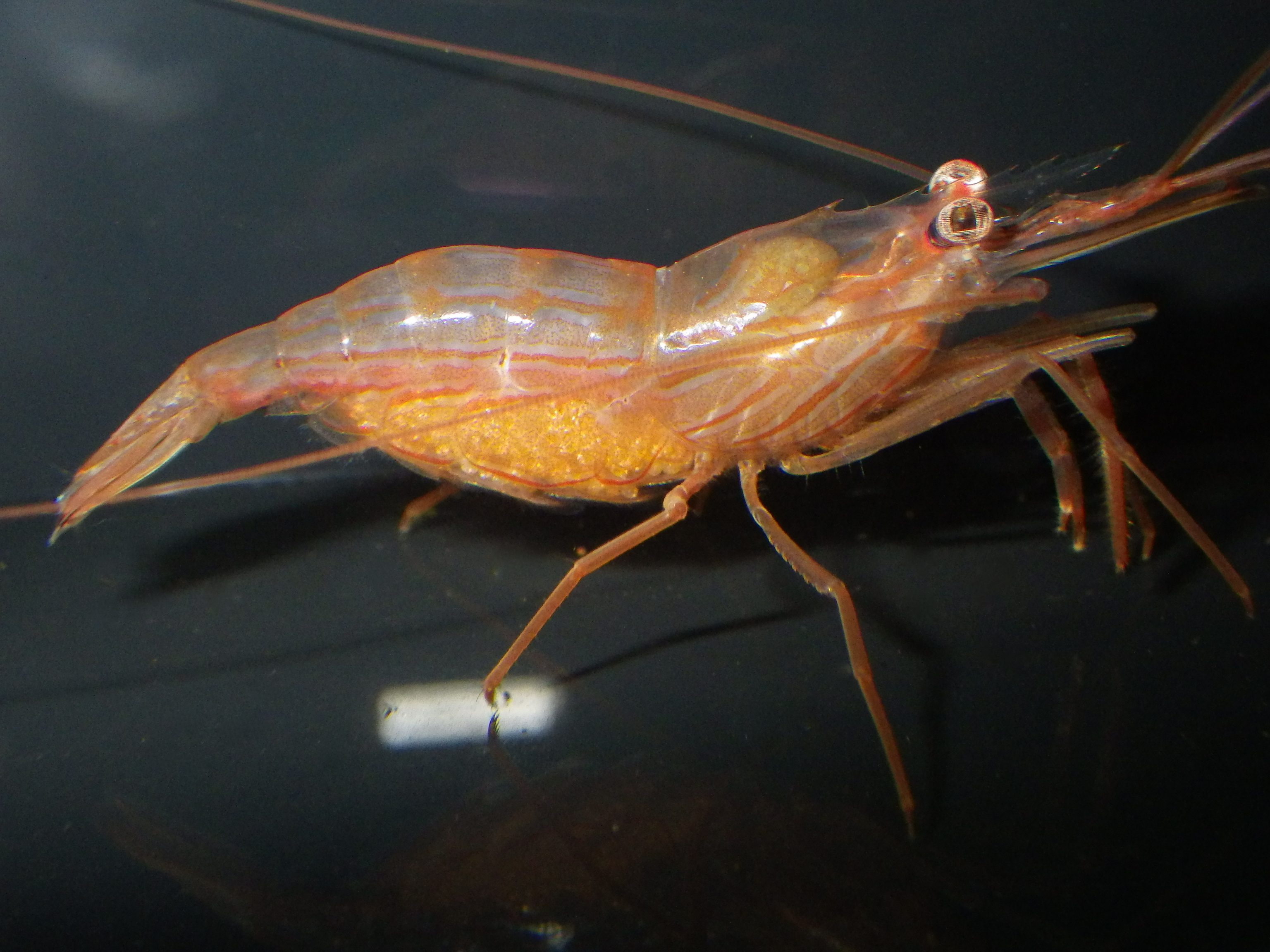
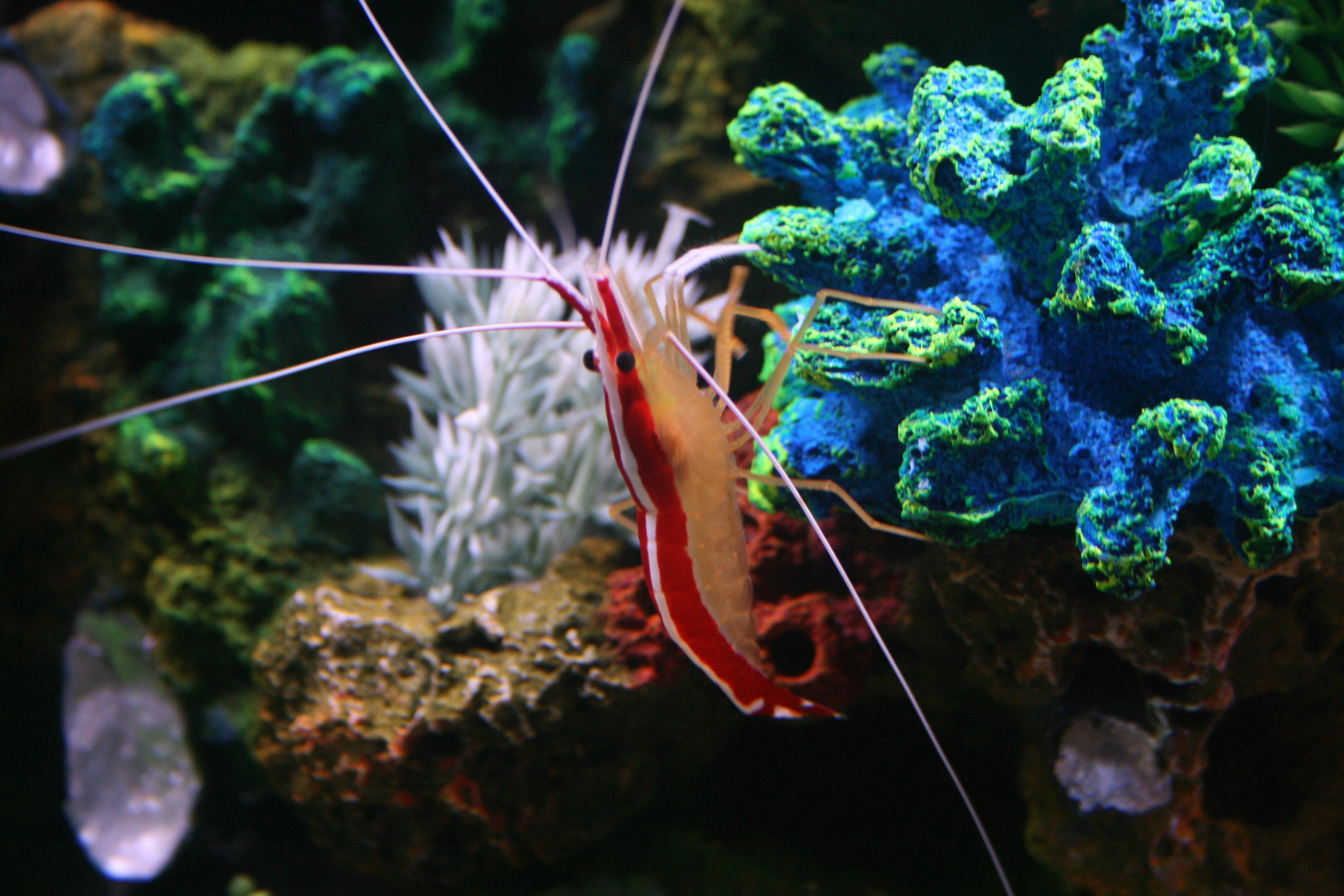
Common name	Image	Taxonomy	Reef safe	Care Level	Notes	Max size
Anemone crab		Neopetrolisthes maculatus	Yes	Easy	It lives in anemones. Also a filter feeder
Arrow crab		Stenorhynchus seticornis	with caution
Hermit crabs		Paguroidea sp.	Will eat snails	Easy
Emerald crab		Mithraculus sculptus	With caution?	Easy	May eat fish
Pom-pom crab		Lybia tessellata	With caution?	Easy?
Sally lightfoot crab		Percnon gibbesi	With caution?	Easy?
Spider decorator crab		Camposcia retusa	With caution?	Easy?	Will get some polyps to use for cover.
Spiny lobster		Panulirus versicolor
Brine shrimp		Artemia salina	Yes	Easy	Kept not as livestock, but rather to feed inverts and fish.
Sexy shrimp		Thor amboinensis	Yes	Easy
Snapping shrimp		Alpheidae sp.	With caution?		Will make loud snapping sounds.
Peacock mantis shrimp		Odontodactylus scyllarus	with caution	Easy	Will eat shelled things and possibly fish. Some people say they will redecorate their tank including moving corals but people have successfully kept them in reef tanks. Not a true shrimp but a stomatapod with the smashing raptorial appendage
Coral banded shrimp		Stenopus hispidus	Yes	Easy	Will eat small fish, in the wild they set up cleaning stations
Camel shrimp		Rhynchocinetes durbanensis	Yes	Easy?	Will nip on soft corals.
Harlequin shrimp		Hymenocera sp.	Will eat starfish	Moderate?	Will only eat starfish.
Peppermint shrimp		Lysmata wurdemanni complex	Yes	Easy	Some people think they eat corals, but they only eat dying coral (although this gives the appearance of eating healthy corals)
Skunk cleaner shrimp		Lysmata amboinensis	Yes	Easy	Will clean dead tissue and remove parasites from fish.

== Corals ==
=== Corallimorphs ===
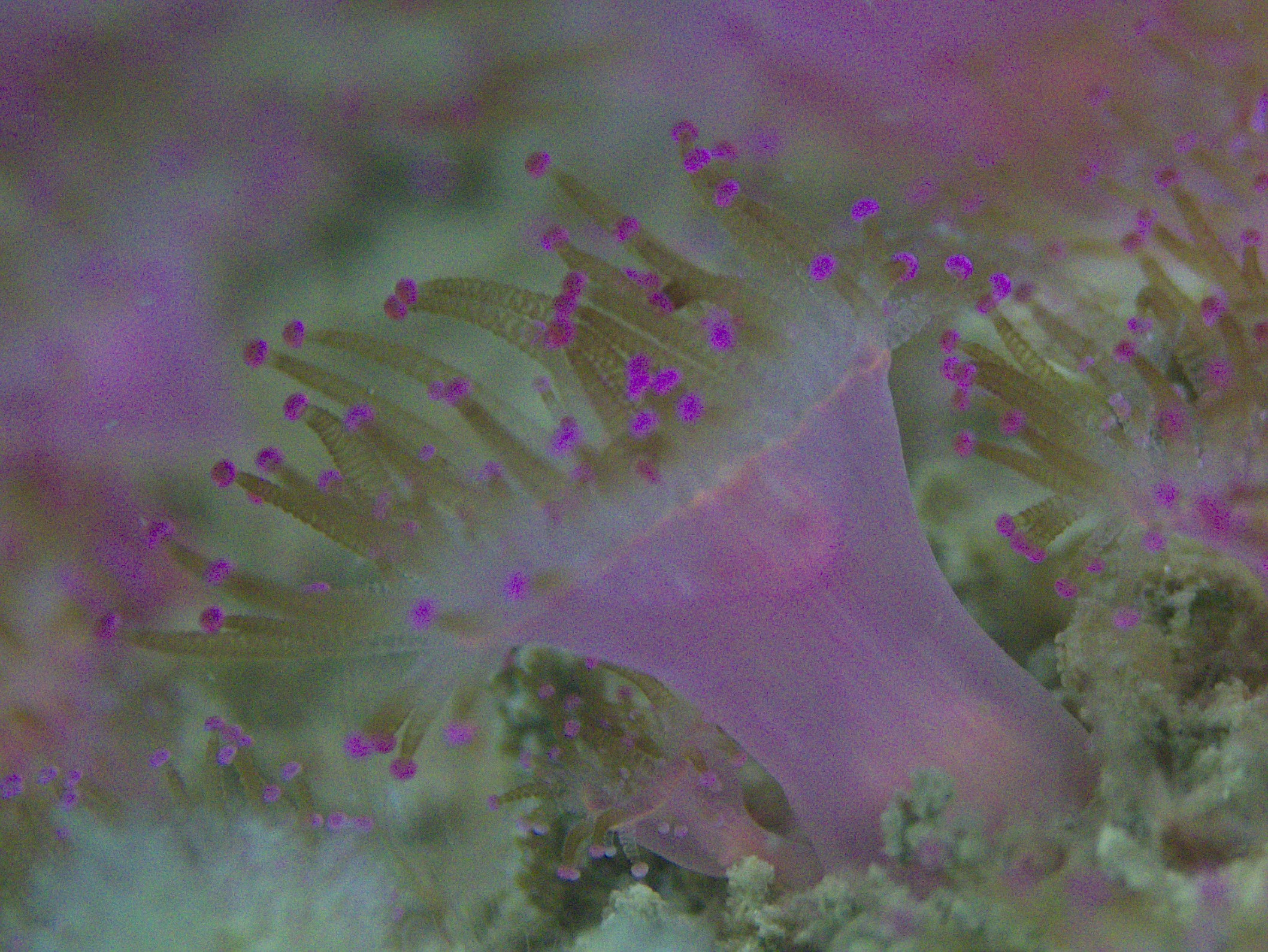
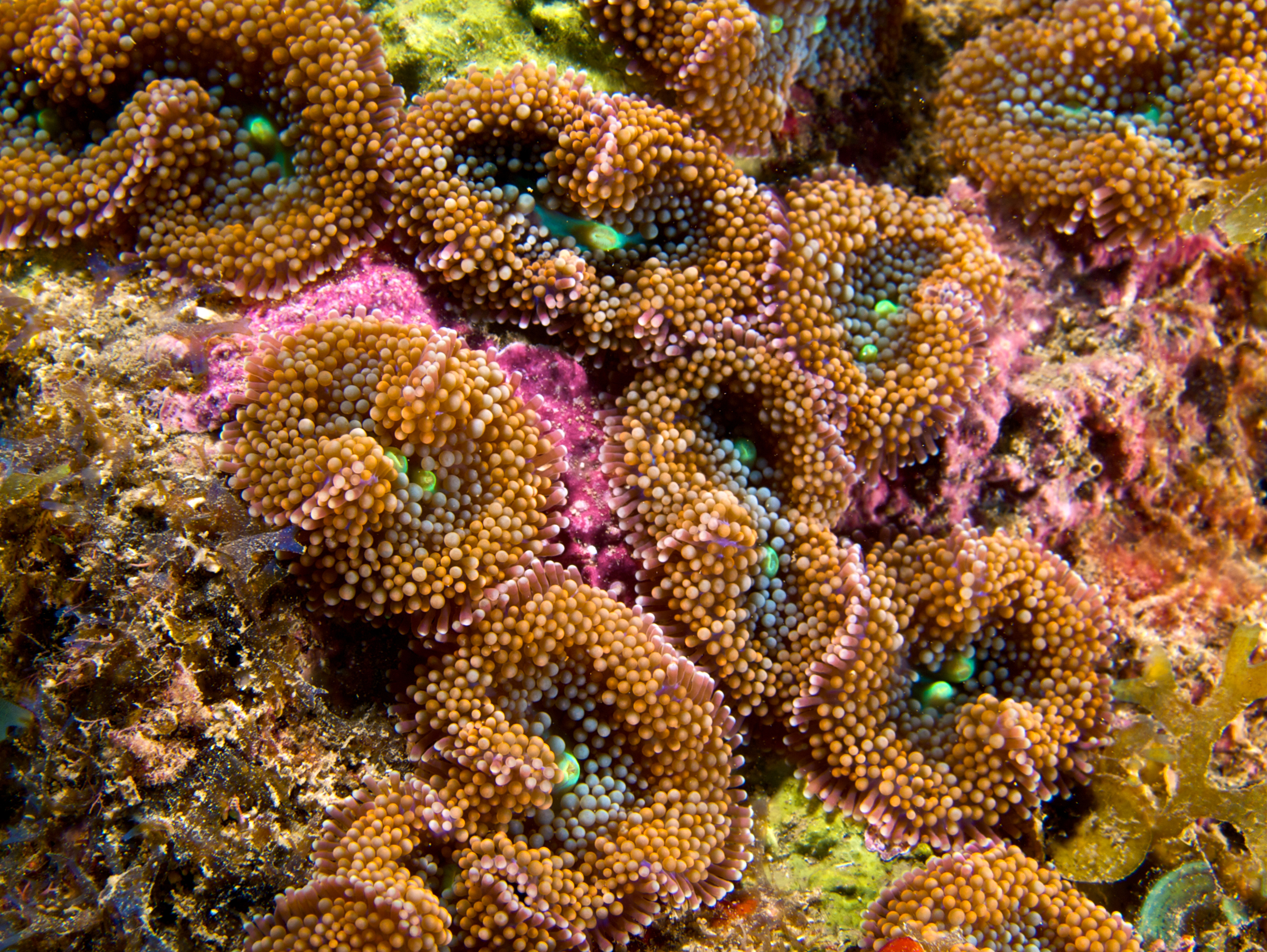
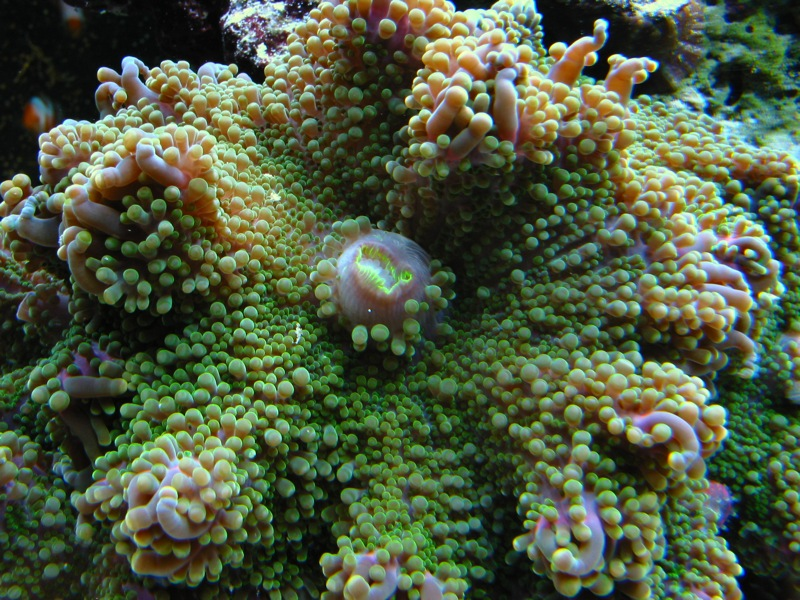
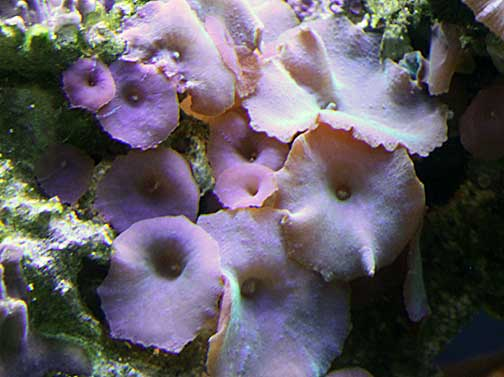
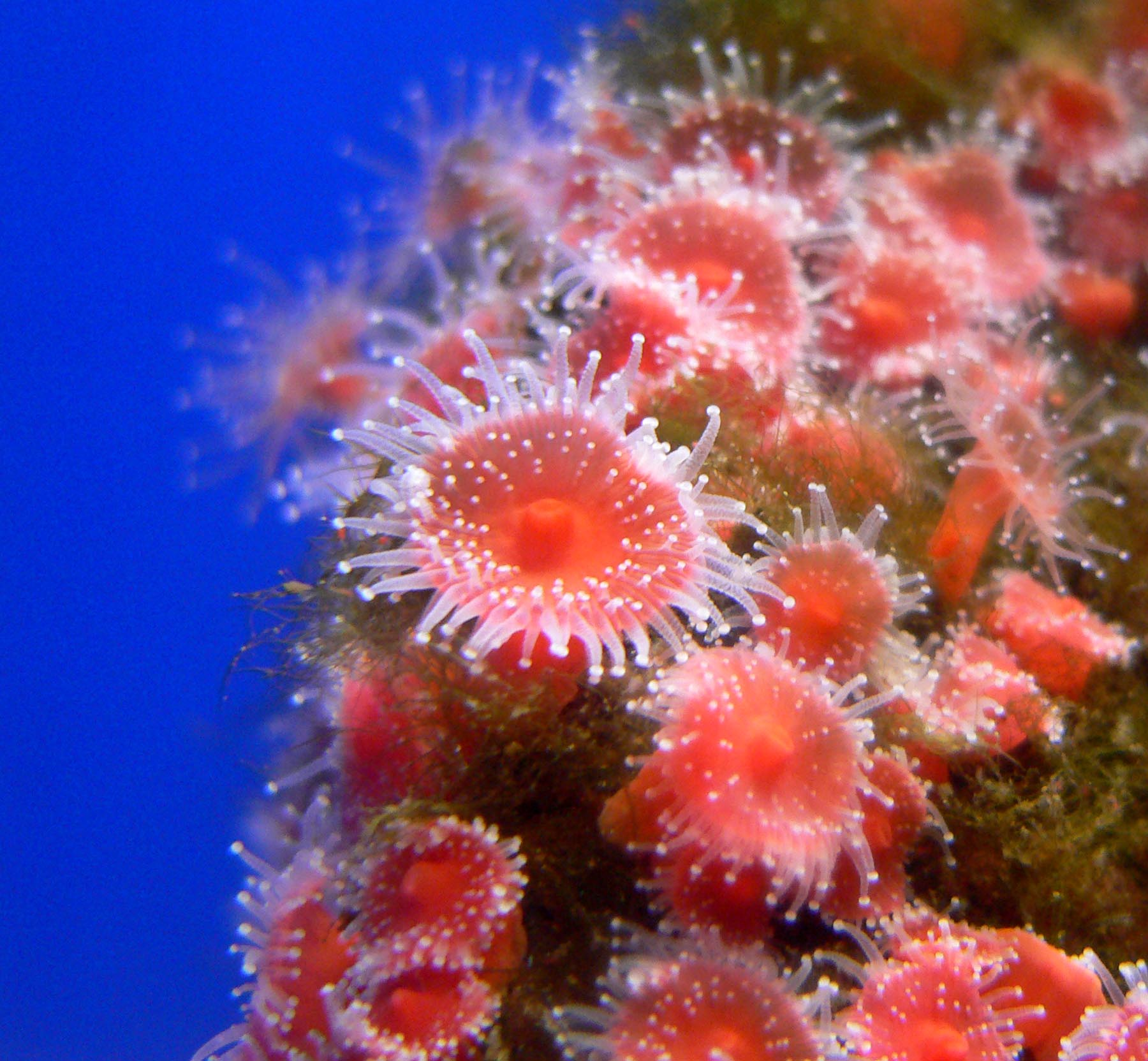
Common name(s)	Image	Taxonomy	Temperament	Care Level	Description	Max size
Jewel anemone		Corynactis viridis			small polyps with all colours	1 cm
Knobbly mushroom coral, Florida false coral		Ricordea florida			a knobbly coral with vibrant colours	7 cm
Knobbly mushroom coral, Yuma mushroom coral		Ricordea yuma	Semi-aggressive	Moderate		1 meter
Mushroom coral, Mushroom anemone, Disk anemone		Discosoma sp.	Semi-aggressive	Easy		50 cm
Strawberry anemone		Corynactis californica			small red polyps with pink tentacles	2.5 cm

=== Hydrocorals ===
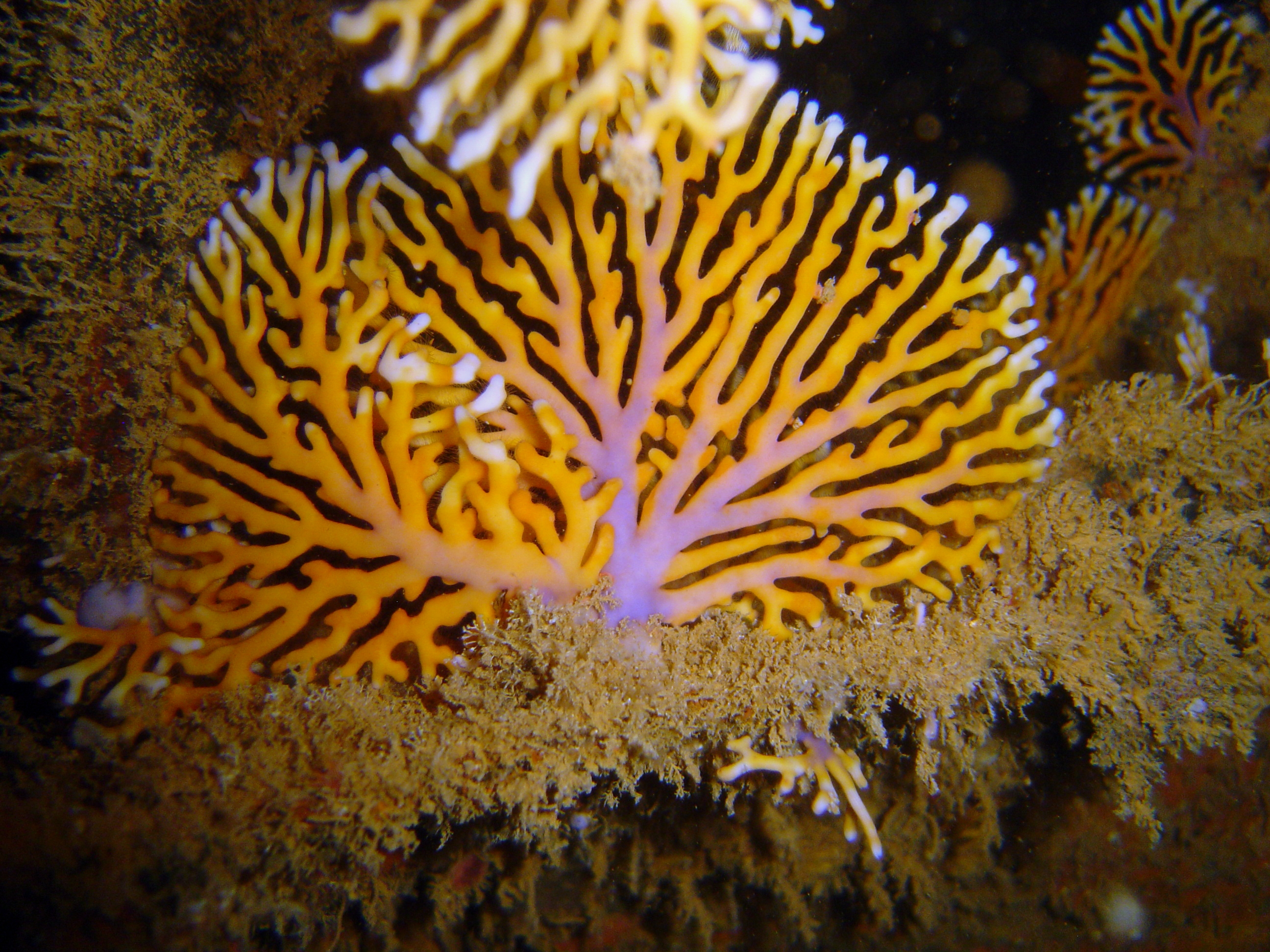
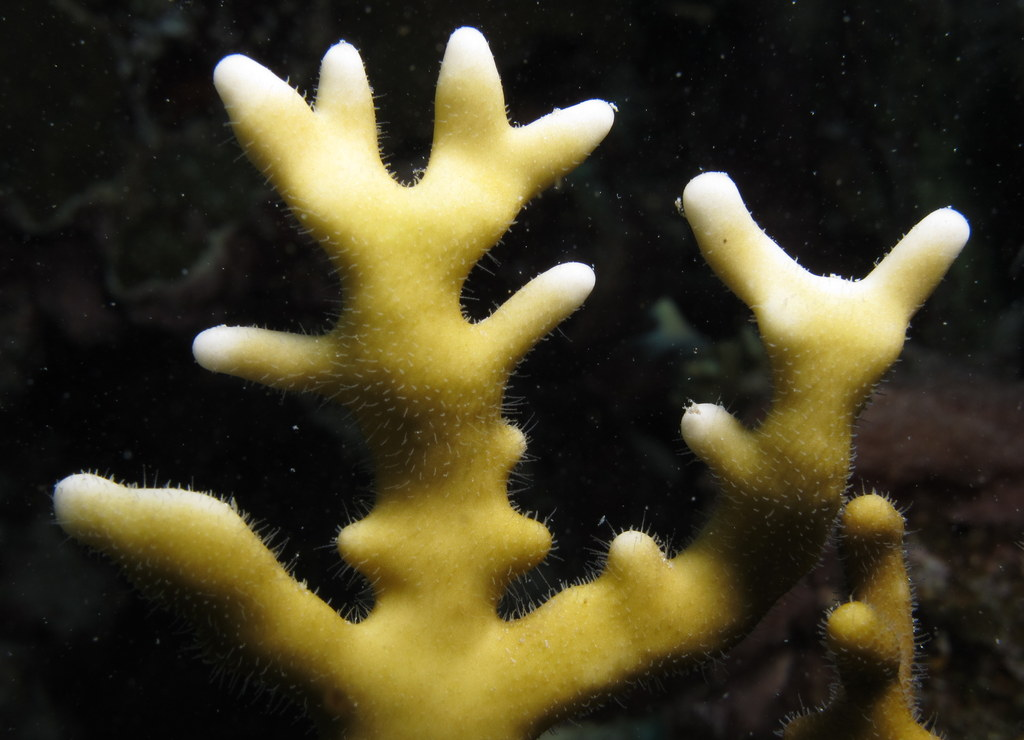
Common name	Image	Taxonomy	Temperament	Care Level	Description	Max size
Lace coral		Distichopora sp.
Fire coral		Millepora sp.

=== Large-polyp stony ===
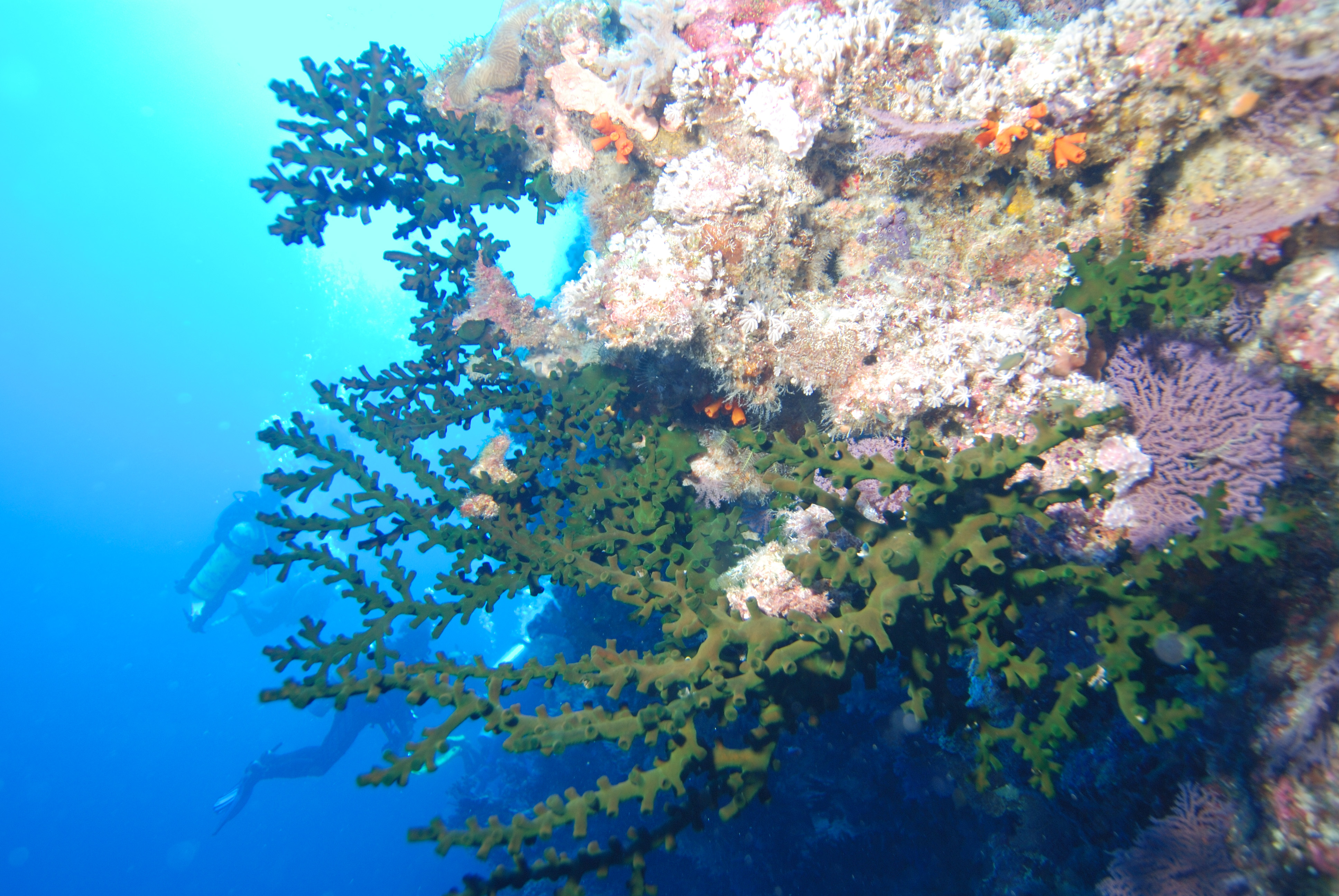
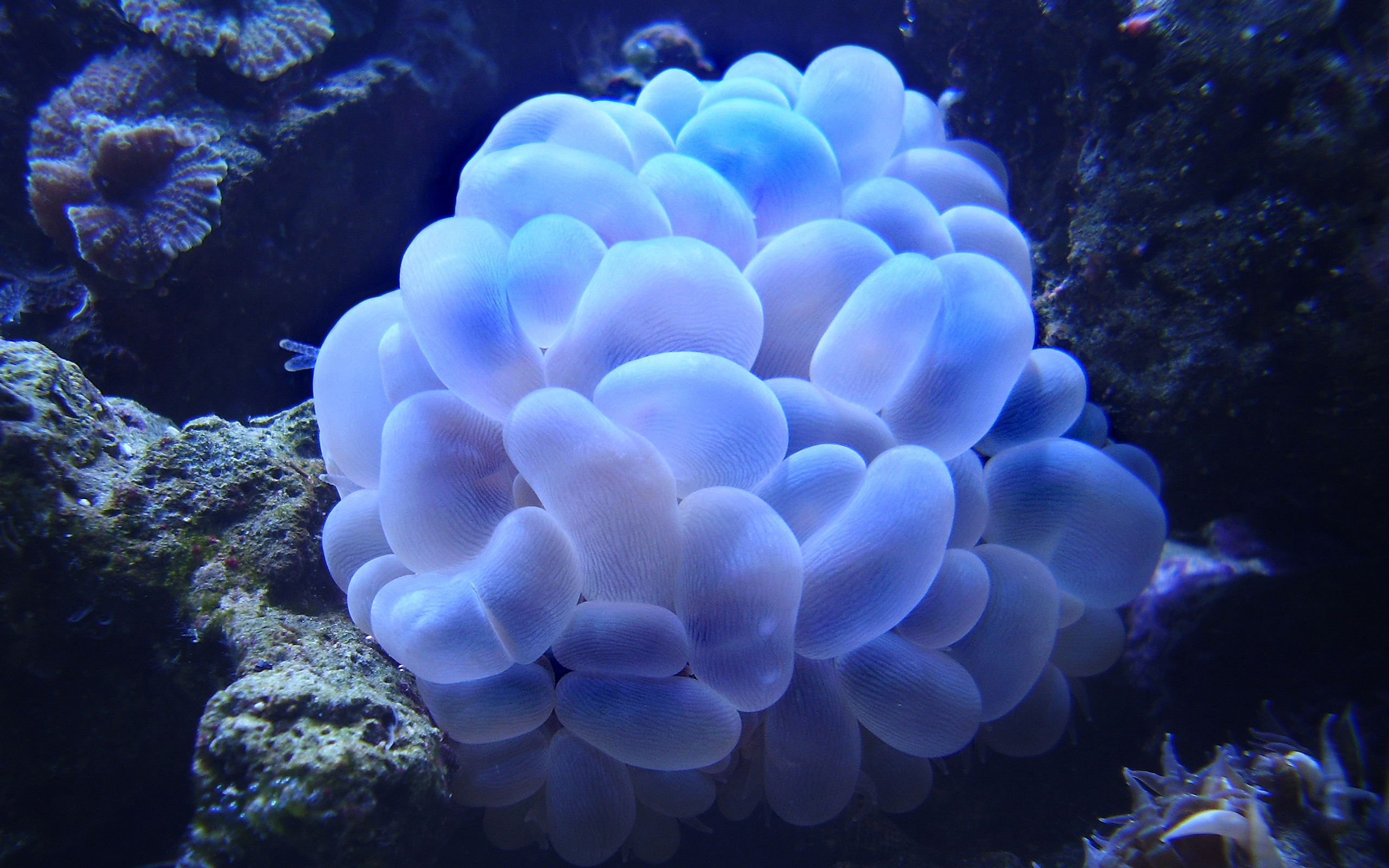
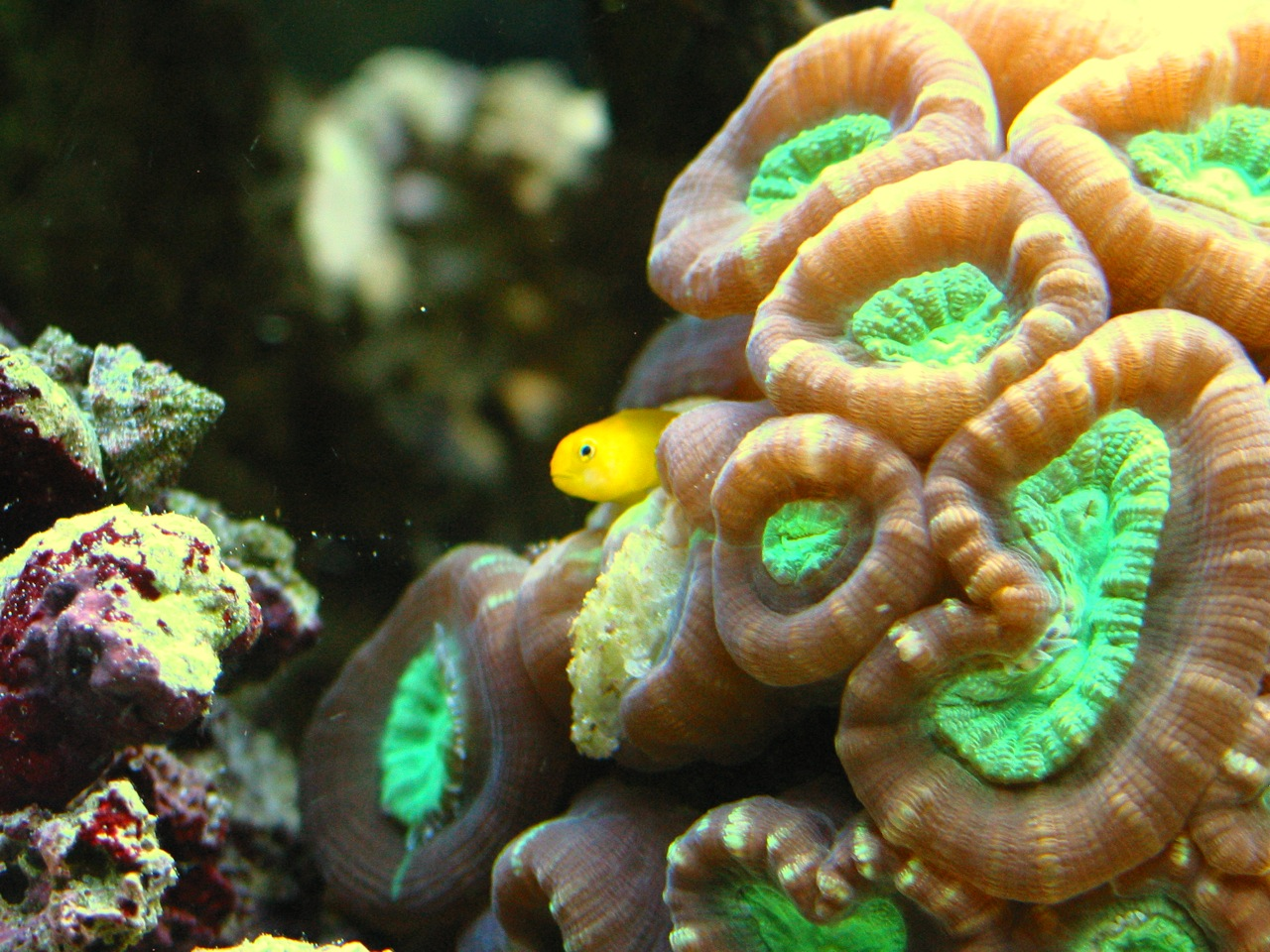
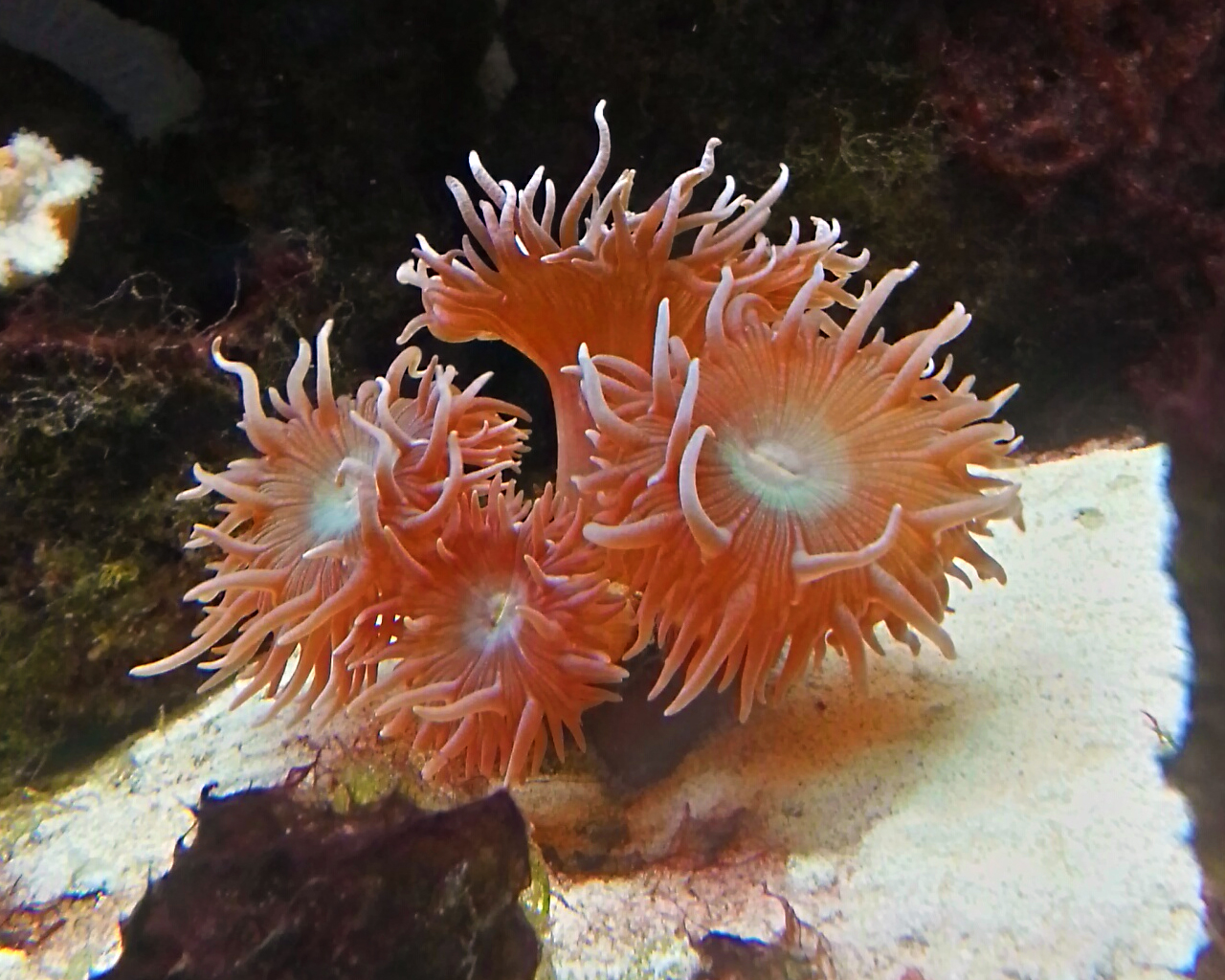
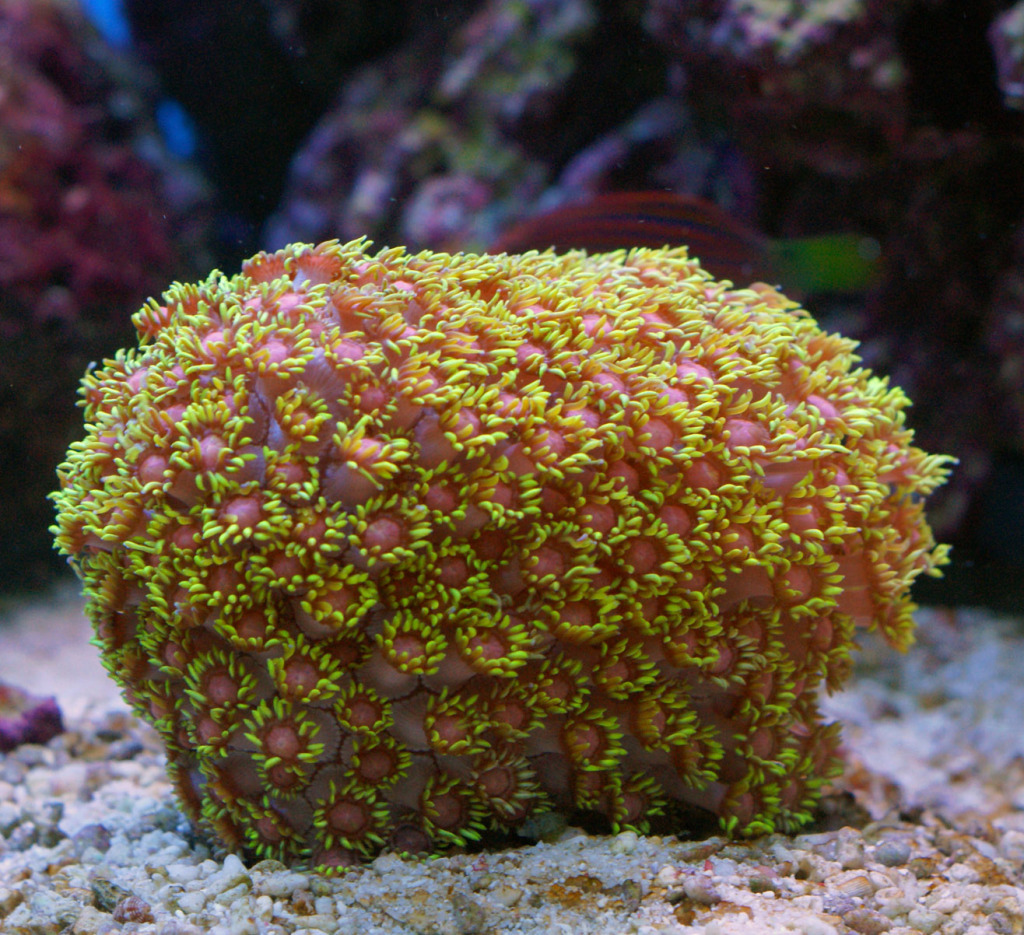
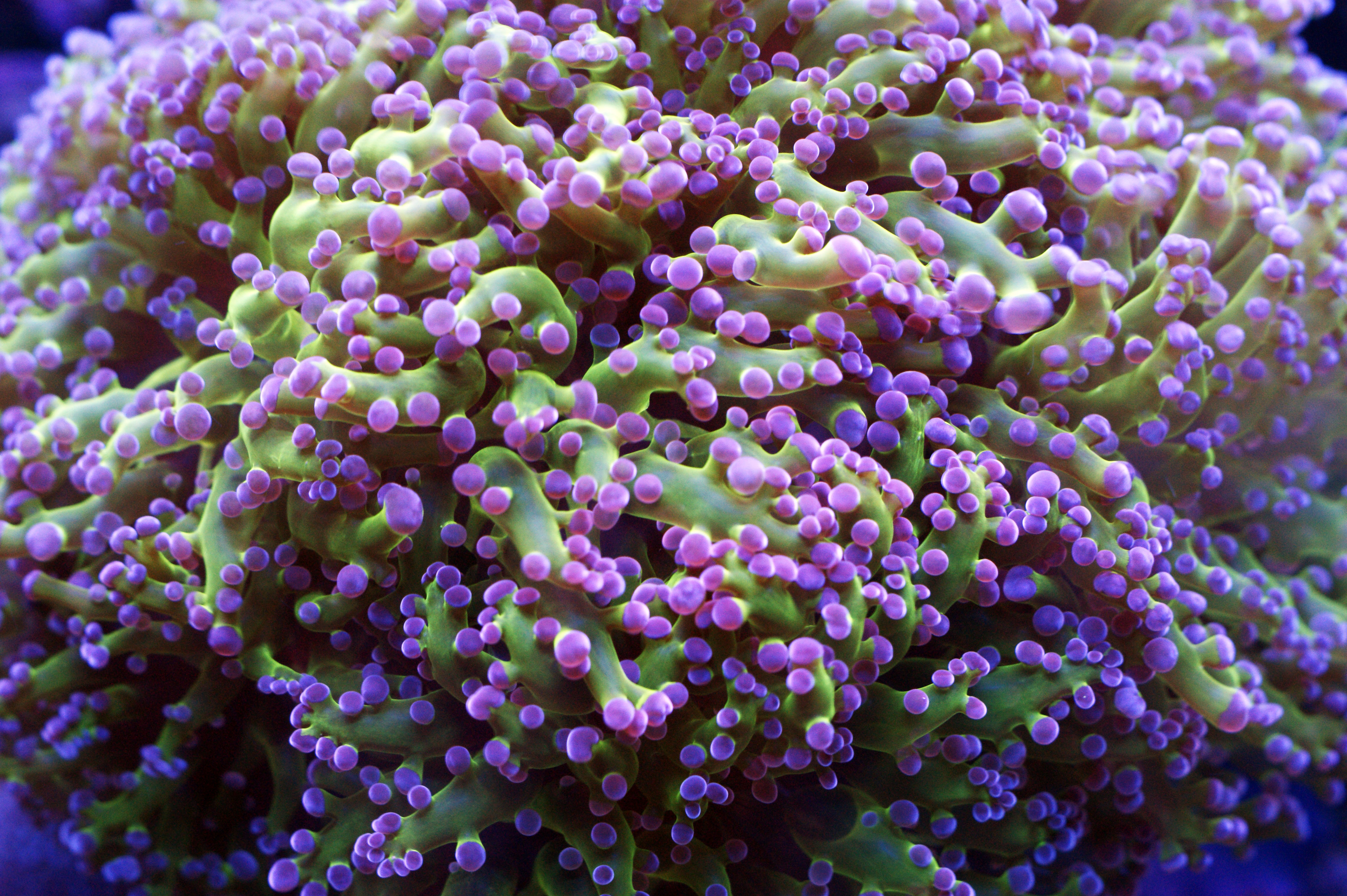
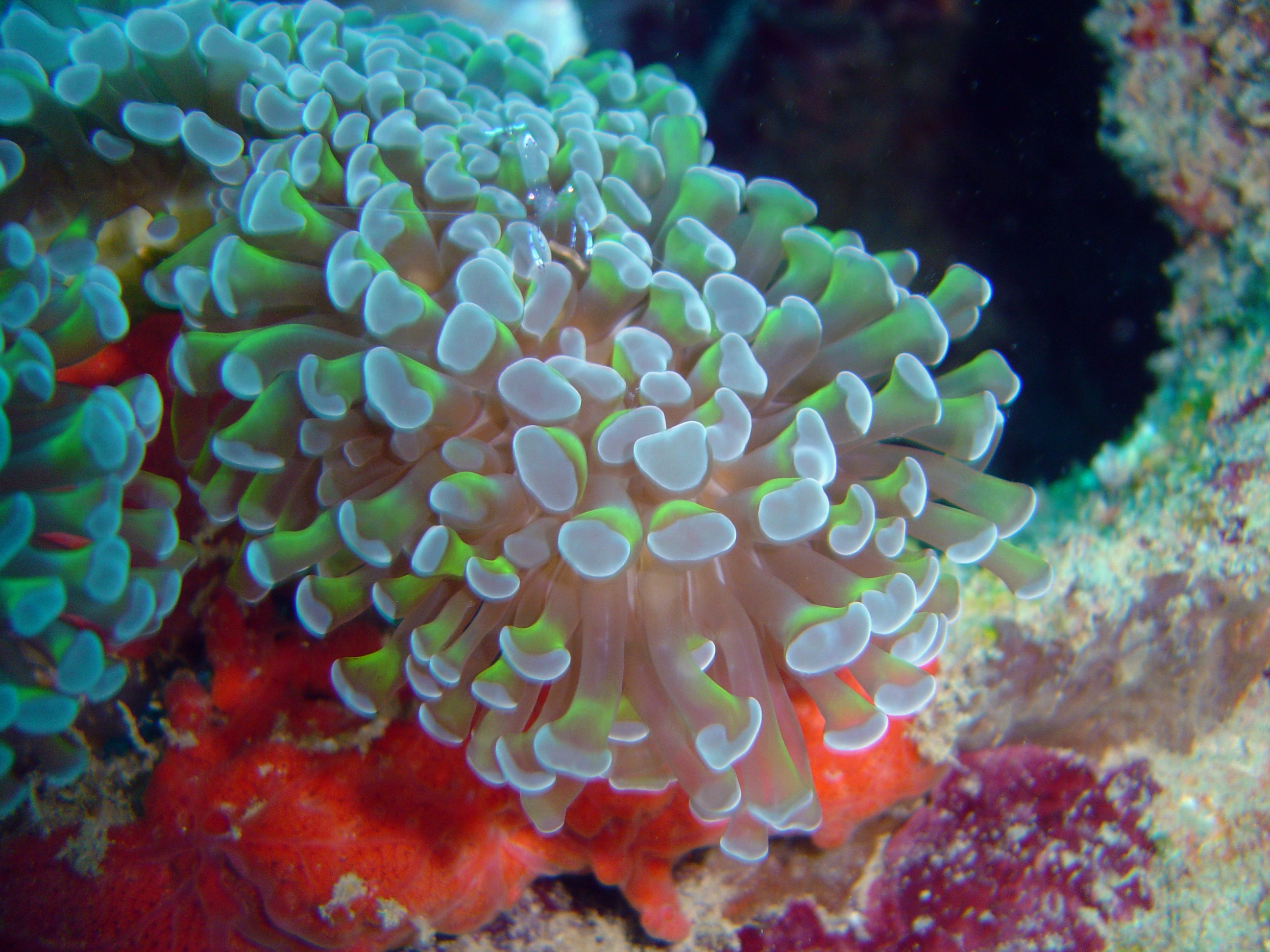
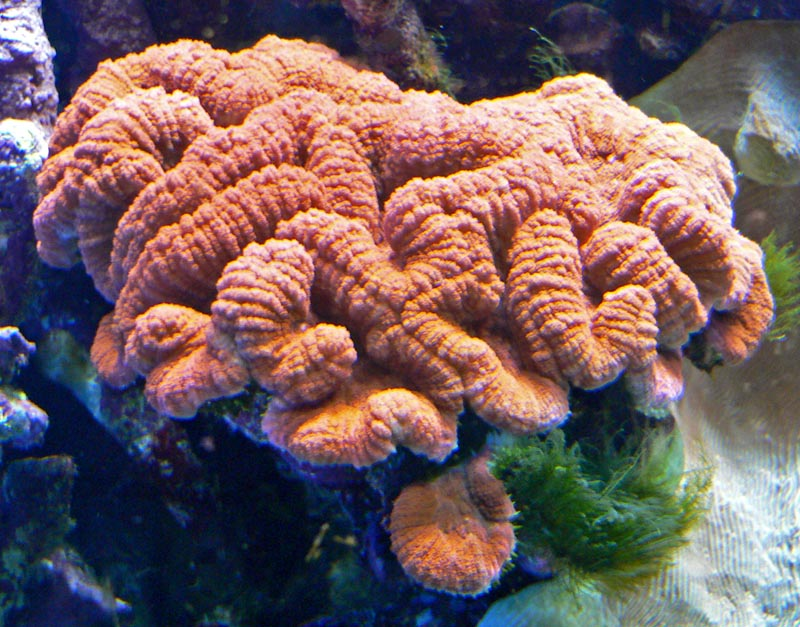
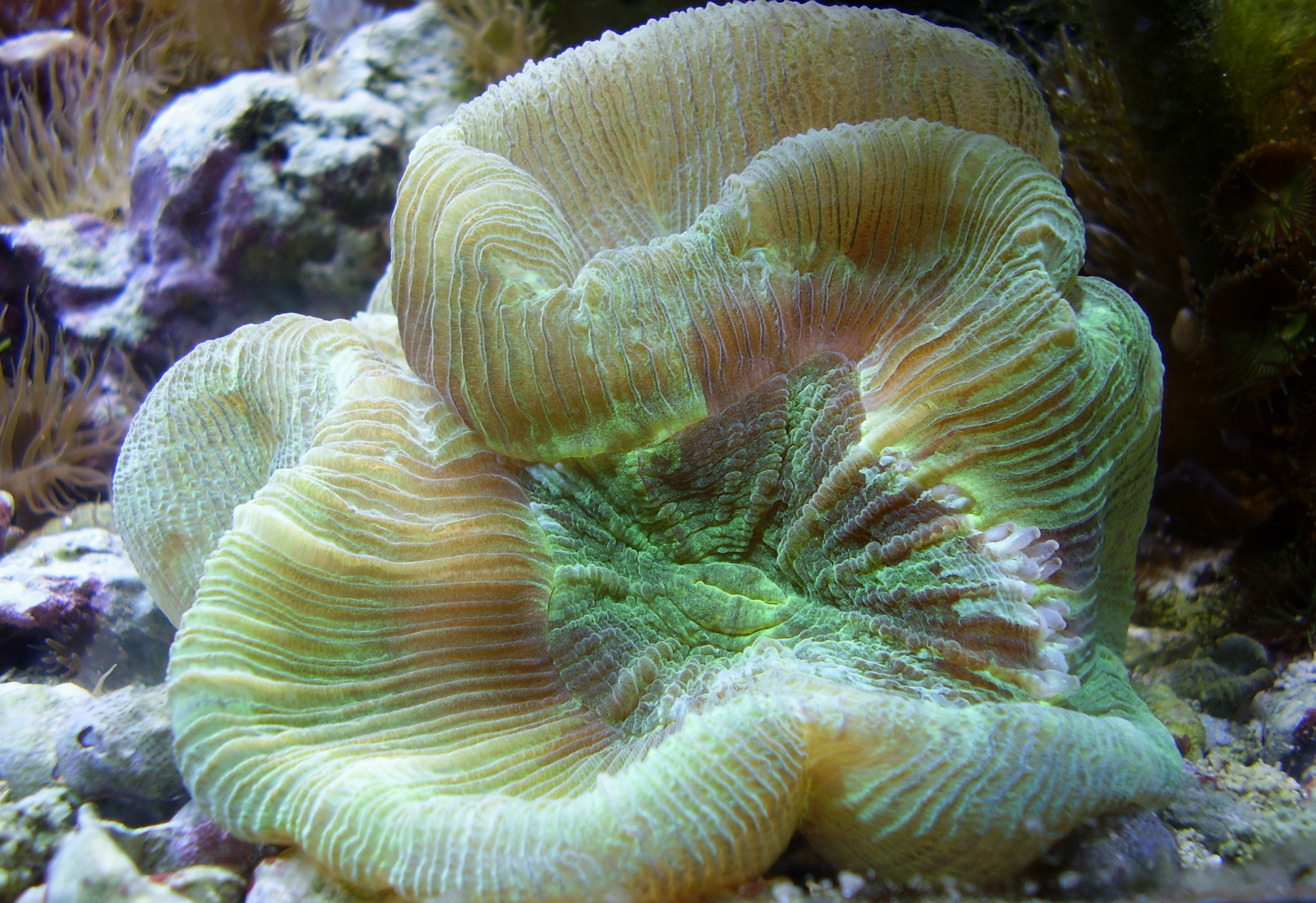
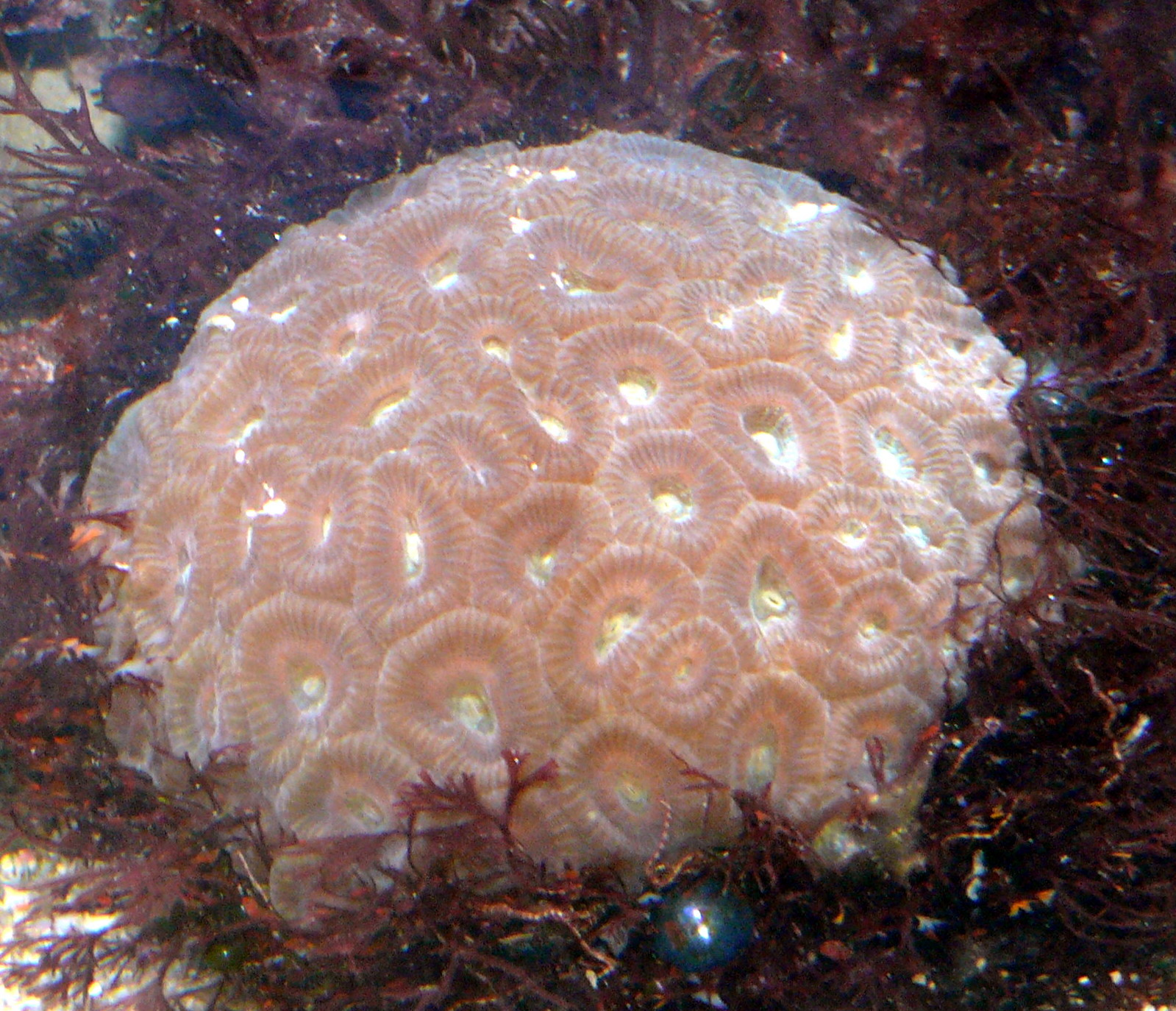
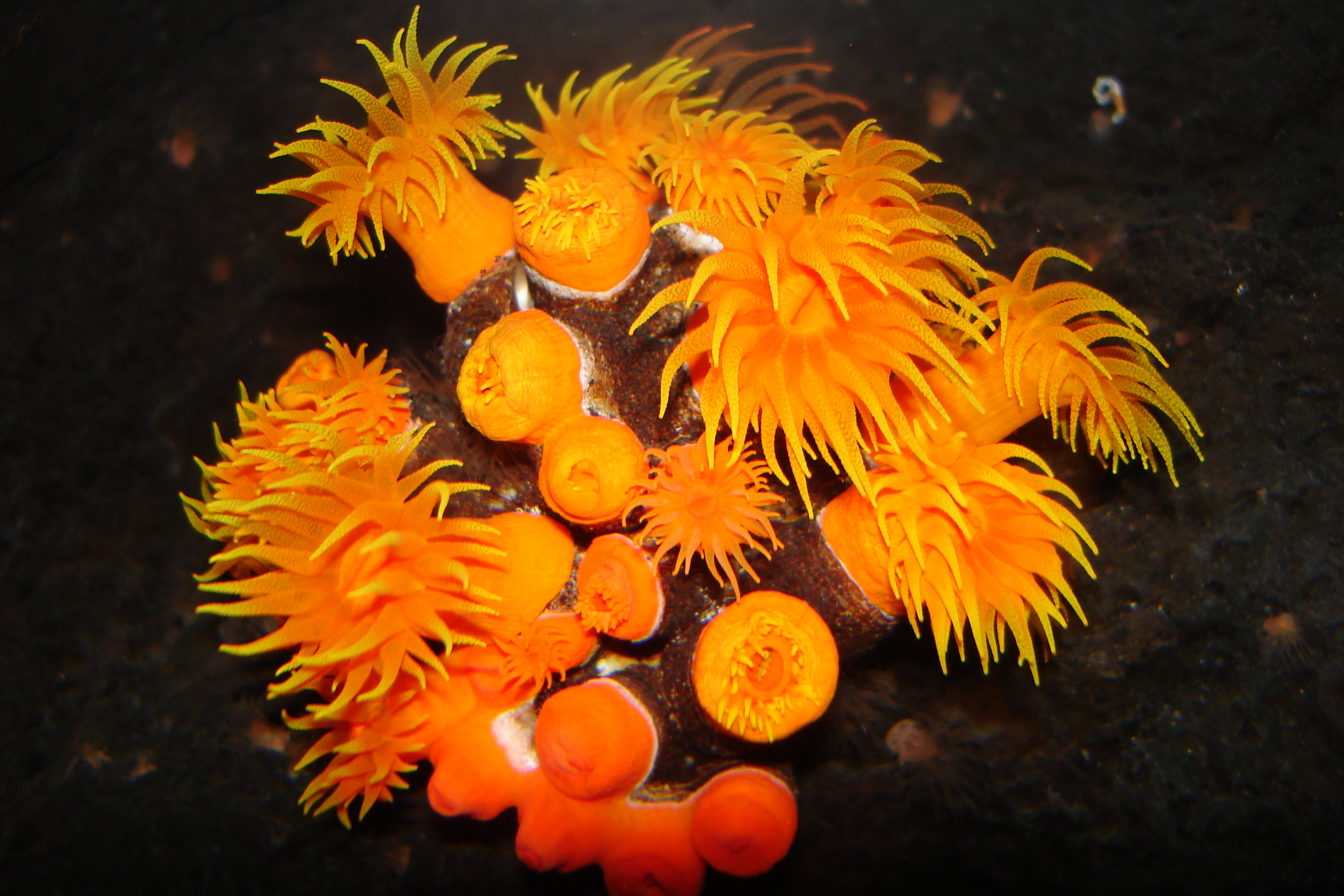
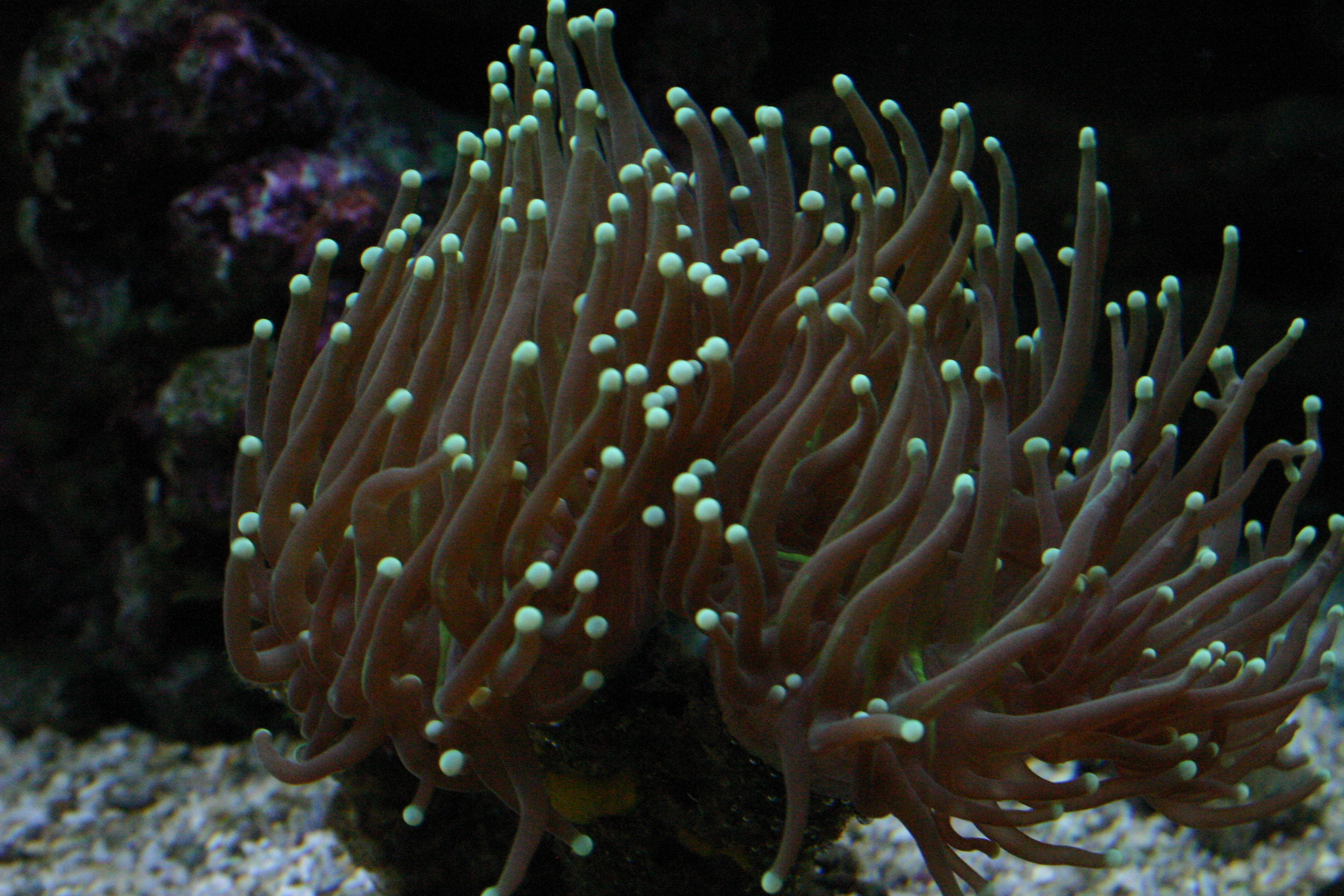
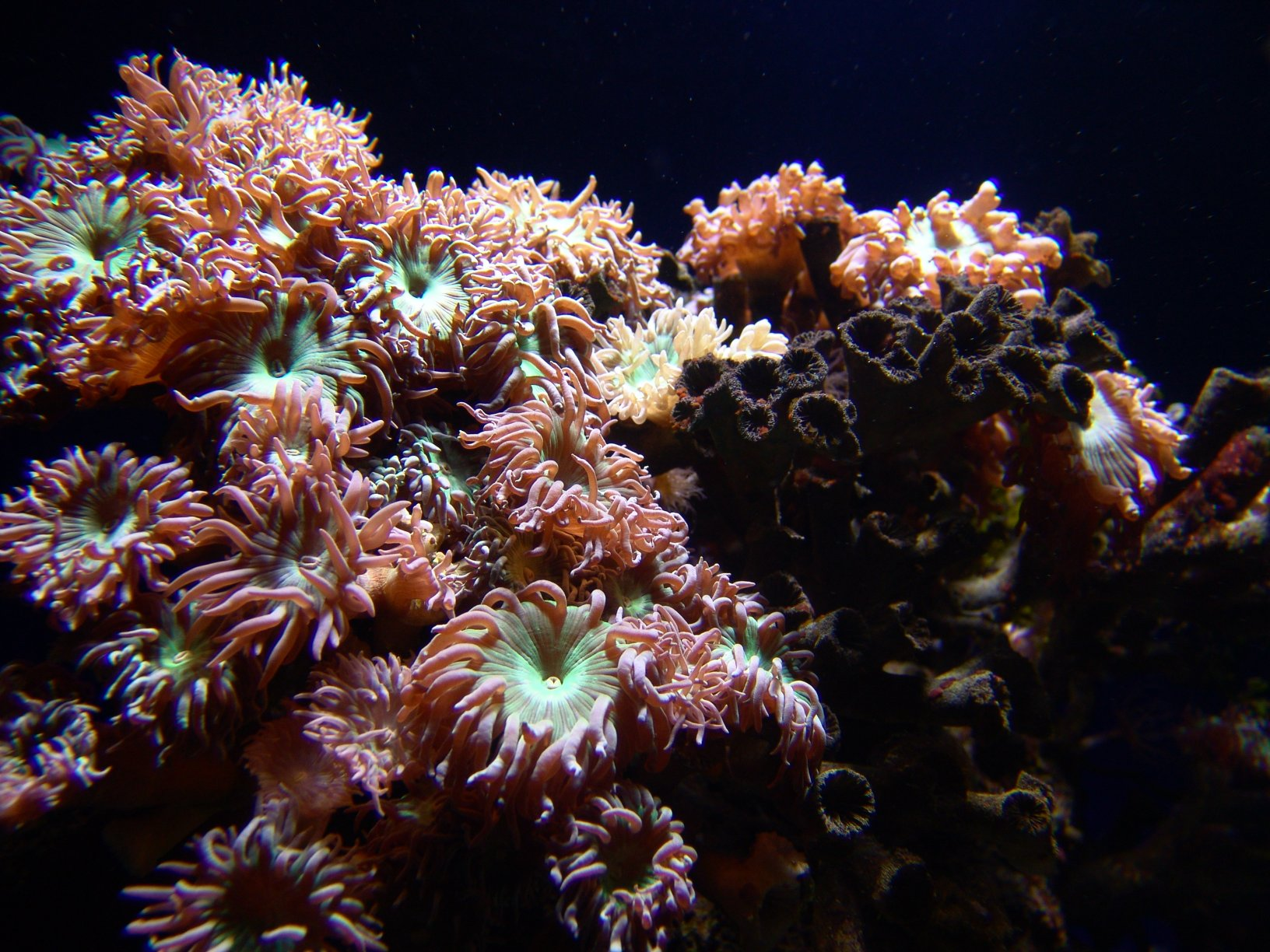
Common name(s)	Image	Taxonomy	Temperament	Care Level	Description	Max size
Black sun coral		Tubastraea micrantha		Expert
Bubble coral		Plerogyra sinuosa	Aggressive	Easy
Candy cane coral		Caulastrea furcata	Peaceful	Easy
Elegance coral		Catalaphyllia jardinei	Aggressive	Moderate
Flowerpot coral		Goniopora sp.	Aggressive	Difficult
Frogspawn coral		Euphyllia divisa	Aggressive	Moderate
Hammer coral, Anchor coral		Euphyllia ancora	Aggressive
Lobed brain coral		Lobophyllia hemprichii	Semi-Aggressive
Open brain coral		Trachyphyllia geoffroyi	Semi-aggressive
Pineapple brain coral, Moon coral		Favia sp.	Aggressive
Sun coral, Orange cup coral		Tubastraea sp., often Tubastrea aurea	Peaceful	Expert
Torch coral		Euphyllia glabrescens	Aggressive
Whisker coral, Duncan coral		Duncanopsammia axifuga	Peaceful	Easy

=== Small-polyp stony ===
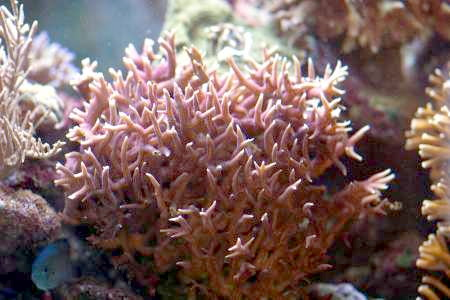
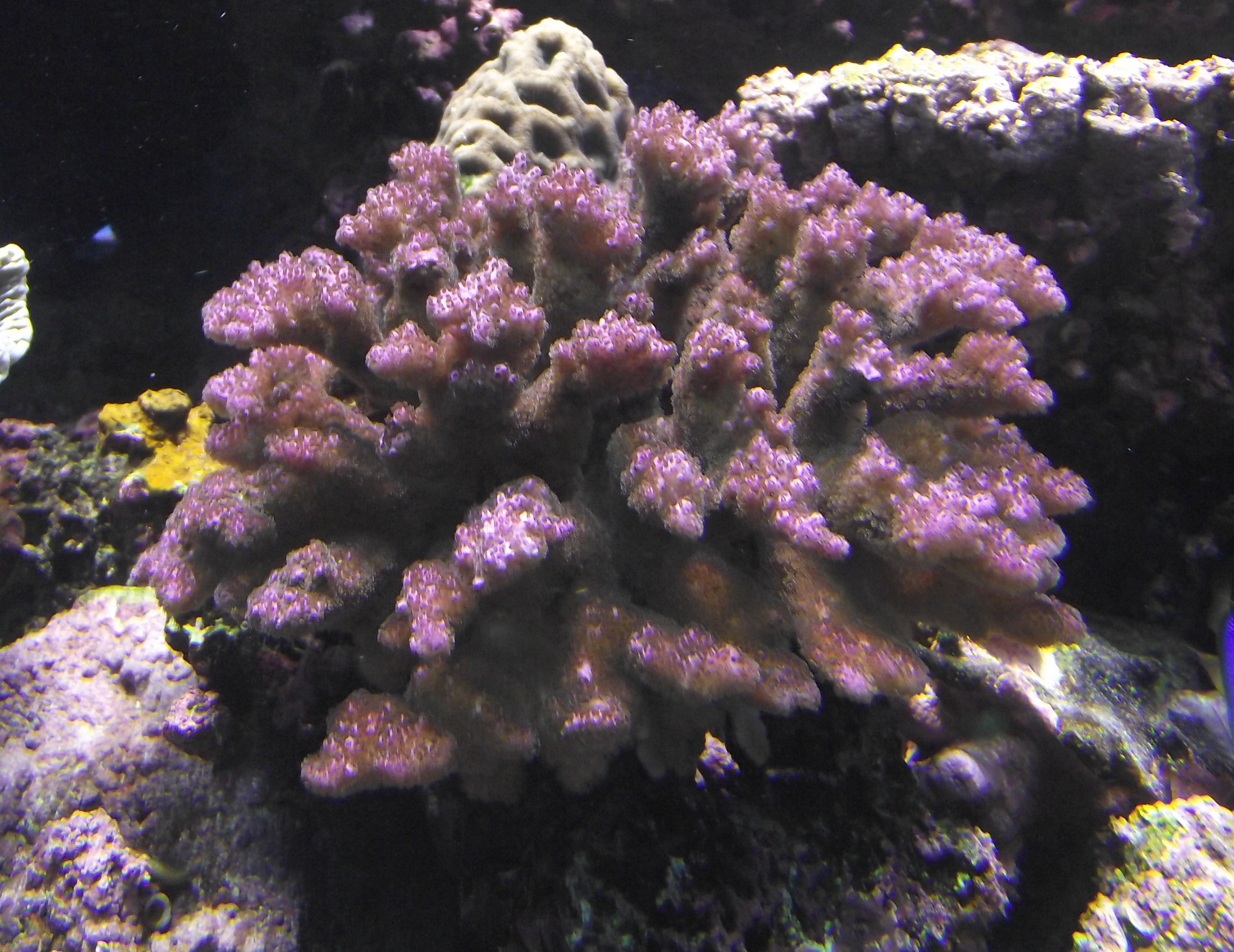
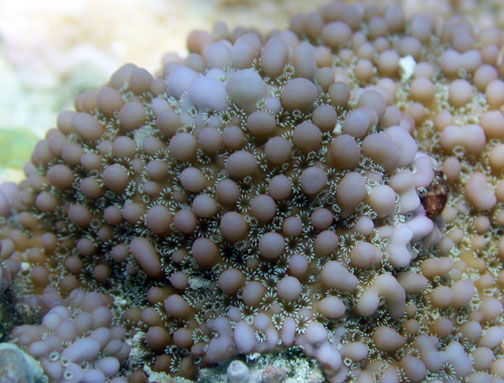
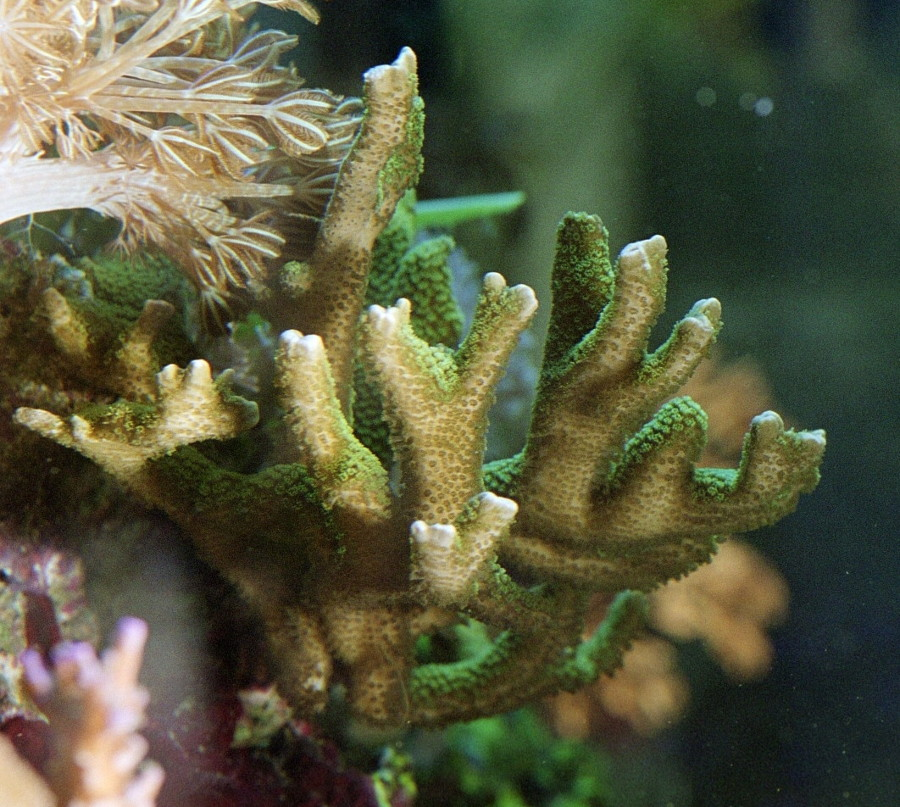
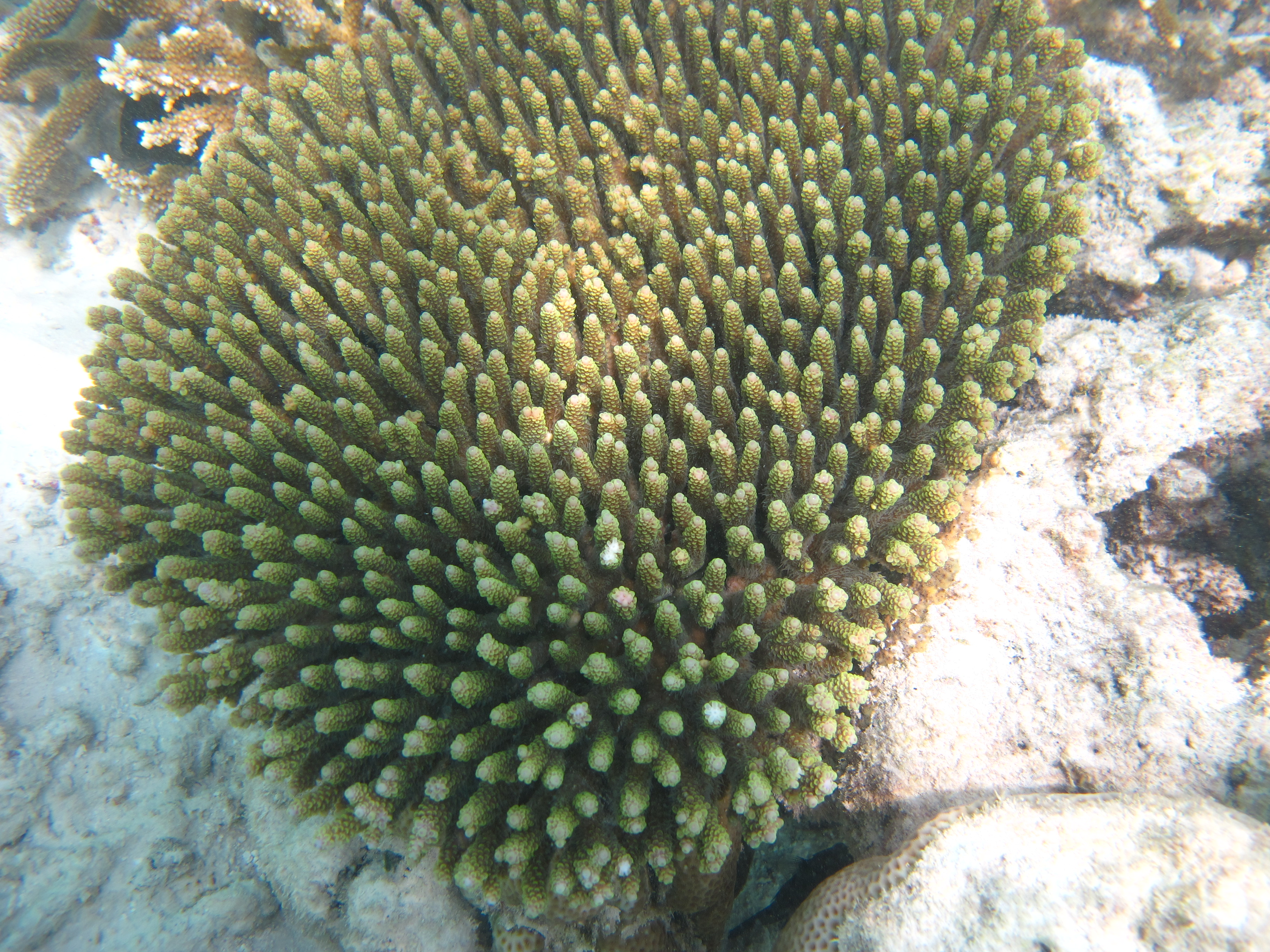
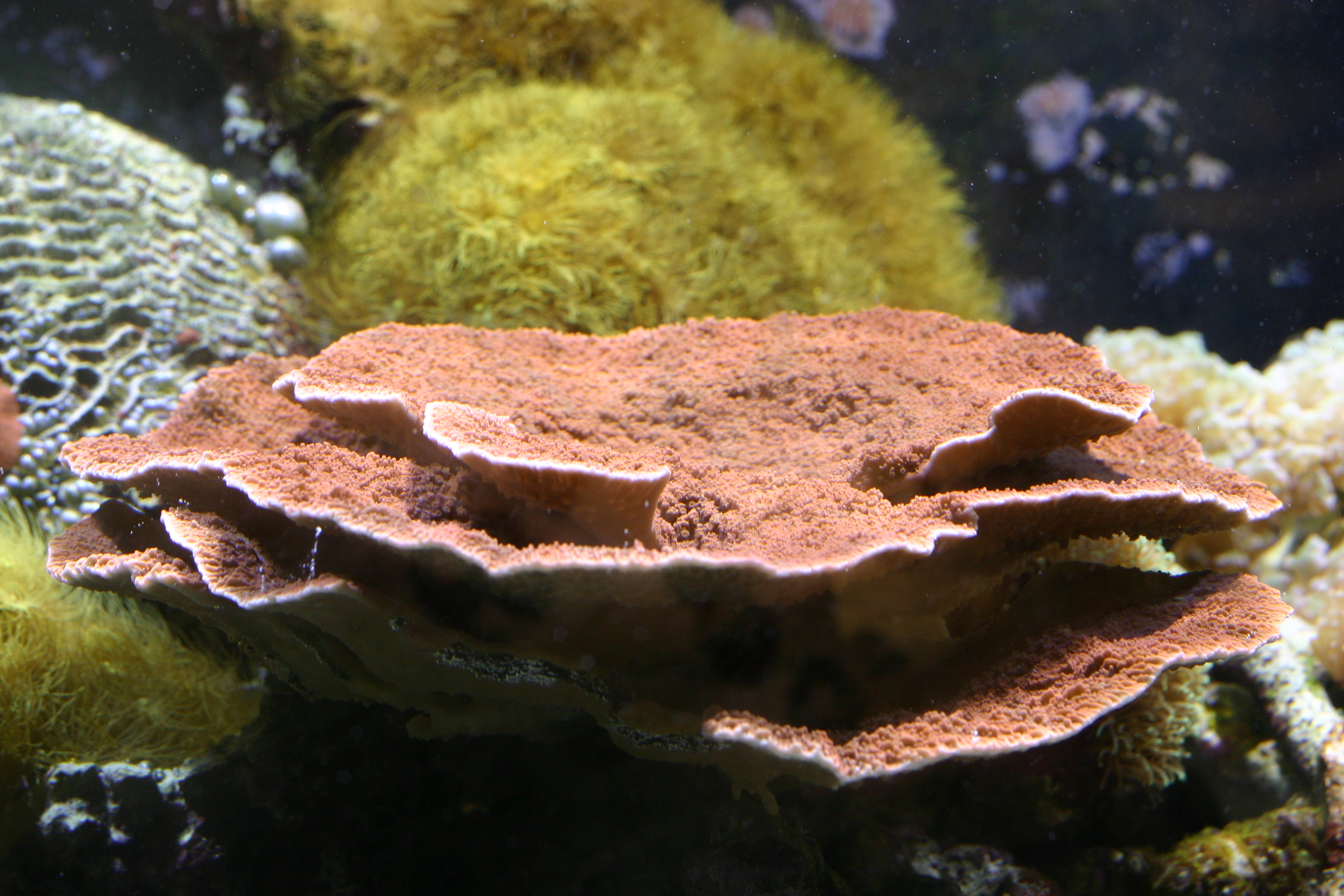
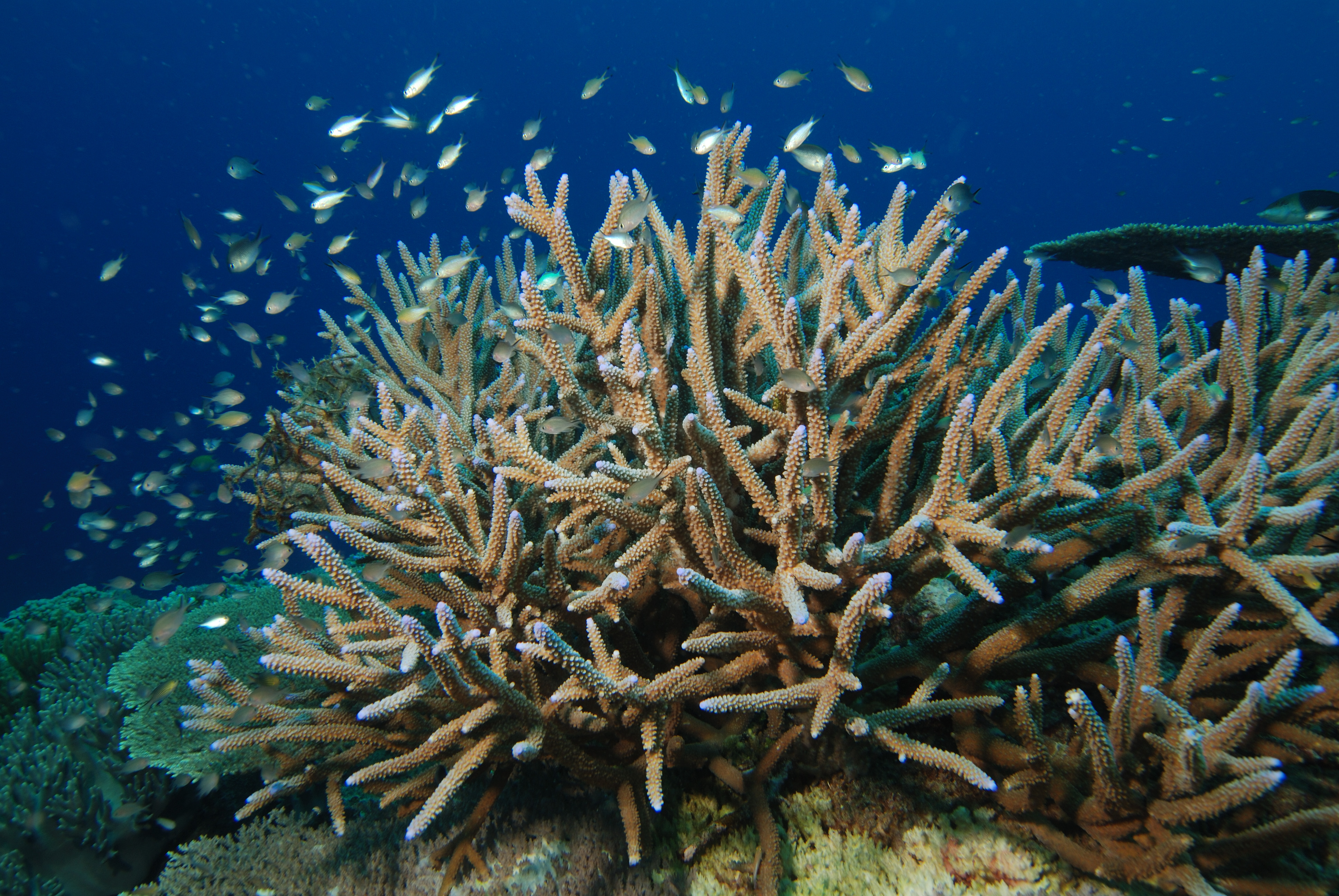
Common name	Image	Taxonomy	Temperament	Care level	Description	Max size
Pink bird's nest coral		Seriatopora hystrix
Cauliflower coral		Pocillopora sp., usually Pocillopora damicornis
Dimpled encrusting Montipora		Montipora verrucosa
Finger coral		Montipora digitata and Montipora samarensis
Millepora coral, "Milli" coral		Acropora millepora	Peaceful	Moderate	A popular and readily available species that comes in many color forms. It should not be confused with fire corals of the genus Millepora.
Plating montipora		Montipora capricornis	Peaceful	Moderate
Staghorn coral		Acropora cervicornis	Peaceful	Difficult	A very rare species, it is generally not available to the average hobby aquarist due to its critically endangered status. They would likely make good aquarium specimens, but can only be obtained with a special license.

=== Soft corals ===
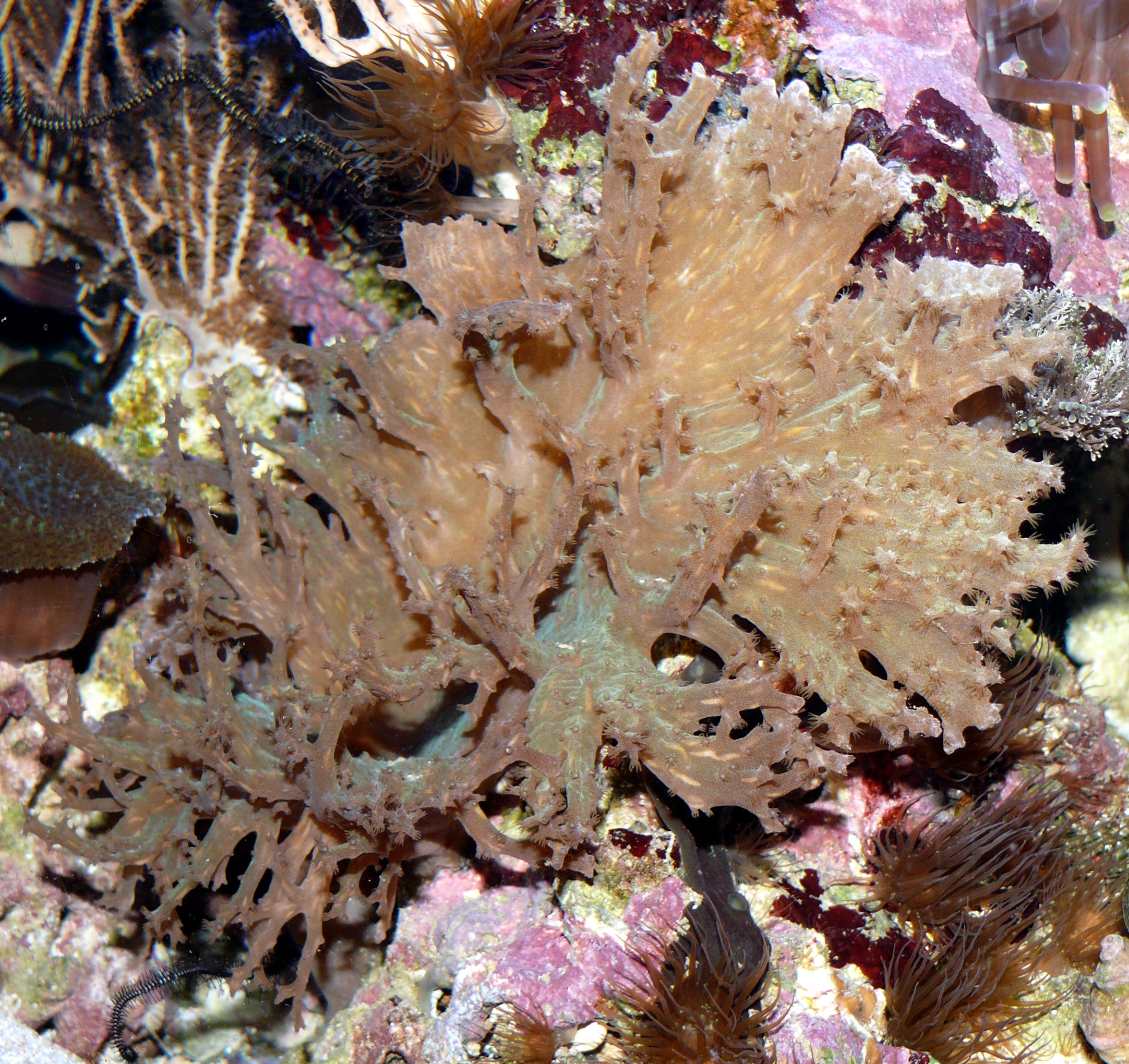
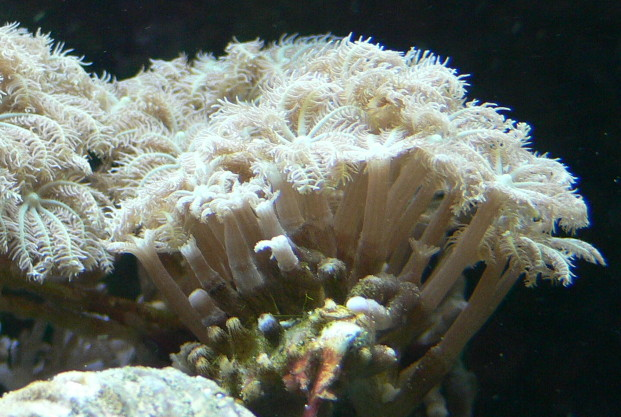
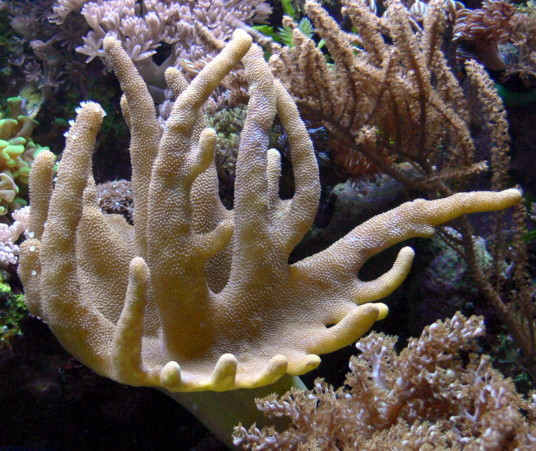
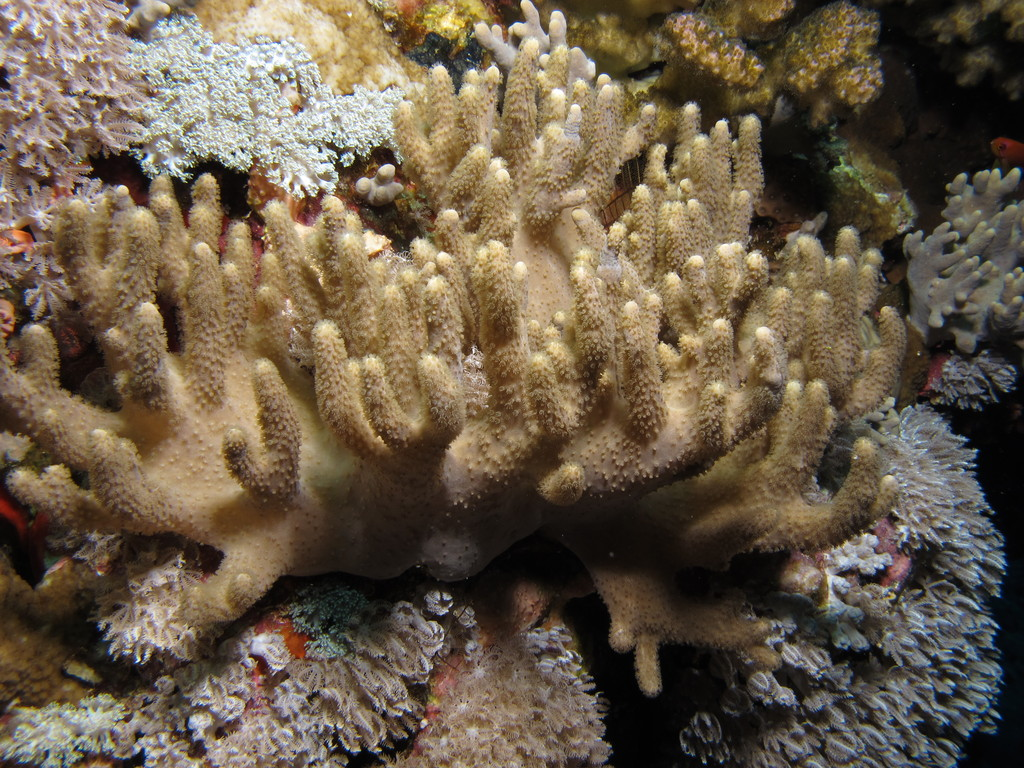
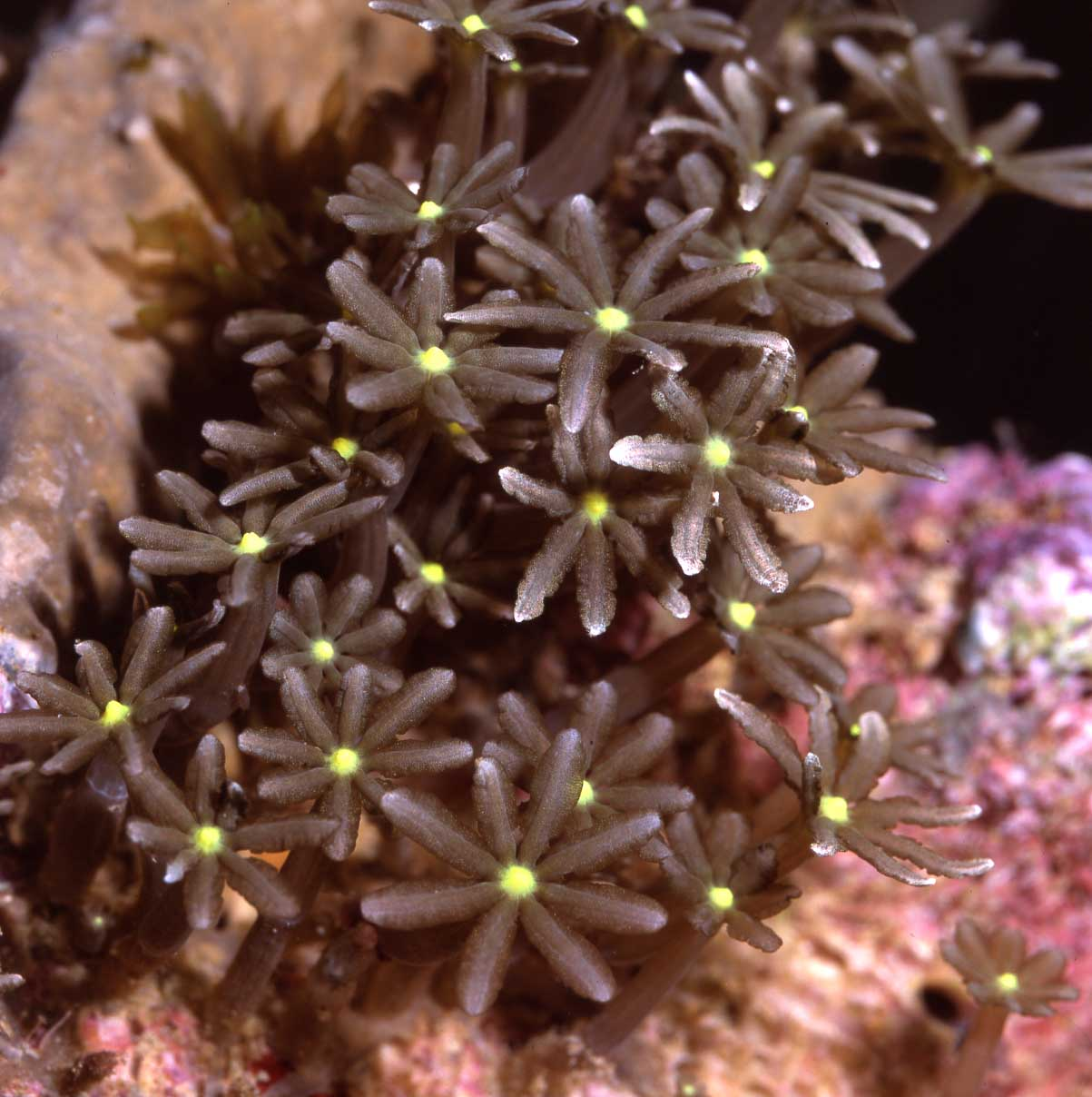
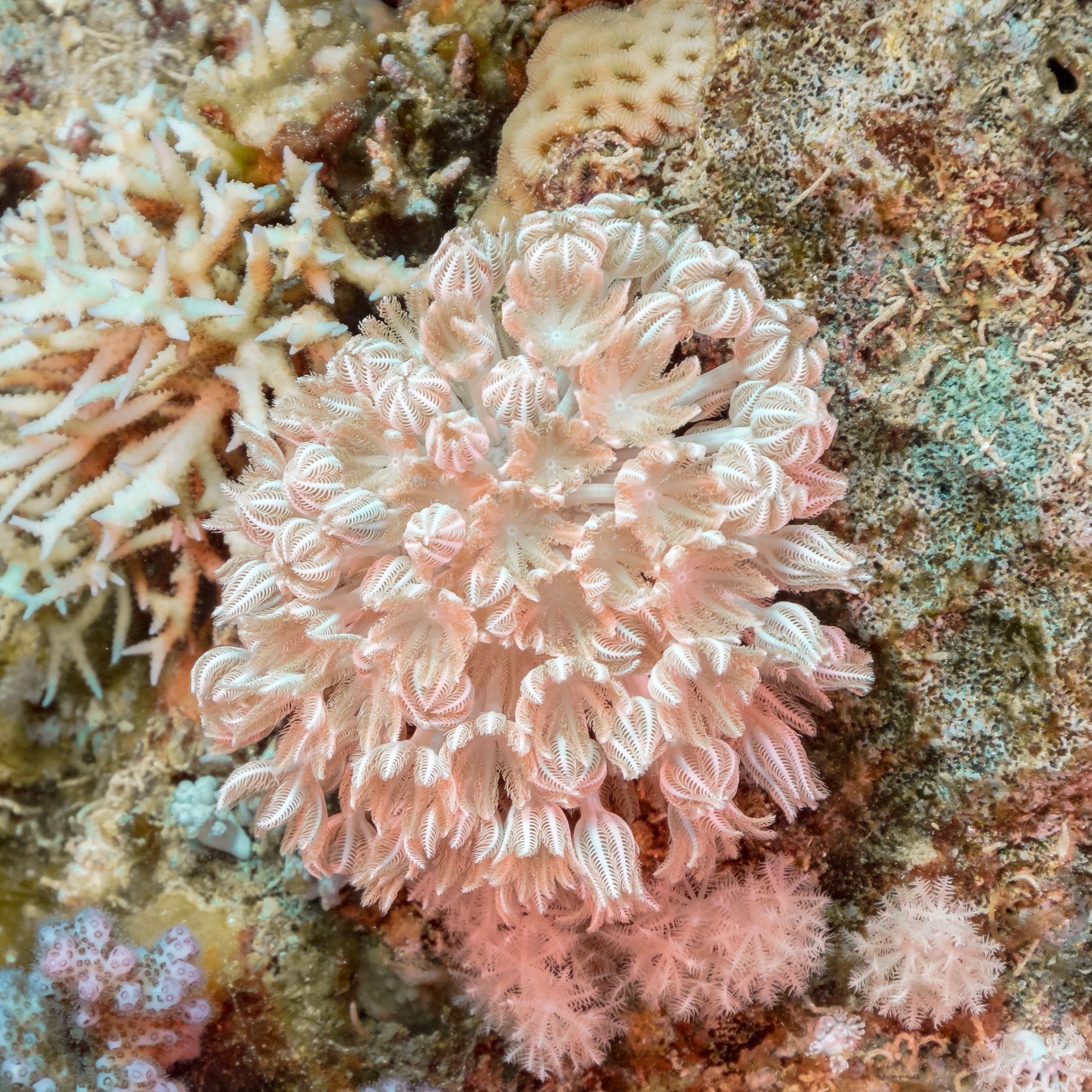
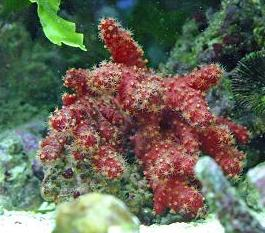
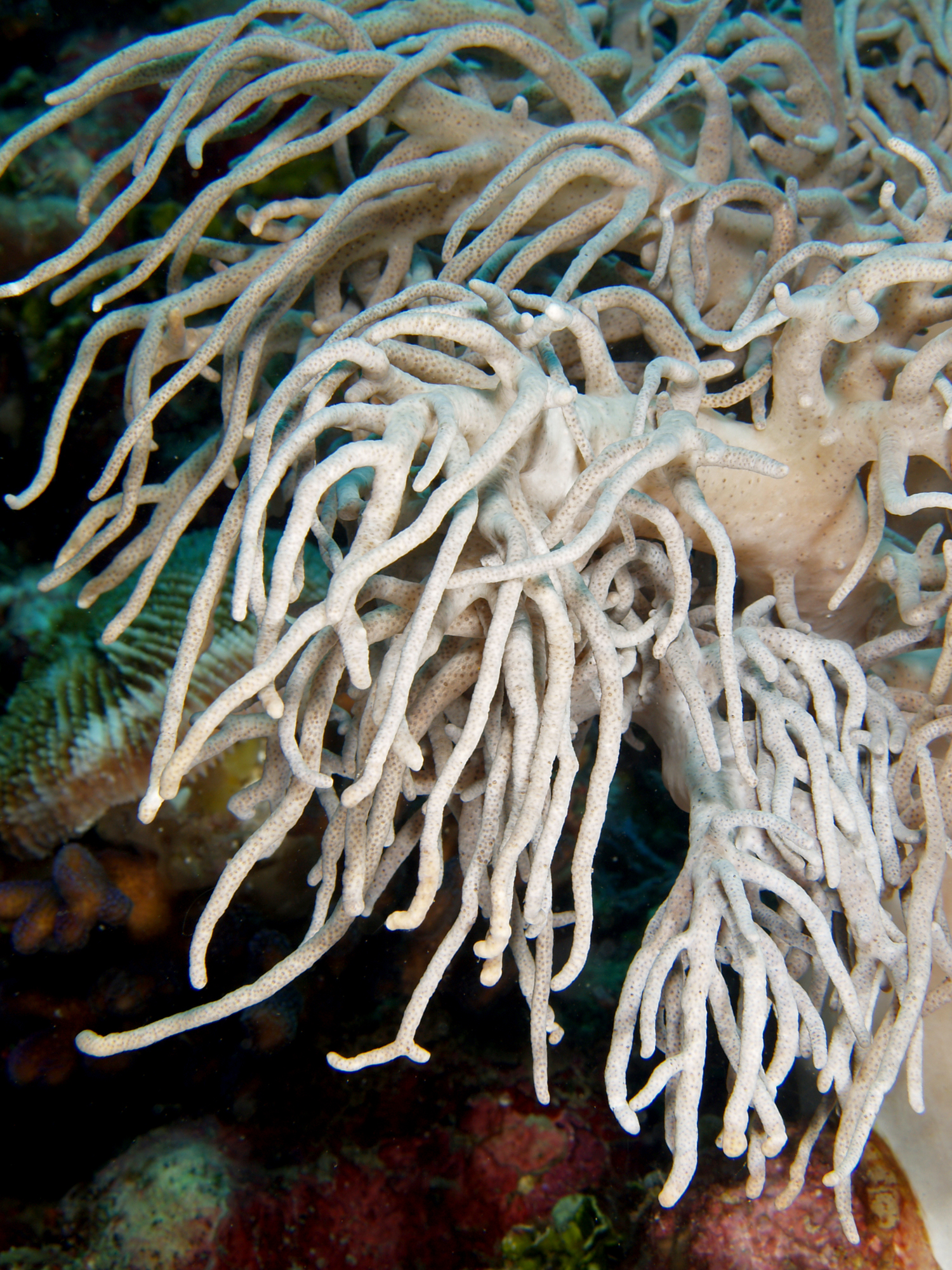
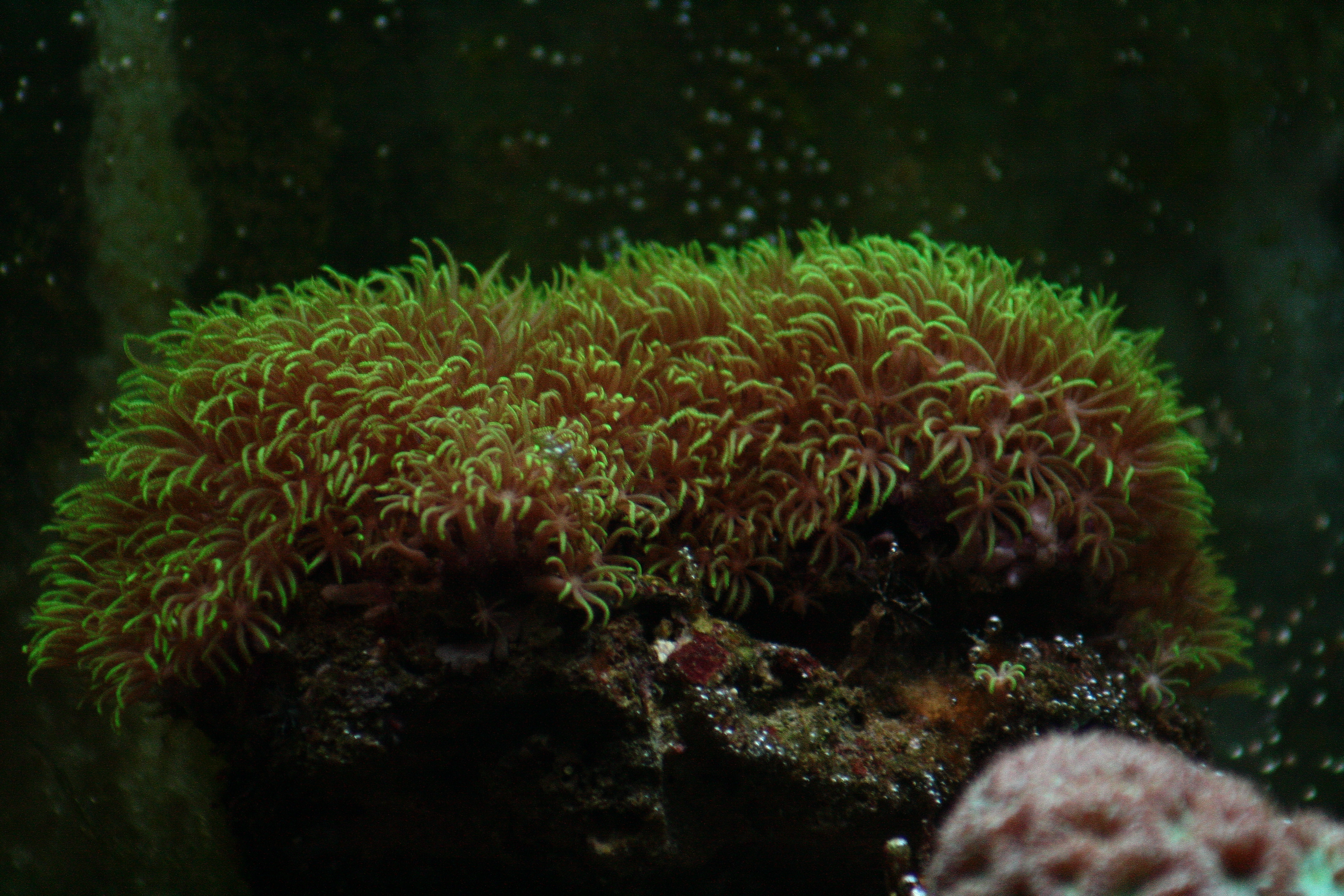
Common name(s)	Image	Taxonomy	Temperament	Care Level	Description	Max size
Cabbage leather coral		Sinularia brassica and Sinularia dura	Semi-aggressive	Easy
Clove polyps, Daisy polyps		Clavularia sp	Peaceful	Easy
Devil's hand leather coral		Lobophytum sp.	Peaceful to Semi-aggressive	Easy
Finger leather coral		Sinularia sp.	Semi-aggressive	Easy
Jasmine polyps, Daisy polyps		Knopia	Peaceful	Easy
Pulse coral, Pulsing Xenia		Xenia sp.	Peaceful	Easy	An easy to care for coral known for its prolific asexual reproduction and polyps that actively move their tentacles in a pulsing motion.
Red chili coral		Nephthyigorgia	Peaceful	Expert
Spaghetti leather coral		Sinularia flexibilis	Semi-aggressive	Easy
Star polyps		Clavularia viridis, Pachiclavularia viridis, or Briareum violaceum (taxonomy uncertain)	Peaceful	Easy

=== Zoanthids ===
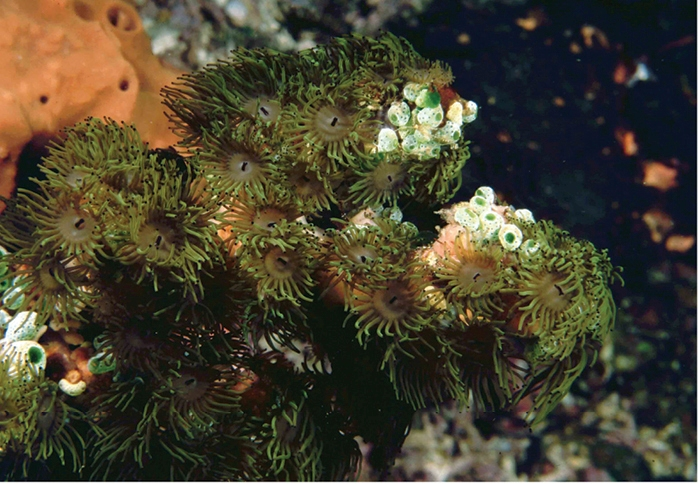
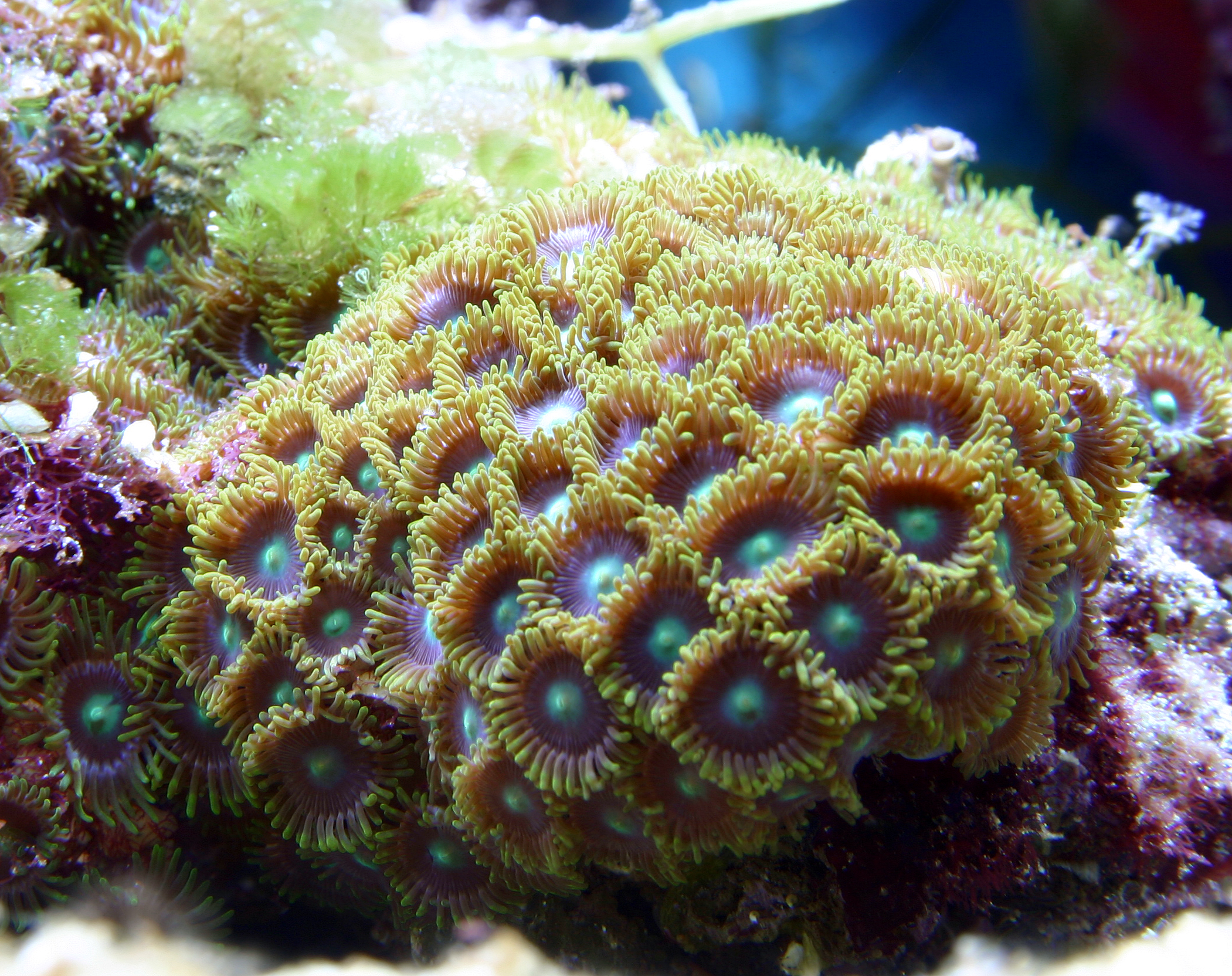
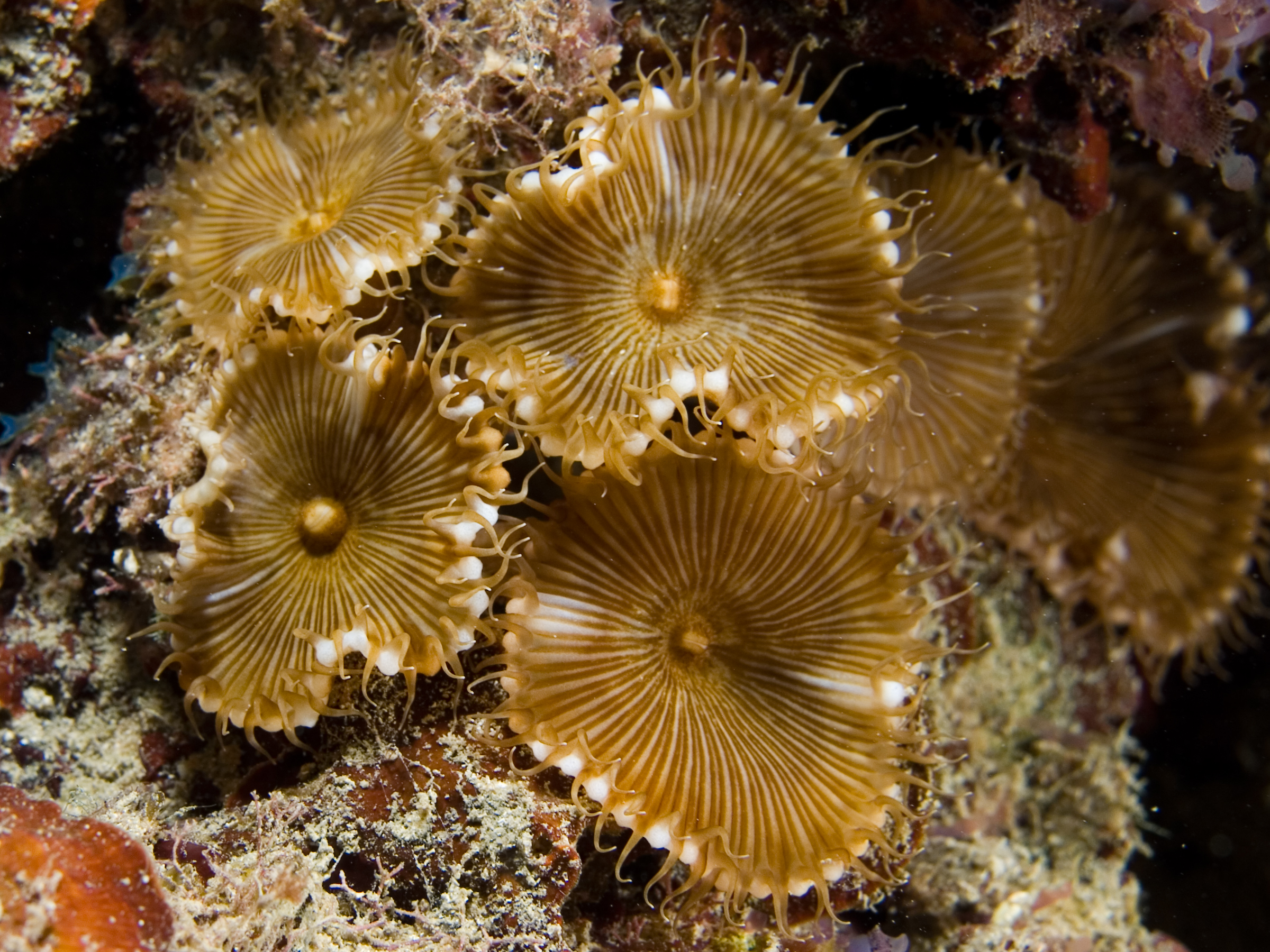
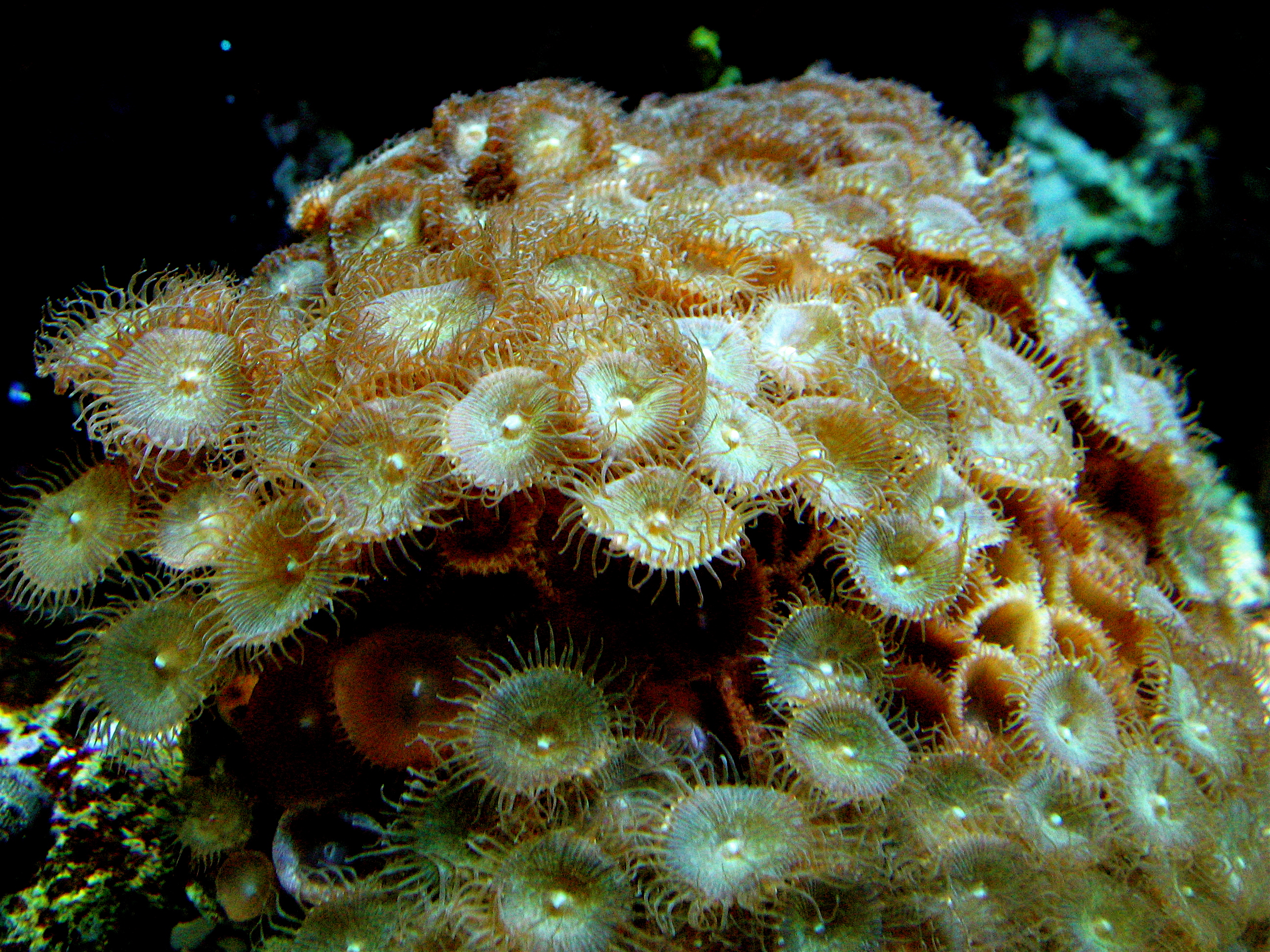
Common name(s)	Image	Taxonomy	Temperament	Care Level	Description	Max size
Stick polyps, Tree polyps		Acrozoanthus
Button polyps, Zoanthids, "Zoas"		Zoanthus	Semi-aggressive	Easy	Common, but pretty, coral that is a mainstay of the reef hobby. Their diversity of color is almost infinite, ranging from pale to full-on rainbow.
Button polyps, Palythoa, "Palys"		Palythoa	Semi-aggressive	Easy	Palythoa are nearly as ubiquitous as Zoanthus in the reef hobby. Their colors are usually more muted, but still attractive.
Button polyps, Protopalythoa		Protopalythoa	Semi-aggressive	Easy	Similar to Palythoa, these may actually be in the same genus due to taxonomic uncertainty.

== Echinoderms ==
=== Sea cucumbers ===
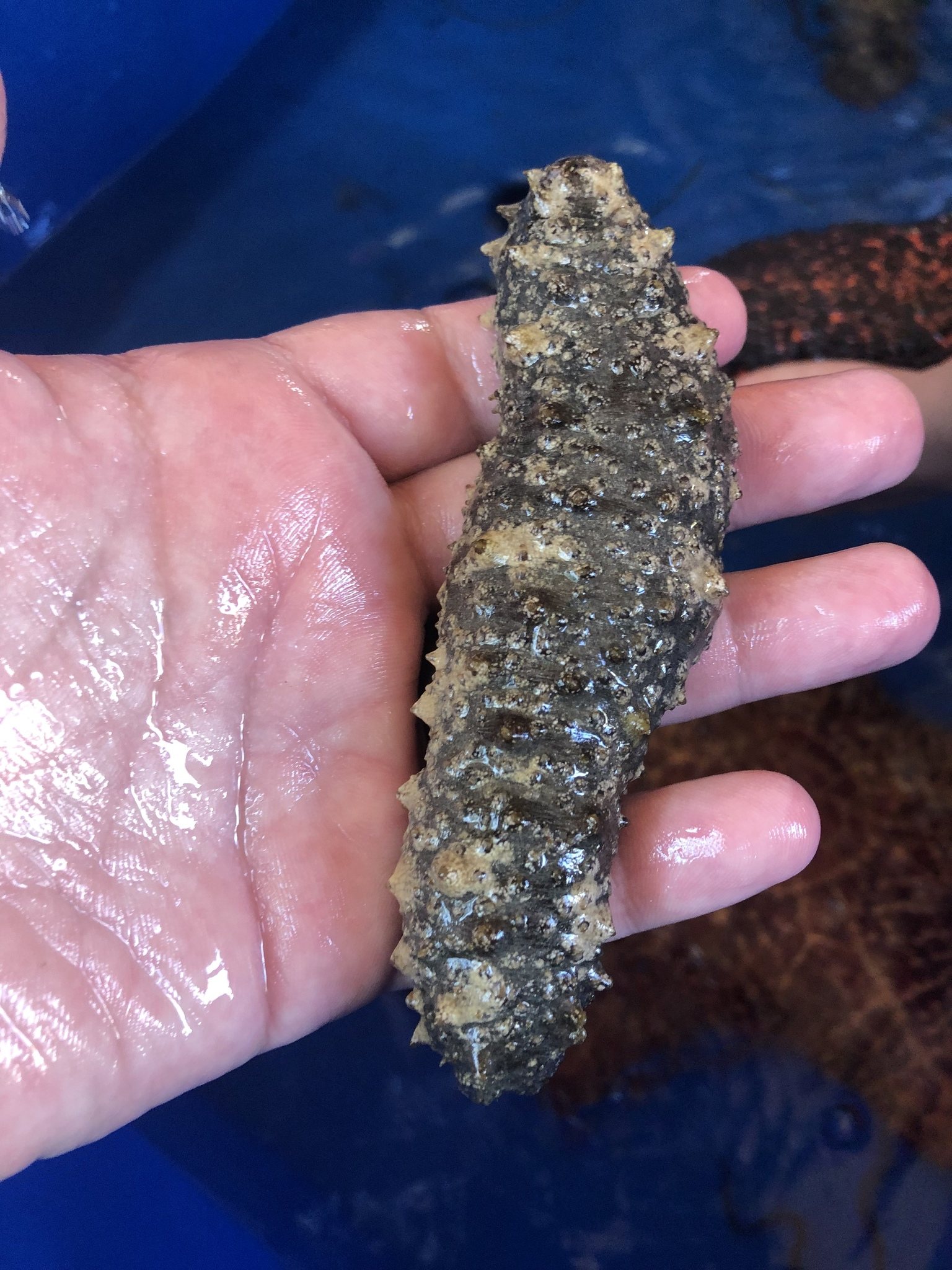
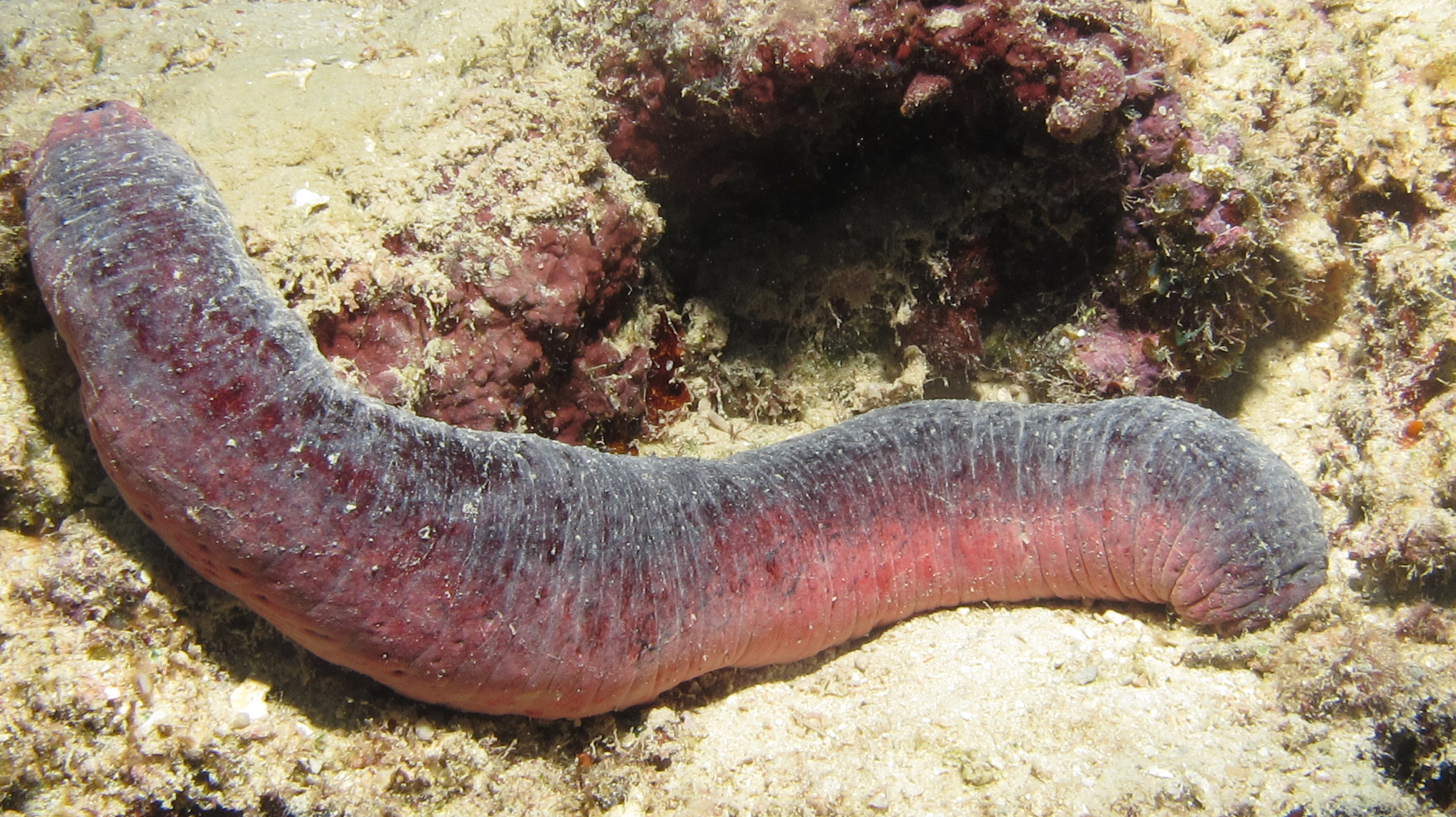
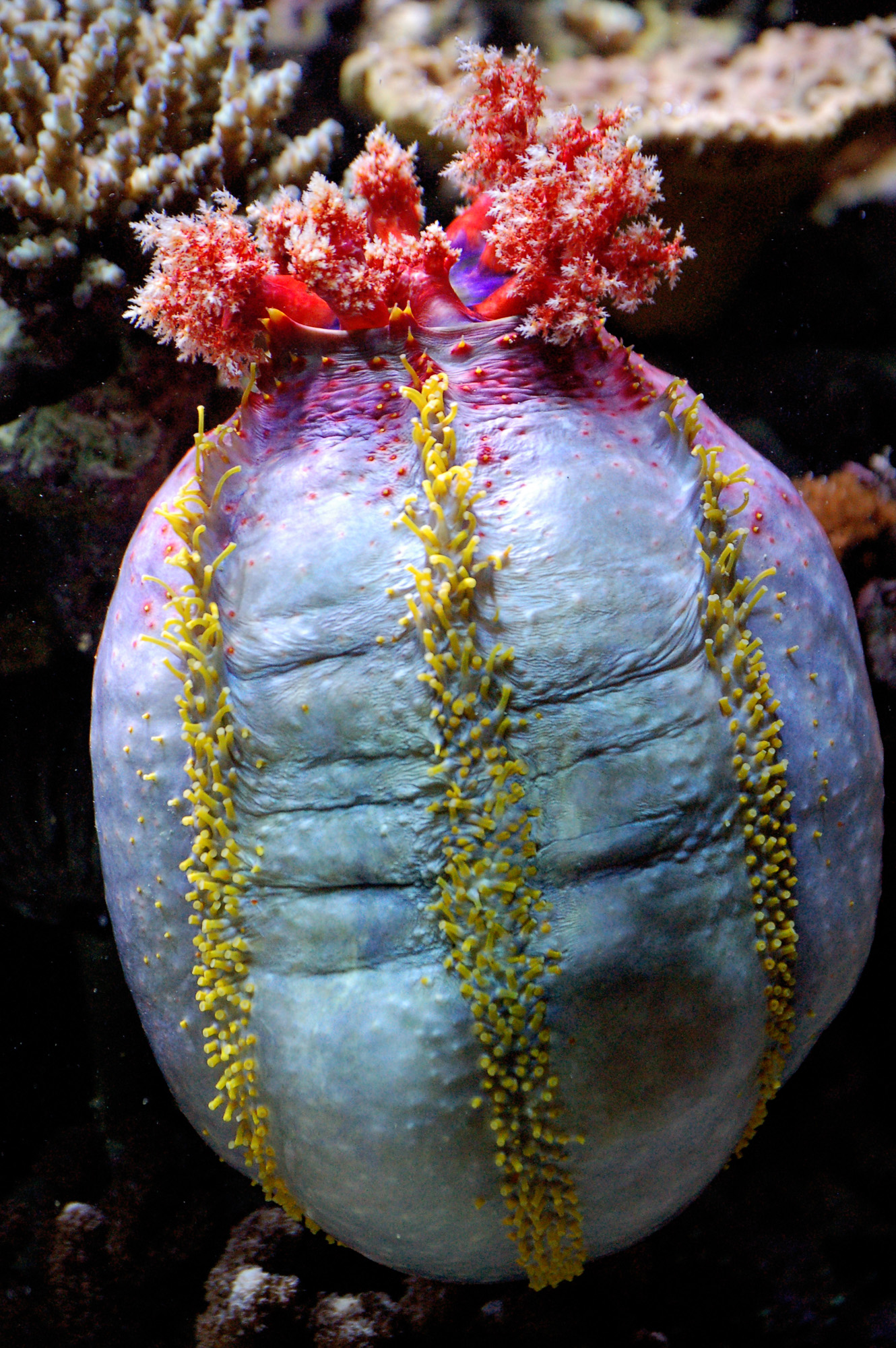
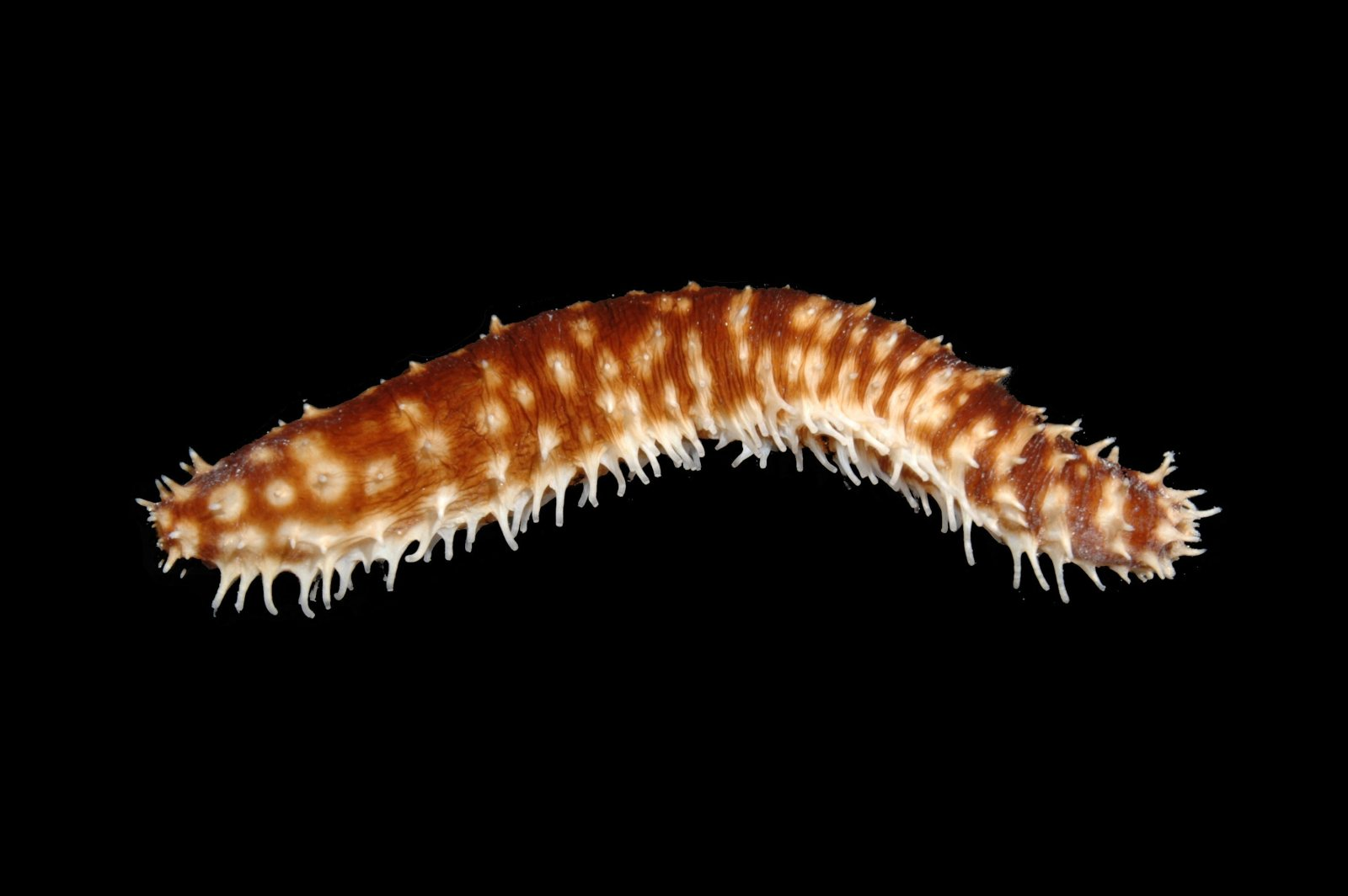
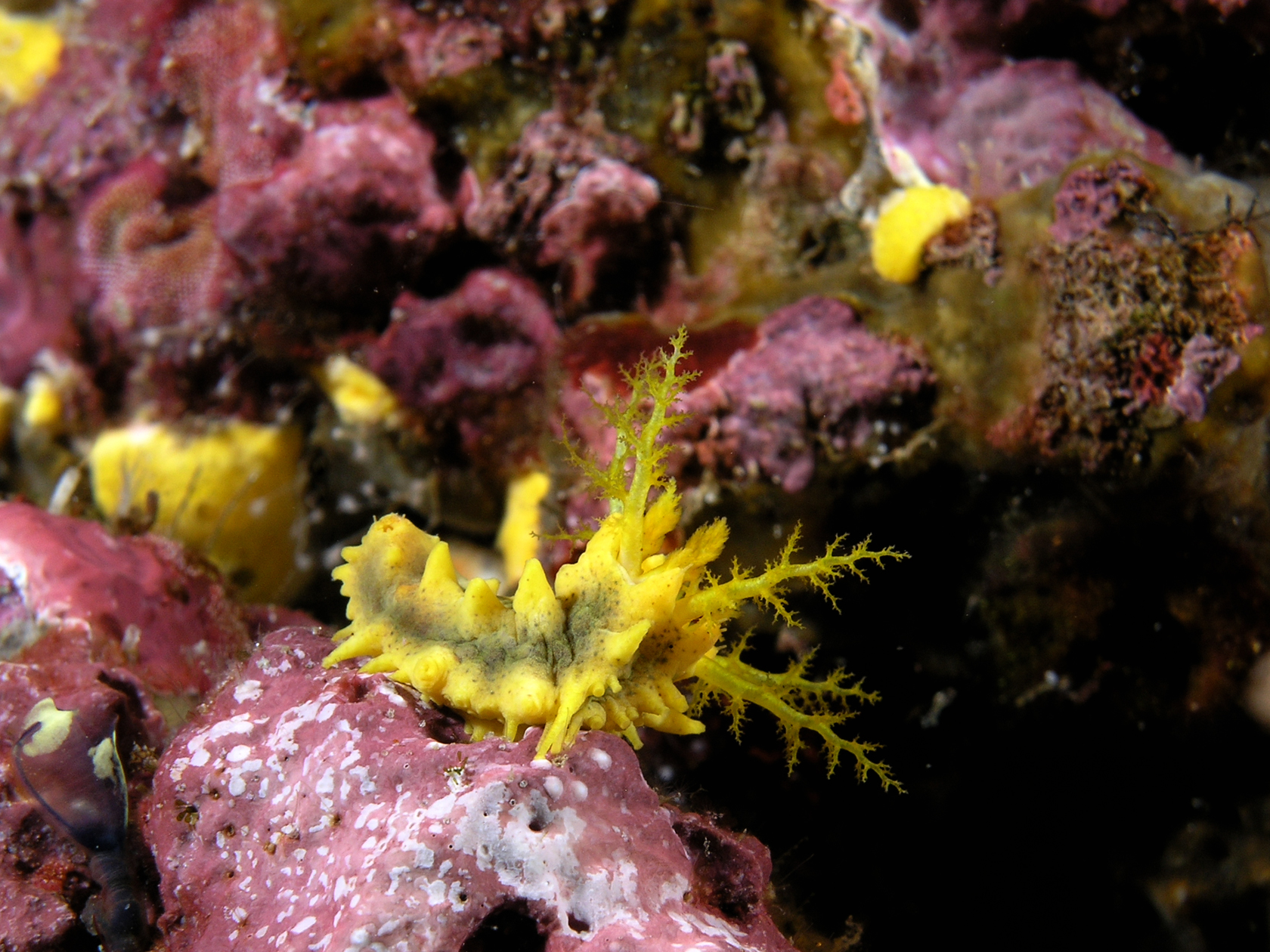
Common name	Image	Taxonomy	Reef safe	Care Level	Description	Max size
Florida sea cucumber		Holothuria floridana
Pink and black sea cucumber		Holothuria edulis	Yes	Easy
Sea apple		Pseudocolochirus axiologus	Maybe	Expert		20 cm (7.9 in)
Tiger tail sea cucumber		Holothuria hilla
Yellow sea cucumber		Colochirus robustus	With care	Expert		7 cm (2.8 in)

=== Starfish ===
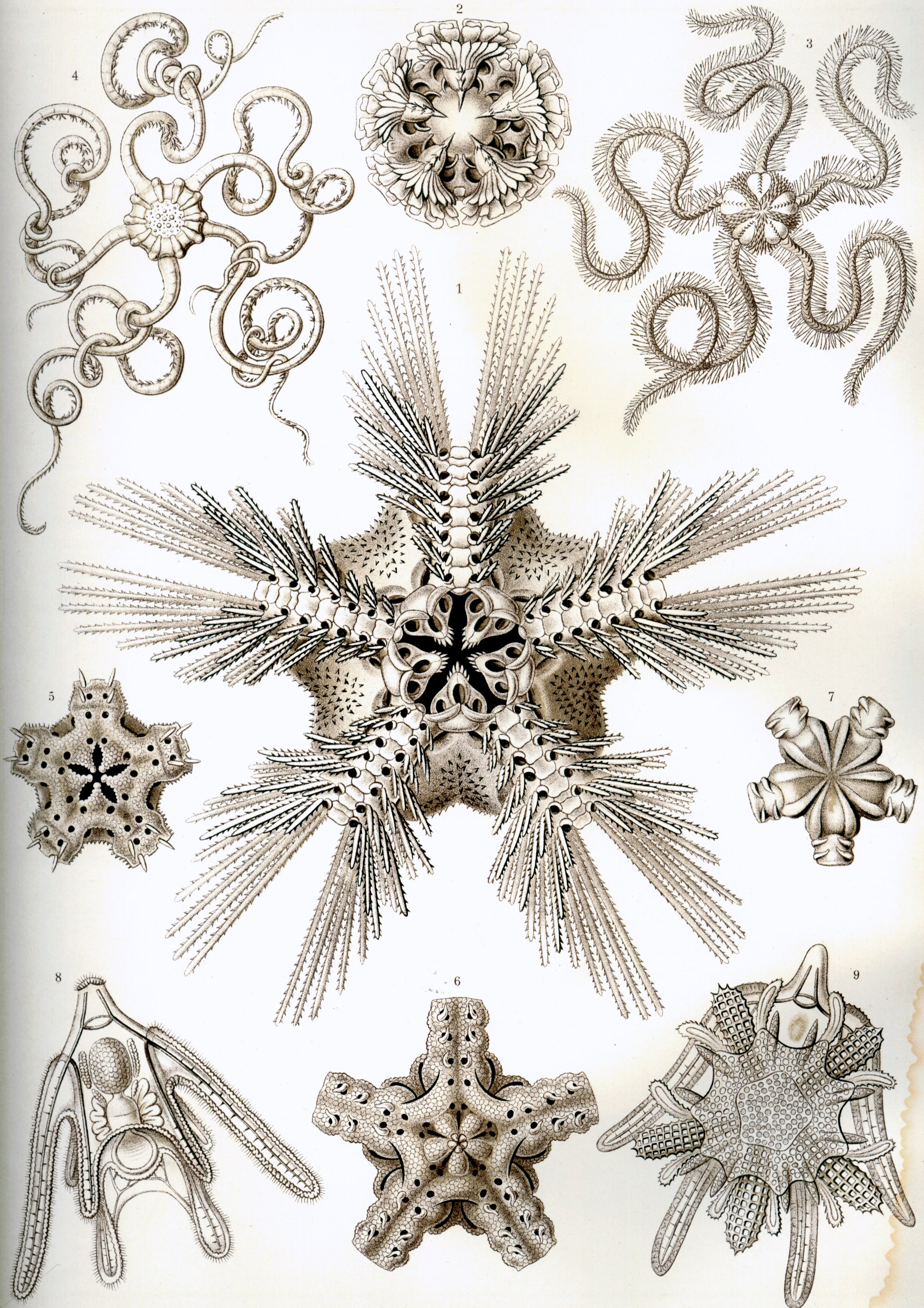
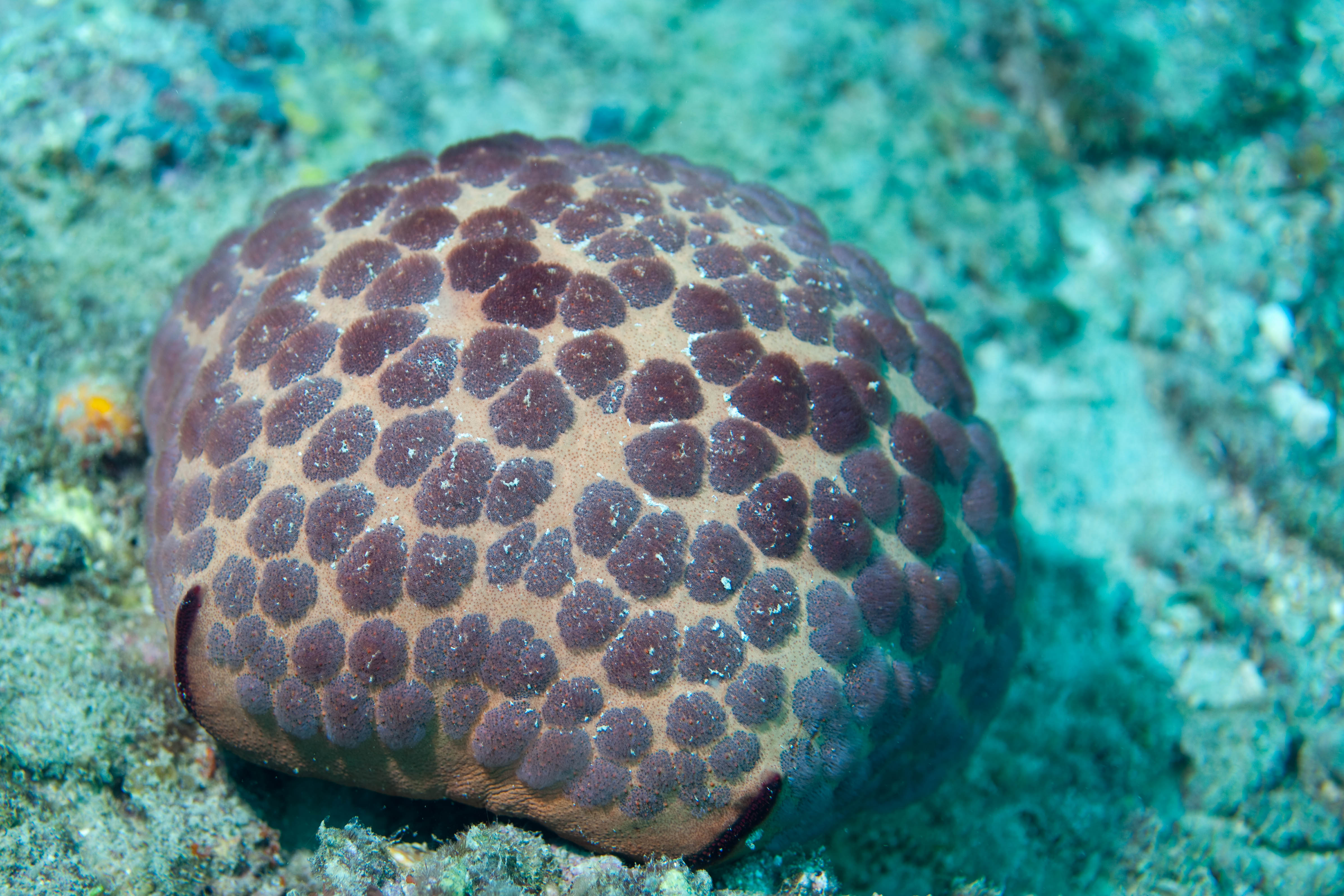
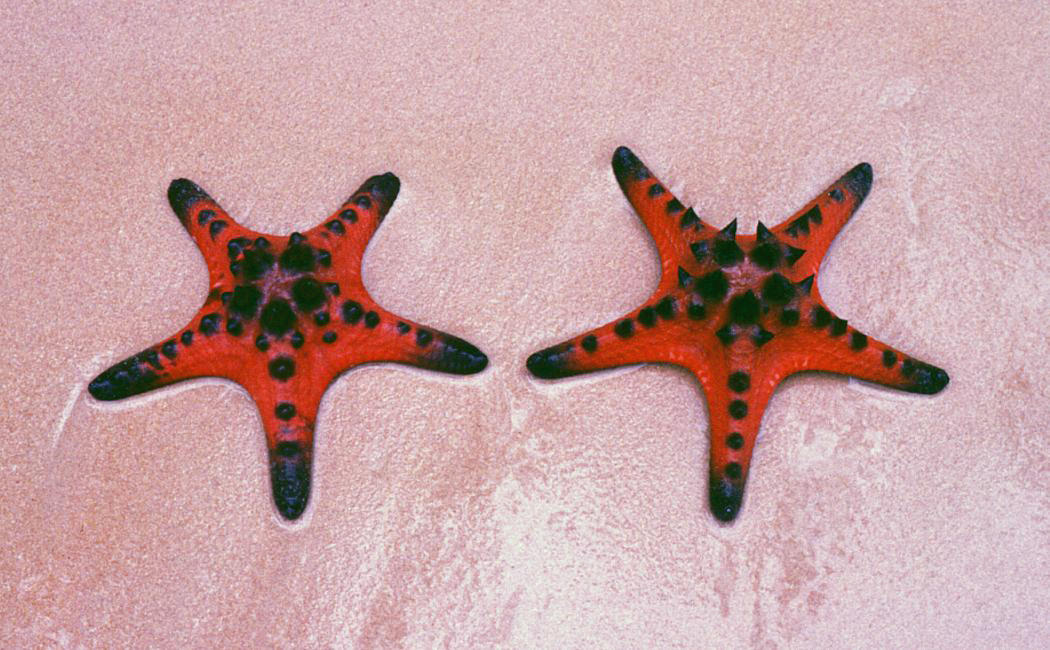
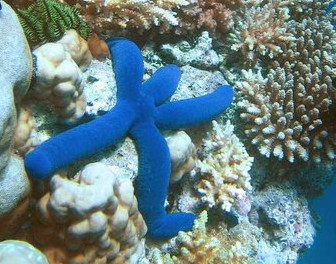
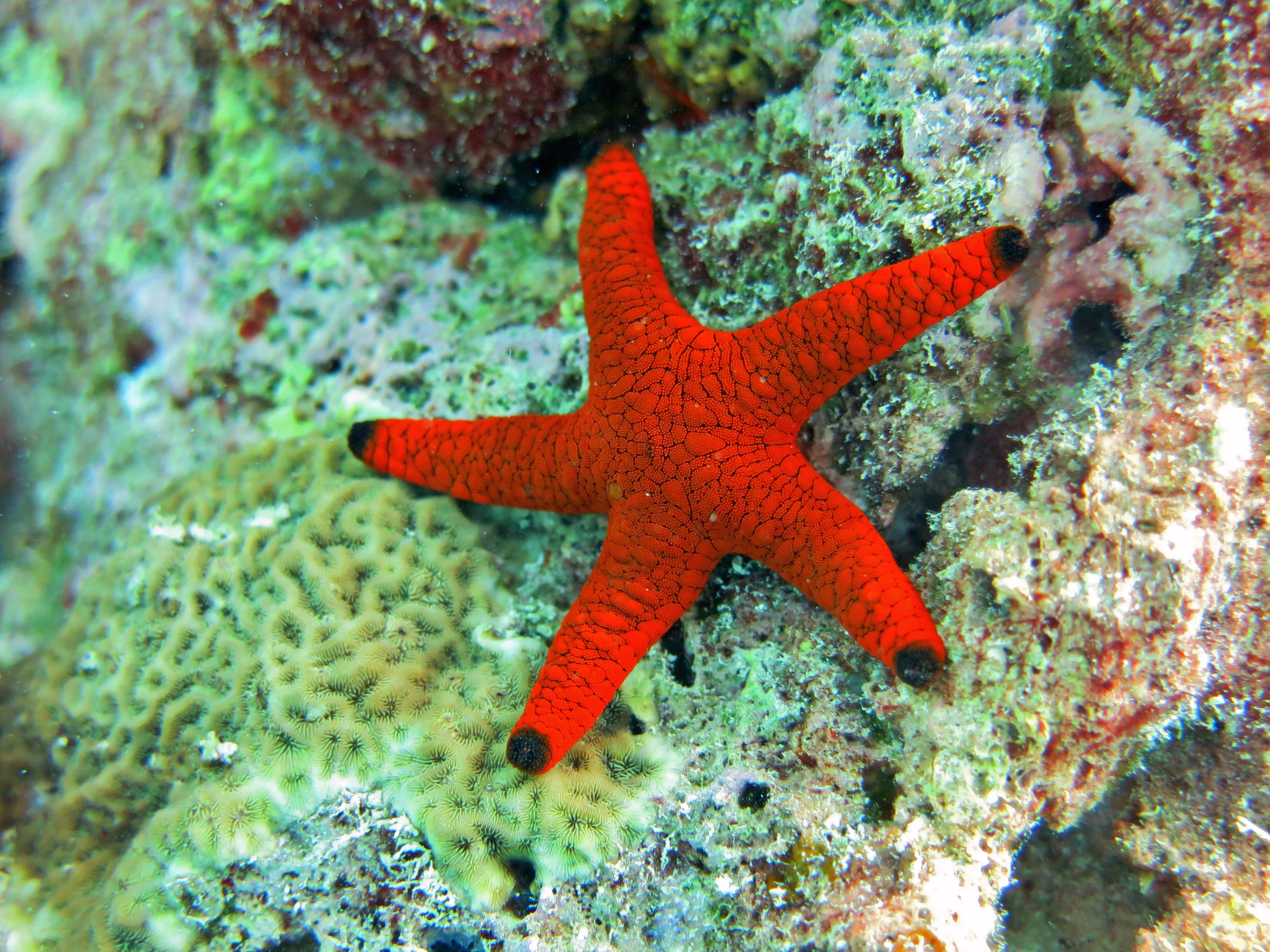
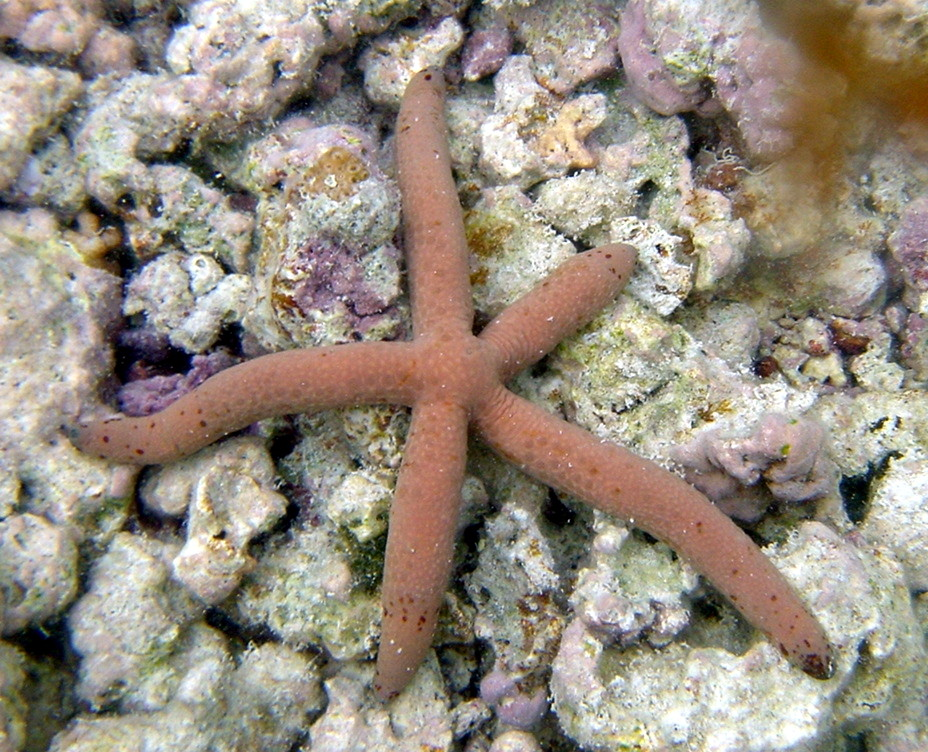
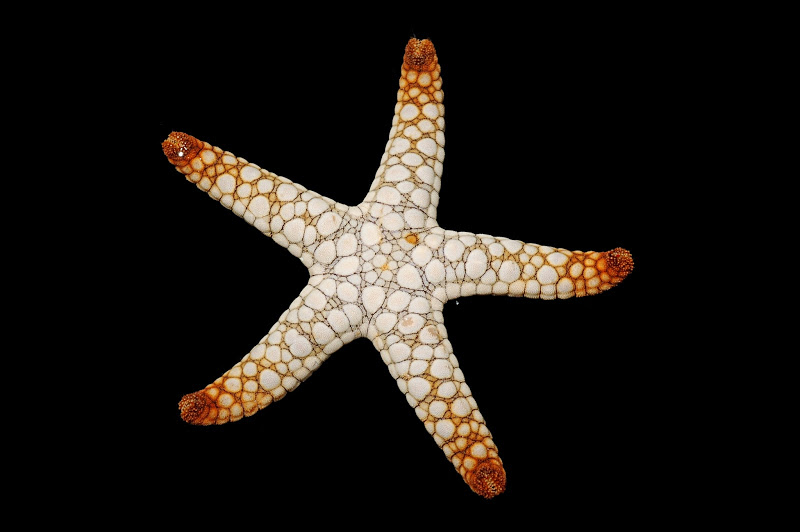
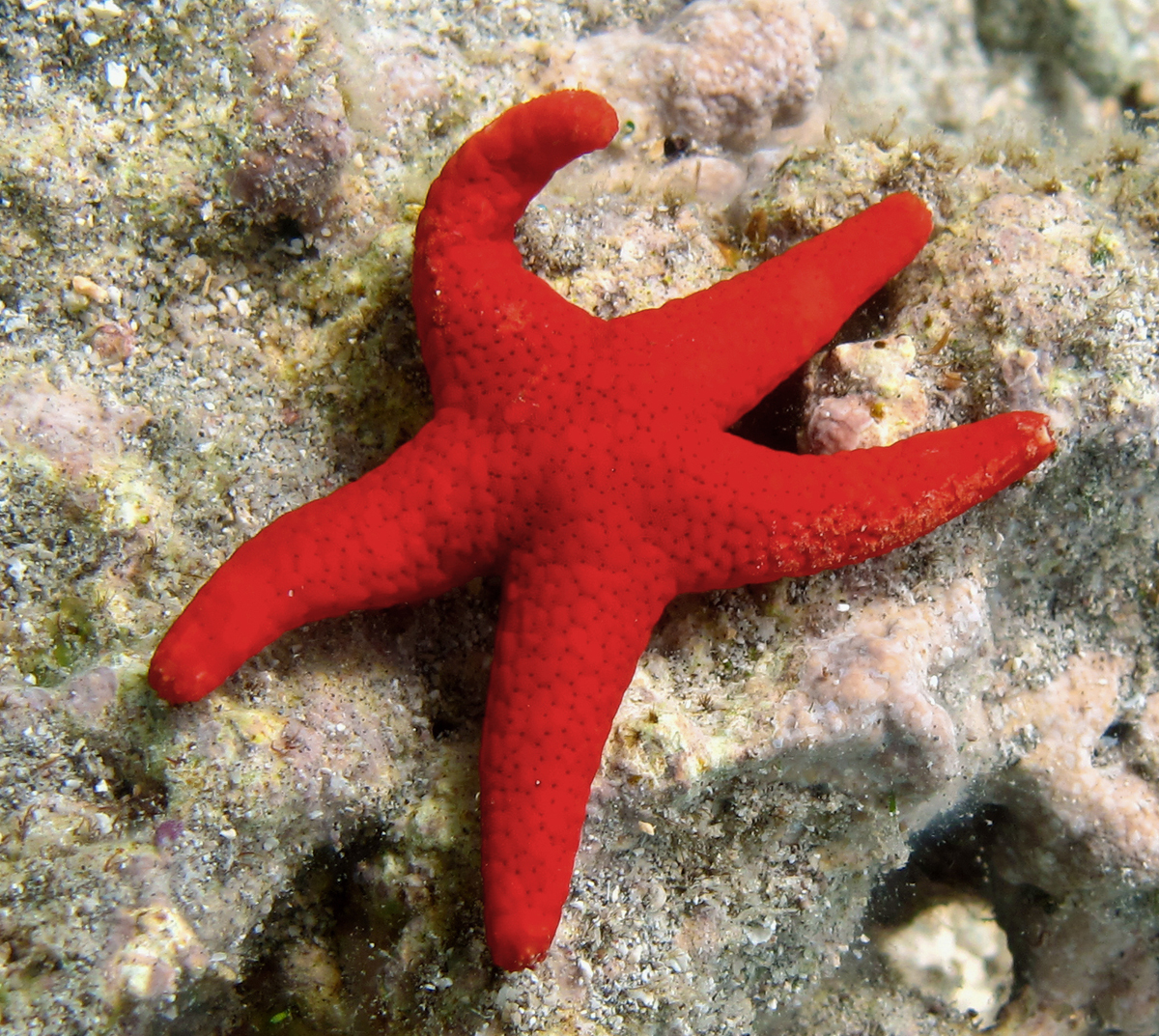
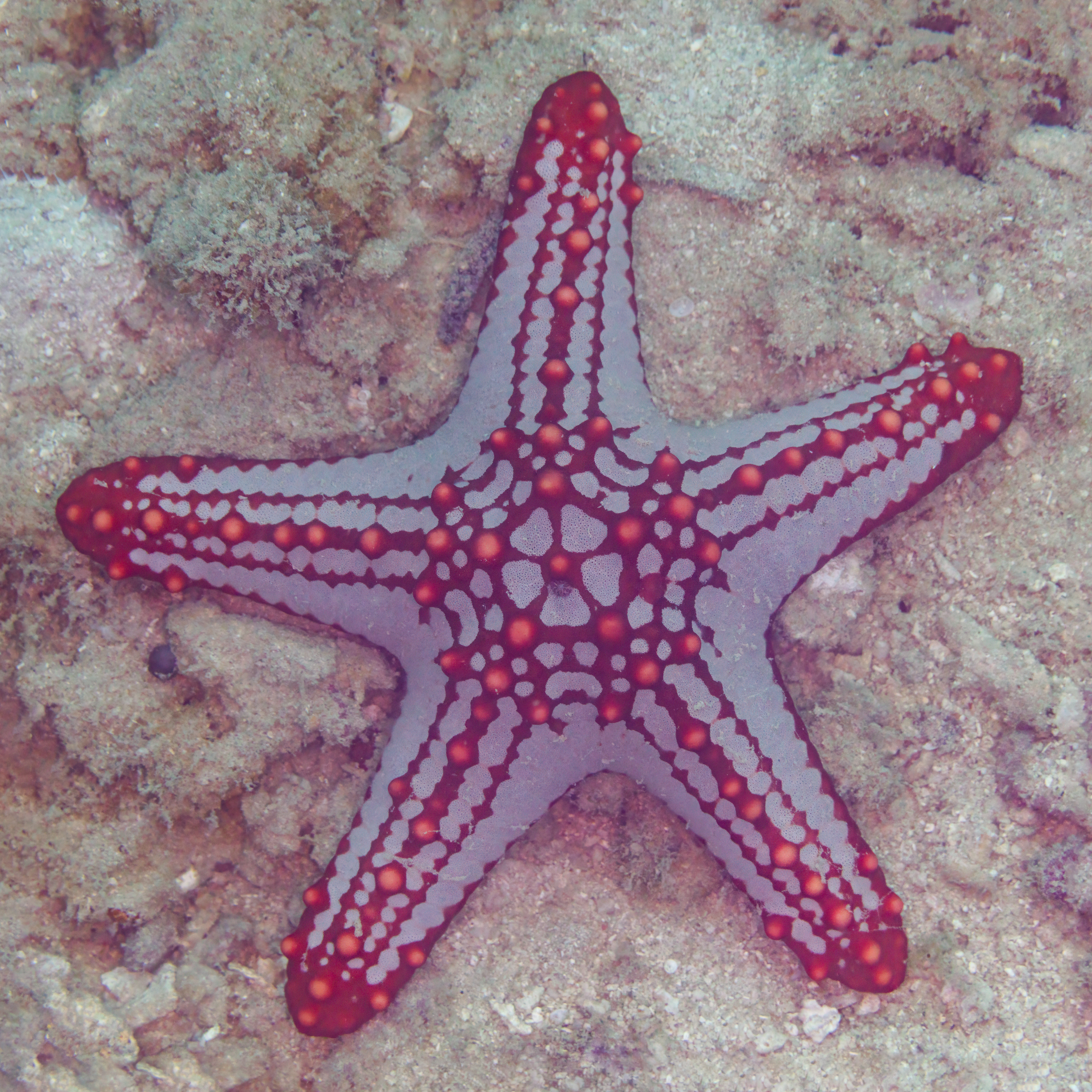
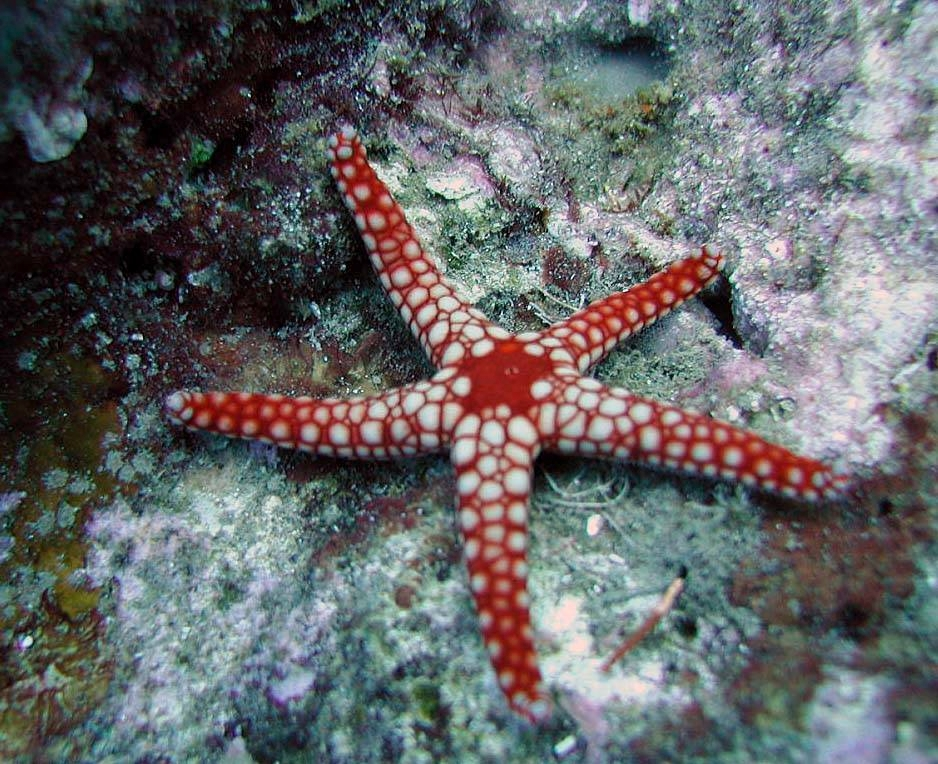
Common name(s)	Image	Taxonomy	Reef safe	Care Level	Description	Max size
Blue and pink sea star		Astropecten sp.
Brittle star		Ophiomastix	Yes	Easy		60 cm (23.6 in)
Bun star		Culcita novaeguineae	With care?			30 cm (11.8 in)
Chocolate chip sea star		Protoreaster nodosus	No	Moderate?		30 cm (11.8 in)
Blue linckia		Linckia laevigata				30 cm (11.8 in)
Indian Sea Star		Fromia indica	Yes	Moderate		7.5 cm (3.0 in)
Mottled linckia		Linckia multifora				13 cm (5.1 in)
Little red star		Fromia elegans
Purple linckia		Linckia teres, or Tamaria stria	Yes	Difficult		20 cm (7.9 in)
Red Sea Star		Fromia millepora	Yes	Moderate		15 cm (5.9 in)
Red-knobbed starfish		Protoreaster linckii	No			30 cm (11.8 in)
Sand sifting sea star		Astropecten polyacanthus	Yes	Easy	Needs a large sandbed	20 cm (7.9 in)
Tiled sea star, marbled sea star		Fromia monilis	Yes	Moderate		15 cm (5.9 in)

=== Crinoids ===
Common name	Image	Taxonomy	Reef safe	Care Level	Description	Max size
Feather star		Himerometra robustipinna	Yes	Expert	One of the most difficult species to keep alive in a home aquarium	37.5 cm (14.8 in)

=== Urchins ===
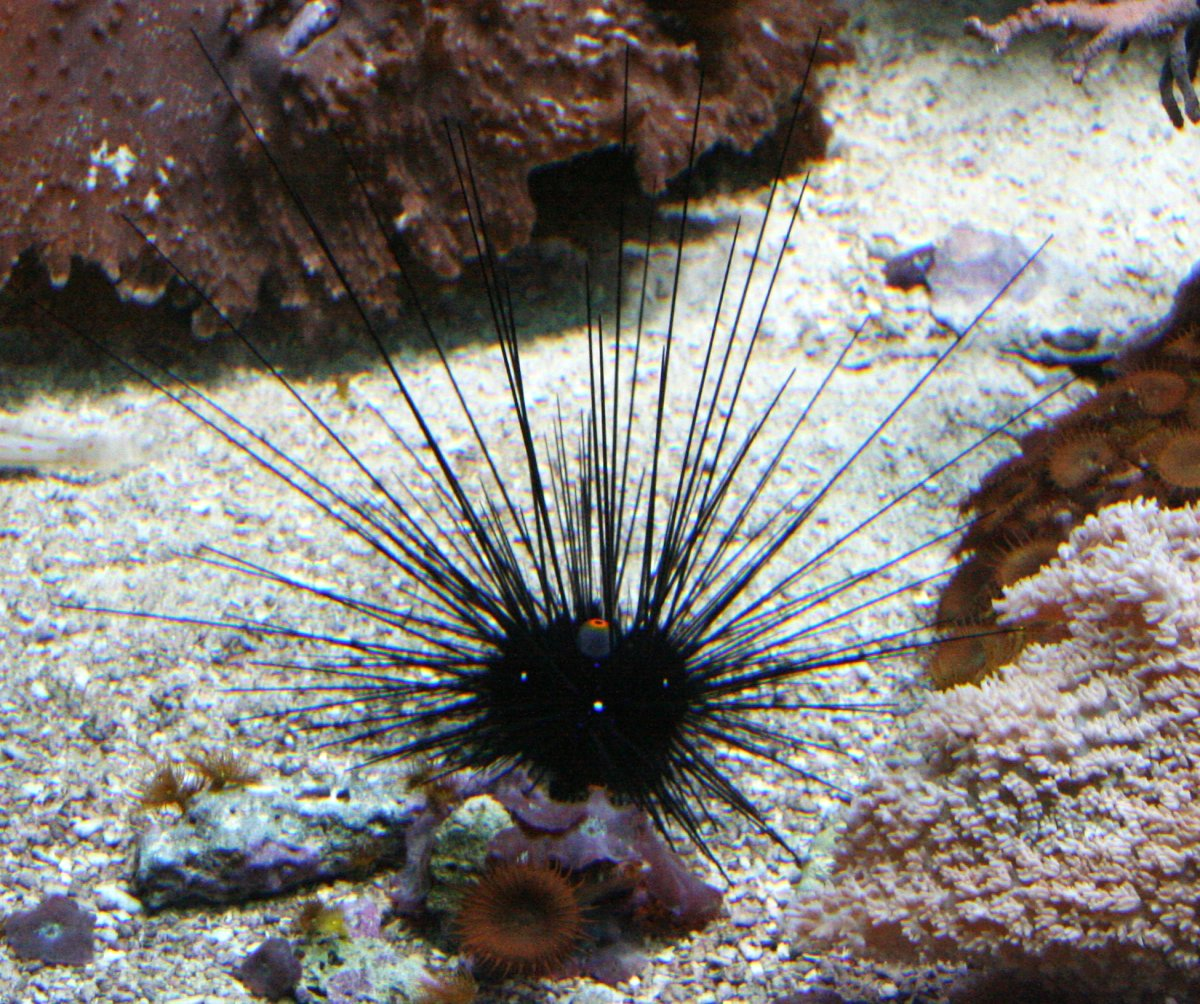
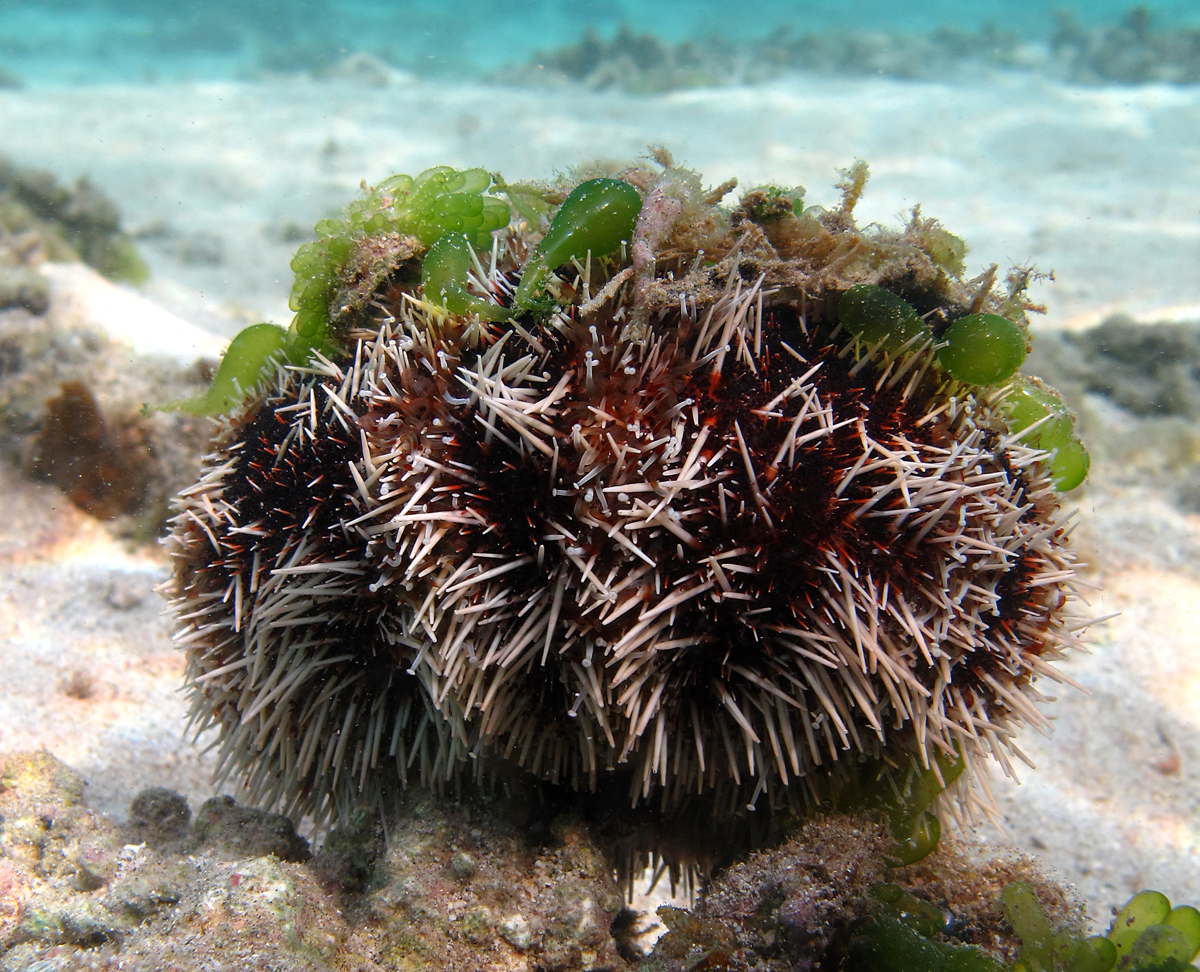
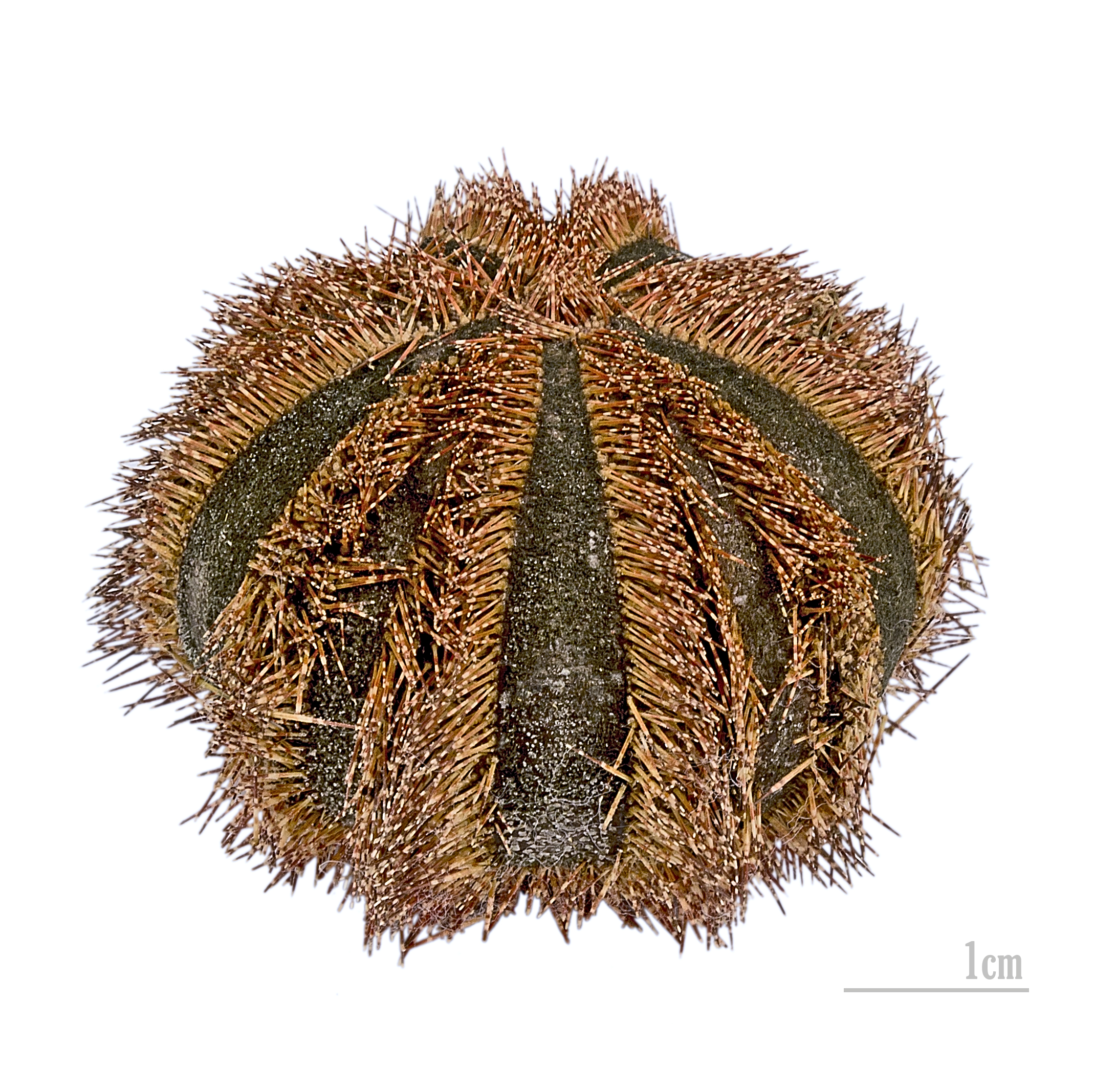
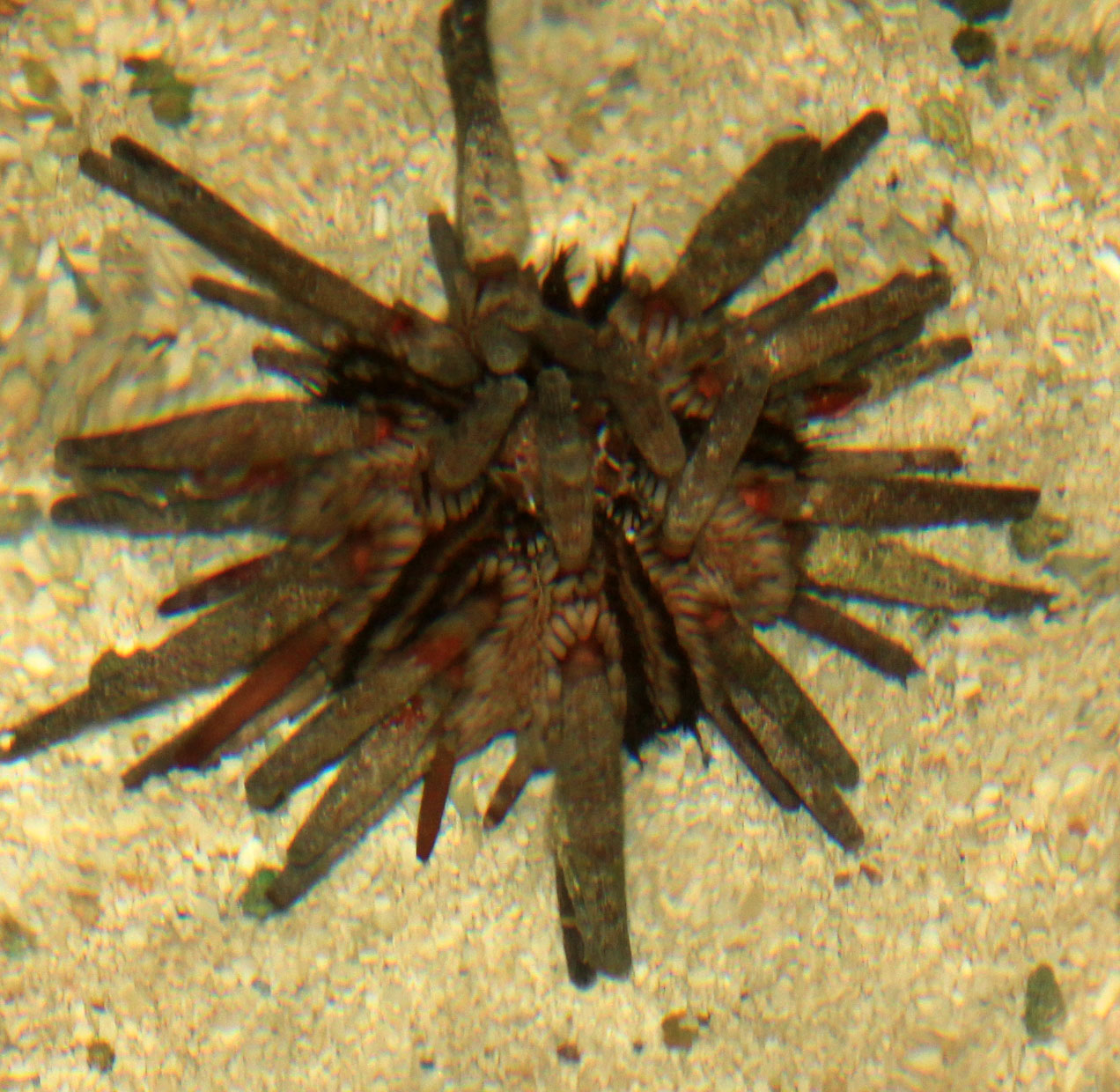
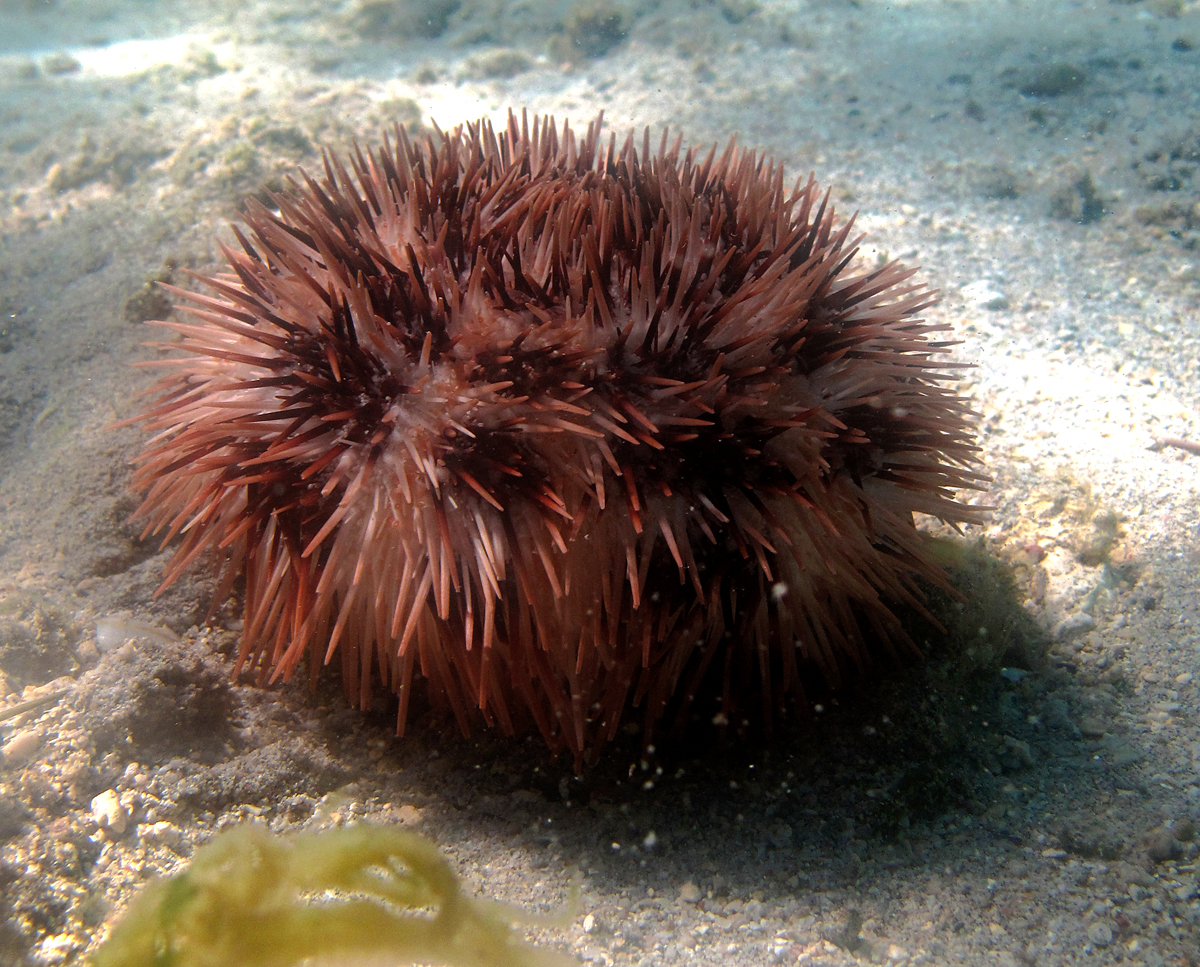
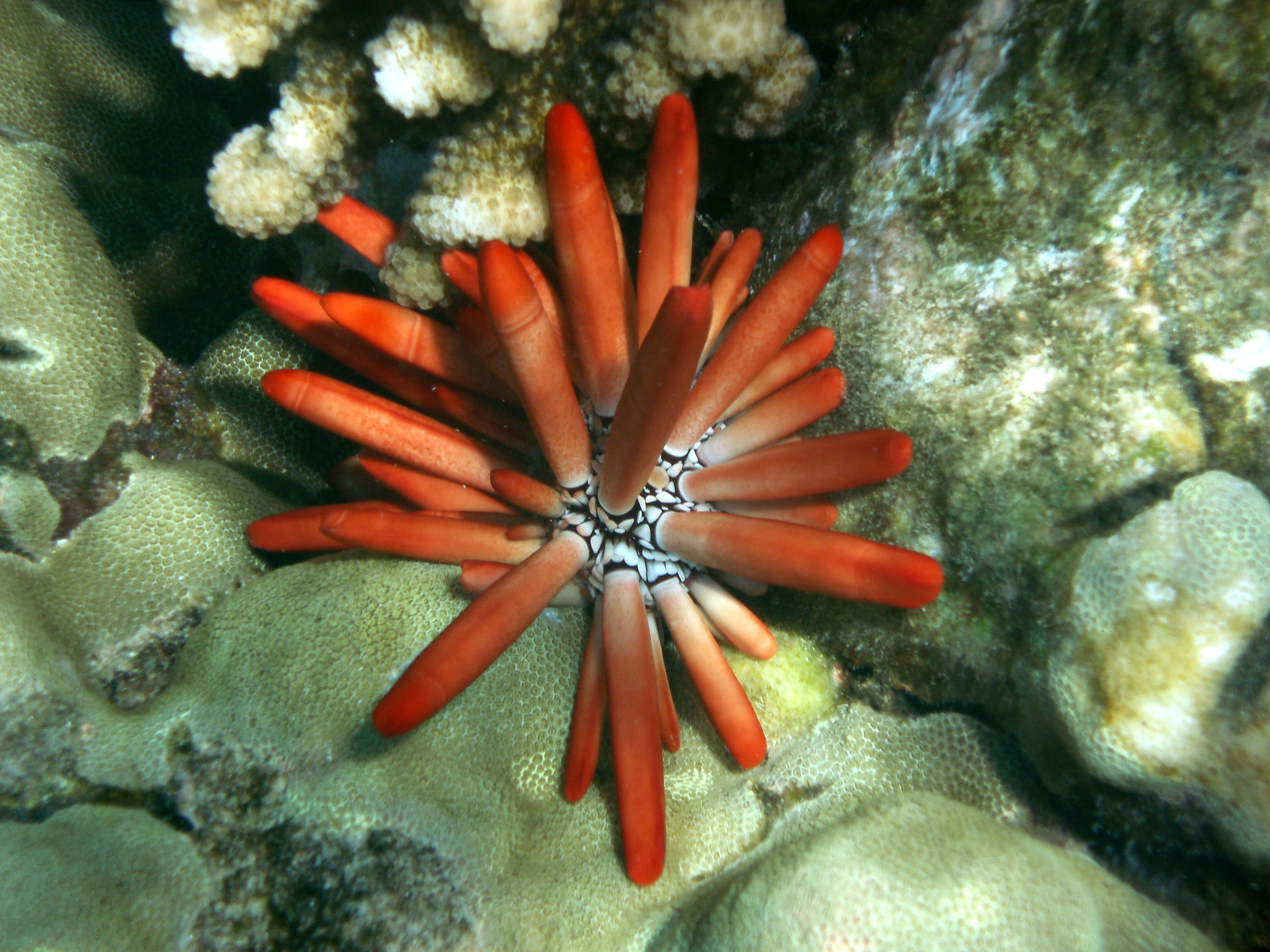
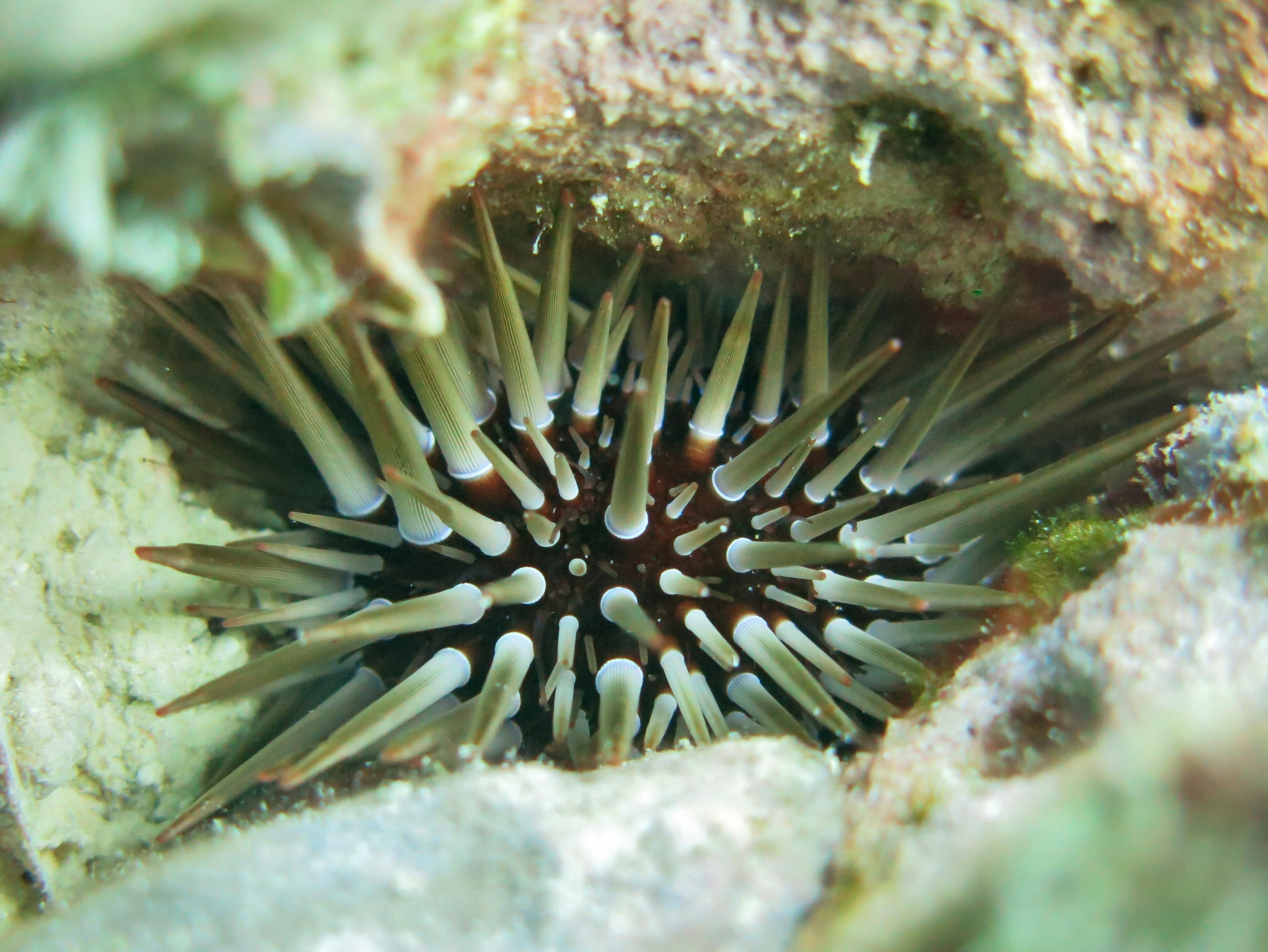
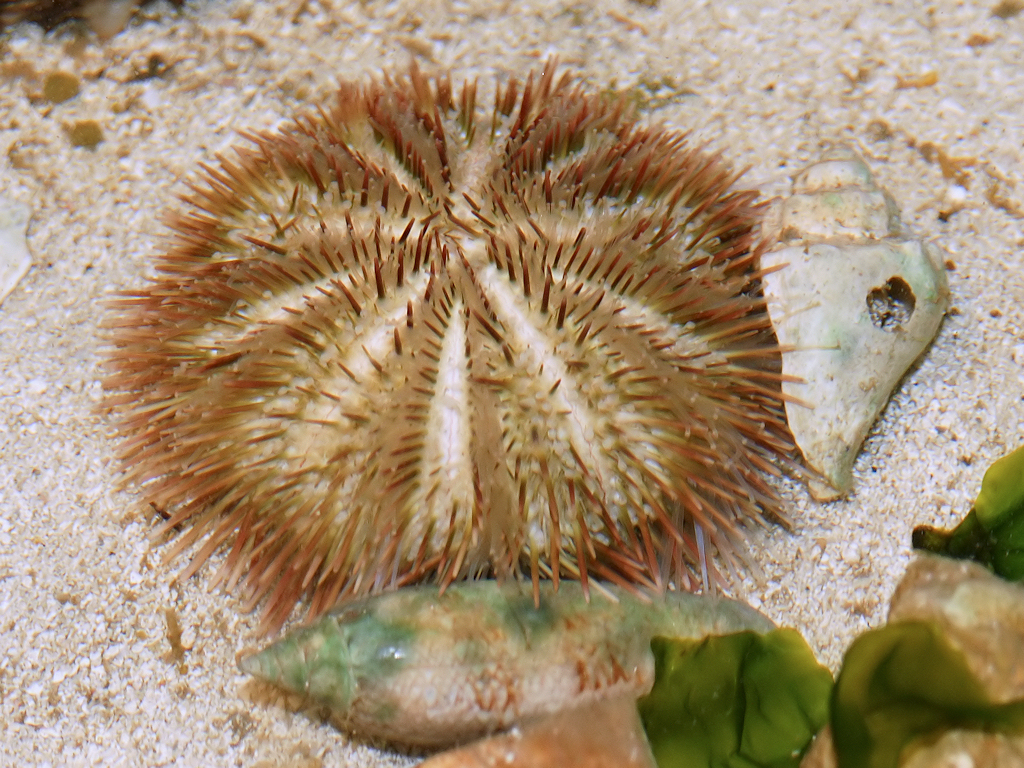
Common name(s)	Image	Taxonomy	Reef safe	Care Level	Description	Max size
Black longspine urchin		Diadema setosum
Collector urchin, Priest hat urchin, Sea Egg		Tripneustes gratilla
Globe urchin, Tuxedo urchin		Mespilia globulus	Yes	Easy	Very common in the aquarium trade	7.5 cm (3.0 in)
Slate pencil urchin		Eucidaris tribuloides
Purple short spine pincushion urchin		Pseudoboletia maculata
Red slate pencil urchin		Heterocentrotus mamillatus
Reef urchin, Rock boring urchin		Echinometra sp.
Variegated urchin		Lytechinus variegatus

== Jellyfish ==
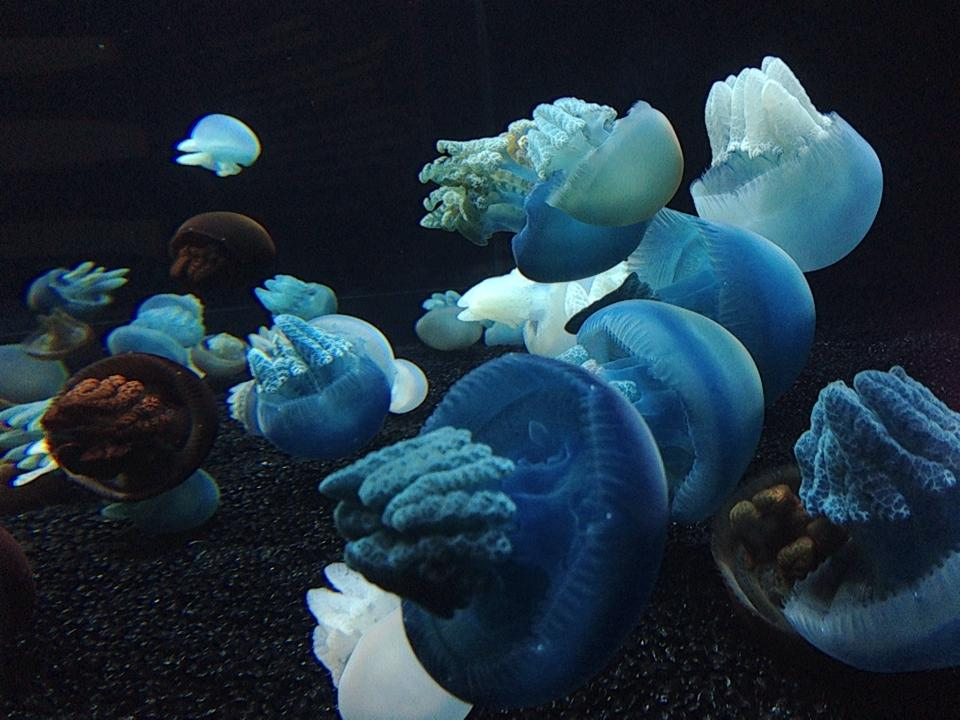
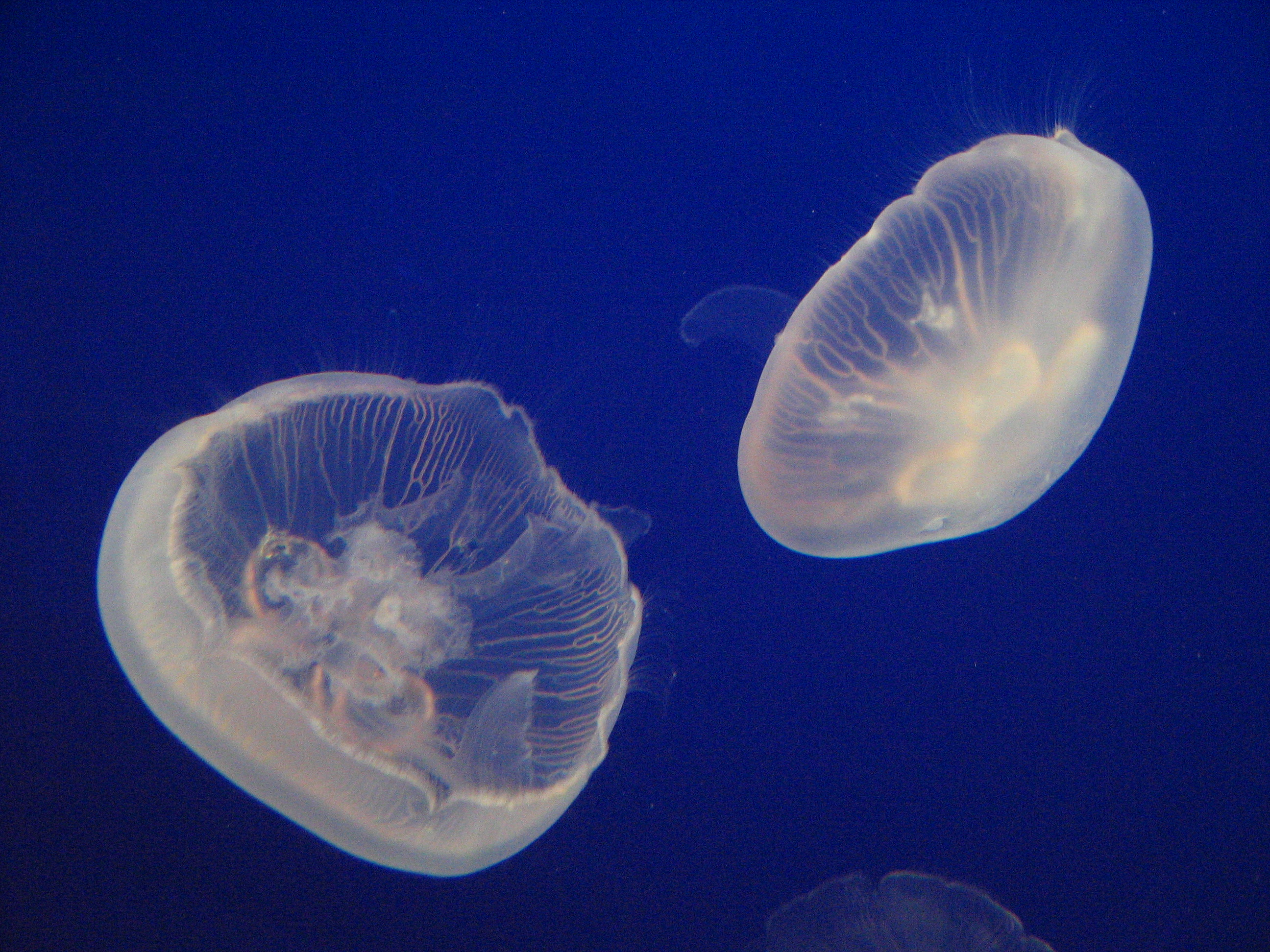
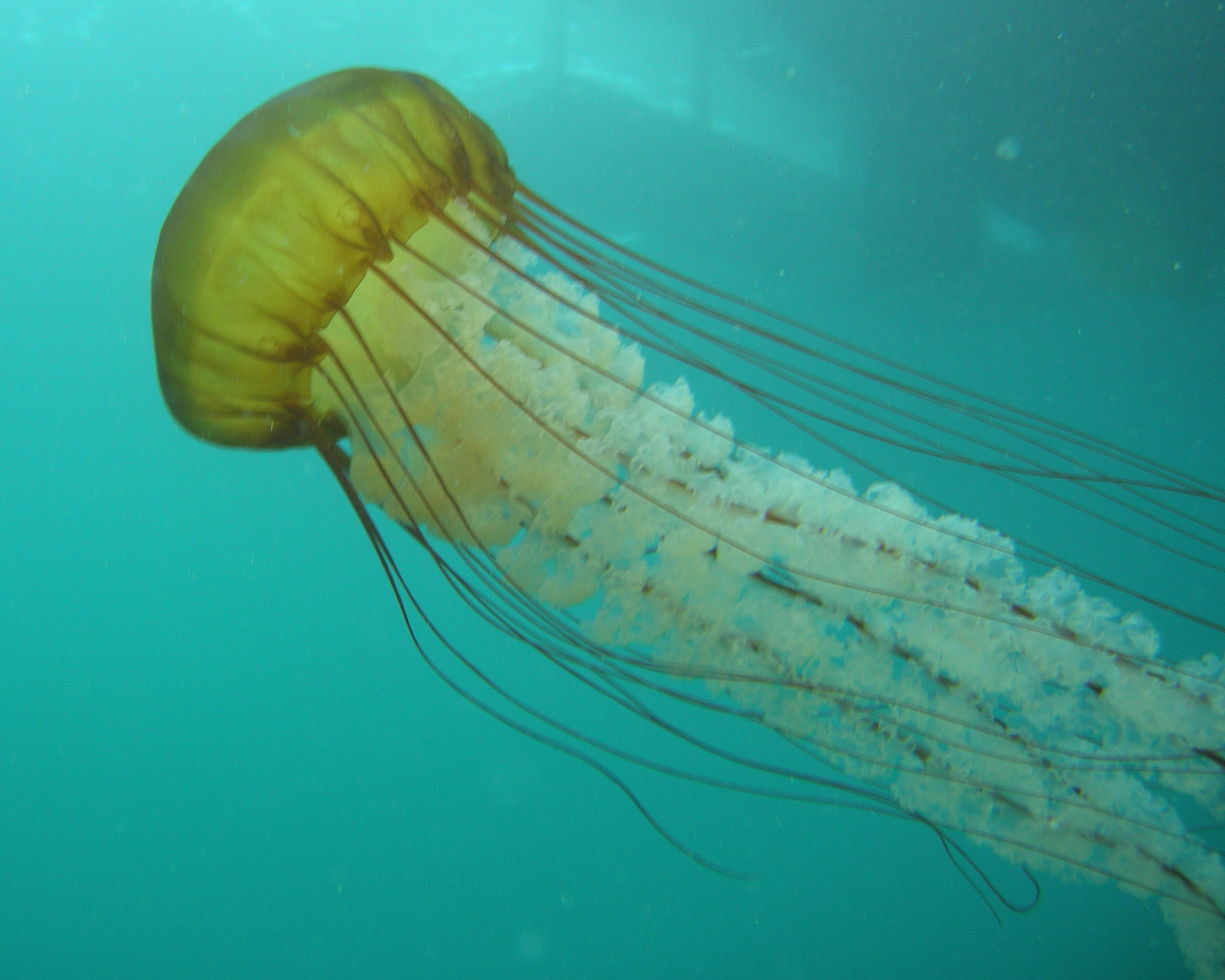
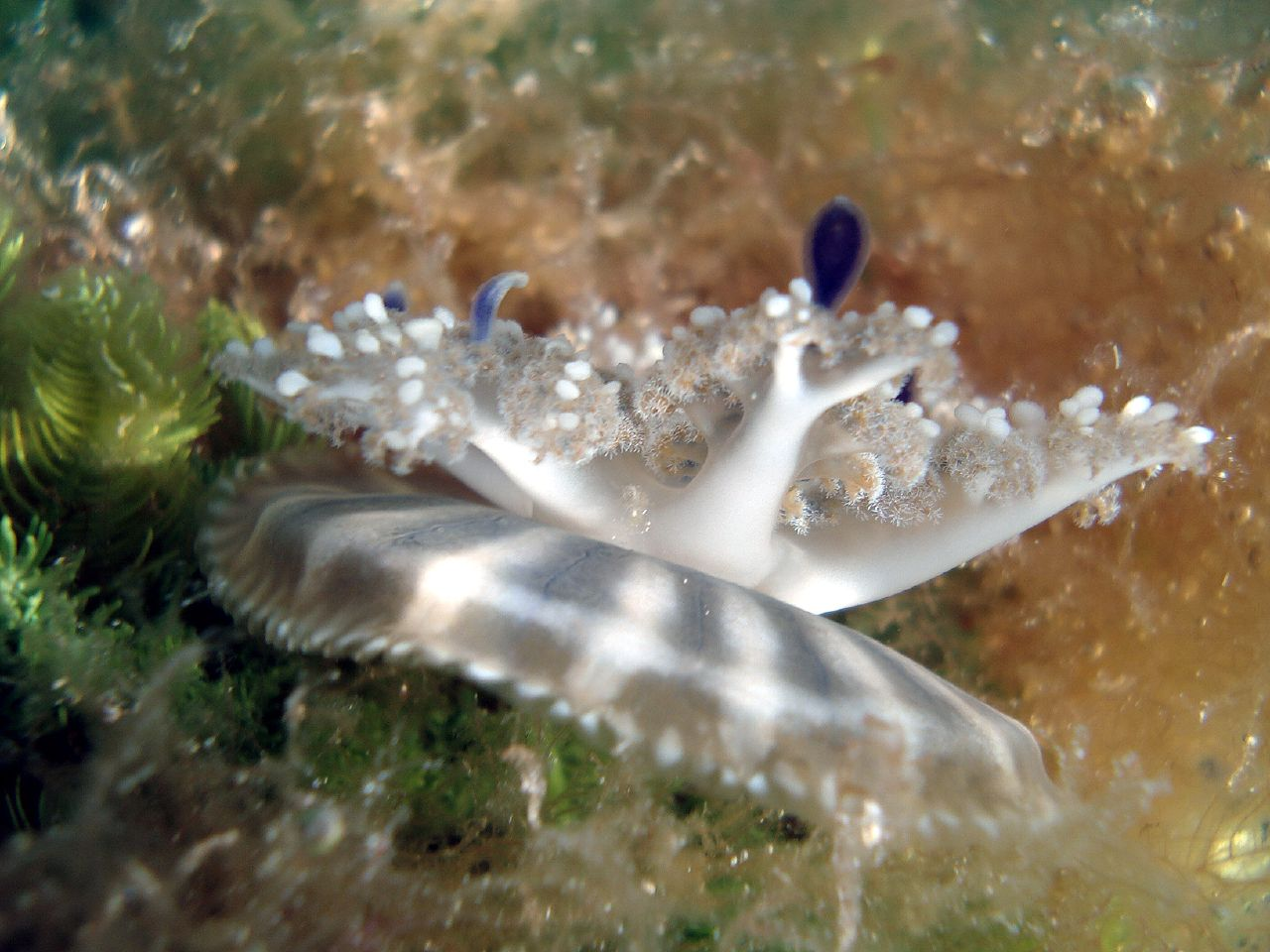
Common name	Image	Taxonomy	Reef safe	Care Level	Description	Max size (bell diameter)
Blue Blubber Jellyfish		Catostylus mosaicus	No	Expert	This jellyfish actually ranges in color from white to dark purple to reddish brown. It has a dome-shaped bell which pulses at a quick, steady pace, making these jellyfish strong, active swimmers.	25 cm (9.8 in)
Moon jellyfish		Aurelia aurita	No	Moderate to Difficult	A whitish to clear jellyfish with a large dinner-plate shaped bell. They have a fringe of short tentacles around the edge of the bell, and four longer oral arms extending from around the mouth.	50 cm (19.7 in)
Sea Nettles	Sea nettle (Chrysaora fuscescens) 2	Chrysaora sp.	No	Expert	Range in color from white to striped orange and brown to purplish. Long tentacles trail behind the bell, sometimes for several meters.	30 cm (11.8 in)
Upside Down jellyfish		Cassiopea sp.	No	Expert	This jellyfish has a somewhat green or grayish blue coloration due to symbiotic algae living in its tissues. It resides on the bottom, exposing its tentacles (and the algae inside them) to the light. very similar to coral in behavior	30 cm (11.8 in)

== Mollusks ==
=== Bivalves ===
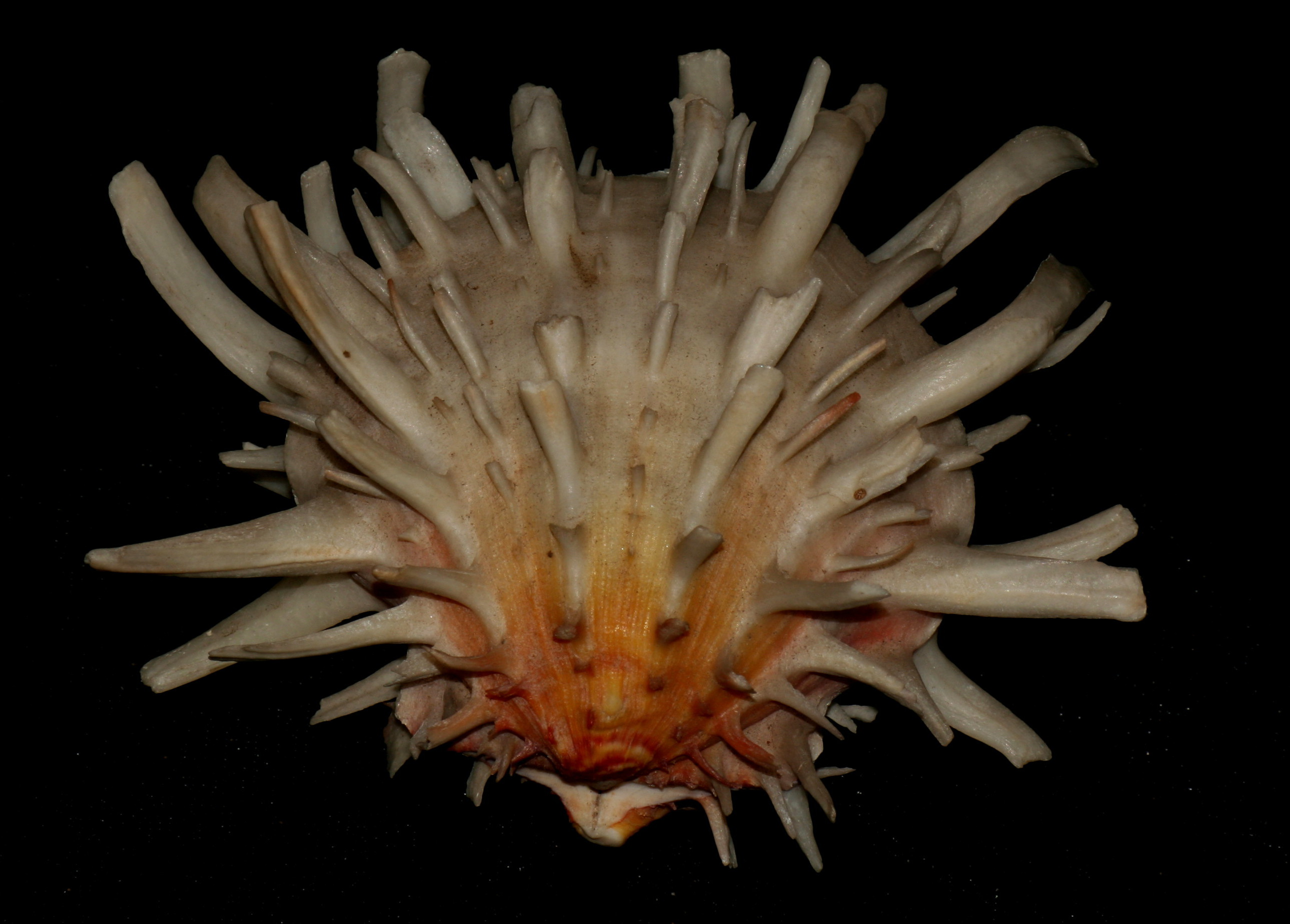
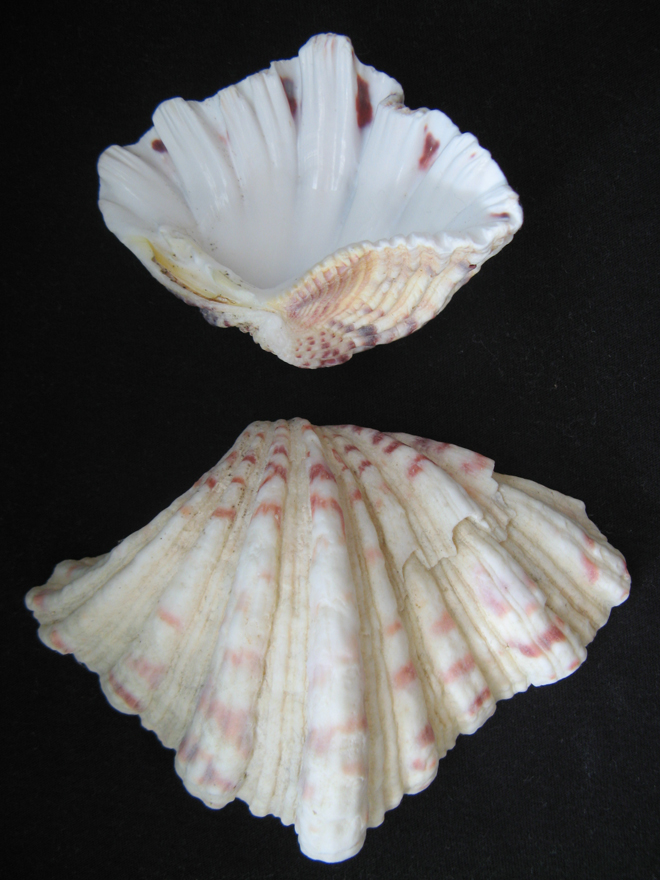
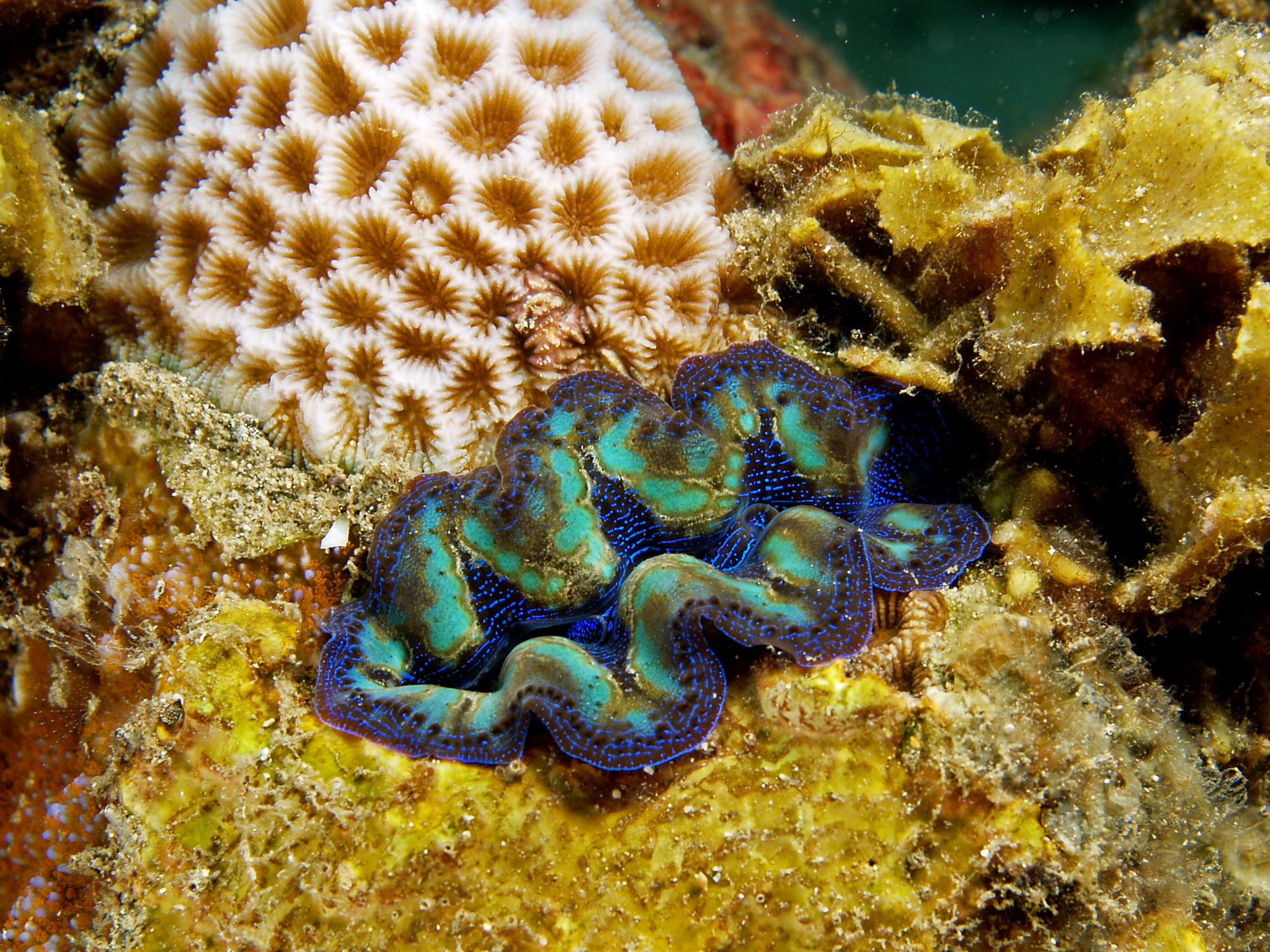
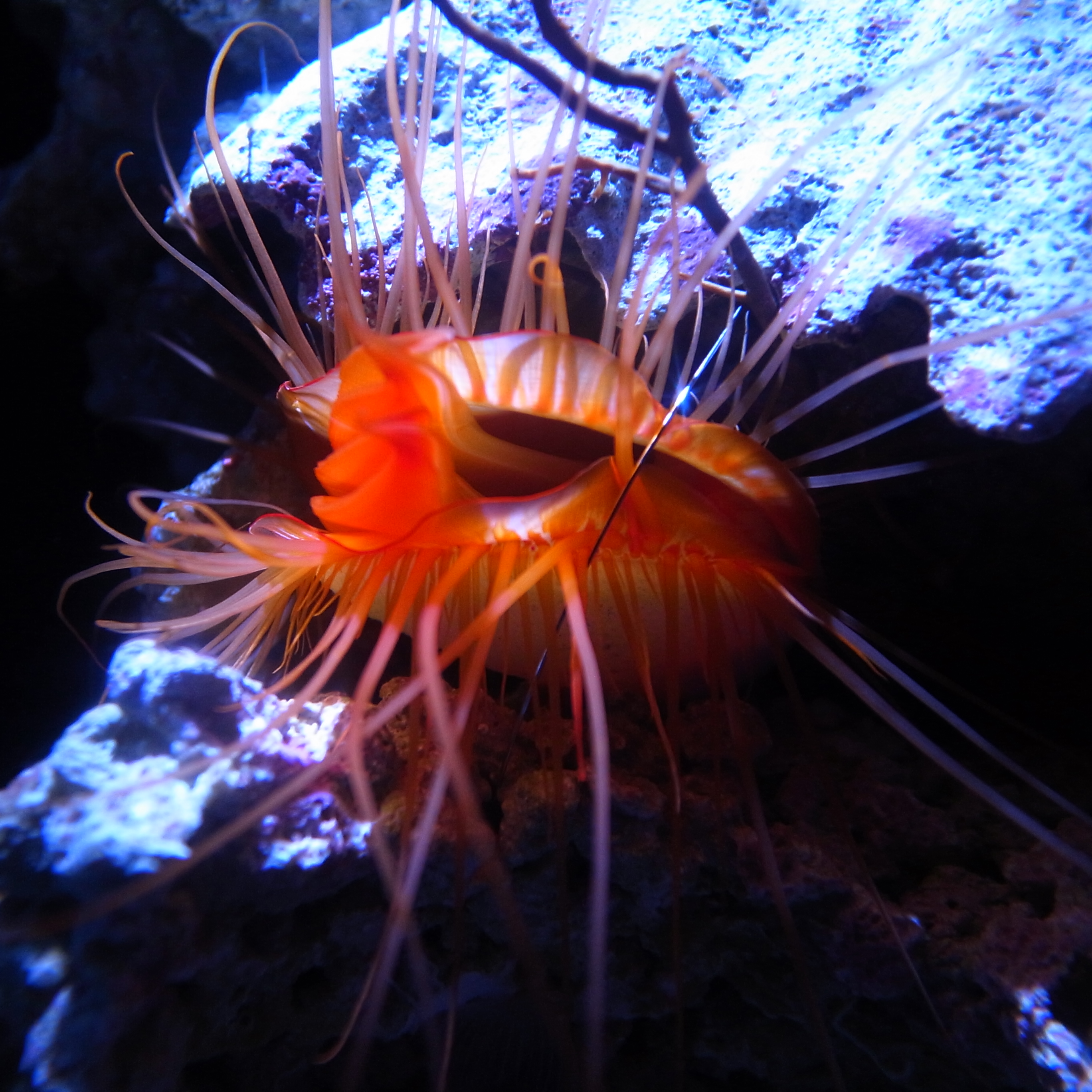
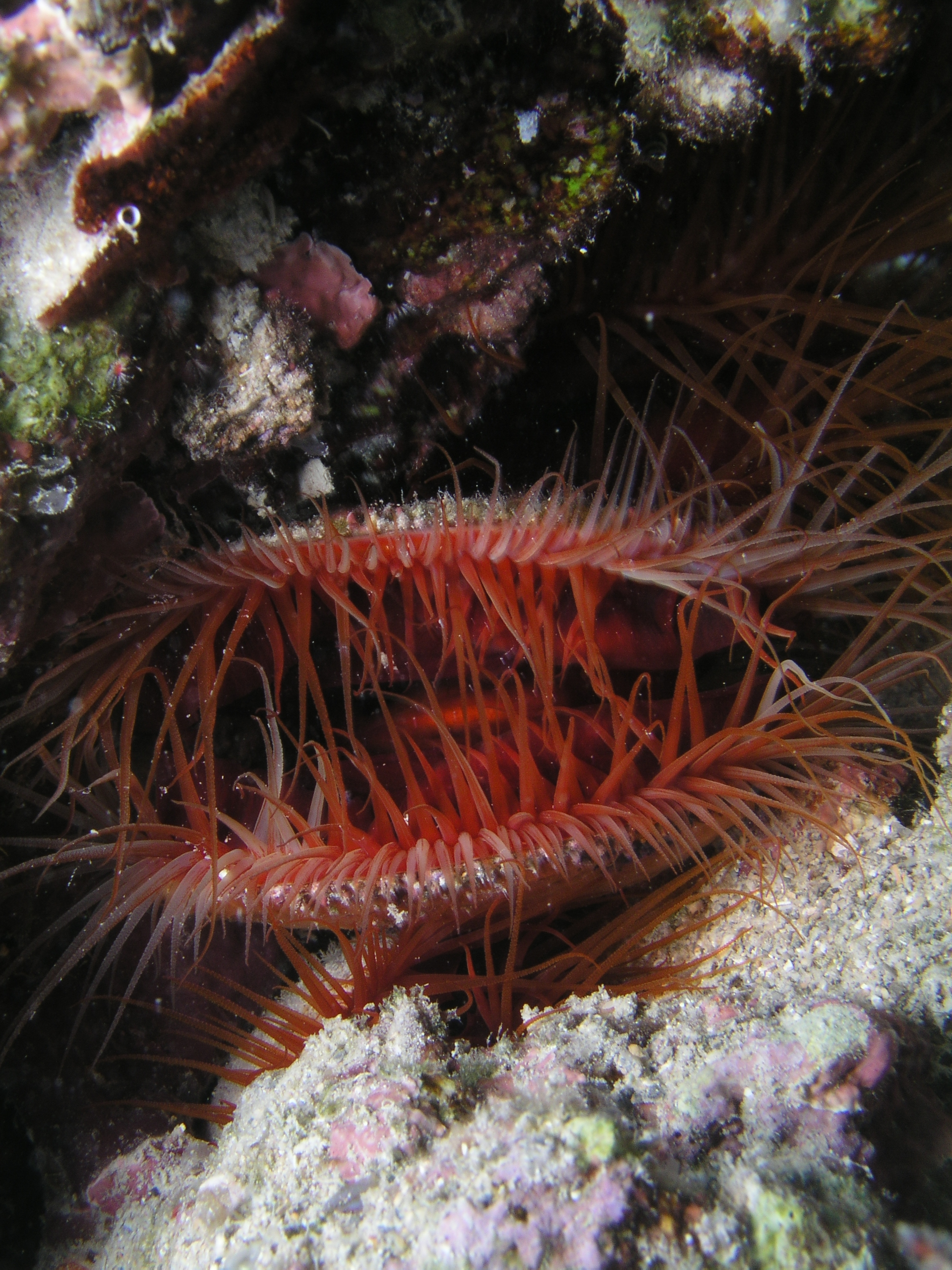
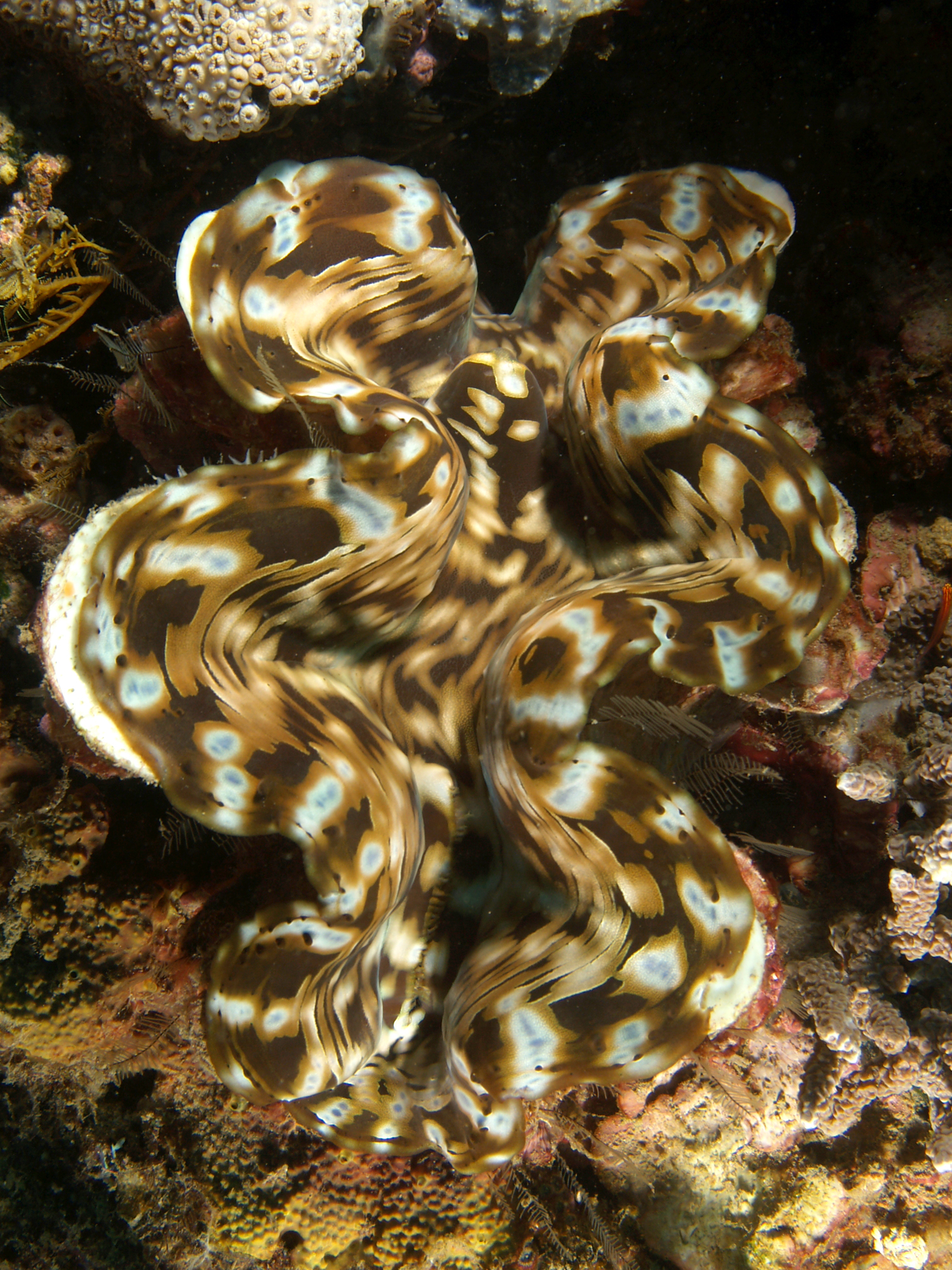
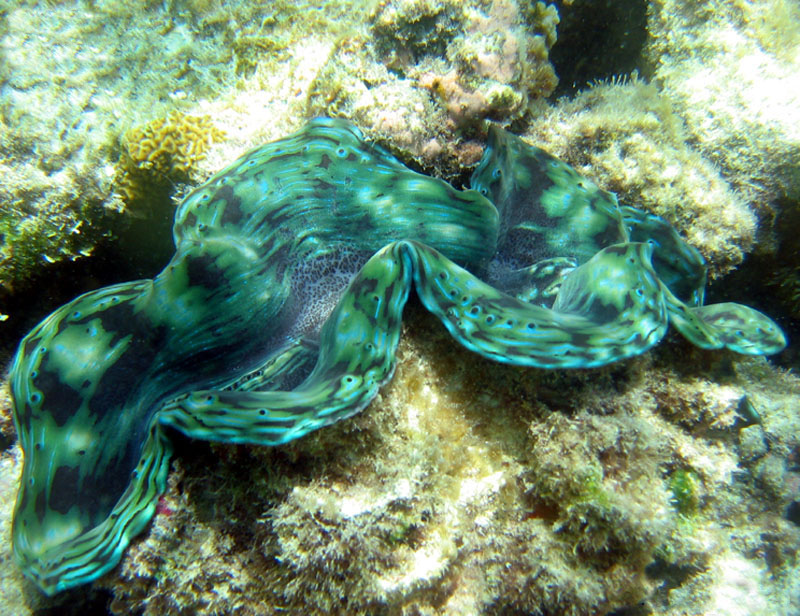
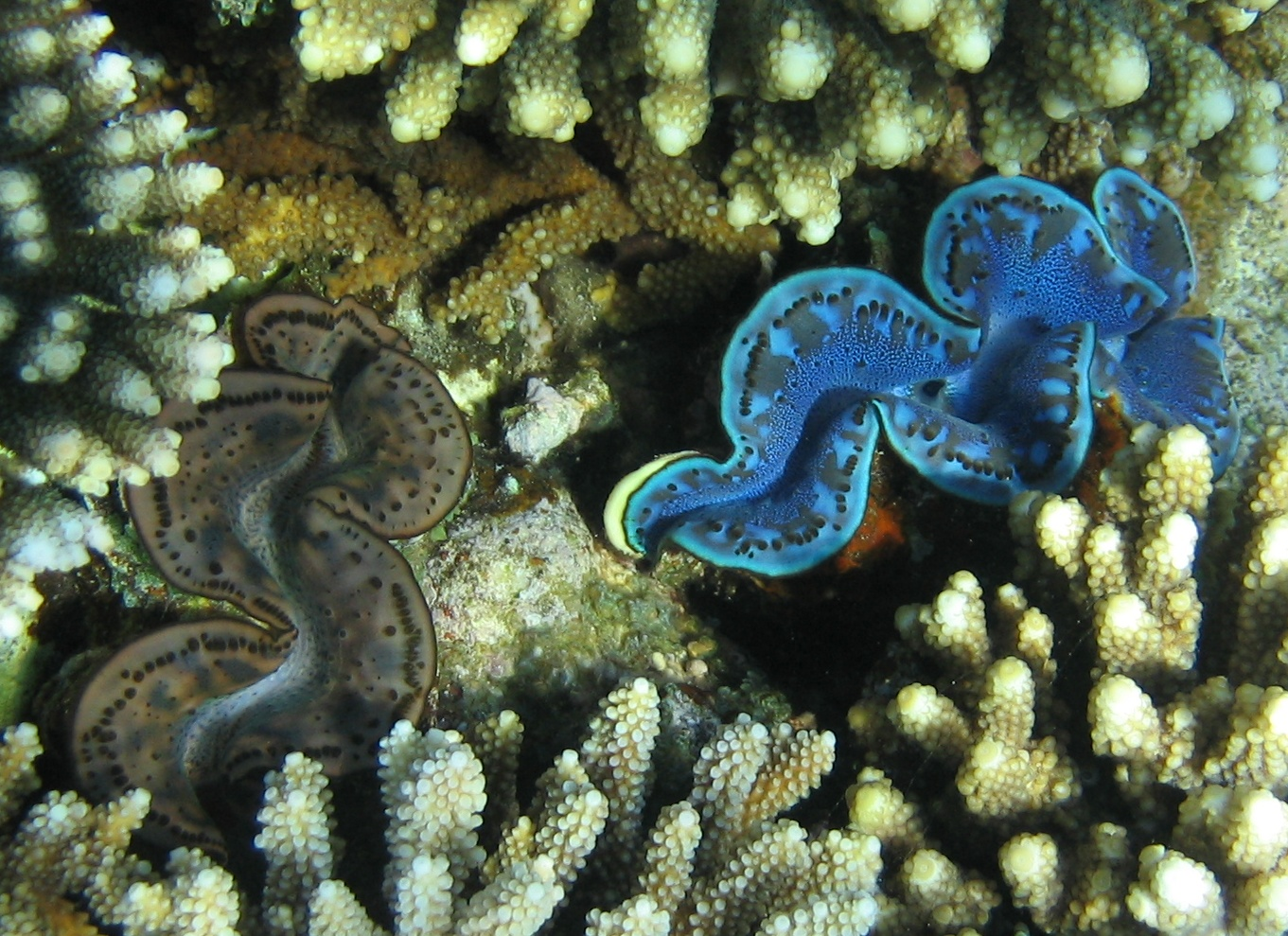
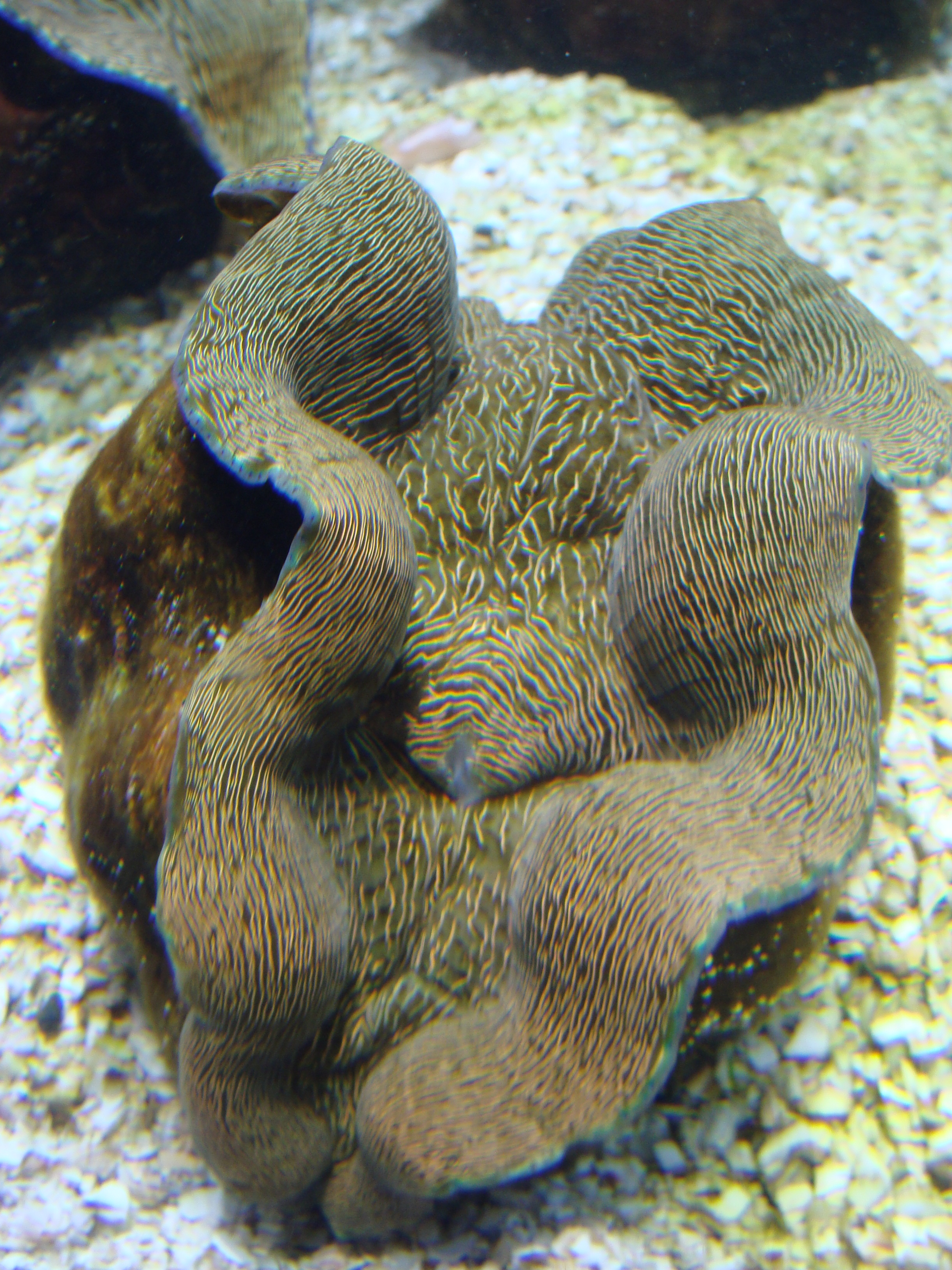
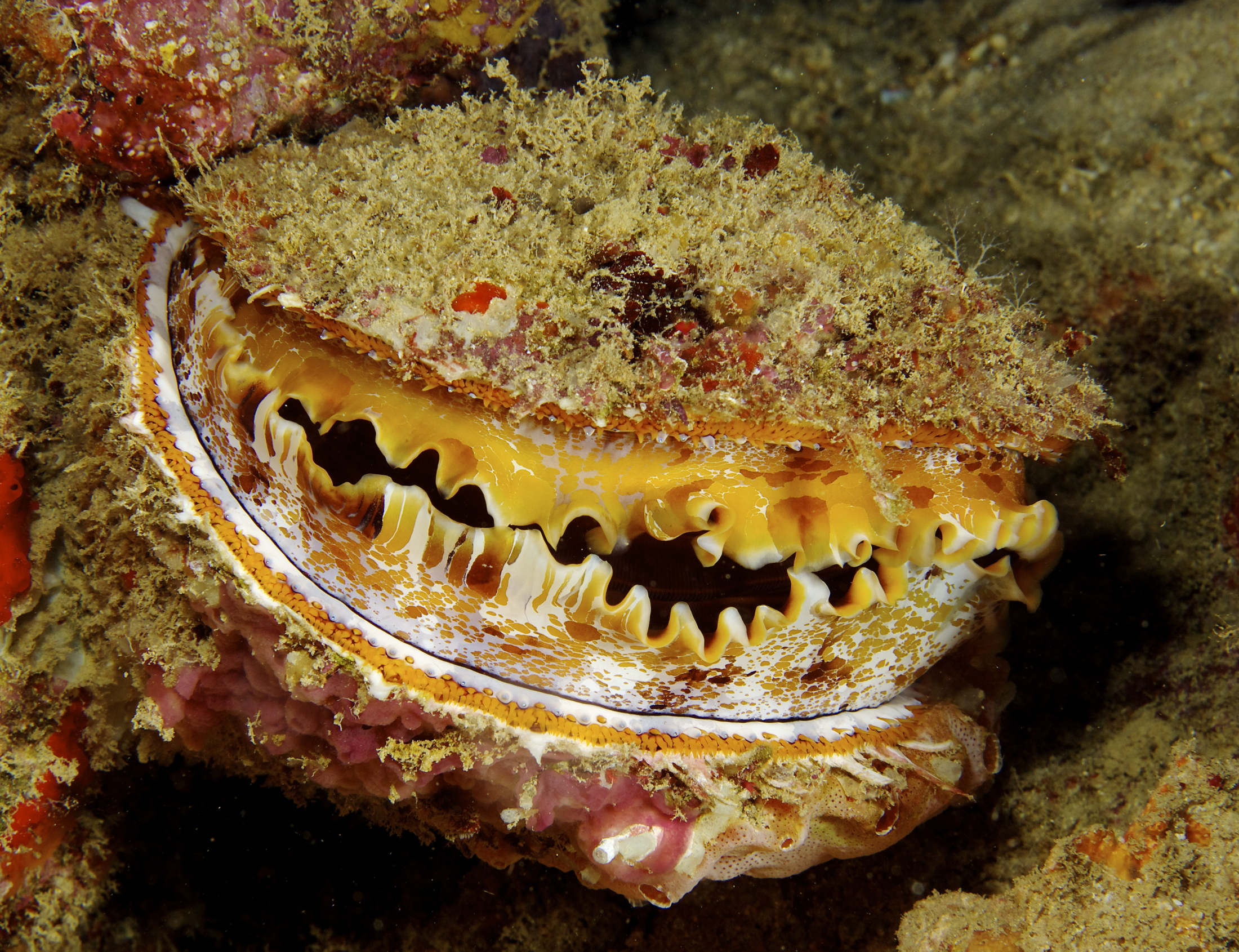
Common name	Image	Taxonomy	Reef safe	Care Level	Description	Max size
Atlantic Thorny oyster	Spondylus americanus	Spondylus americanus				10 cm (3.9 in)
Bear paw clam		Hippopus hippopus
Blue clam, Boring clam		Tridacna crocea	Yes			15 cm (5.9 in)
China clam		Hippopus porcellanus
Electric flame scallop		Ctenoides ales	Yes
Flame scallop		Ctenoides scaber	Yes			3 in (7.6 cm)
Fluted giant clam		Tridacna squamosa	Yes	Moderate?		40 cm (15.7 in)
Flying scallop		Promantellum vigens
Gigas aka "Giant" clam		Tridacna gigas	Yes			120 cm (47.2 in)
Maxima clam		Tridacna maxima	Yes	Moderate		20 cm (7.9 in)
Southern giant clam		Tridacna derasa	Yes			60 cm (23.6 in)
Thorny oyster		Spondylus sp.

=== Gastropods ===
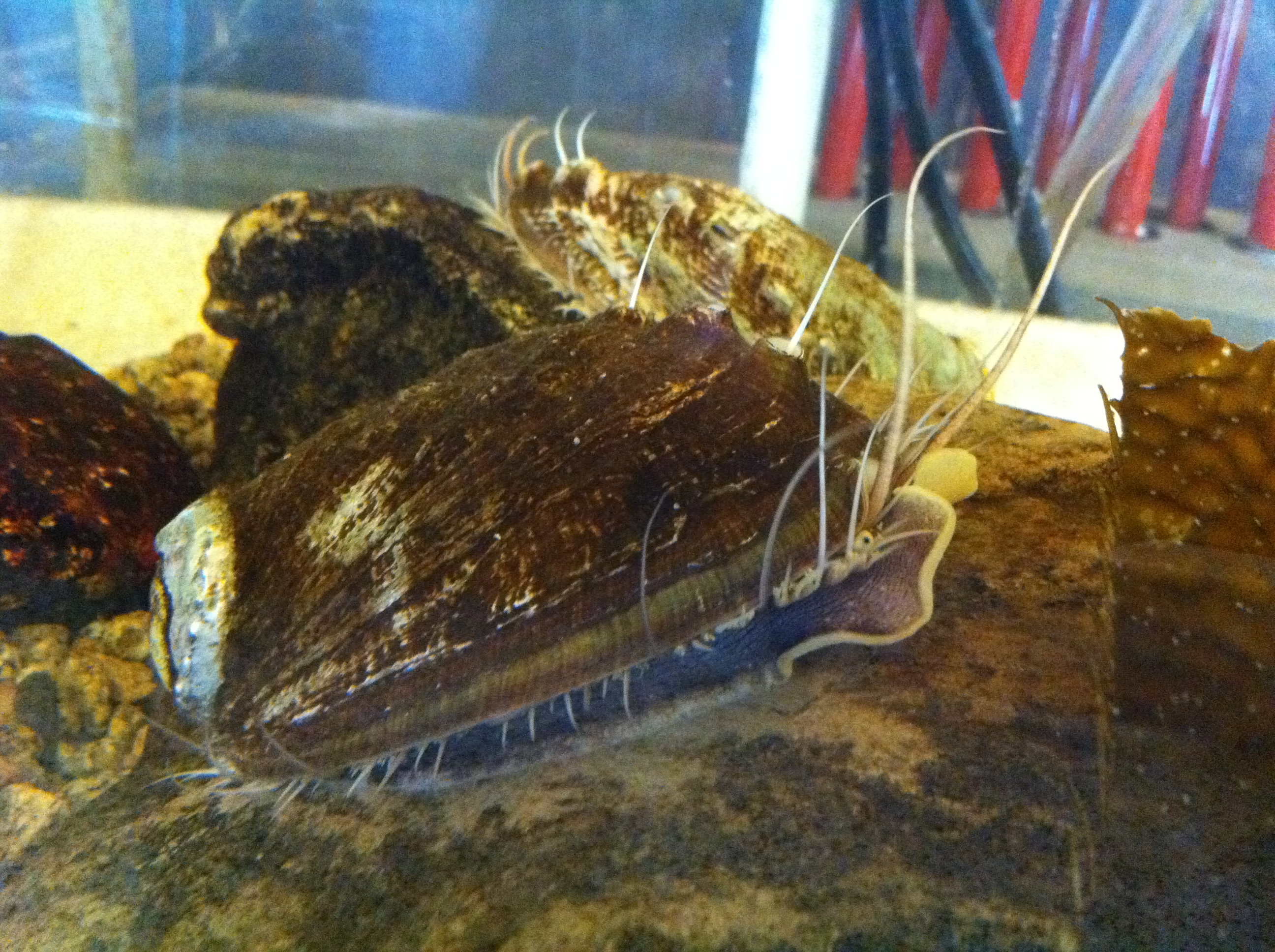
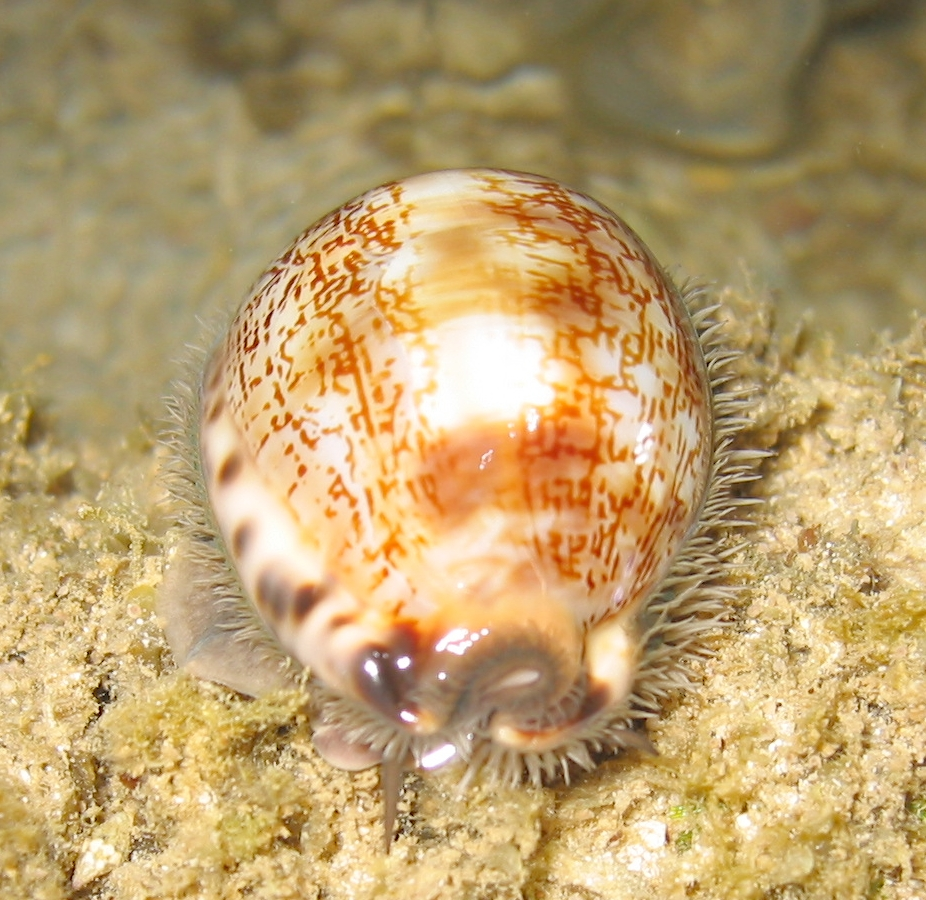
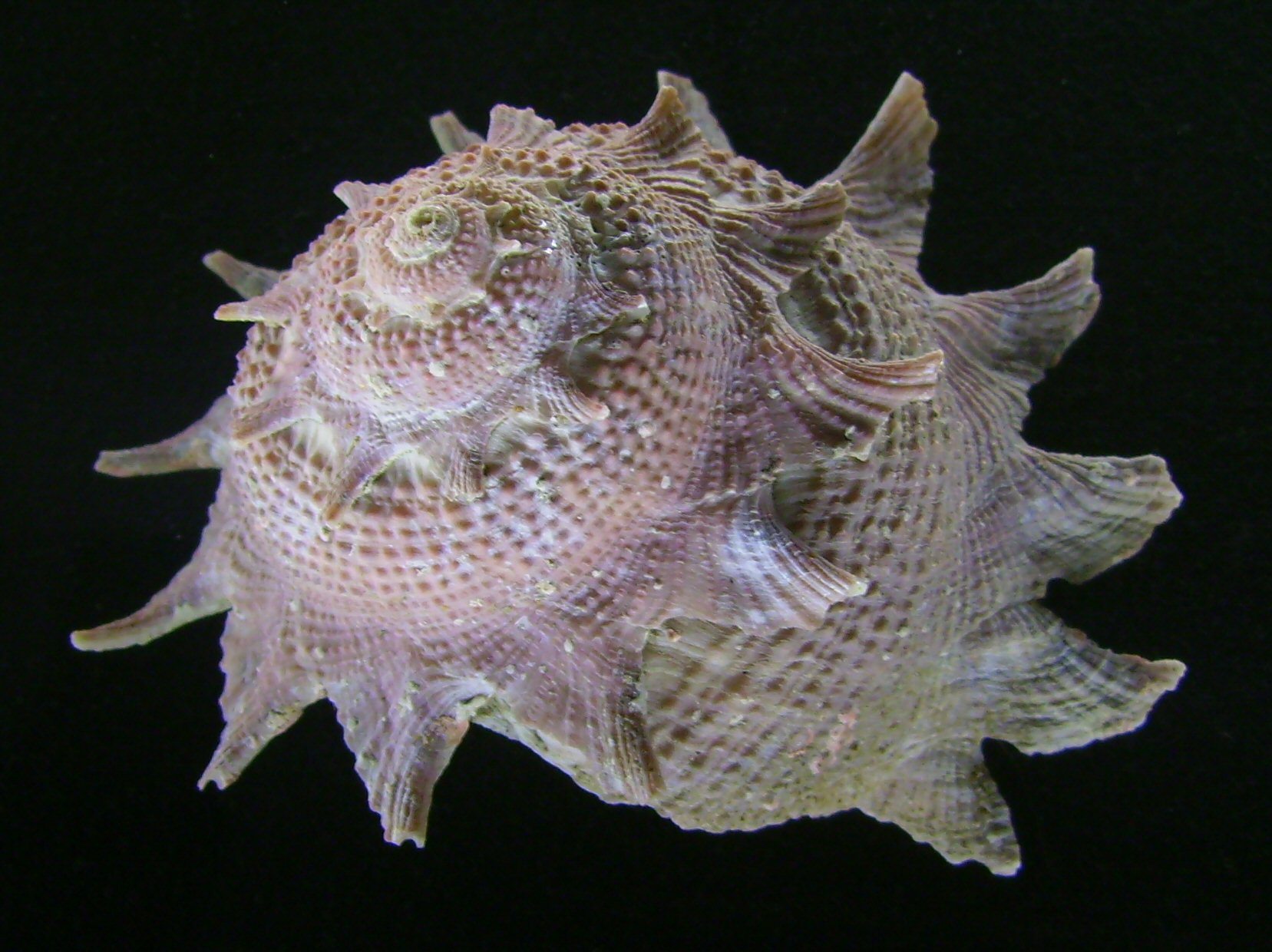
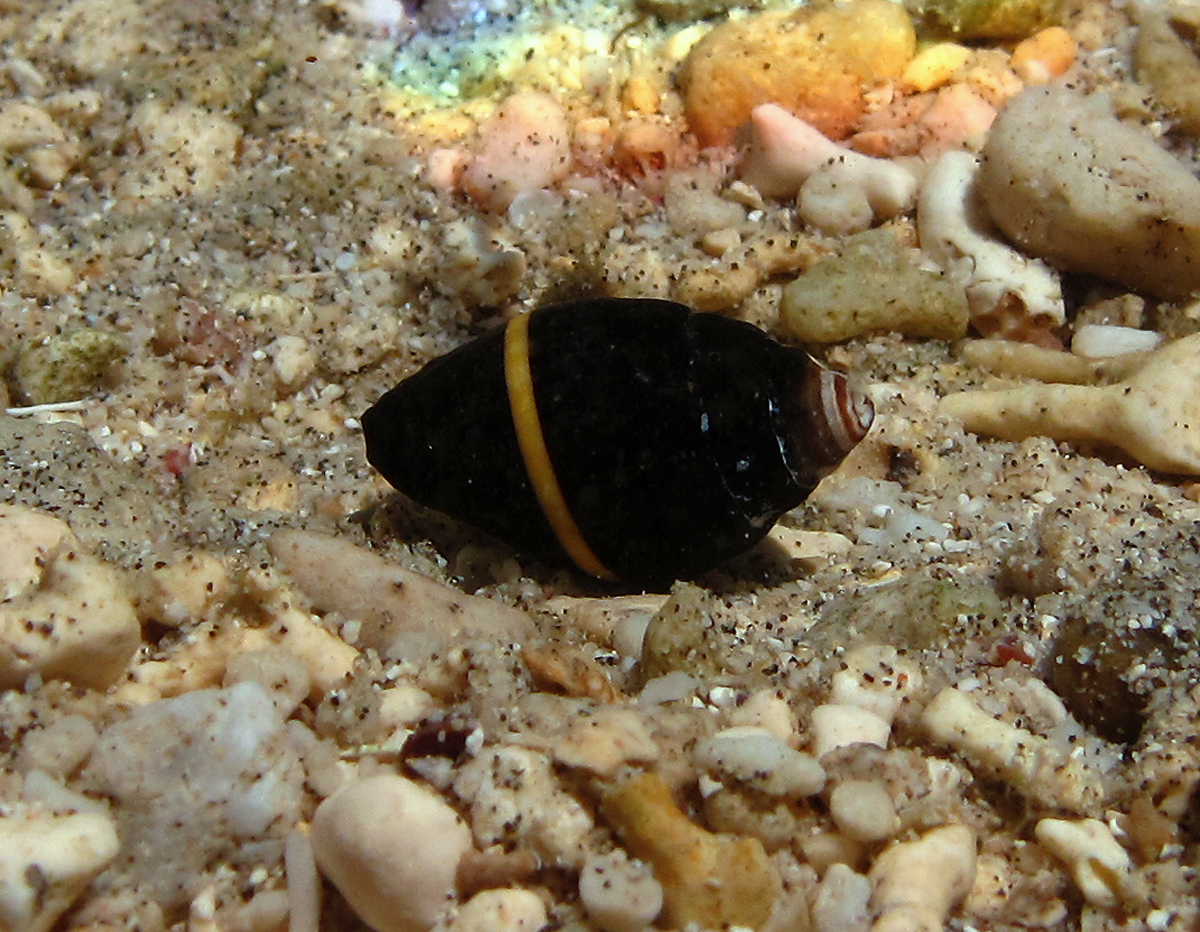
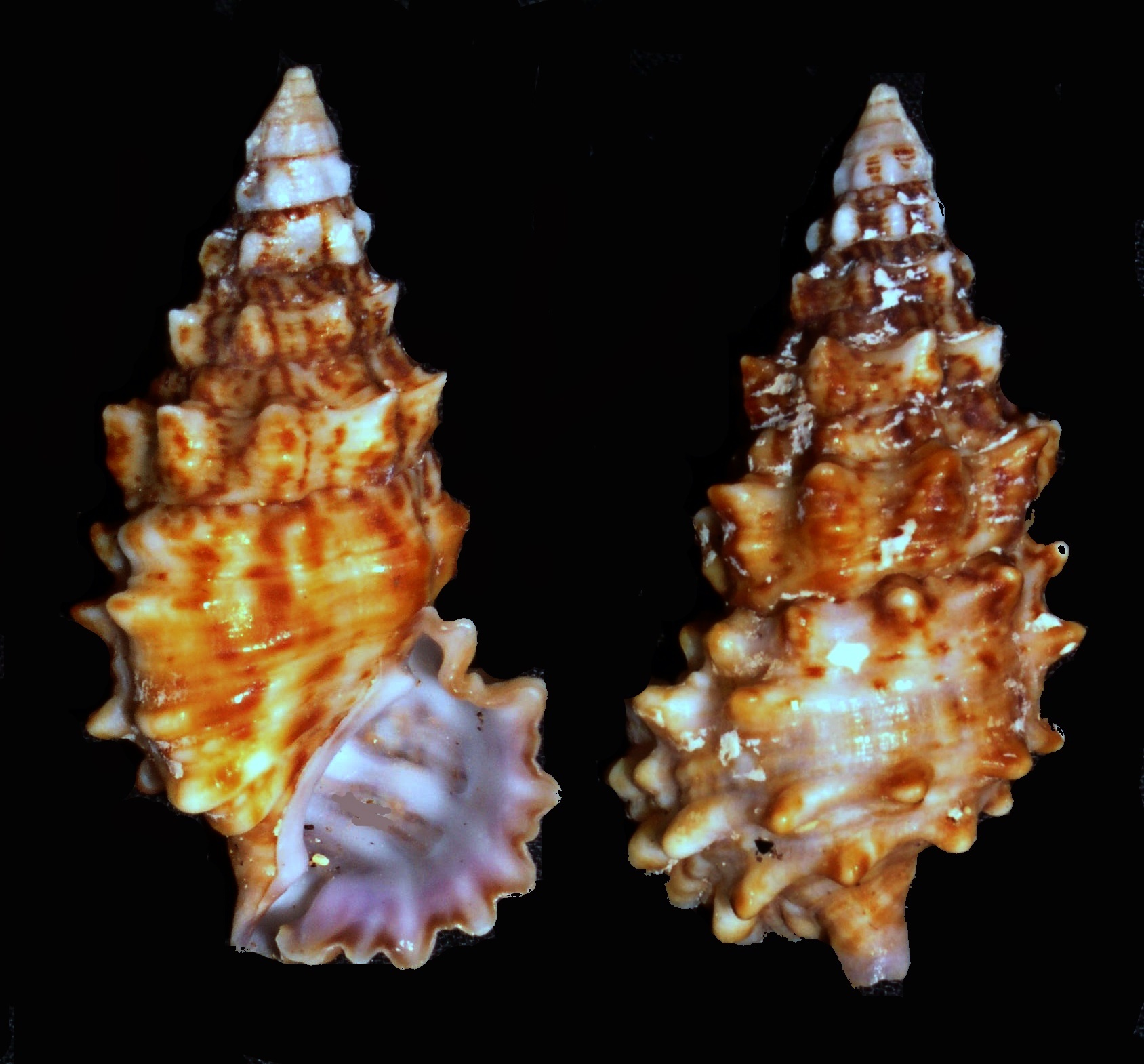
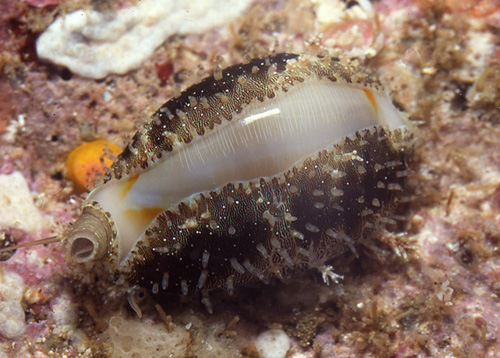
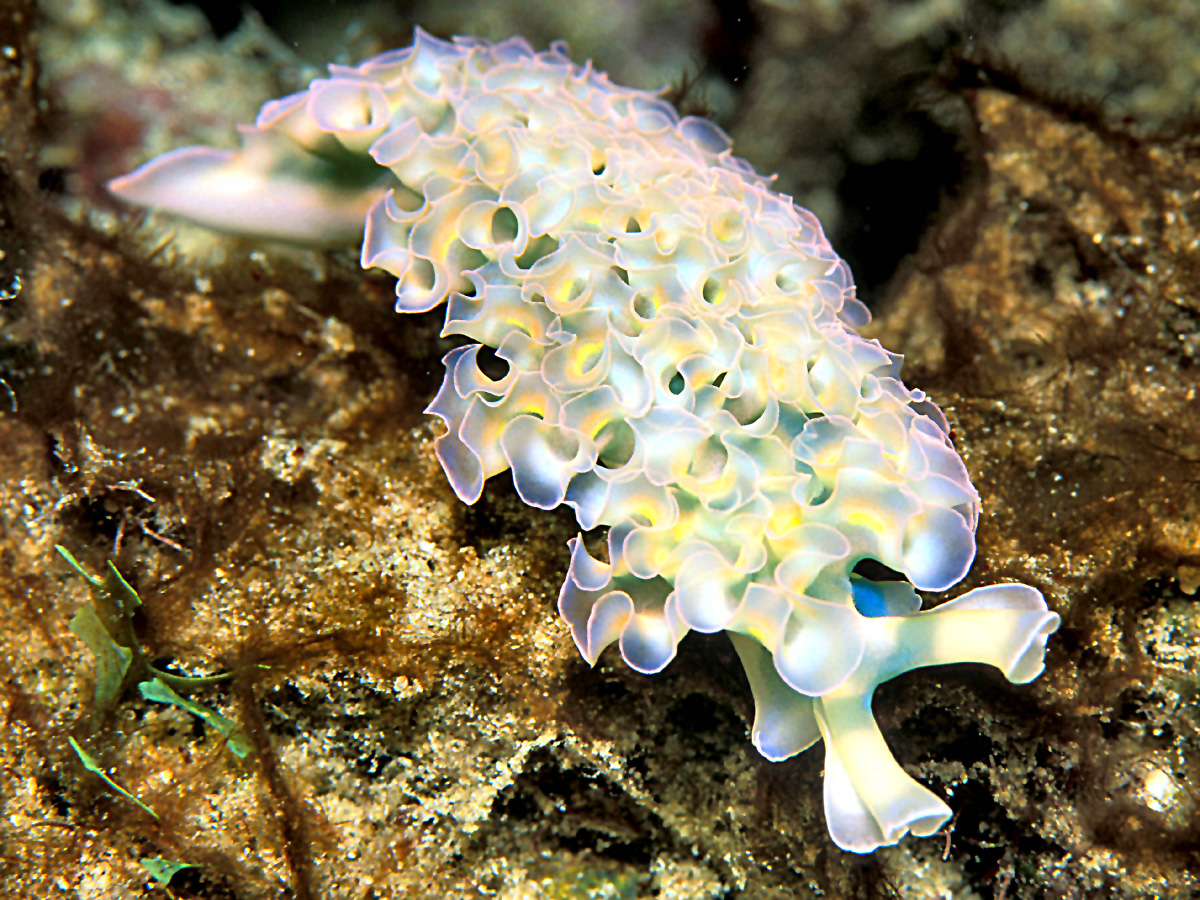
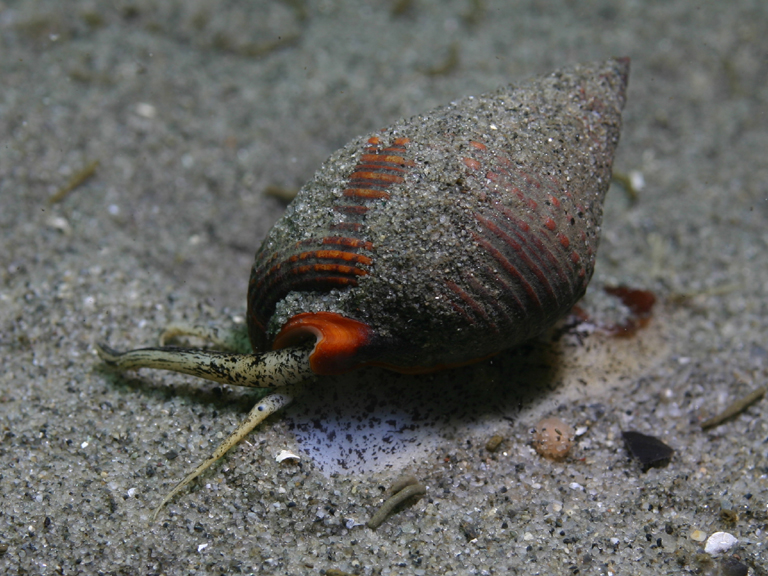
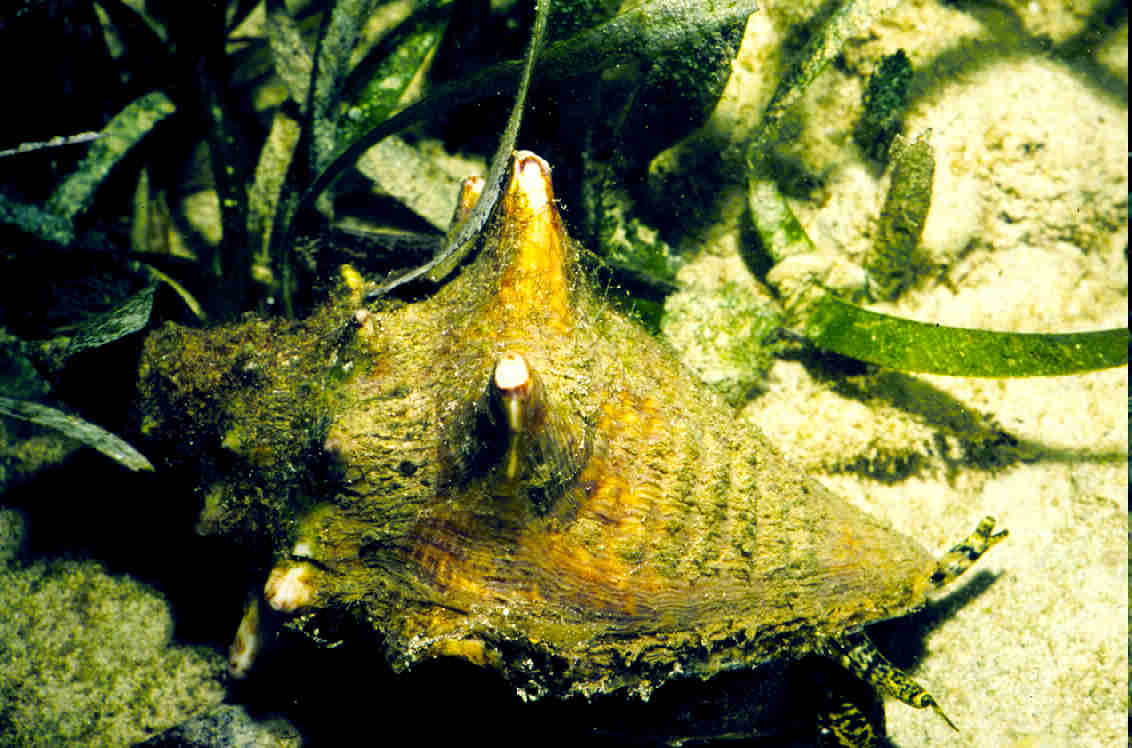
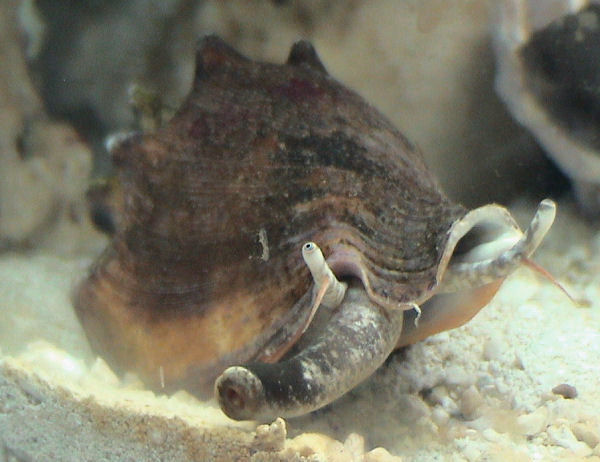
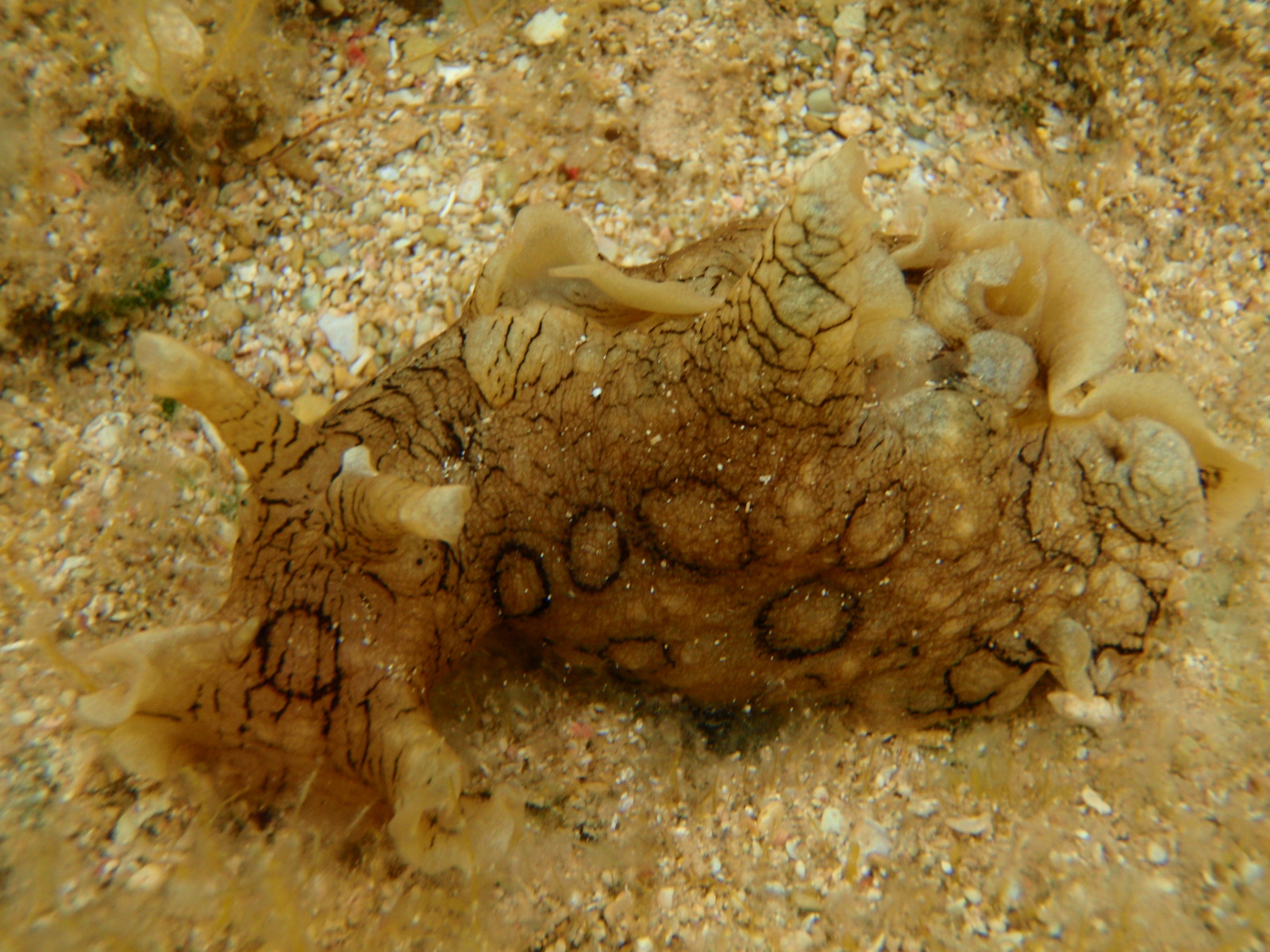
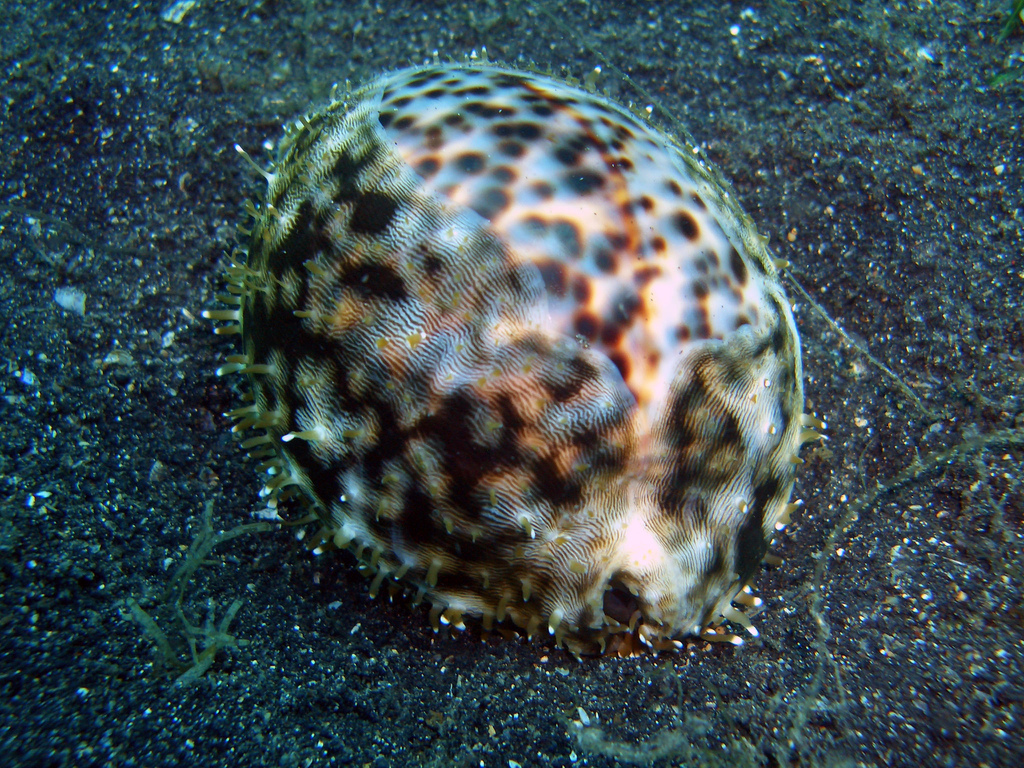
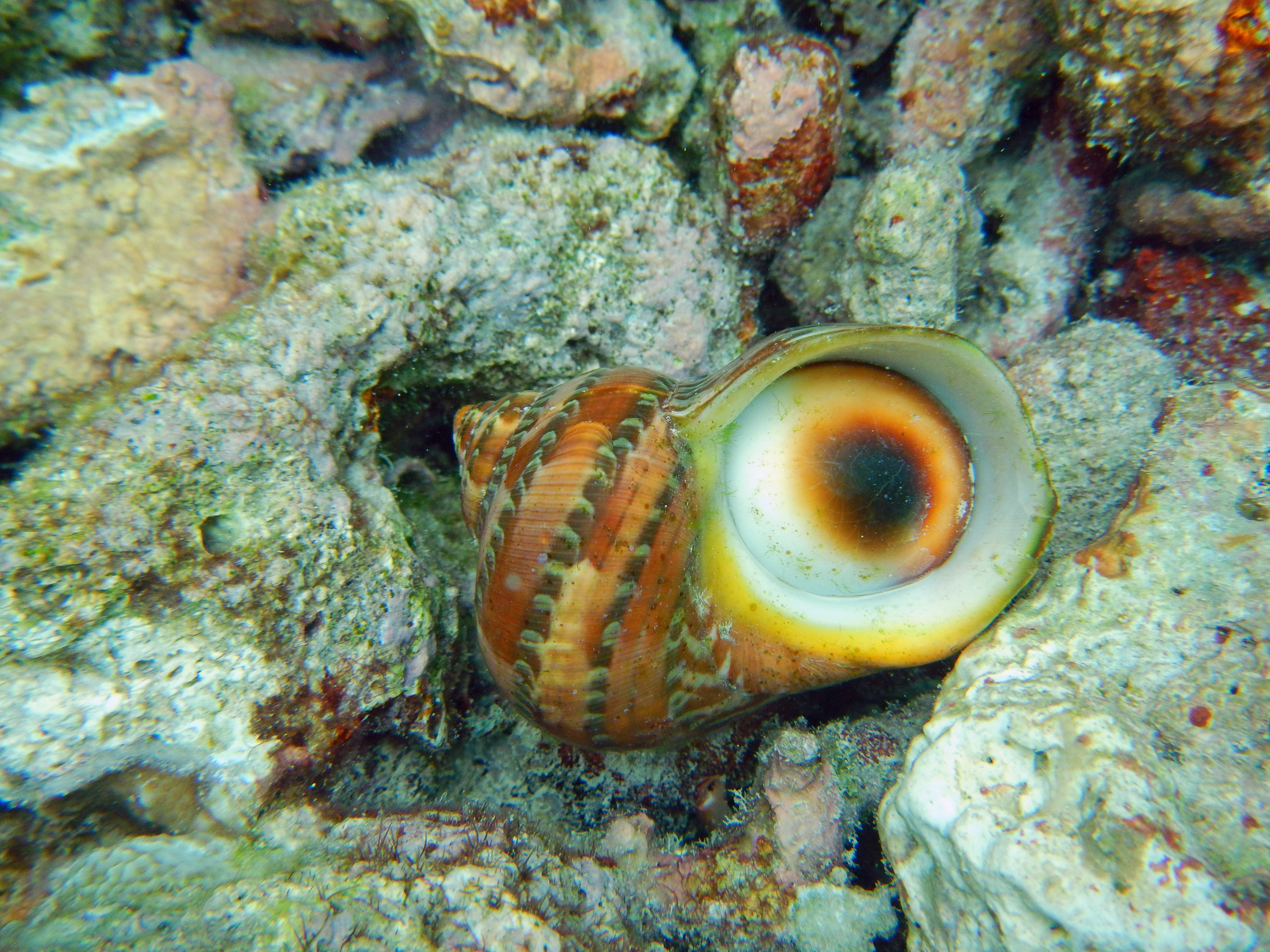
Common name	Image	Taxonomy	Reef safe	Care Level	Description	Max size
Abalone	LivingAbalone	Haliotis sp.	Yes	Easy		12 cm (4.7 in)
Arabian Cowrie		Cypraea arabica				10 cm (3.9 in)
Astraea snail		Astraea sp.	Yes	Easy		2.5–10 cm (1.0–3.9 in)
Bumble bee snail		Engina mendicaria	Yes	Easy		1.5 cm (0.6 in)
Cerith snail		Cerithium sp.	Yes	Easy		3.5 cm (1.4 in)
Gold ring cowrie		Cypraea annulus				5 cm (2.0 in)
Lettuce sea slug		Elysia sp., usually Elysia crispata	Yes	Moderate	A sacoglossan sea slug with folded parapodia (side appendages), that give it a lettuce-like appearance. They feed on algae, and incorporate algal chloroplasts into their cells. Color ranges from brownish to green, and can include blues, yellows, and pinks.	5 cm (2.0 in)
Nassarius snail		Nassarius sp.	Yes	Easy		2.5 cm (1.0 in)
Queen conch		Eustrombus gigas	Yes, but may knock over loose rocks and coral.			30 cm (11.8 in)
Sand conch		Strombidae	Yes	Easy
Sea Hare		Aplysiomorpha sp., usually Aplysia sp. or Dolabella sp.	Yes	Expert		4–10 cm (1.6–3.9 in)
Tiger cowrie,		Cypraea tigris				15 cm (5.9 in)
Trochus snail		Trochus sp.	Yes	Easy		3–7 cm (1.2–2.8 in)
Turbo snail		Turbo sp.	Yes	Easy		5–10 cm (2.0–3.9 in)

=== Cephalopods ===
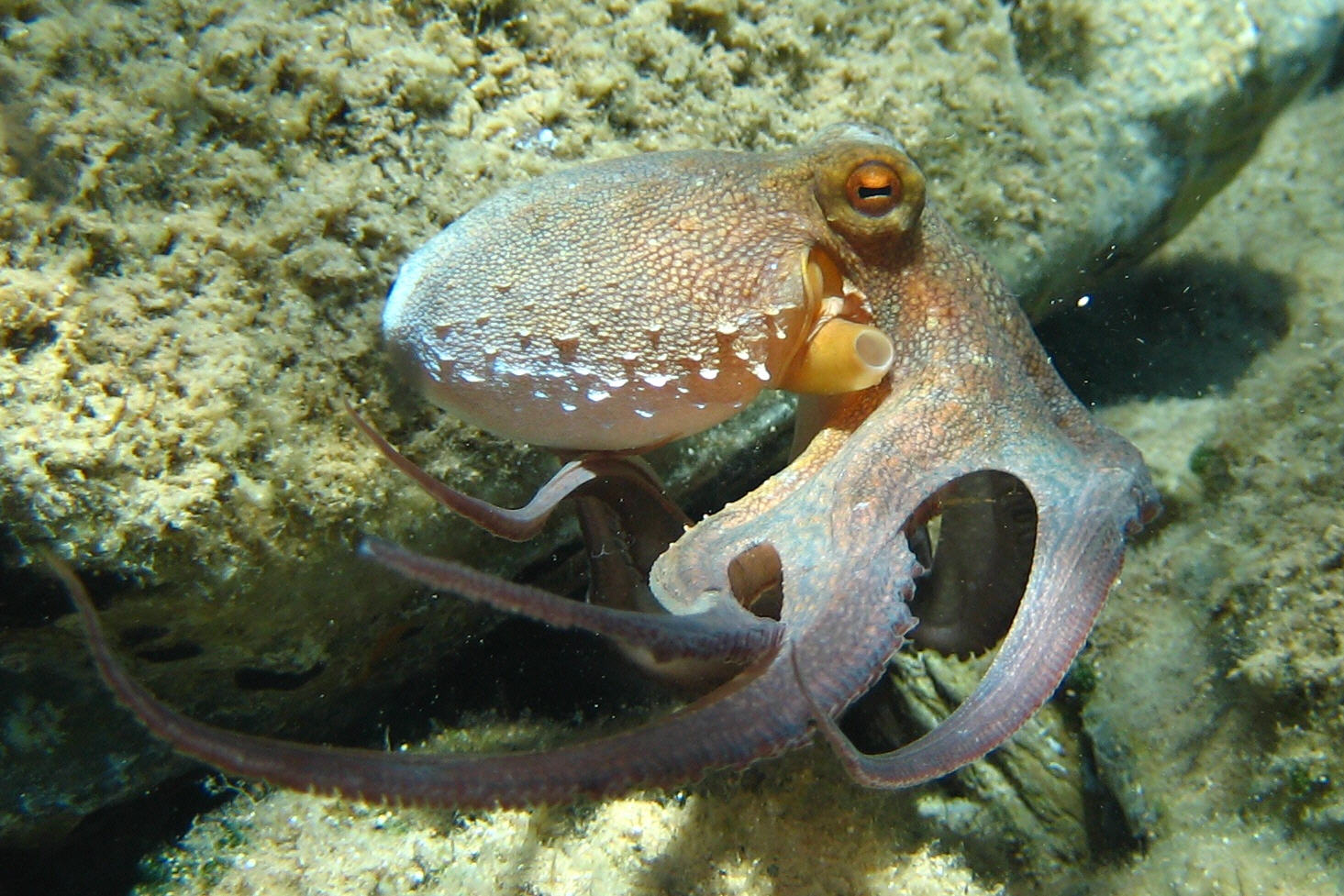
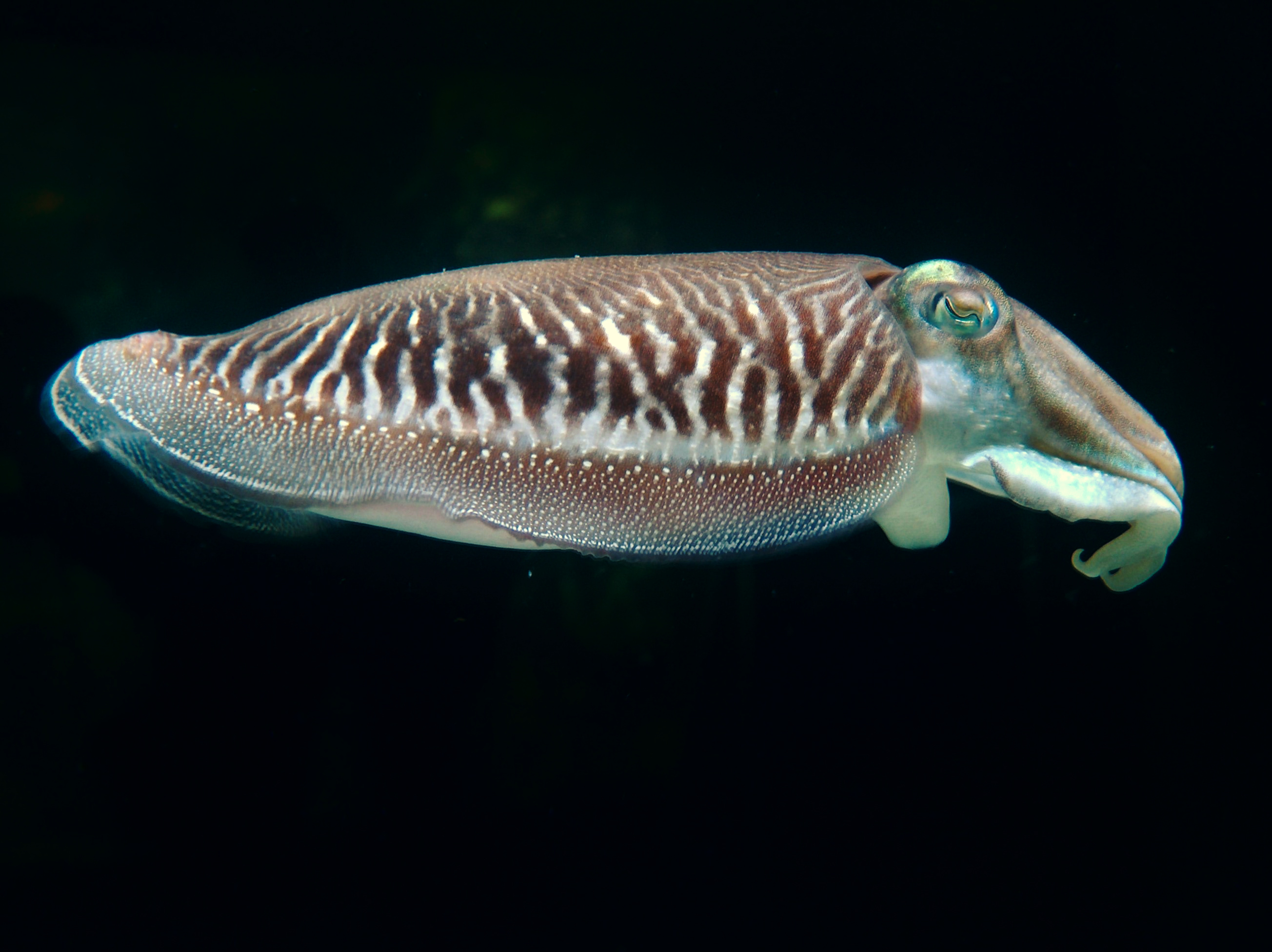
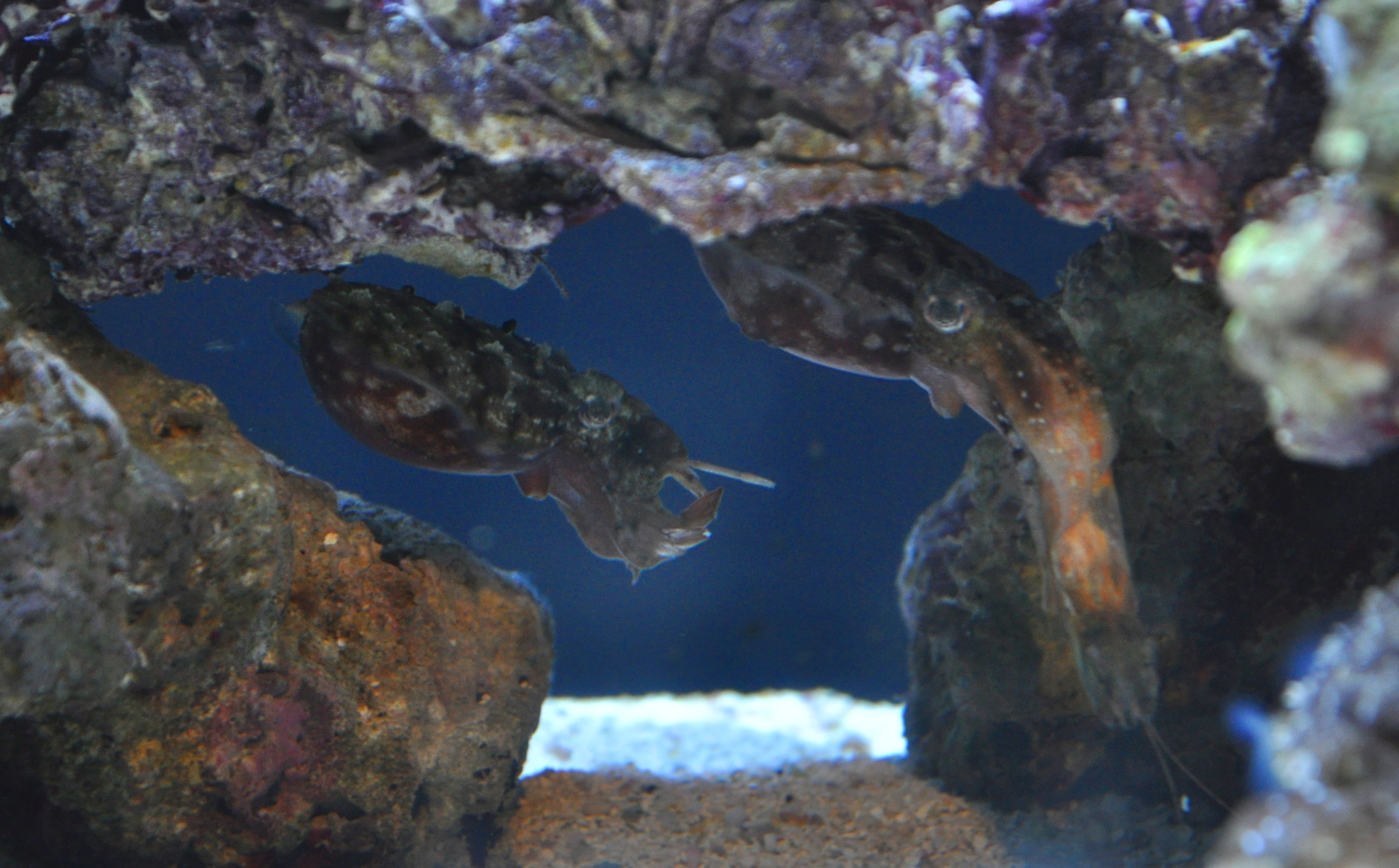
Common name	Image	Taxonomy	Reef safe	Care Level	Description	Max size
Common tropical octopus	Octopus vulgaris2	Octopus vulgaris	No	Expert		Mantle: 25 cm (9.8 in) Arms: 1 m (3.3 ft)
Dwarf cuttlefish		Sepia bandensis	No	Expert		Mantle: 45 cm (17.7 in)
European common cuttlefish	Dwarf cuttlefish (Sepia bandensis)	Sepia officinalis	No	Expert		Mantle: 10 cm (3.9 in)

== Sea anemones ==
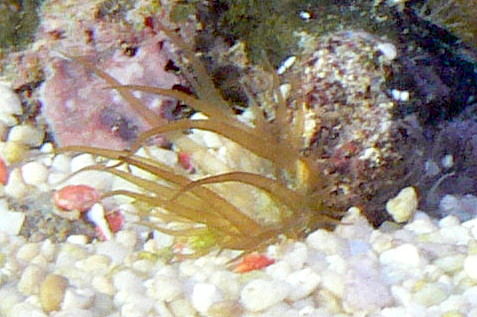
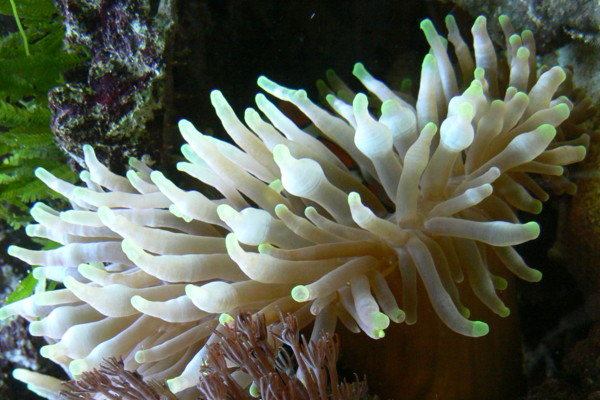
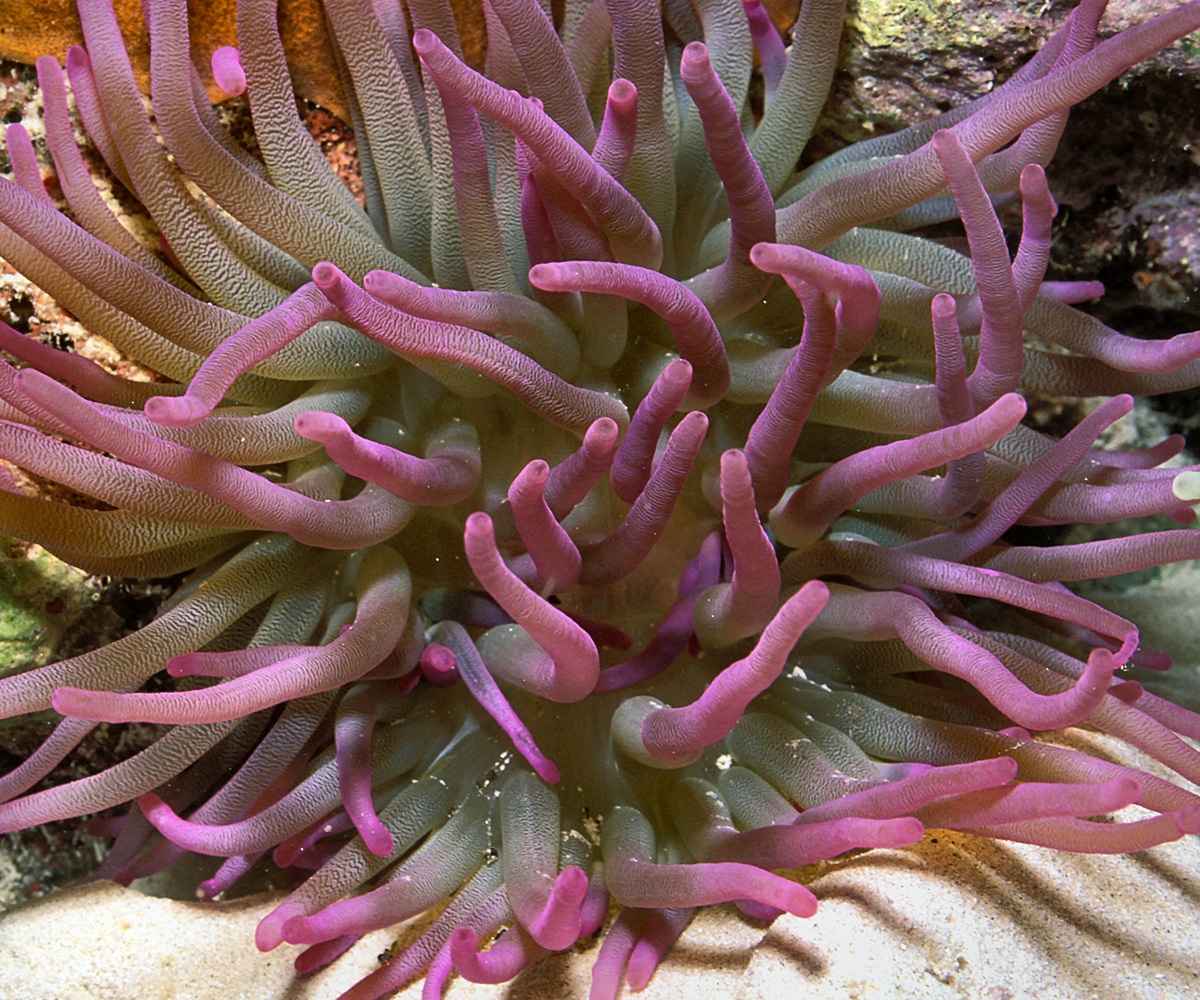
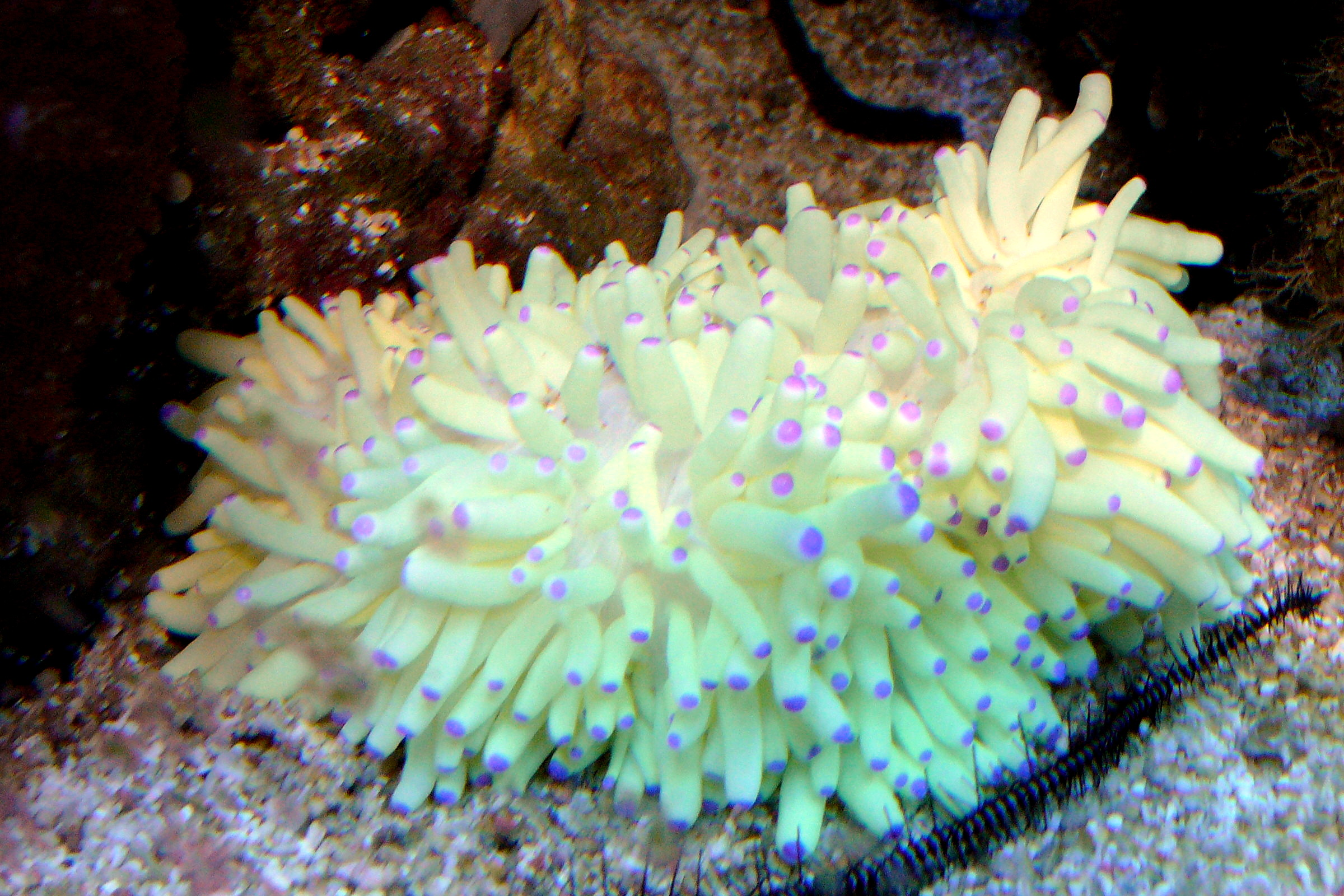
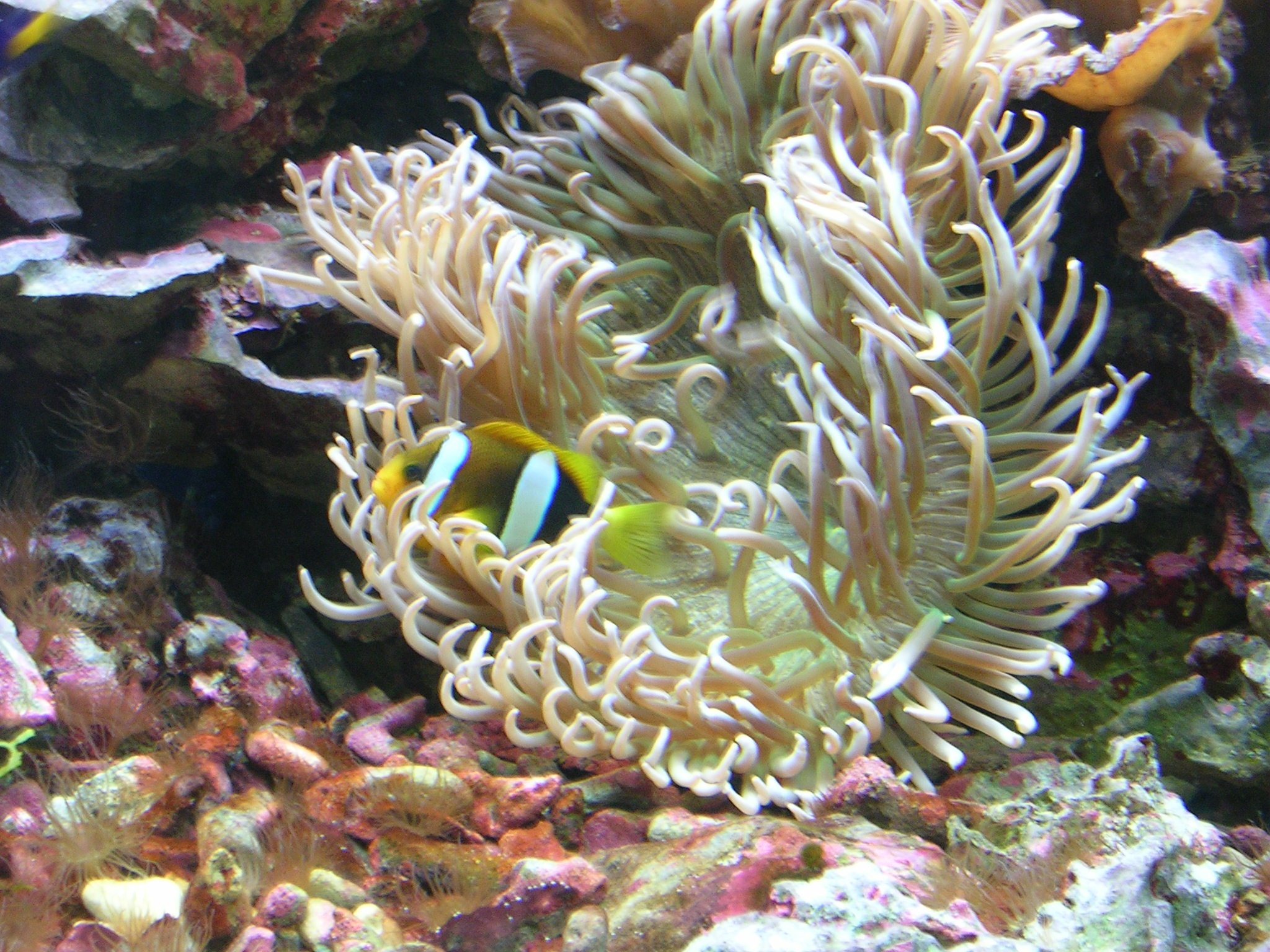
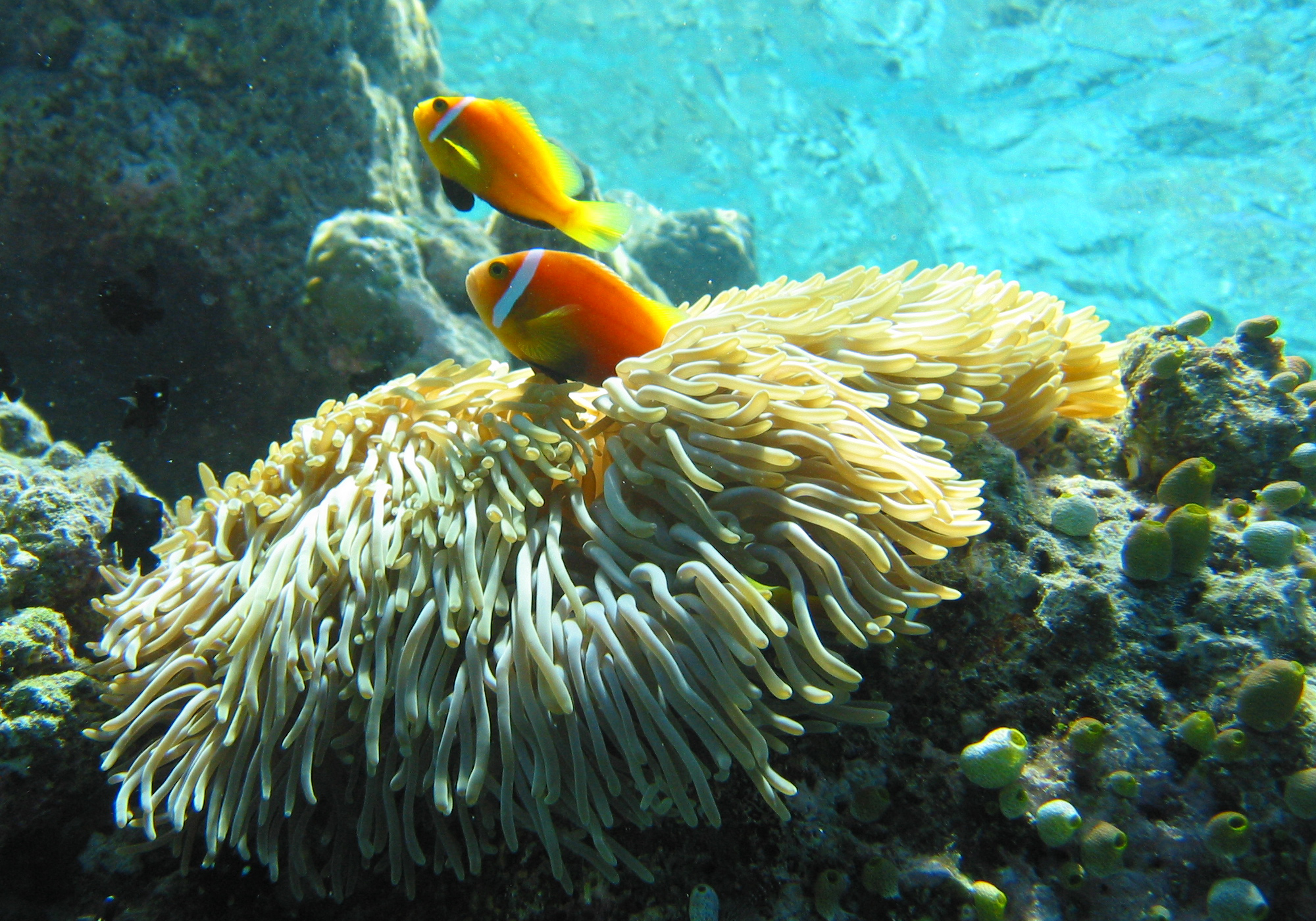
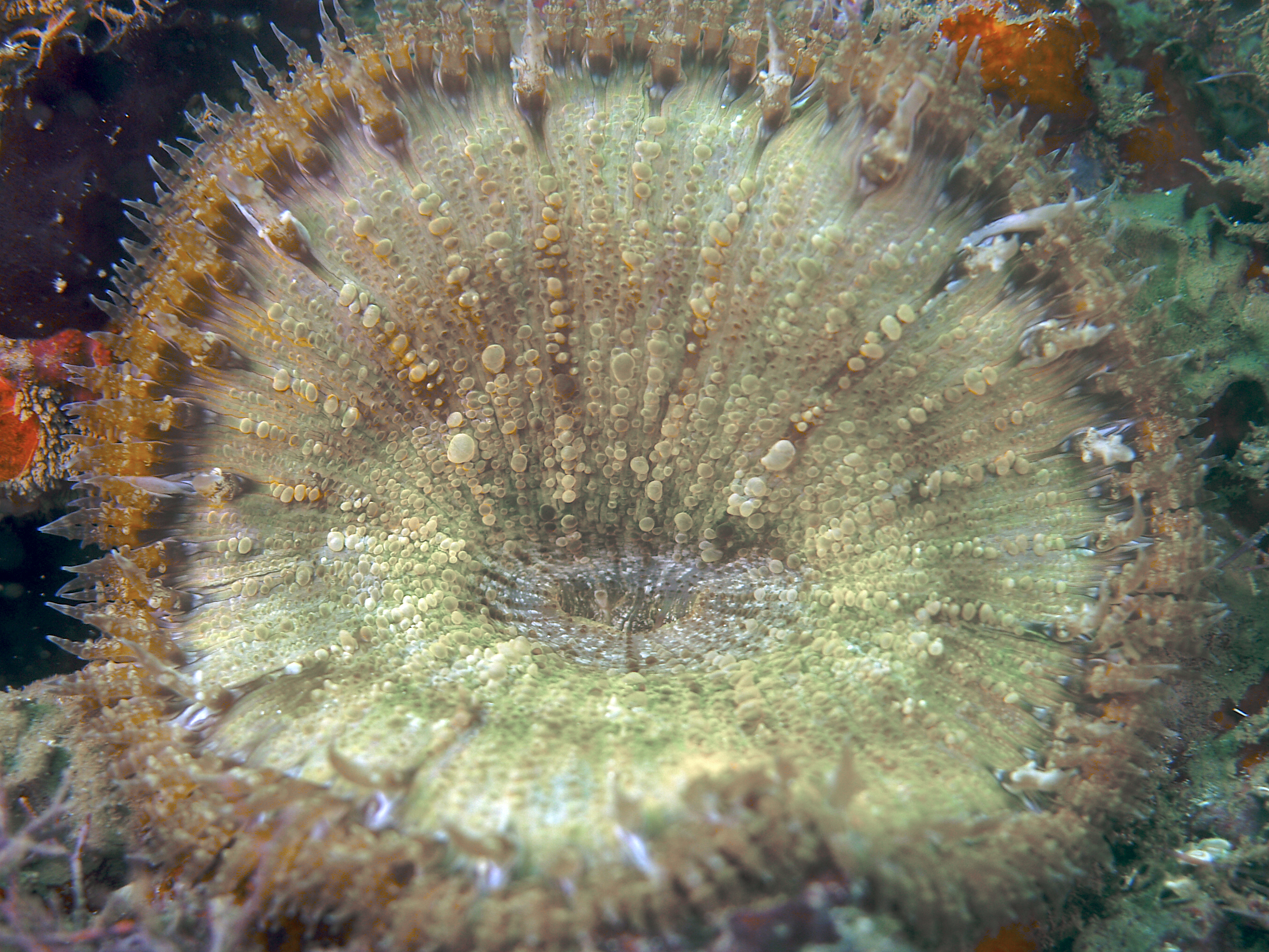
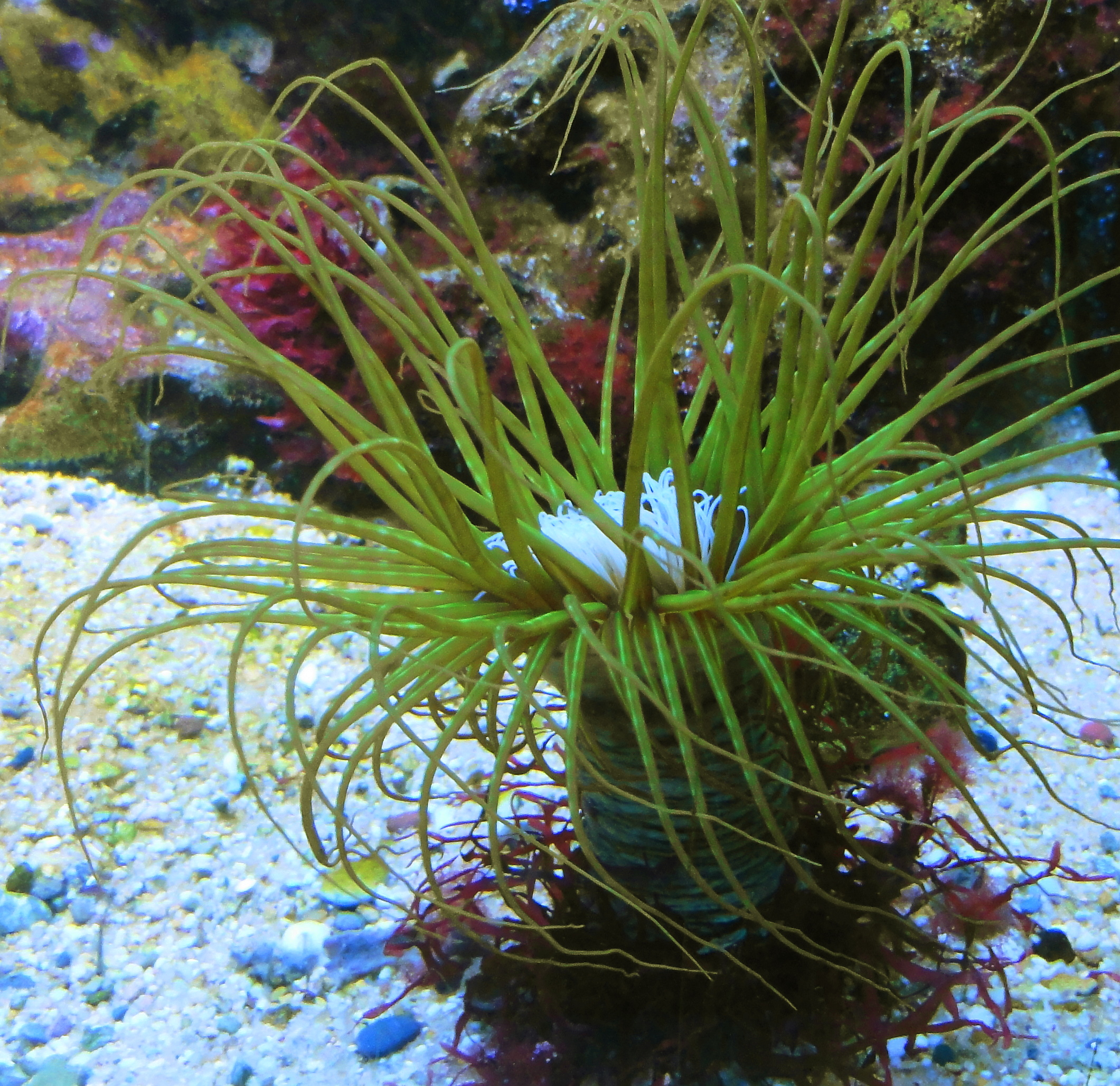
Common name	Image	Taxonomy	Reef safe	Care Level	Description	Max size
Aptasia		Aiptasia sp.	No		A common pest species in marine aquariums which spreads rapidly and harms corals and invertebrates with their sting. Can sting fish, but fatalities are rare. Notoriously difficult to eradicate, but a number of organisms can be used for control, including peppermint shrimp and Berghia verrucicornis.
Bubble-tip anemone		Entacmaea quadricolor	With caution	Moderate	A relatively easy to keep anemone species, it is very colorful, and has distinctive bubble-like swellings on the tips of its tentacles.	30 cm (11.8 in)
Condy anemone		Condylactis gigantea	With caution	Moderate	Common anemone species in the aquarium trade. The base color is usually brown to white, often with color on tentacle tips. Many color variations exist, including magenta, purple, yellow, and green.	15 cm (5.9 in)
Delicate sea anemone		Heteractis malu	With caution	Difficult	Also known as the malu anemone or white sand anemone. Color tipped tentacles reach 4 cm in length. This anemone should not be placed on a rock, it prefers a sandy substrate to bury its base in.	20 cm (7.9 in)
Long tentacled anemone		Macrodactyla doreensis	With caution	Moderate		50 cm (19.7 in)
Magnificent anemone		Heteractis magnifica	With caution	Expert	One of the most difficult anemone species to keep healthy in captivity.	1 m (3.3 ft)
Rock flower anemone		Phymanthus crucifer	With caution	Moderate
Tube anemone		Cerianthus sp.	Yes	Moderate	Not a true anemone (actinarian), but a member of the order Ceriantharia. Can make a very colorful aquarium specimen, colored with pinks, purples and sometimes shades of fluorescent green.

== Sponges ==
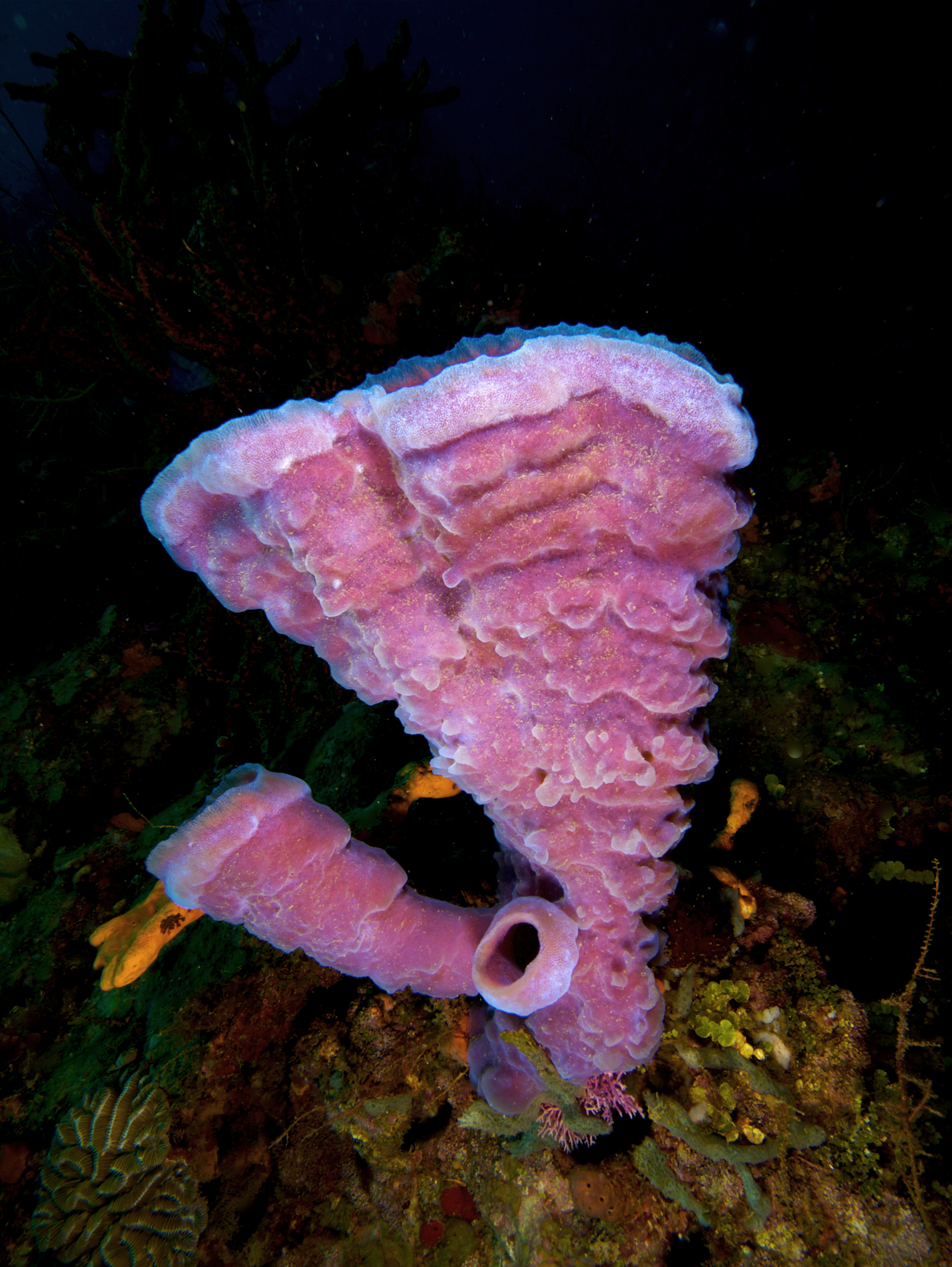
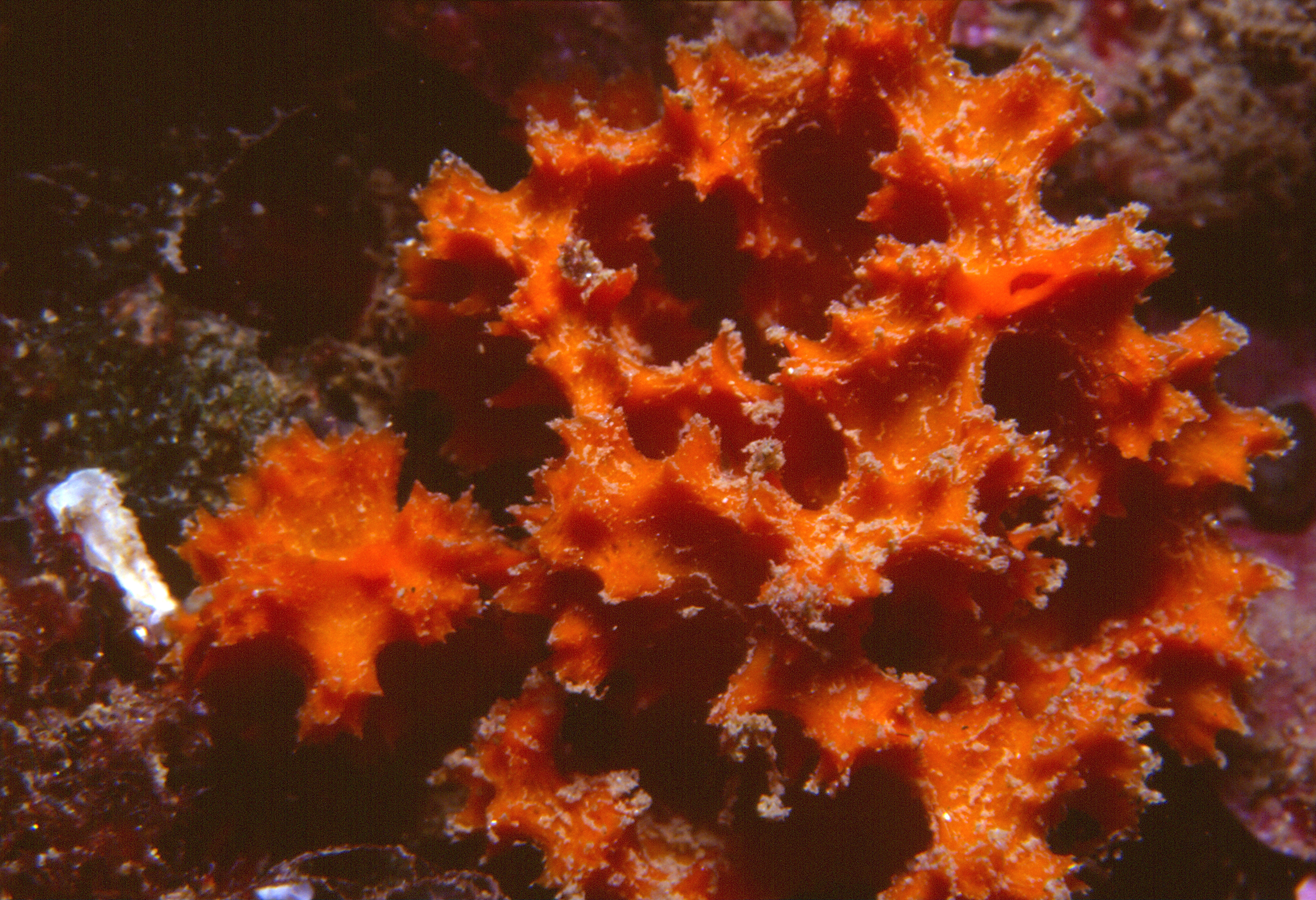
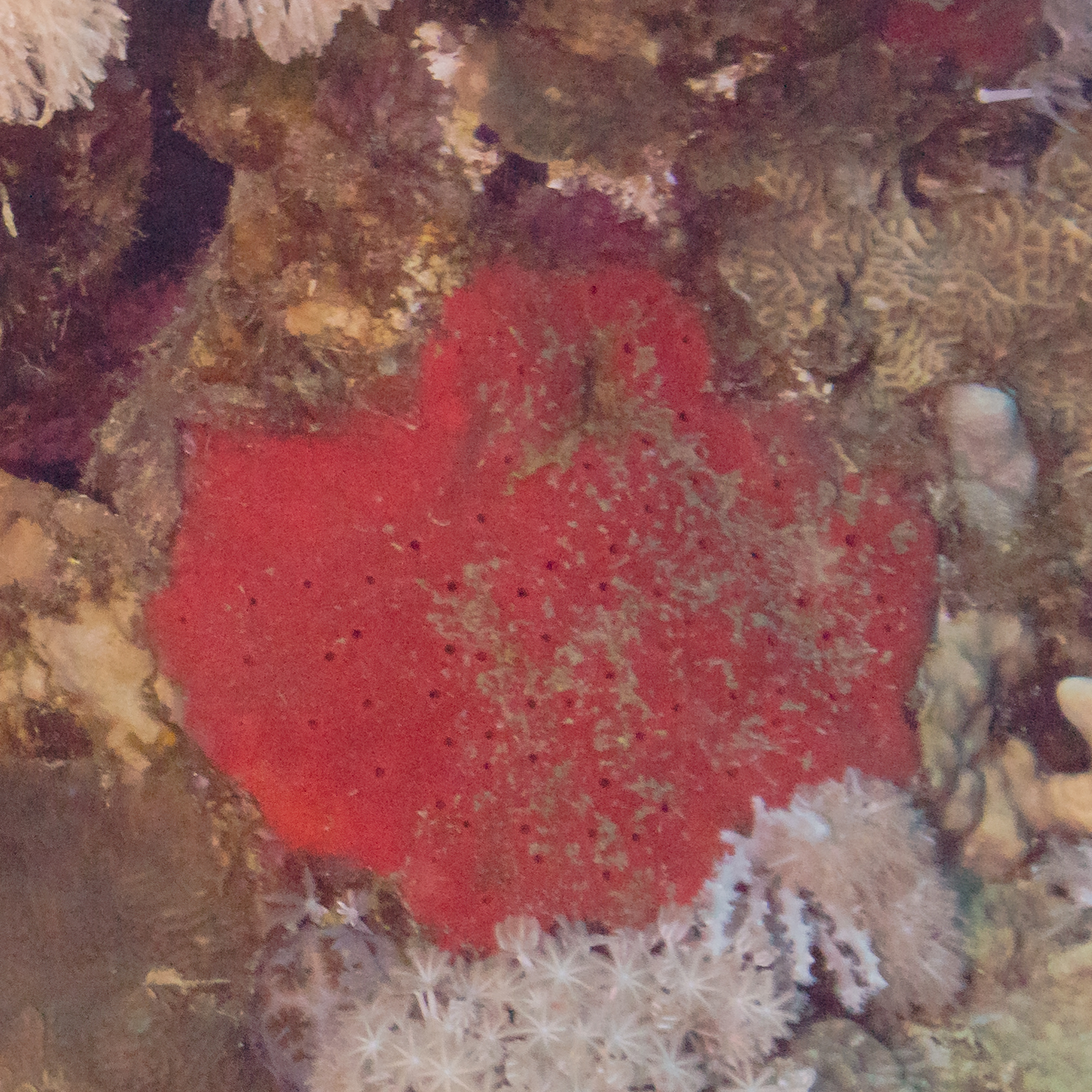
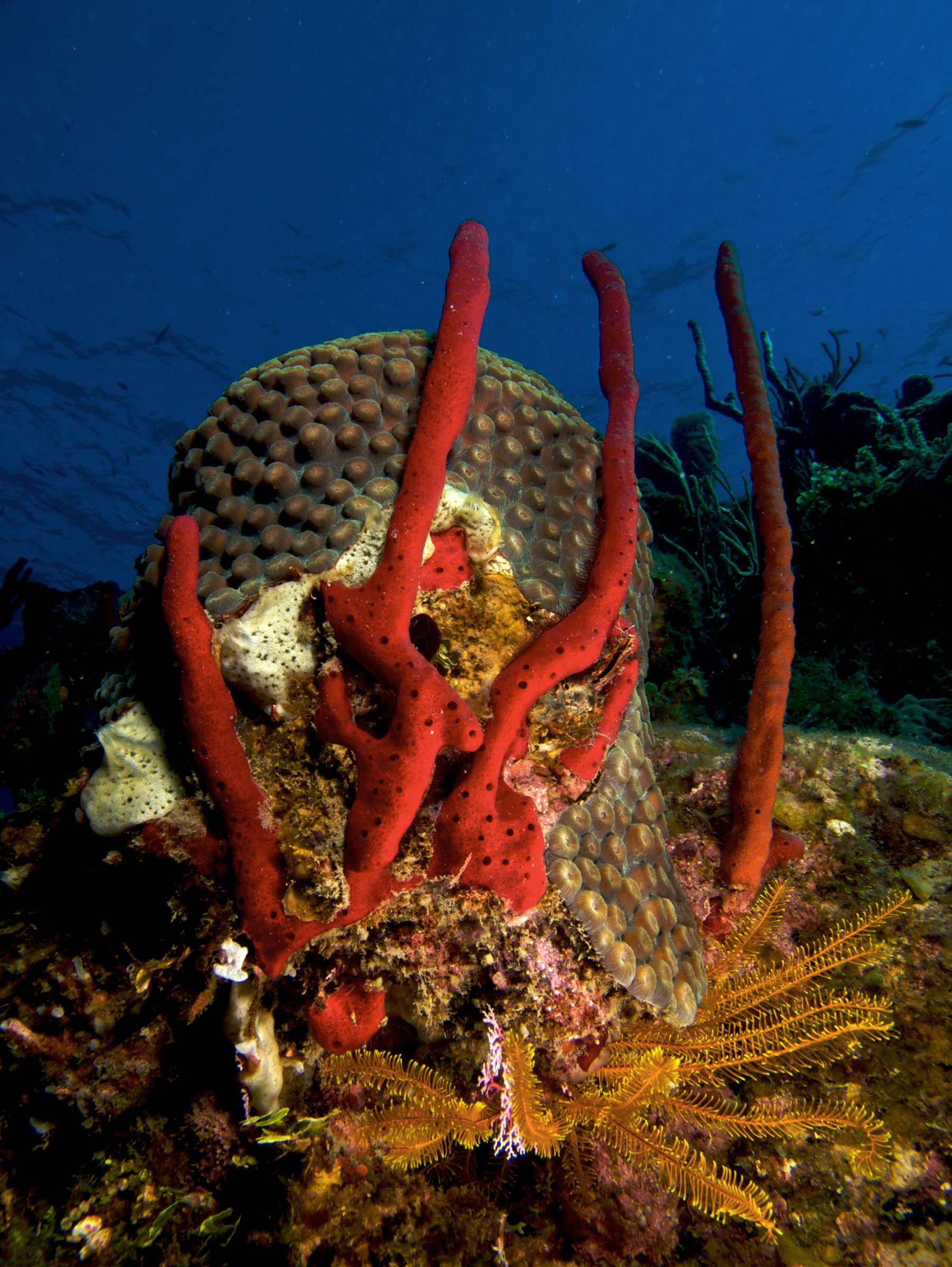
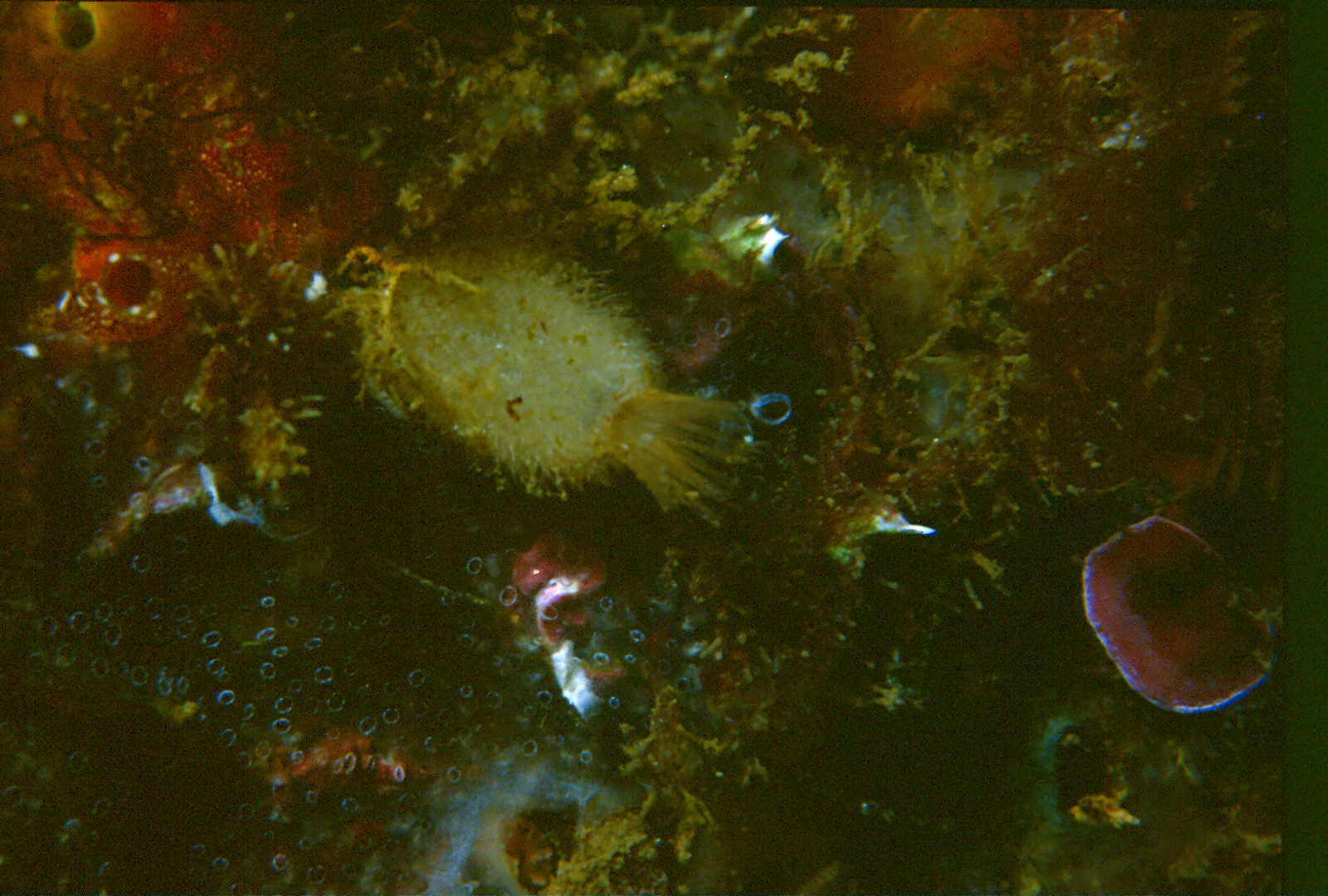
Common name	Image	Taxonomy	Reef safe	Care Level	Description	Max size
Ball sponge		Cinachyra allocladia	Yes	Expert
Branching vase sponge		Callyspongia vaginalis	Yes	Expert
Bee sponge		Acanthella sp.	Yes	Expert
Orange ball sponge		Cinachyra kuekenthali	Yes	Expert
Orange fan sponge		Axinella bookhouti	Yes	Expert
Red ball sponge		Dragmacidon lunaecharta	Yes	Expert
Red tree sponge		Amphimedon compressa	Yes	Expert
Pineapple Sponge		Sycon	Yes		Commonly regarded as a pest species

== Tunicates ==
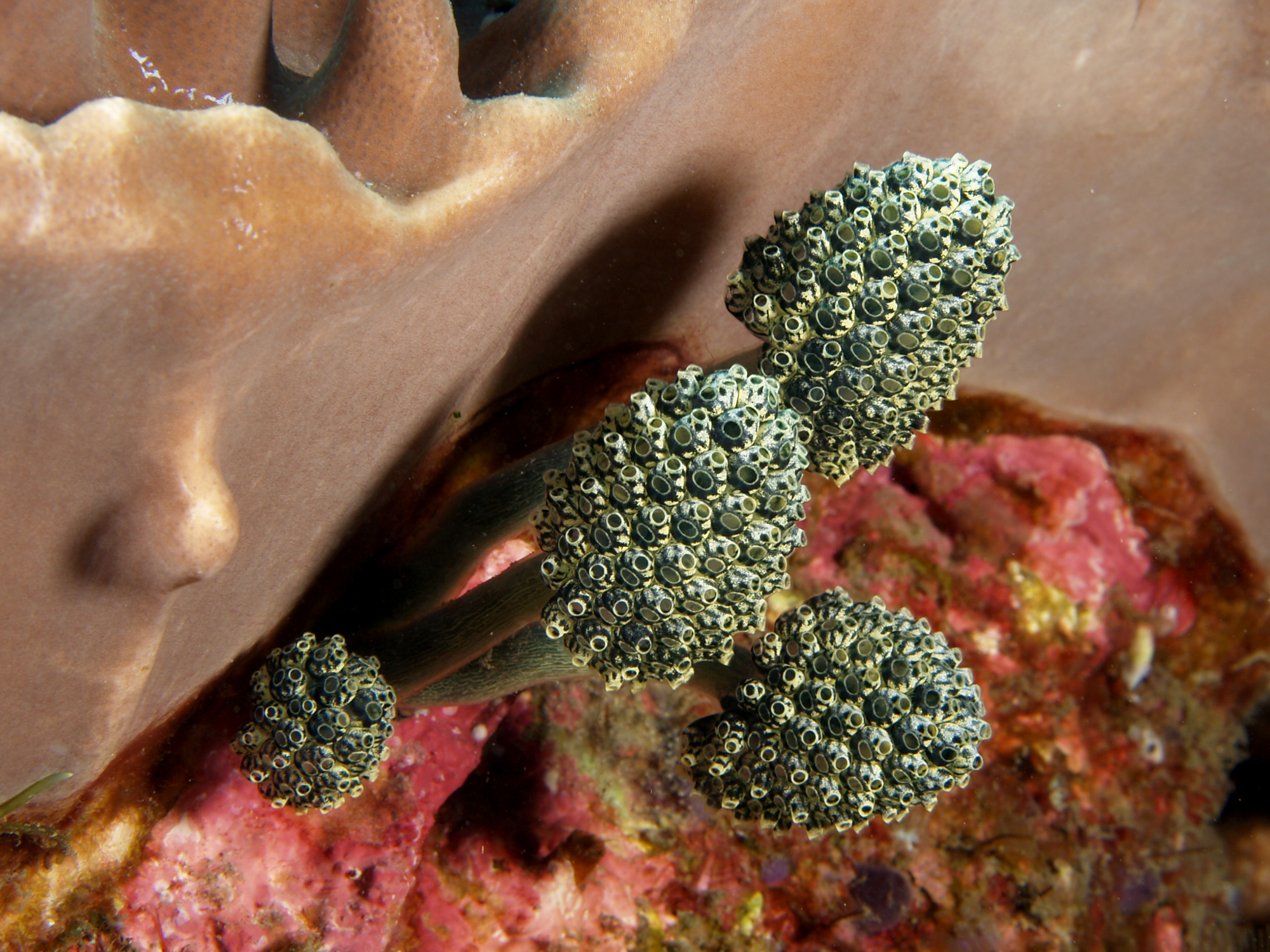
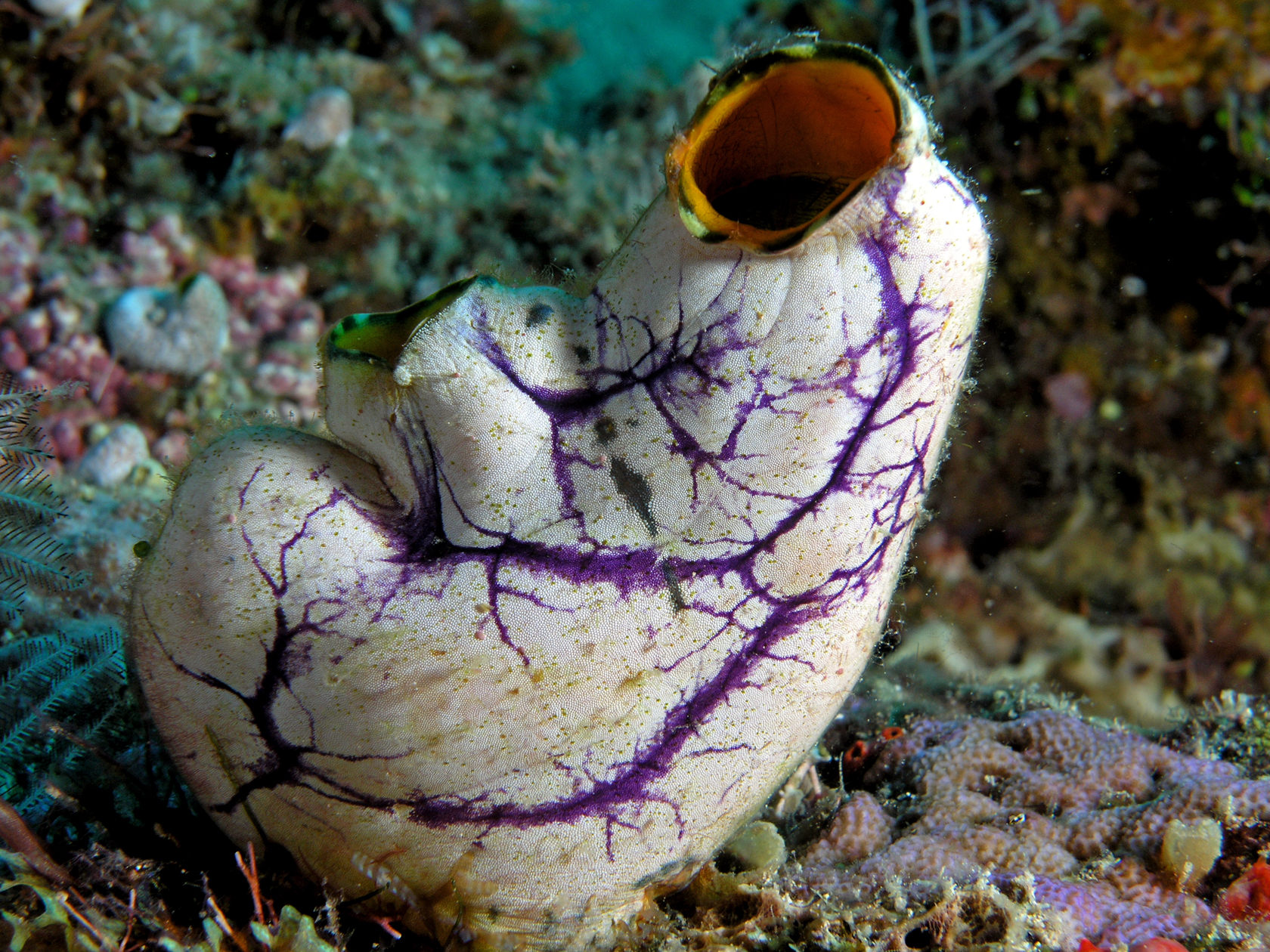
Common name(s)	Image	Taxonomy	Reef safe	Care Level	Description	Max size
Blue lollipop tunicate		Nephtheis fascicularis	Yes	Expert		7.5 cm (3.0 in)
Golden sea squirt, Ink-spot sea squirt		Polycarpa aurata	Yes	Moderate		15 cm (5.9 in)

== See also ==
- List of marine aquarium fish species
- List of marine aquarium plant species
- List of freshwater aquarium invertebrate species
- List of brackish aquarium invertebrate species
- Marine aquarium
- Reef aquarium
