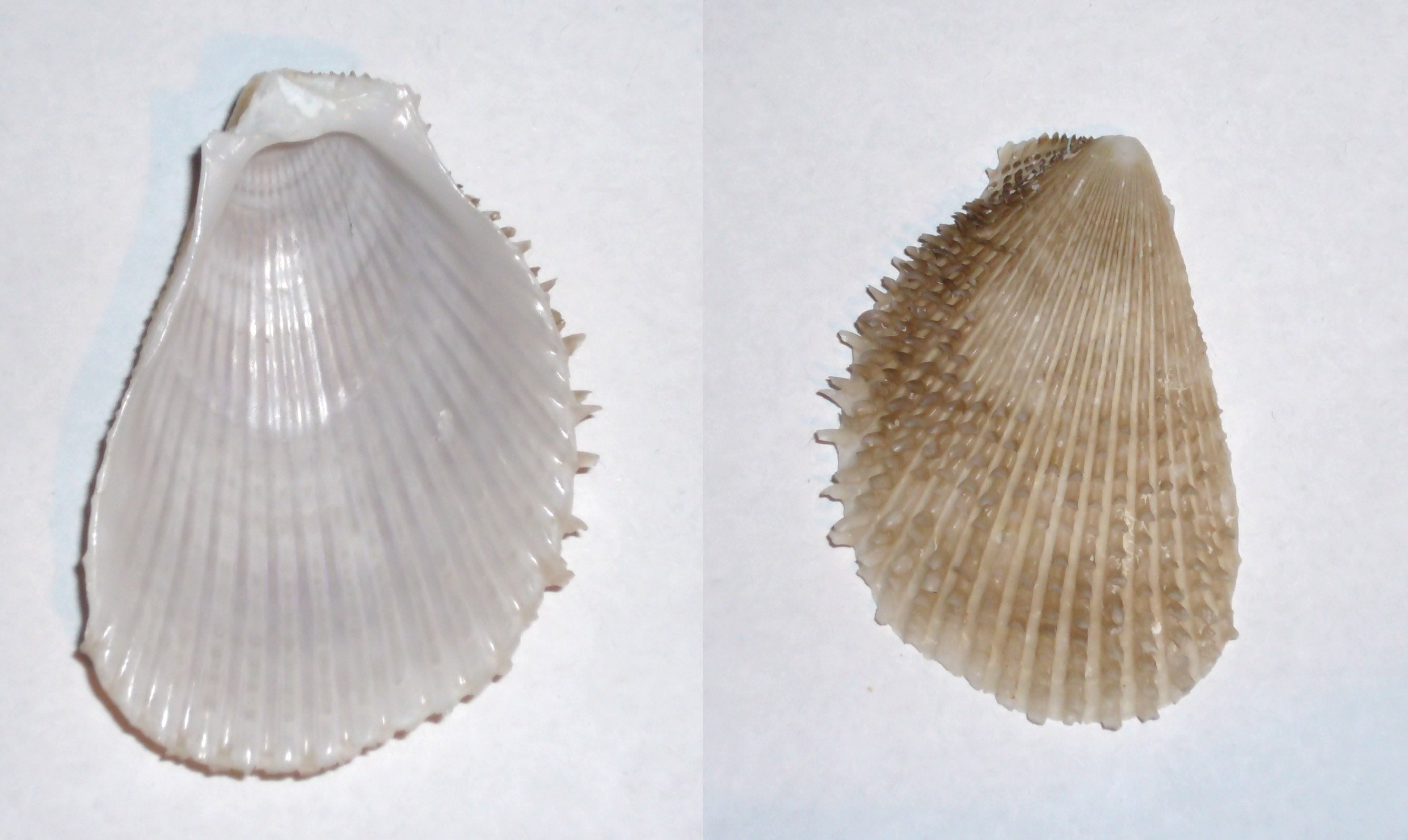
- Spiny fileclam, Lima lima

Scientific classification
- Kingdom: Animalia
- Phylum: Mollusca
- Class: Bivalvia
- Order: Limida
- Superfamily: Limoidea
- Family: Limidae
- Genus: Lima; Bruguière, 1789

Type species
- Lima alba Cuvier, 1797

Synonyms
- Austrolima Iredale, 1929; Fukama Kilburn, 1998; Lima (Lima) Bruguière, 1797· accepted, alternate representation; Lima (Mantellum) Röding, 1798; Limaria Rafinesque, 1815 (invalid: unnecessary substitute name for Lima and junior homonym of Limaria Link, 1807); Mantellum Röding, 1798; Meotolima Oyama, 1943; Radula Mörch, 1853 (invalid: junior homonym of Radula Gray, 1842)

= Lima (bivalve) =

Lima Temporal range: Jurassic–Recent

Genus of bivalves

Lima is a genus of file shells or file clams, marine bivalve molluscs in the family Limidae, the file shells, within the subclass Pteriomorphia.

The shells are obliquely trigonal, and strongly radially ribbed, the ribs scabrous to spinose.

The soft parts are bright red and many tentacles protrude from the open valves.

== Species ==
- Lima attenuata (Dall, 1916)
- † Lima becki C. A. Fleming, 1955
- Lima benthonimbifer Iredale, 1925
- Lima bullifera Deshayes in Maillard, 1863
- Lima caribaea d'Orbigny, 1853
- † Lima carolina d'Orbigny, 1850
- † Lima colorata Hutton, 1873
- † Lima crenulicosa Roemer, 1849
- Lima disalvoi Raines, 2002
- Lima fujitai Oyama, 1943
- Lima hyperborea Jensen, 1909
- Lima kimthachi Thach, 2016
- Lima lima (Linnaeus, 1758) - spiny fileclam
- Lima marioni P. Fischer, 1882
- Lima messura (Kilburn, 1998)
- Lima nakayasui Habe, 1987
- Lima nasca (F. R. Bernard, 1988)
- Lima nimbifer Iredale, 1924
- Lima ogasawaraensis Habe, 1993
- † Lima paleata Hutton, 1873
- Lima paucicostata G. B. Sowerby II, 1843
- Lima quantoensis Yokoyama, 1920
- † Lima robini C. A. Fleming, 1950
- Lima sagamiensis Masahito, Kuroda & Habe in Kuroda, 1971
- Lima sabauriculata (Montagu, 1808)
- Lima spectata (Iredale, 1929)
- Lima tahitensis E. A. Smith, 1885
- Lima tetrica Gould, 1851
- Lima tomlini Prashad, 1932
- Lima tropicalis (Iredale, 1939)
- † Lima vasis Marwick, 1928
- Lima vulgaris (Link, 1807)
- Lima vulgatula Yokoyama, 1922
- † Lima wacoensis Roemer, 1849
- † Lima waipipiensis P. Marshall & Murdoch, 1919
- † Lima watersi Marwick, 1926
- Lima zealandica G. B. Sowerby III, 1877
- Lima zushiensis Yokoyama, 1920

Synonyms

- Lima colorata zealandica sowerby, 1876: synonym of Lima zealandica G. B. Sowerby III, 1877
- Lima excavata (Fabricius, 1779) - excavated fileclam: synonym of Acesta excavata (Fabricius, 1779)
- Lima floridana Olsson and Harbison, 1953 - smooth fileclam: synonym of Ctenoides mitis (Lamarck, 1807)
- Lima hians (Gmelin, 1791): synonym of Limaria hians (Gmelin, 1791)
- Lima locklini McGinty, 1955 - locklin fileclam, skewed fileclam: synonym of Limaria locklini (McGinty, 1955)
- Lima pellucida C. B. Adams, 1846 - Antillean fileclam: synonym of Limaria pellucida (C. B. Adams, 1848)
- Lima scabra (Born, 1778) - rough file clam: synonym of Ctenoides scaber (Born, 1778)
- Lima squamosa Lamarck, 1819): synonym of Lima lima (Linnaeus, 1758)
- Lima subovata (Jeffreys, 1879) - subovate fileclam: synonym of Limatula subovata (Monterosato, 1875)
- Lima tenera G.B. Sowerby II, 1843: synonym of Ctenoides mitis (Lamarck, 1807)
