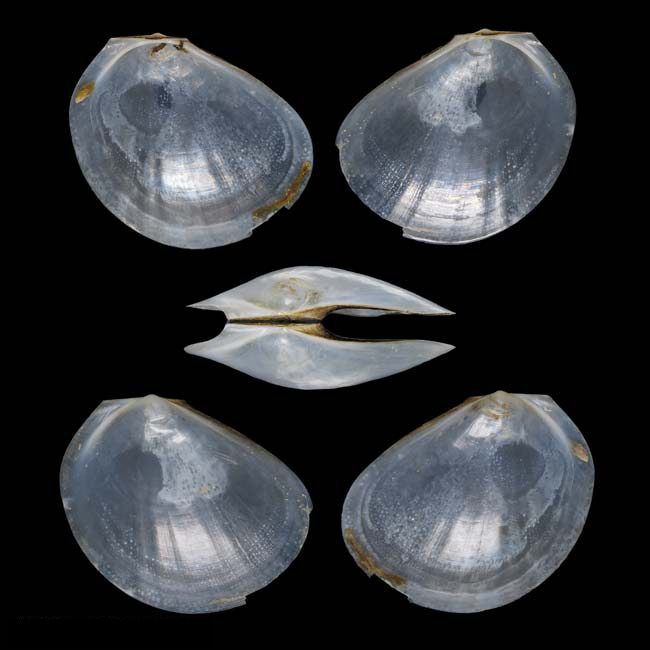
- Acesta vitrina

Scientific classification
- Kingdom: Animalia
- Phylum: Mollusca
- Class: Bivalvia
- Order: Limida
- Superfamily: Limoidea
- Family: Limidae
- Genus: Acesta; H. Adams & A. Adams, 1858

Synonyms
- Acesta (Acesta) H. Adams & A. Adams, 1858 · alternate representation; Acesta (Callolima) Bartsch, 1913 · alternate representation; Acesta (Plicacesta) H. E. Vokes, 1963 · alternate representation; Lima (Acesta) H. Adams & A. Adams, 1858; Lima (Callolima) Bartsch, 1913 (original rank); Lima (Plicacesta) H. E. Vokes, 1963; Plicacesta H. E. Vokes, 1963; Radula (Acesta) H. Adams & A. Adams, 1858 (original rank)

= Acesta =

Genus of bivalves

Acesta is a genus of marine bivalve molluscs in the family Limidae.

== Species ==
The World Register of Marine Species registers 29 species.

- Acesta agassizii (Dall, 1902)
- Acesta angolensis (Adam & Knudsen, 1955)
- Acesta arnaudi (Nolf, 2022)
- † Acesta backae Stilwell & Mckenzie, 1999
- † Acesta bibbyi Stilwell & Zinsmeister, 1992
- Acesta borneensis (Bartsch, 1913)
- † Acesta brycei Marwick, 1953
- Acesta bullisi (H. E. Vokes, 1963)
- Acesta celebensis (Bartsch, 1913)
- Acesta citrina (Masahito & Habe, 1976)
- Acesta colombiana (H. E. Vokes, 1970)
- Acesta cryptadelphe (Gagnon, Kenchington, Port, Anstey & Murillo, 2015)
- † Acesta dilatata (Lamarck, 1806)
- Acesta diomedae (Dall, 1908)
- Acesta excavata (Fabricius, 1779)
- Acesta gabrieli (Nolf, 2022)
- Acesta goliath (G. B. Sowerby III, 1883)
- † Acesta imitata (Suter, 1917)
- Acesta indica (E. A. Smith, 1899)
- † Acesta laticosta Stilwell & Gaździcki, 1998
- Acesta lemuriensis (Nolf & Hubrecht, 2022)
- † Acesta laticosta Stilwell & Gaździcki, 1998
- Acesta marissinica (Yamashita & Habe, 1969)
- † Acesta marlburiensis (H. Woods, 1917)
- Acesta maui (B. A. Marshall), 2001
- Acesta mori (Hertlein, 1952)
- Acesta niasensis (Thiele, 1918)
- Acesta oophaga (Järnegren & C. M. Young, 2007)
- Acesta patagonica (Dall, 1902)
- Acesta philippinensis (Bartsch, 1913)
- Acesta rathbuni (Bartsch, 1913)
- † Acesta regia (Suter, 1917)
- Acesta saginata (B. A. Marshall, 2001)
- † Acesta shackletoni Zinsmeister & Macellari, 1988
- Acesta smithi (G. B. Sowerby III, 1888)
- † Acesta snowhillensis (Wilckens, 1910)
- Acesta sphoni (Hertlein, 1963)
- Acesta verdensis (Bartsch, 1913)
- Acesta virgo (Habe & Okutani, 1968)
- † Acesta webbi Zinsmeister & Macellari, 1988

== Synonyms ==
- Acesta butonensis (Bartsch, 1913): synonym of Acesta verdensis (Bartsch, 1913) (junior subjective synonym)
- Acesta iwaotakii Habe, 1961: synonym of Divarilima iwaotakii (Habe, 1961)
- Acesta kronenbergi Thach, 2015: synonym of Acesta marissinica Yamashita & Habe, 1969 (junior subjective synonym)
- Acesta vitrina (Poppe, Tagaro & Stahlschmidt, 2015): synonym of Acestarica vitrina (Poppe, Tagaro & Stahlschmidt, 2015) (superseded combination)
