= Divarilima pellucida =

Scientific classification
- Kingdom: Animalia
- Phylum: Mollusca
- Class: Bivalvia
- Order: Limida
- Family: Limidae
- Genus: Divarilima
- Species: D. pellucida

Binomial name
- Divarilima pellucida

Species of bivalve

Divarilima pellucida is a species of saltwater clam, a marine bivalve mollusc in the family Limidae. Divarilima pellucida has only been found in the waters of New Zealand.
