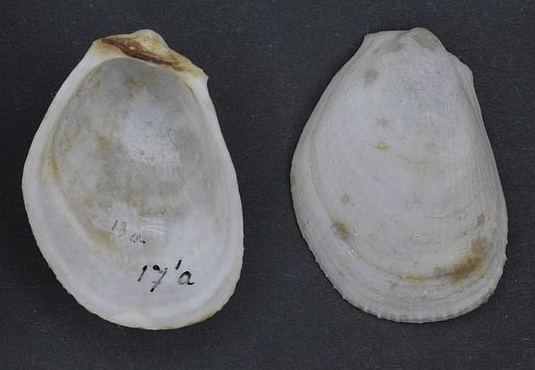

Scientific classification
- Domain: Eukaryota
- Kingdom: Animalia
- Phylum: Mollusca
- Class: Bivalvia
- Order: Limida
- Family: Limidae
- Genus: Limaria
- Species: L. tuberculata

Binomial name
- Limaria tuberculata (Olivi, 1792)

= Limaria tuberculata =

Species of bivalve

Limaria tuberculata is a species of bivalves belonging to the family Limidae.

The species has almost cosmopolitan distribution.
