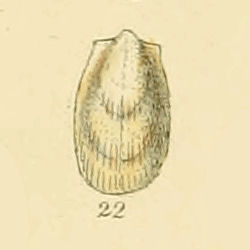

Scientific classification
- Kingdom: Animalia
- Phylum: Mollusca
- Class: Bivalvia
- Order: Limida
- Superfamily: Limoidea
- Family: Limidae
- Genus: Limatula; Searles-Wood, 1839

Type species
- Pecten subauriculatus Montagu, 1808

Species
- See text

Synonyms
- Antarctolima Habe, 1977; Gemellima Iredale, 1929; Lima (Limatula) S. V. Wood, 1839; Limatula (Antarctolima) Habe, 1977 accepted, alternate representation; Limatula (Limatula) S. V. Wood, 1839 accepted, alternate representation; Limatula (Limatuletta) C. A. Fleming, 1978 accepted, alternate representation; Limatula (Squamilima) C. A. Fleming, 1978; Limatula (Stabilima) Iredale, 1939 accepted, alternate representation; Limatuletta C. A. Fleming, 1978; Radula (Limatula) S. V. Wood, 1839; Squamilima C. A. Fleming, 1978 (objective synonym); Stabilima Iredale, 1939

= Limatula =

Genus of bivalves

Limatula, the file shells or file clams, is a genus of marine bivalve molluscs in the family Limidae.

== Species ==
- Limatula attenuata Dall, 1916 - attenuate fileclam
- Limatula aupouria Powell, 1937
- Limatula confusa (E. A. Smith, 1885) - confusing fileclam
- Limatula gwyni (Sykes, 1903)
- Limatula hendersoni Olsson and McGinty, 1958 - henderson fileclam, minute fileclam
- Limatula hodgsoni (E. A. Smith, 1907)
- Limatula hyalina A. E. Verrill and Bush, 1898 - ahyaline fileclam, hyaline fileclam
- Limatula hyperborea A. S. Jensen, 1909 - Arctic fileclam, boreal fileclam
- Limatula japonica A. Adams, 1864 - Japan fileclam
- Limatula maoria Finlay, 1927
- Limatula regularis A. E. Verrill and Bush, 1898 - aregular fileclam, regular fileclam
- Limatula saturna Bernard, 1978 - Saturna fileclam, saturnine fileclam
- Limatula setifera Dall, 1886 - bristly fileclam
- Limatula similaris (Dall, 1908) - furrowless fileclam
- Limatula subauriculata (Montagu, 1808) - small-ear fileclam
- Limatula subovata (Jeffreys, 1876)
- Limatula sulcata (Brown, 1827)
- Limatula suteri Dall, 1908
- Limatula vancouverensis Bernard, 1978 - Vancouver fileclam

Species brought into synonymy

- Limatula pygmaea (Philippi, 1845): synonym of Limea pygmaea (Philippi, 1845)
