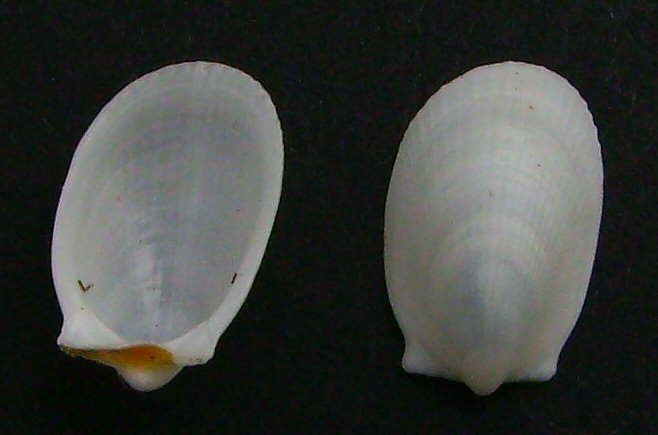

Scientific classification
- Kingdom: Animalia
- Phylum: Mollusca
- Class: Bivalvia
- Order: Limida
- Family: Limidae
- Genus: Limatula
- Species: L. maoria

Binomial name
- Limatula maoria Finlay, 1927

= Limatula maoria =

Species of bivalve

Limatula maoria is a species of bivalve mollusc in the family Limidae.
