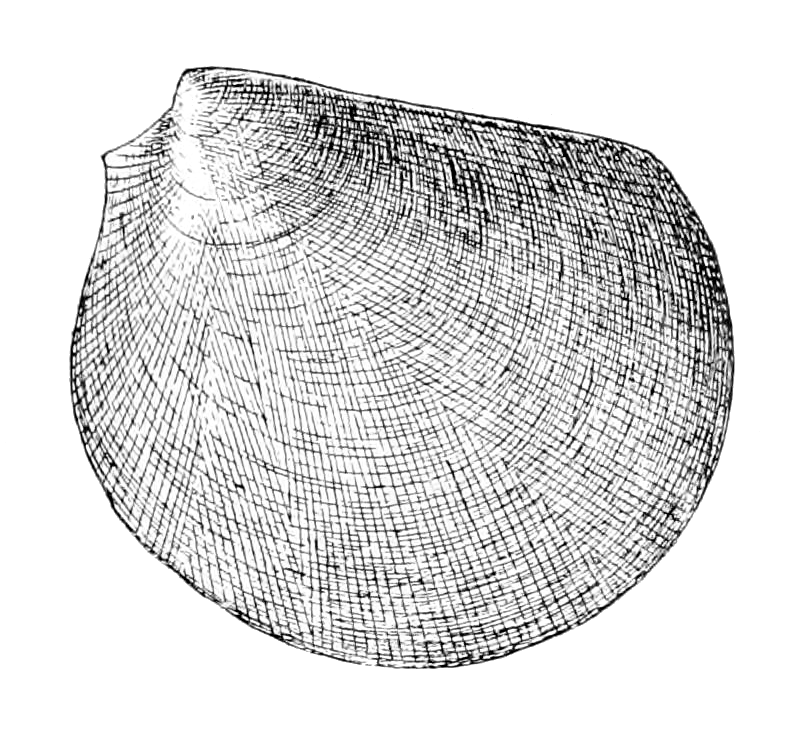

Scientific classification
- Kingdom: Animalia
- Phylum: Mollusca
- Class: Bivalvia
- Order: Limida
- Family: Limidae
- Genus: Divarilima
- Species: D. albicoma

Binomial name
- Divarilima albicoma (Dall, 1886)

= Divarilima albicoma =

Species of mollusc

Divarilima albicoma is a bivalve that lives in the Florida Keys. The creature is found at a depth of 100–200 m (330–660 ft) deep. Its size has been known to get up to 11 mm (0.43 in), but is usually about 8 mm (0.31 in).
