= Limatula aupouria =

Scientific classification
- Kingdom: Animalia
- Phylum: Mollusca
- Class: Bivalvia
- Order: Limida
- Family: Limidae
- Genus: Limatula
- Species: L. aupouria

Binomial name
- Limatula aupouria Powell, 1937

Species of bivalve

Limatula aupouria is a species of bivalve mollusc in the family Limidae, the file shells or file clams.
