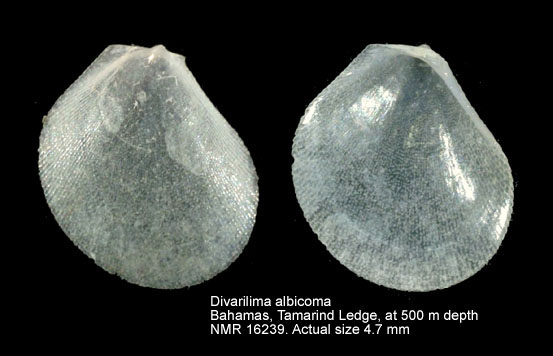
- Divarilima albicoma

Scientific classification
- Kingdom: Animalia
- Phylum: Mollusca
- Class: Bivalvia
- Order: Limida
- Superfamily: Limoidea
- Family: Limidae
- Genus: Divarilima; Powell, 1958

Type species
- Lima sydneyensis

= Divarilima =

Genus of bivalves

Divarilima is a genus of marine bivalve molluscs in the family Limidae, the file shells or file clams.

== Description ==
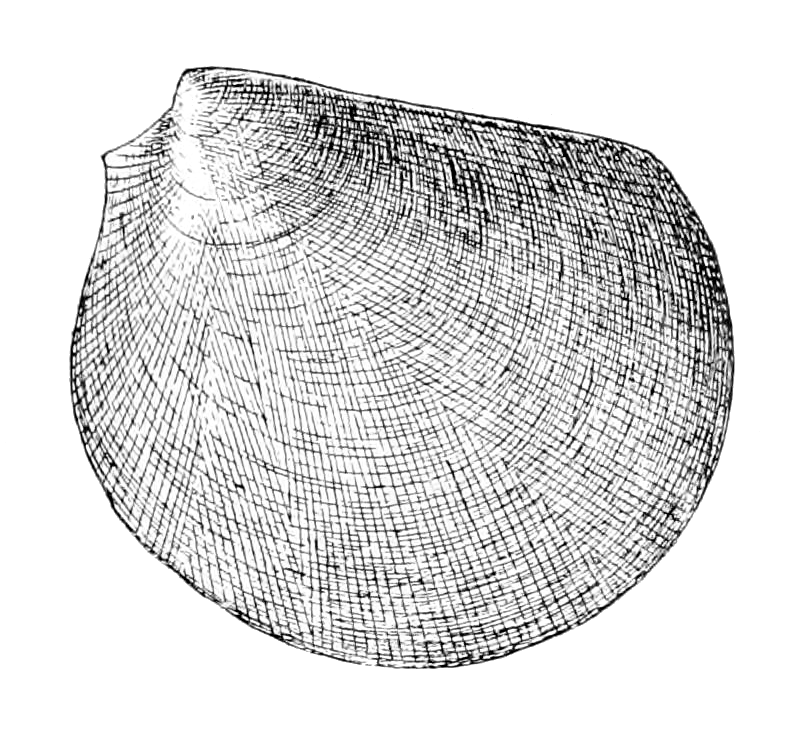
Illustration of D. albicoma by William Healey Dall (1902)

In the original description, Powell described the genus as below:

It is a miniature Lima with a Ctenoides sculptural pattern of divaricating threads. It resembles the typical species except that a mature stage of arrested growth is reached at a small size, corresponding with the early post-larval stages in Lima typical.

Members of the genus are small, trigonally ovate, strongly inequilateral, and have sharp. backward-pointing umbones. The anterodorsal outline almost straight, extended, coinciding with well-marked a umbonal ridge which borders a concave lunule.

== Taxonomy ==
The genus was first described by A. W. B. Powell in 1958, who named Lima sydneyensis as the type species of the genus. The genus is in the family Limidae.

== Distribution ==
Divarilima is found in oceans across the globe, including waters near Japan, the western Atlantic, South Africa, Australia and New Zealand.

== Species ==
Species within the genus Divarilima include:

- Divarilima abscisa (Barnard, 1964)
- Divarilima albicoma (Dall, 1886)
- † Divarilima aucklandensis (Laws, 1950)
- Divarilima elegans Hayami & Kase, 1993
- Divarilima handini J. Gibson-Smith & W. Gibson-Smith, 1982
- Divarilima iwaotakii (T. Habe, 1961)
- Divarilima sydneyensis (Hedley, 1904)
