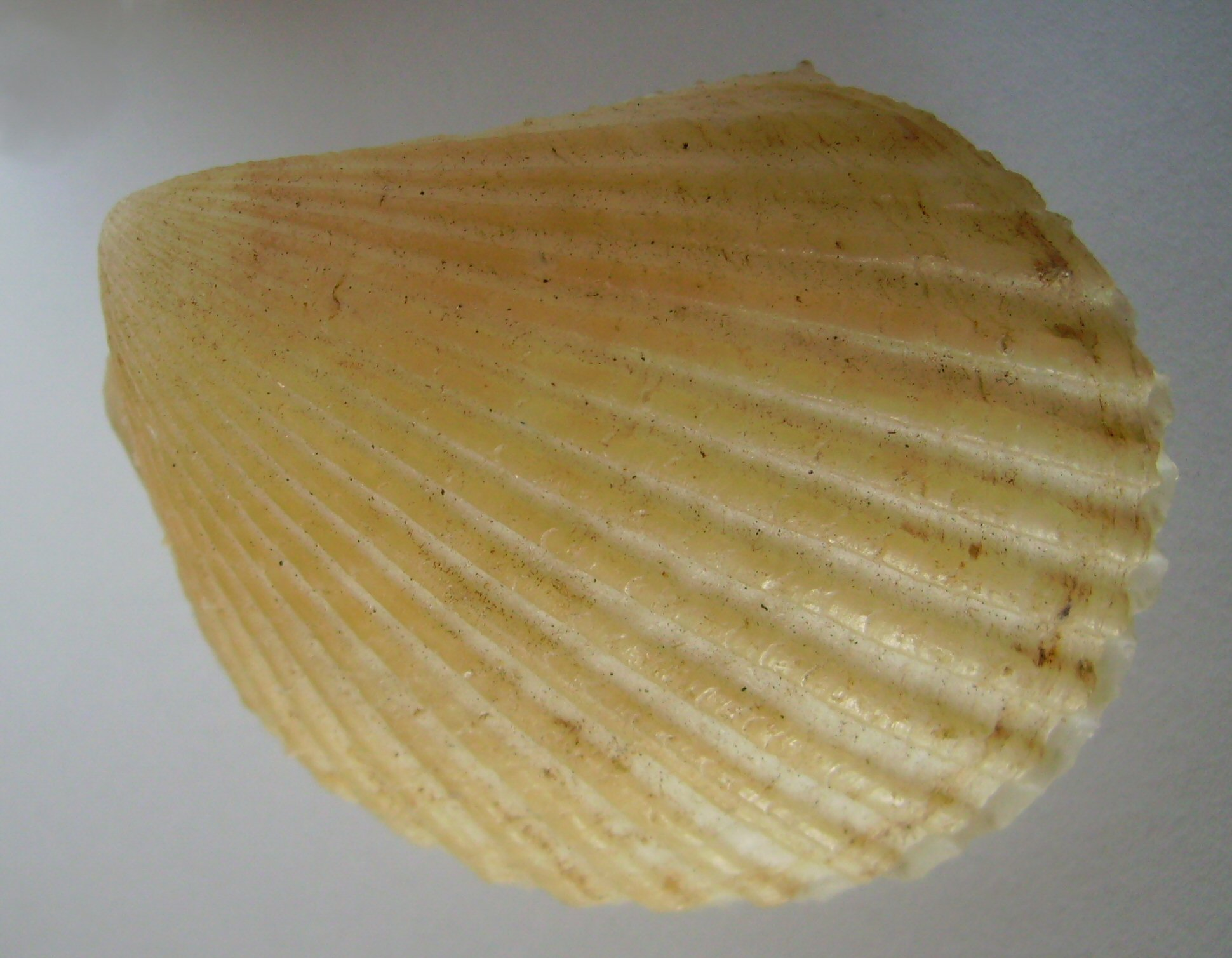

Scientific classification
- Kingdom: Animalia
- Phylum: Mollusca
- Class: Bivalvia
- Order: Limida
- Superfamily: Limoidea
- Family: Limidae
- Genus: Lima
- Species: L. zealandica

Binomial name
- Lima zealandica G.B. Sowerby III, 1877

Synonyms
- Lima colorata zealandica G. B. Sowerby III, 1877; † Lima mestayerae Marwick, 1924; Lima neozelanica [sic] Hutton, 1884 (misspelling)

= Lima zealandica =

Subspecies of bivalve

Lima zealandica is a species of bivalve mollusc in the family Limidae.

== Distribution ==
This species is endemic to New Zealand.

== EDxternal links ==
- Sowerby, G. B., III. (1877). Descriptions of six new species of shells from the collections of the Marchioness Paulucci and Dr. Prevost. Proceedings of the Zoological Society of London. 1876: 752-755, pl. 75.
