= Escalima regularis =

Scientific classification
- Kingdom: Animalia
- Phylum: Mollusca
- Class: Bivalvia
- Order: Limida
- Family: Limidae
- Genus: Escalima
- Species: E. regularis

Binomial name
- Escalima regularis Powell, 1955

Synonyms
- Lima angulata Suter, 1913; Lima (Mantellum) murrayi Powell, 1926

Species of bivalve

Escalima regularis is a species of bivalve mollusc in the family Limidae, the file shells or file clams.
