= Divarilima sydneyensis =

Scientific classification
- Kingdom: Animalia
- Phylum: Mollusca
- Class: Bivalvia
- Order: Limida
- Family: Limidae
- Genus: Divarilima
- Species: D. sydneyensis

Binomial name
- Divarilima sydneyensis (Hedley, 1904)

Species of bivalve

Divarilima sydneyensis is a species of bivalve mollusc in the family Limidae, the file shells or file clams. It is the type species of its genus.
