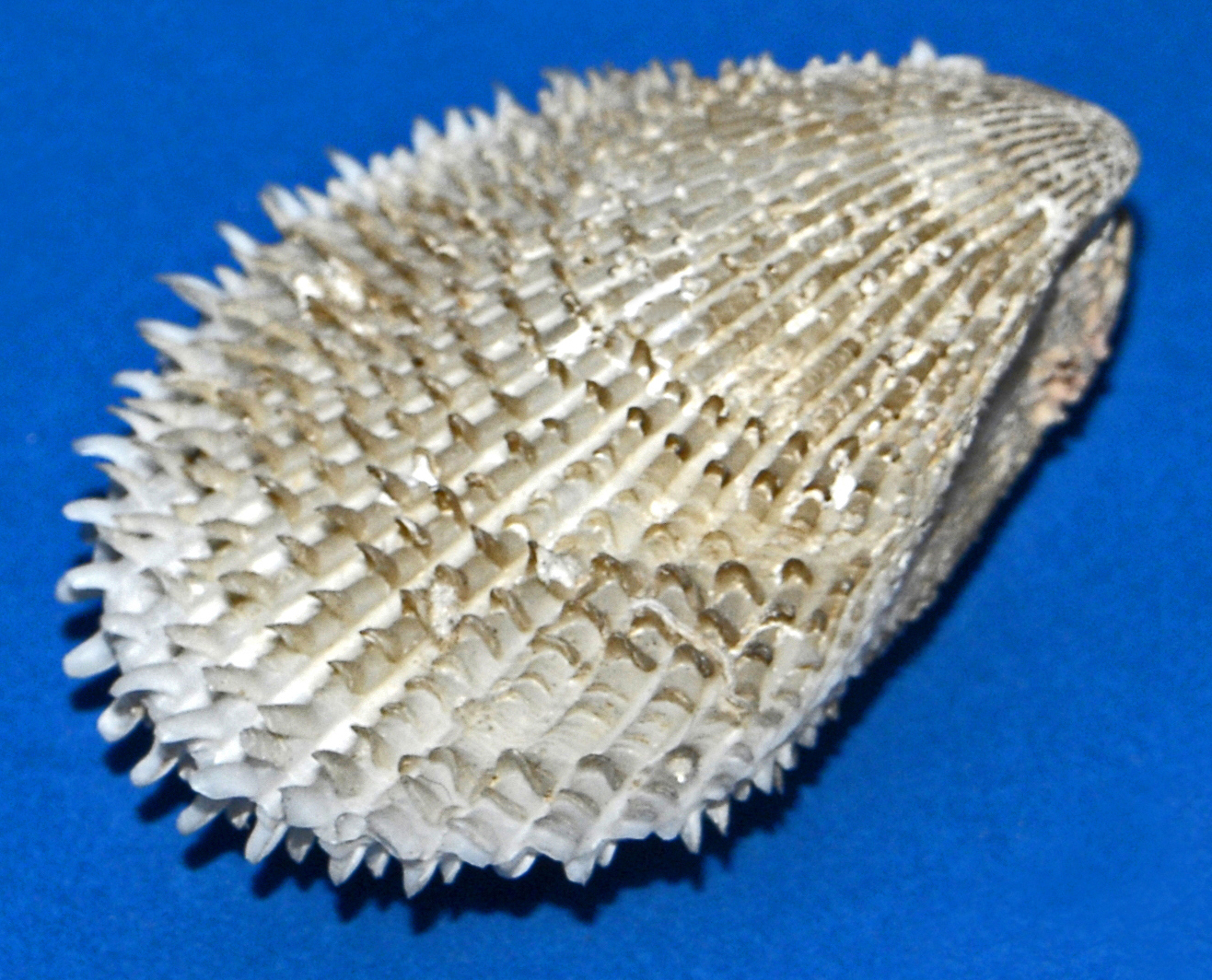
- Lama lima from Sicily on display at the Museo Civico di Storia Naturale di Milano

Scientific classification
- Kingdom: Animalia
- Phylum: Mollusca
- Class: Bivalvia
- Order: Limida
- Family: Limidae
- Genus: Lima
- Species: L. lima

Binomial name
- Lima lima (Linnaeus, 1758)

Synonyms
- Lima alba Cuvier, 1797; Lima squamosa Lamarck, 1801; Lima vulgaris Scacchi, 1836; Ostrea lima Linnaeus, 1758

= Lima lima =

Species of bivalve

Lima lima, or the spiny fileclam, is a species of bivalve mollusc in the family Limidae.

== Description ==
The shell of an adult Lima lima can be as long as 30–79 millimetres (1.2–3.1 in). The surface of the valves show 18–24 strong ribs covered with small scales. These clams are filter feeders.

Right and left valve of the same specimen:

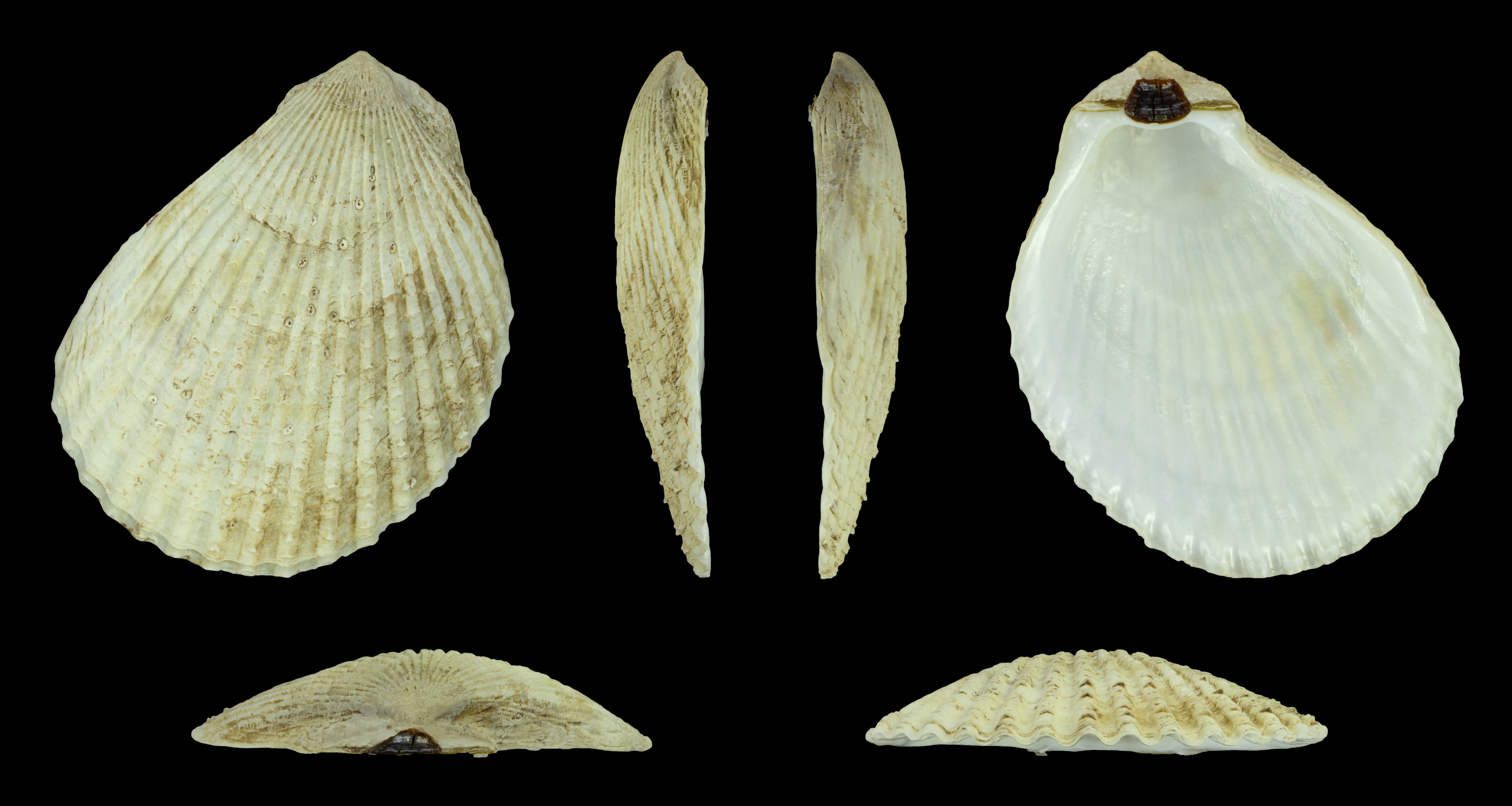
Right valve

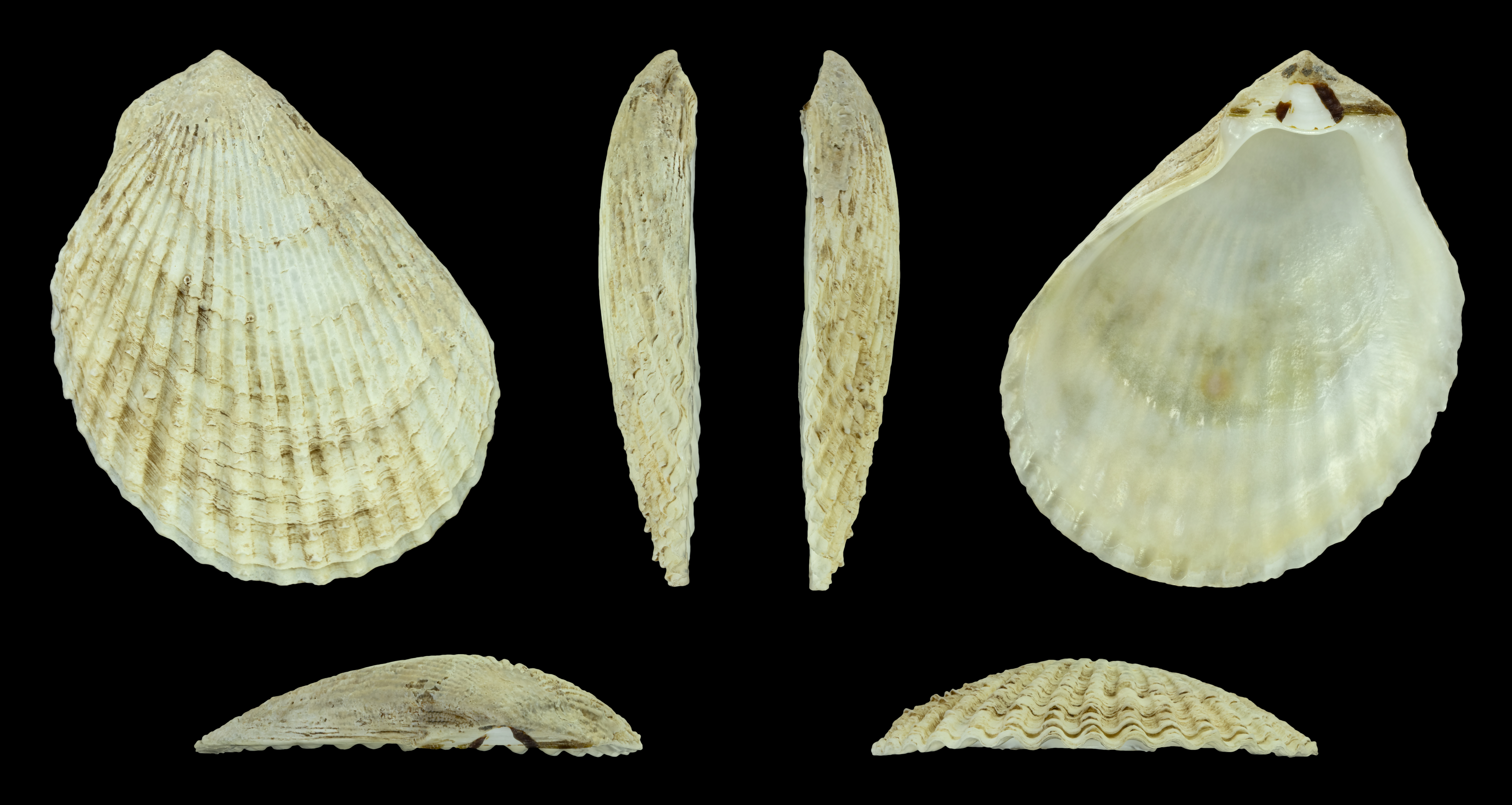
Left valve

Juvenile

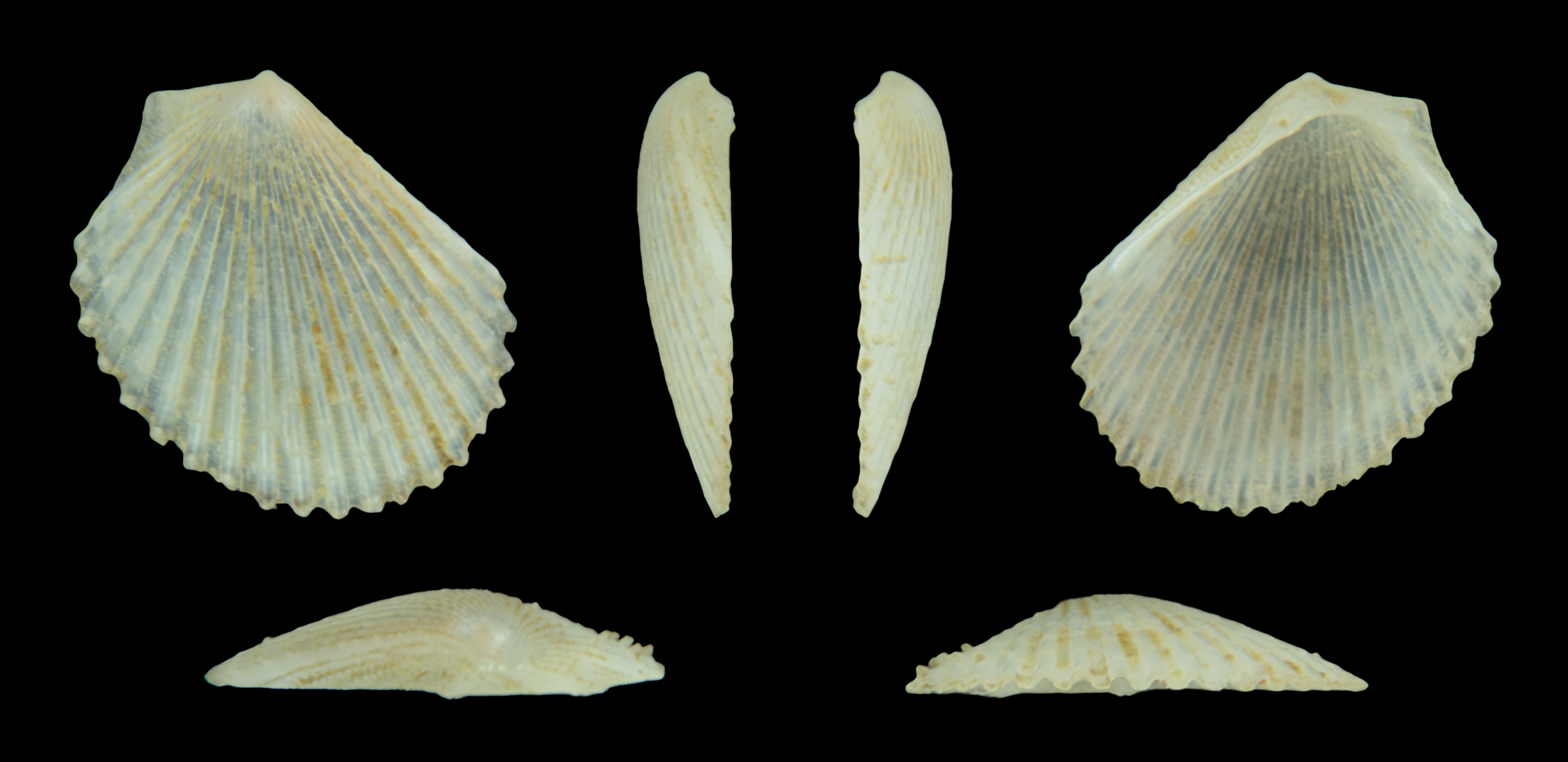
Left valve

== Distribution and habitat ==
This species can be found in the Mediterranean Sea, in the Eastern Atlantic and in Caribbean waters, ranging from southern Florida to the West Indies and Bermuda. It lives on rocky bottoms and coral, usually in the seagrass prairies of Posidonia oceanica, at depths of 0 to 50-metre (160 ft).
