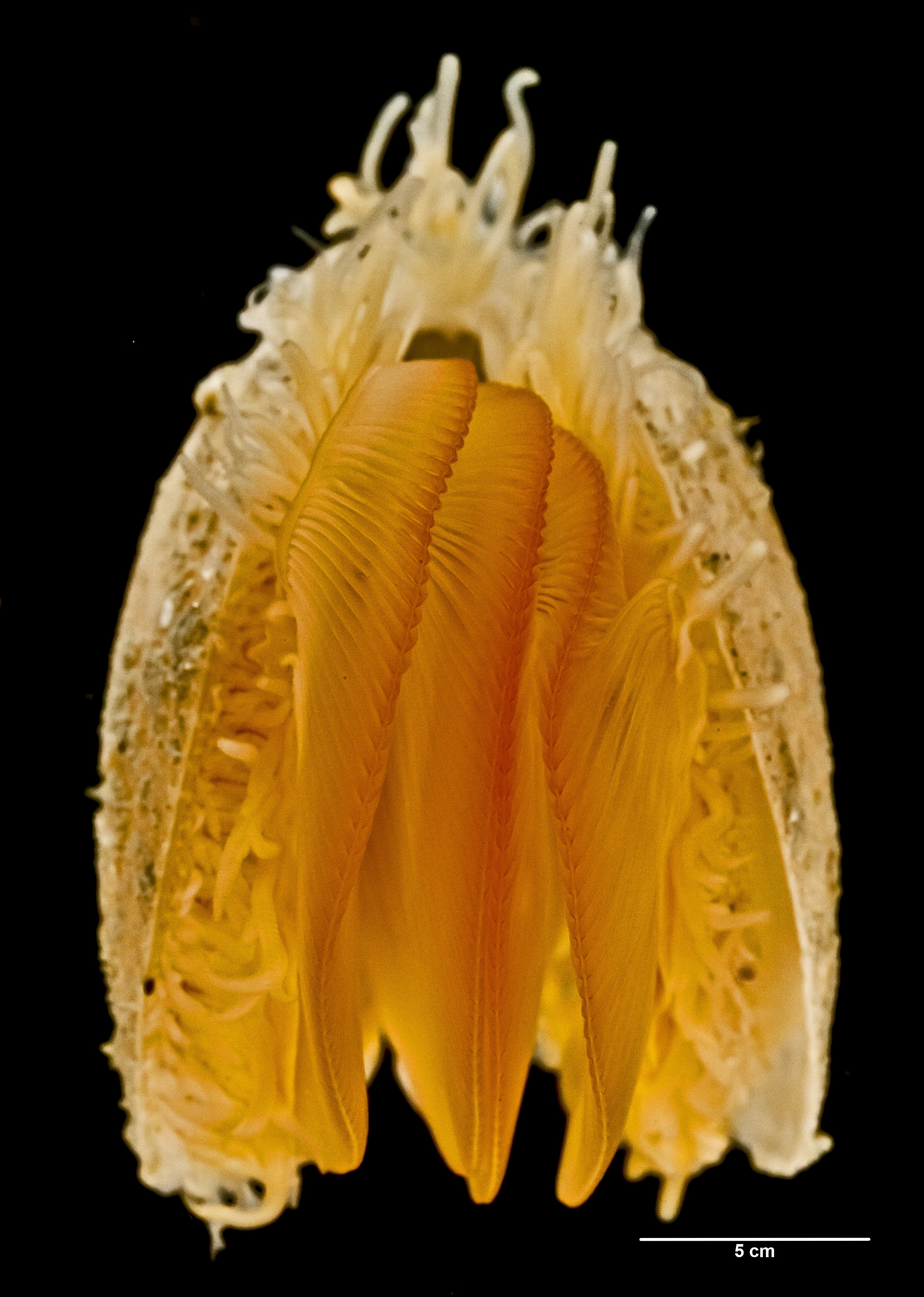

Scientific classification
- Kingdom: Animalia
- Phylum: Mollusca
- Class: Bivalvia
- Order: Limida
- Family: Limidae
- Genus: Limaria
- Species: L. orientalis

Binomial name
- Limaria orientalis (Adams and Reeve, 1850)

= Limaria orientalis =

Species of bivalve

Limaria orientalis has the common name, file shell. It is a bivalve mollusc of the family Limidae (the file shells). It is present in New Zealand.
