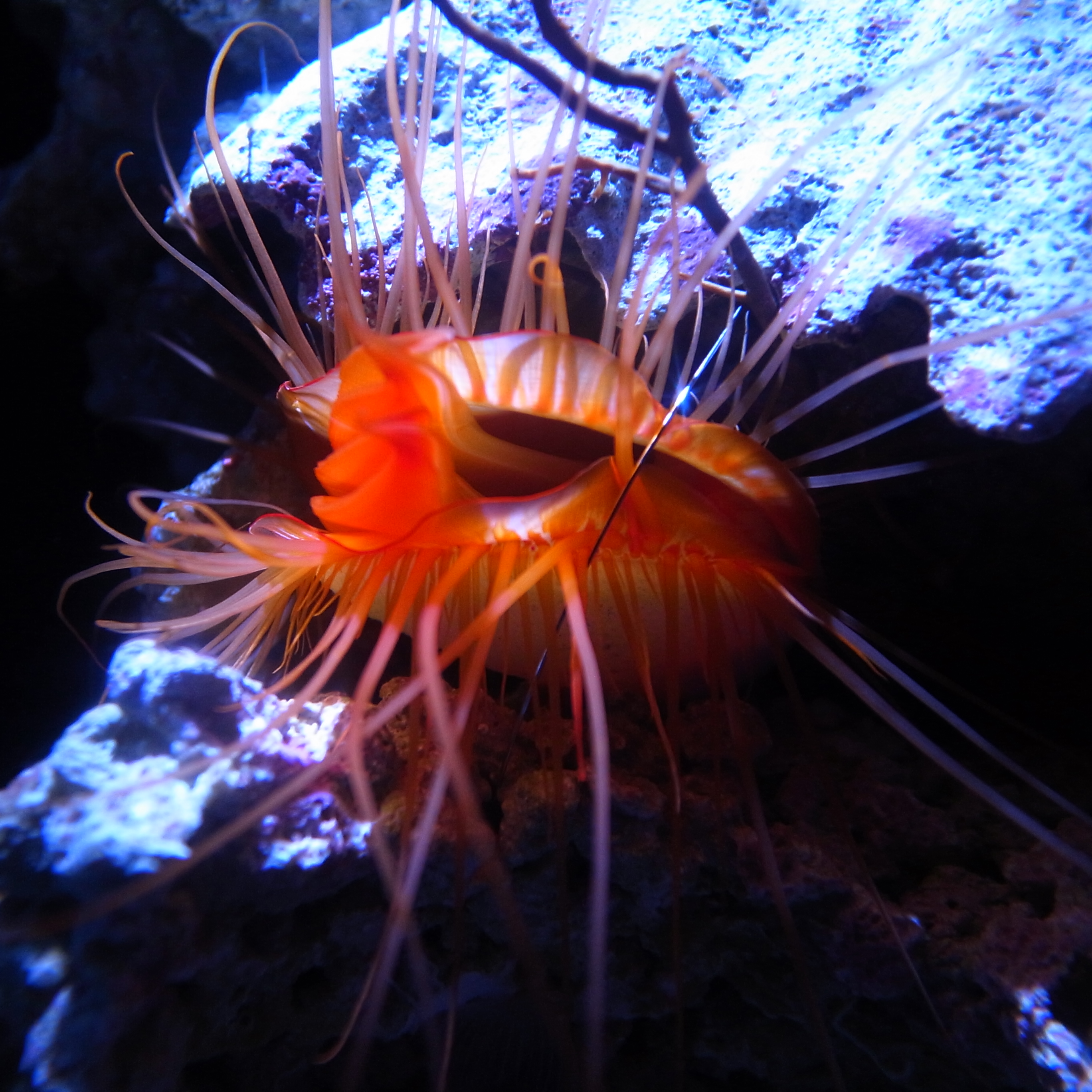

Scientific classification
- Kingdom: Animalia
- Phylum: Mollusca
- Class: Bivalvia
- Order: Limida
- Family: Limidae
- Genus: Ctenoides
- Species: C. ales

Binomial name
- Ctenoides ales (Finlay, 1927)

Synonyms
- Lima alata Hedley, 1898 – preoccupied by Lima alata Roemer, 1836; Lima ales Finlay, 1927

= Ctenoides ales =

Species of bivalve

Ctenoides ales is a species of saltwater clam, a marine bivalve mollusk in the family Limidae, the file clams. It is known by the names electric flame scallop, disco scallop, electric clam and disco clam. The clam has been given these nicknames because its soft tissues flash light like a disco ball. Along with Ctenoides scaber, they are among the only bivalves known to have light displays.

The electric clam is widespread throughout the tropical waters of the central Indo-Pacific region from Indonesia to Palau Islands and New-Caledonia.

Four Electric Flame Scallops in an aquarium

Research by graduate student Lindsey Dougherty showed that the apparent flashing-light display of this clam is not a bioluminescence phenomenon, but is instead coming from reflection of the ambient light (sun or diving light). A staff member of the Lembeh Resort in Indonesia, where Dougherty was working with Dimpy Jacobs in August 2013, wrote, "The clams have a highly reflective tissue on the very outer edge of their mantle that is exposed and then hidden very quickly, so the change back and forth from the white reflective tissue to the red tissue creates the appearance of flashing".

Dougherty went on to discover that the brightly reflective edge of the mantle of these clams contains nanospheres made of silica, which are very reflective.

In 2016, Dougherty published another study of C. ales that suggested the flashing behavior was most likely developed for the purpose of predator deterrence.
