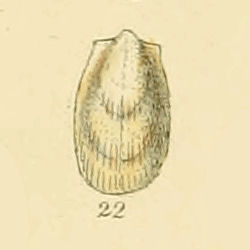

Scientific classification
- Kingdom: Animalia
- Phylum: Mollusca
- Class: Bivalvia
- Order: Limida
- Family: Limidae
- Genus: Limatula
- Species: L. subauriculata

Binomial name
- Limatula subauriculata (Montagu, 1808)

= Limatula subauriculata =

Species of bivalve

Limatula subauriculata, the small-eared file shell, is a species of bivalve mollusc in the family Limidae. It can be found along the Atlantic coast of North America, ranging from Greenland to the West Indies.
