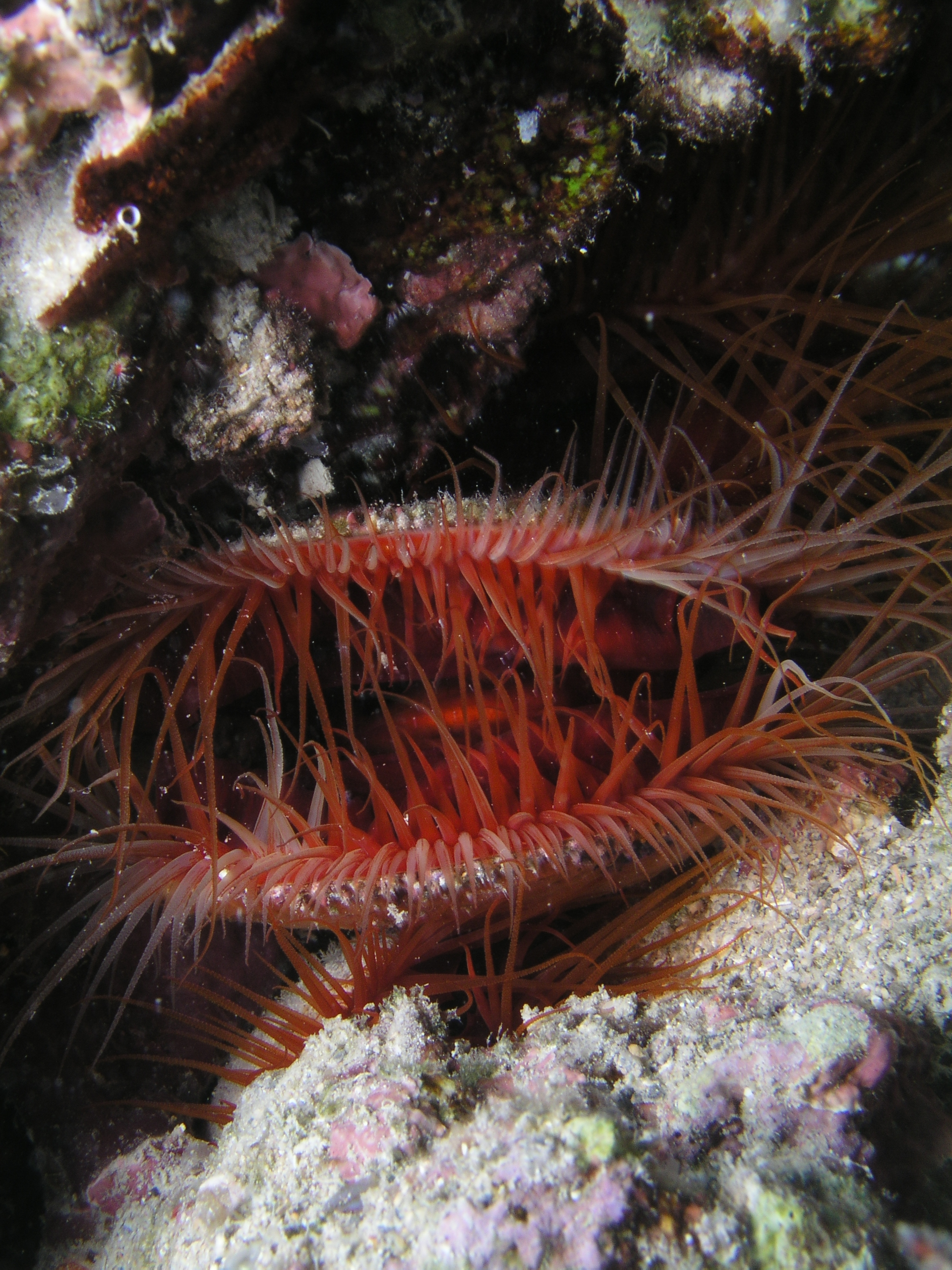

Scientific classification
- Kingdom: Animalia
- Phylum: Mollusca
- Class: Bivalvia
- Order: Limida
- Family: Limidae
- Genus: Ctenoides
- Species: C. scaber

Binomial name
- Ctenoides scaber (Born, 1778)

Synonyms
- Ctenoides scabra [sic]; Lima aspera Thiele, 1918; Lima glacialis (Gmelin, 1791); Lima scabra (Born, 1778); Ostrea glacialis Gmelin, 1791; Ostrea sagrinata Bruguière, 1790; Ostrea scabra Born, 1778

= Ctenoides scaber =

Flame scallop

Species of bivalve

Ctenoides scaber, the flame scallop or rough fileclam, is a species of saltwater clam, a marine bivalve mollusc in the family Limidae. Despite their common name, flame scallops are not closely related to true scallops.

This species is found in the Caribbean Sea. It is similar in appearance to the Indo-Pacific electric flame scallop (Ctenoides ales).

== Description ==
Flame scallops have a rough shell and a red mantle. At the edge of the mantle are red and white tentacles. The flame scallop's vibrant red color is due to the large amount of carotenoids found within their body. Flame scallops can reach 3 inches in length. As is the case in almost all bivalves, the gills in this species are used both for respiration and filtration.

== Habitat and diet ==
Flame scallops rest in their own "nests", which are made of small coral pieces and rocks. Flame scallops are herbivorous, eating only phytoplankton. During the consumption process, flame scallops sift and sort through the phytoplankton with their palps to determine what is appropriate for ingestion.

== Predators ==
To escape predators such as crabs and shrimp, the flame scallop's valves are utilized in fast locomotion, clapping their valves together to propel themselves away.
