= Limatula suteri =

Limatula suteri Temporal range: Pliocene to Recent

Scientific classification
- Kingdom: Animalia
- Phylum: Mollusca
- Class: Bivalvia
- Order: Limida
- Family: Limidae
- Genus: Limatula
- Species: L. suteri

Binomial name
- Limatula suteri Dall, 1908

Species of bivalve

Limatula suteri is a species of bivalve mollusc in the family Limidae, the file shells or file clams.
