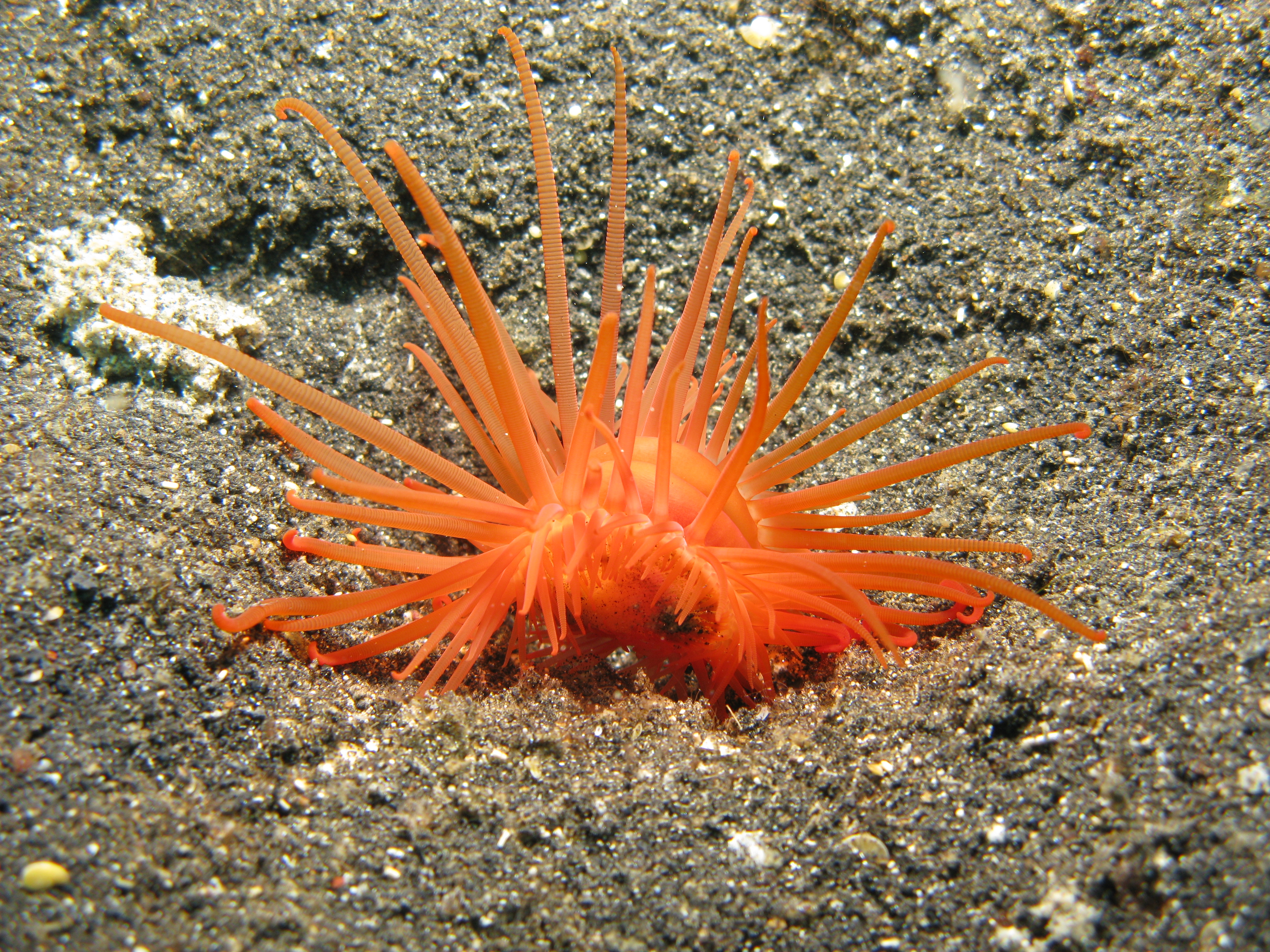

Scientific classification
- Kingdom: Animalia
- Phylum: Mollusca
- Class: Bivalvia
- Order: Limida
- Family: Limidae
- Genus: Limaria
- Species: L. fragilis

Binomial name
- Limaria fragilis (Gmelin, 1791)

Synonyms
- Lima fragilis (Gmelin, 1791); Ostrea fragilis Gmelin, 1791

= Limaria fragilis =

Species of bivalve

Limaria fragilis, the fragile file clam, is a species of bivalve mollusc in the family Limidae. It is found in shallow waters in the Indian and Pacific Oceans and has the ability to swim.

== Description ==
The fragile file clam has a pair of hinged, thin, asymmetric white valves and a red mantle with a fringe of long tapering pink and grey banded tentacles at its edge. Also around the margin of the mantle are a row of tiny eyespots that can detect light and shade, and may alert the animal to the approach of a predator.

== Distribution and habitat ==
The fragile file clam is widely distributed in the Indo-Pacific region. Its range includes the Philippines, the Marshall Islands, the Cook Islands, Western Australia, the Chagos Archipelago, Madagascar and the Red Sea. It often conceals itself in crevices or under stones with just its tentacles protruding.

== Biology ==
The fragile file clam is a protandrous hermaphrodite. Juveniles start life as males and change sex to females as they grow. Fragile file clams have the ability to emit flashes of bioluminescent light, though why they do this is unclear.

The fragile file clam can swim slowly and continuously for about 5 minutes at a time. It does this by opening and closing its valves and expelling water in a stream from either side of the hinge, a form of jet propulsion. In an aquarium, the animal flits around knocking into other objects. It uses its mantle tentacles in an oar-like fashion when swimming. Sometimes it sheds the longest tentacles and can still swim effectively without them, increasing the frequency of valve clapping to maintain speed. The detached tentacles secrete a noxious substance and continue to writhe after they are severed which may distract aggressors.

It was originally thought that the energy for swimming was supplied aerobically through respiration with little input from anaerobic glycolysis and arginine phosphate. Further study showed that this was not the case. There was a high level of arginine kinase and certain other enzymes in the adductor muscles which was indicative of the conversion of arginine phosphate for energy production. Up to 23% of the ATP used for energy transfer was supplied in this way while the animal was swimming.
