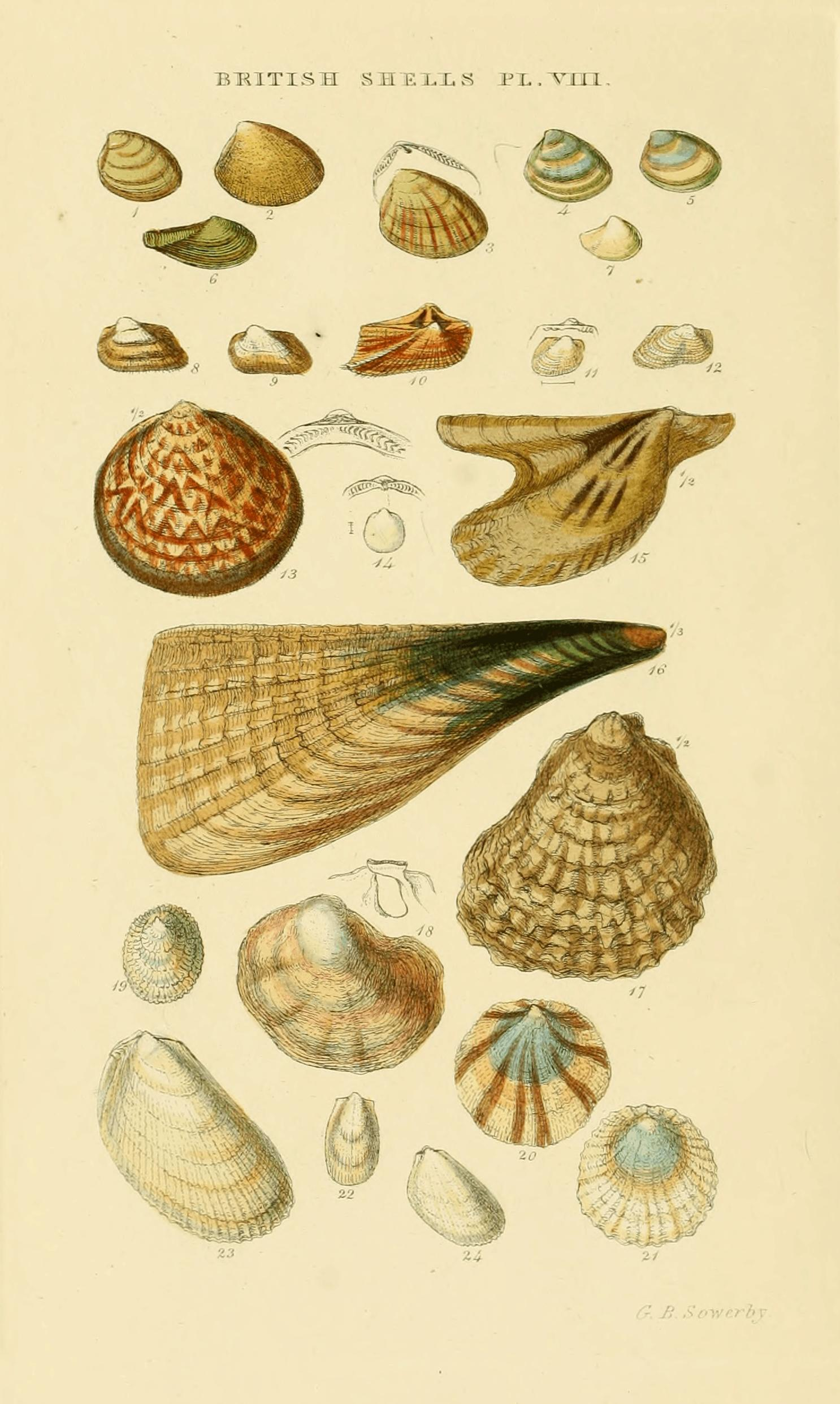

Conservation status
- Secure (NatureServe)

Scientific classification
- Kingdom: Animalia
- Phylum: Mollusca
- Class: Bivalvia
- Order: Limida
- Superfamily: Limoidea
- Family: Limidae
- Genus: Limaria
- Species: L. pellucida

Binomial name
- Limaria pellucida (C.B. Adams, 1846)

Synonyms
- Lima pellucida C. B. Adams, 1848

= Limaria pellucida =

Species of bivalve

Limaria pellucida, the Antillean file shell, is a species of bivalve mollusc in the family Limidae. It can be found along the Atlantic coast of North America, ranging from North Carolina to the West Indies.
