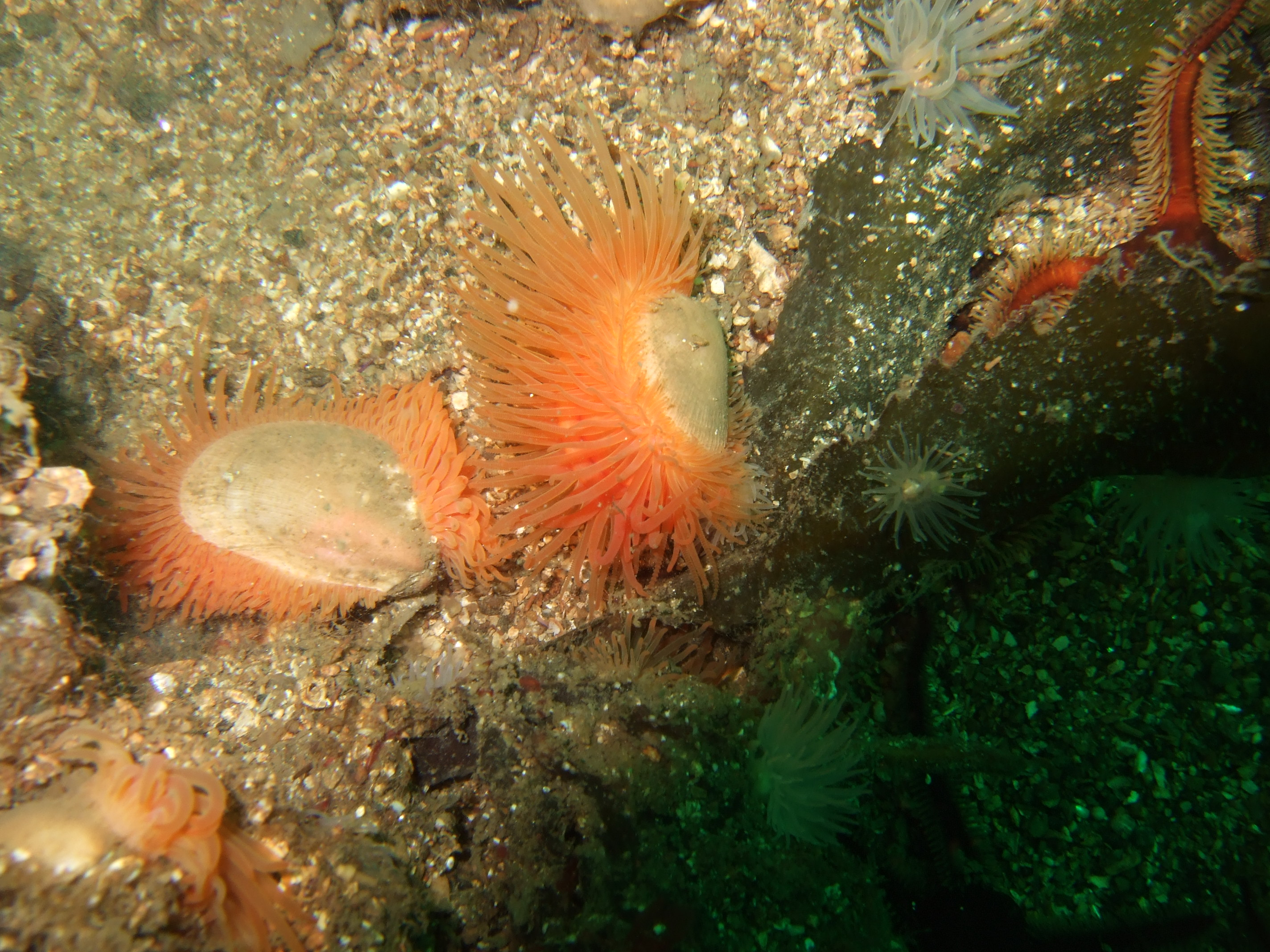
- Two flame shells which have been torn from their protective nest at the bottom of Loch Carron in Scotland

Scientific classification
- Kingdom: Animalia
- Phylum: Mollusca
- Class: Bivalvia
- Order: Limida
- Family: Limidae
- Genus: Limaria
- Species: L. hians

Binomial name
- Limaria hians (Gmelin, 1791)

Synonyms
- List: Lima aperta G. B. Sowerby II, 1843; Lima dehiscens Conrad, 1837; Lima hians (Gmelin, 1791); Lima laevigata Risso, 1826; Lima levigata Risso, 1826; Lima oblonga S. V. Wood, 1839; Lima tenera W. Turton, 1825; Lima tenuis Leach, 1852; Lima vitrina T. Brown, 1827; Mantellum hians (Gmelin, 1791); Mantellum hians var. mediterranea Monterosato, 1884; Ostrea glaciata Salis Marschlins, 1793; Ostrea hians Gmelin, 1791; Radula hians (Gmelin, 1791); Radula hians var. transiens Cerulli-Irelli, 1907

= Limaria hians =

Species of marine clam in the family Limidae from the northeastern Atlantic

Limaria hians, the flame shell, is a species of small saltwater clam, a marine bivalve mollusc in the family Limidae. This species is native to the northeastern Atlantic Ocean.

== Biology ==
The flame shell resembles a scallop with a bright orange fringe of tentacle-like filaments emerging from between the valve of its shell.

These bivalves create nests through the use of byssal threads to bind small stones, shells and other detritus together, enclosing themselves as form of protection. Individual nests expand over time, eventually overlapping with other nests and consequently forming expansive reefs. Holes in the reef allow fresh seawater to flow through, preventing stagnation. These reefs support a diverse marine ecosystem with one study showing six nest complexes supporting 19 species of algae and 265 species of invertebrates.

== Distribution ==
This species is found in the northeast Atlantic, ranging from Lofoten to the Canary Islands, including the Mediterranean Sea. In the British Isles, the distribution of this species is primarily in the west coast of Scotland from the sublittoral (below low tide), down to 100m, although there are patchy records of the species being found in more southerly regions of the United Kingdom. There are a number of well-known colonies on the sea bed in Loch Carron, below Strome Castle. In 2012 a bed of 100 million flame shells covering an area of 75 hectares was found during a survey of Loch Alsh undertaken by Heriot-Watt University on behalf of Marine Scotland. Richard Lochhead, Cabinet Secretary for Rural Affairs and the Environment said: "The flame shell must be considered among the most remarkable species in our waters, with a dazzling array of orange tentacles. Many would place such an exotic species in far-flung tropical reefs - not realising they dwell under the waves just off the coast of Skye. This important discovery may be the largest grouping of flame shells anywhere in the world."
