= Escalima =

Scientific classification
- Kingdom: Animalia
- Phylum: Mollusca
- Class: Bivalvia
- Order: Limida
- Family: Limidae
- Genus: Escalima; Iredale, 1929

Species
- See text

Genus of bivalves

Escalima is a genus of marine bivalve molluscs in the family Limidae, the file shells or file clams.

== Species ==
- Escalima goughensis (Melvill & Standen, 1907)
- Escalima regularis Powell, 1955
