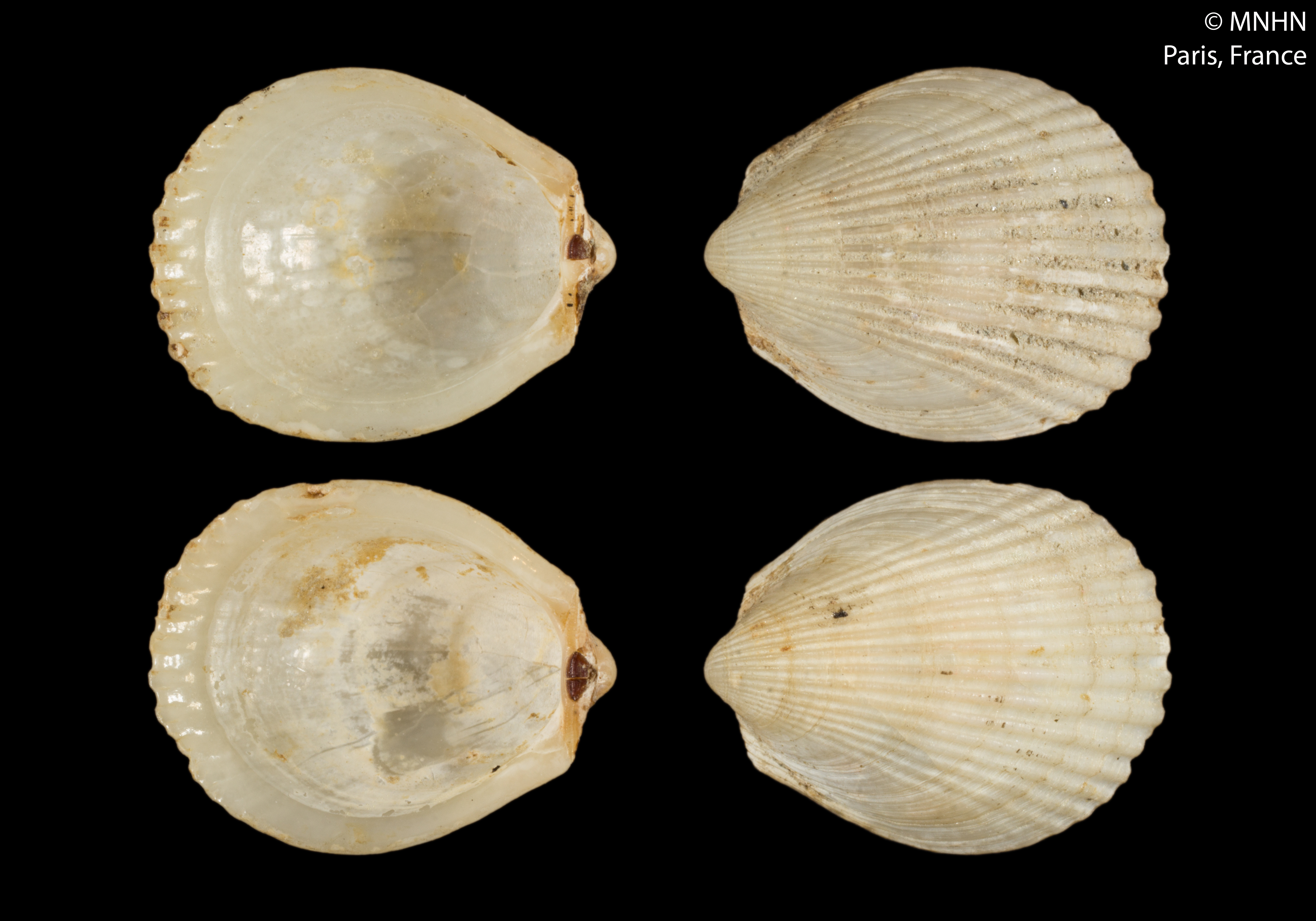
- Limea pygmaea shells

Scientific classification
- Kingdom: Animalia
- Phylum: Mollusca
- Class: Bivalvia
- Order: Limida
- Family: Limidae
- Genus: Limea
- Species: L. pygmaea

Binomial name
- Limea pygmaea (Philippi, 1845)

Synonyms
- Lima falklandica A. Adams, 1863; Lima hodgsoni Tomlin, 1948; Lima pygmaea Philippi, 1845; Limatula falklandica A. Adams, 1864; Limatula pygmaea Philippi, 1845; Limea martiali Rochebrune & Mabille, 1889

= Limea pygmaea =

Species of bivalve

Limea pygmaea is a species of bivalve mollusc in the family Limidae, the file shells or file clams.
