= Limea =

Scientific classification
- Domain: Eukaryota
- Kingdom: Animalia
- Phylum: Mollusca
- Class: Bivalvia
- Order: Limida
- Family: Limidae
- Genus: Limea; Bronn, 1831

Genus of bivalves

Limea is a genus of bivalves belonging to the family Limidae.

The genus has cosmopolitan distribution.

Species:

- Lima claytonensis (Dickerson, 1914)
- Lima margineplicata (Klipstein, 1843)
- Limea alticosta Tate, 1886
- Limea argentinae Allen, 2004
- Limea australis (E.A.Smith, 1891)
- Limea austrina Tate, 1887
- Limea broccha (Marwick, 1931)
- Limea bronniana (Dall, 1886)
- Limea chathamensis Marwick, 1928
- Limea clandestina (Salas, 1994)
- Limea coani (Bernard, 1988)
- Limea crassa (Forbes, 1844)
- Limea crenocostata Kilburn, 1990
- Limea delanouei Oppenheim, 1902
- Limea deliciosa (Thiele, 1920)
- Limea inconspicua (Marwick, 1926)
- Limea juglandula (Melvill & Standen, 1907)
- Limea kowiensis (W.H.Turton, 1932)
- Limea lata Dall, 1886
- Limea limopsis (Nomura & Zinbo, 1934)
- Limea lirata Allen, 2004
- Limea millesquamata (Thiele, 1920)
- Limea murrayi Smith, 1891
- Limea opulenta (Thiele, 1920)
- Limea parvula Verco, 1908
- Limea pectinata (H.Adams, 1870)
- Limea pygmaea (Philippi, 1845)
- Limea riparia P.A.Maxwell, 1992
- Limea sarsii (Forbes, 1844) 2020
- Limea solida (Dall, 1898)
- Limea strigilata (Brocchi, 1814)
- Limea tenuisculptata Cossmann, 1887
- Limea torresiana (E.A.Smith, 1885)
- Limea tosana (Oyama, 1943)
- Limea transenna Tate, 1886
