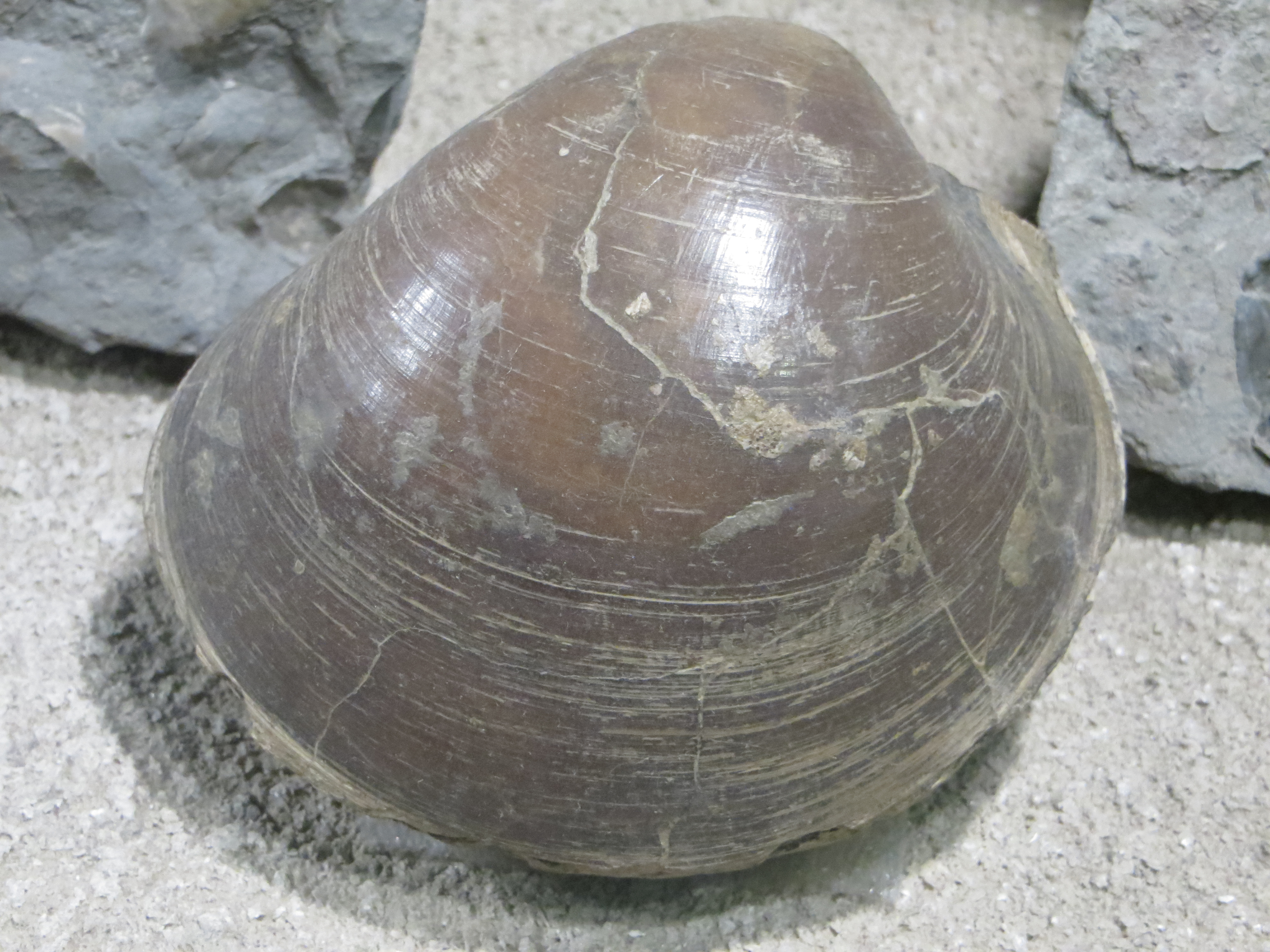
- A fossil cast of Plagiostoma giganteum

Scientific classification
- Kingdom: Animalia
- Phylum: Mollusca
- Class: Bivalvia
- Order: Limida
- Family: Limidae
- Genus: †Plagiostoma; Sowerby, 1814

= Plagiostoma (bivalve) =

Plagiostoma Temporal range: Mid Triassic–Upper Cretaceous

Extinct genus of bivalves

Plagiostoma is a genus of fossil saltwater clams, marine bivalve mollusks in the family Limidae, the file clams.

== Species ==
- Plagiostoma aurita Popov 1964
- Plagiostoma bellula Morris and Lycett 1853
- Plagiostoma delettrei Coquand 1852
- Plagiostoma deltoideum Girty 1909
- Plagiostoma dianense Guo 1985
- Plagiostoma euximium Bayle 1878
- Plagiostoma gejiuense Guo 1985
- Plagiostoma gigantea Boehm 1911
- Plagiostoma giganteum Sowerby 1814
- Plagiostoma harronis Dacque 1905
- Plagiostoma hermanni Voltz 1830
- Plagiostoma immensum Repin 2013
- Plagiostoma inversa Waagen 1881
- Plagiostoma lenaensis Kurushin 1998
- Plagiostoma malinovskyi Bytschkov 1976
- Plagiostoma nudum Parona 1889
- Plagiostoma popovi Kurushin 1985
- Plagiostoma punctatum Sowerby 1818
- Plagiostoma rodburgensis Whidborne 1883
- Plagiostoma semicircularis Goldfuss 1835
- Plagiostoma striatum Schlotheim 1820
- Plagiostoma sublaeviusculum Krumbeck 1905
- Plagiostoma subsimplex Thomas and Peron 1891
- Plagiostoma subvaloniense Krumbeck 1923
- Plagiostoma tihensis Abbass 1962

== Distribution ==
This cosmopolitan genus occurs in Mid Triassic to Upper Cretaceous strata (from 295.0 to 66.043 Ma.)

== Description ==
These bivalves are epifaunal byssate suspension feeders of up to 12 cm in size. The shells are obliquely ovate, moderately inflated, with obtuse posterior and smaller anterior wings.

Plagiostoma giganteum is a well-known fossil bivalve which occurs in the Blue Lias formation in various parts of the United Kingdom, although it is geographically widespread and has also been found in the Triassic of the United Kingdom.

== Gallery ==
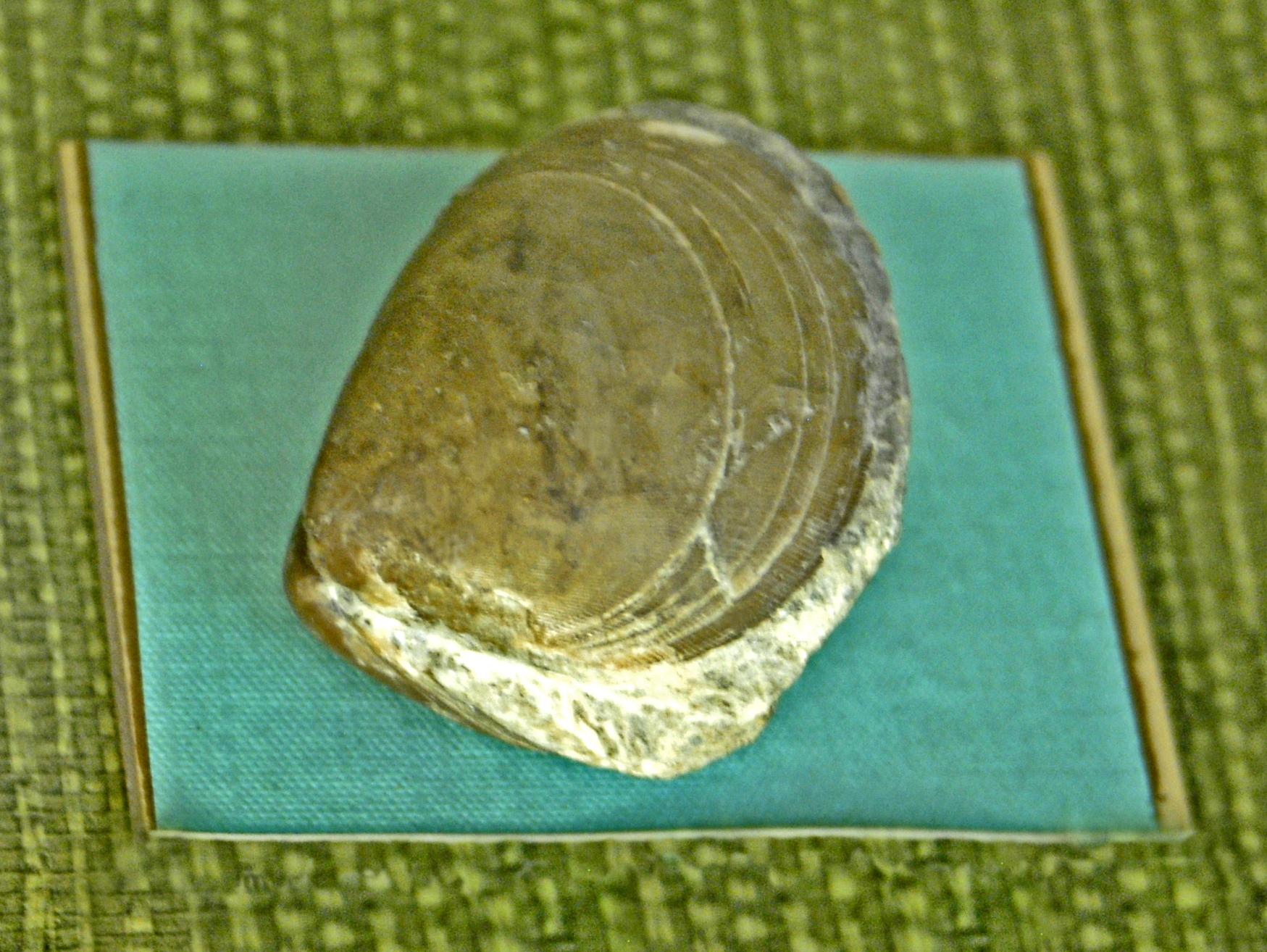
Plagiostoma punctatum

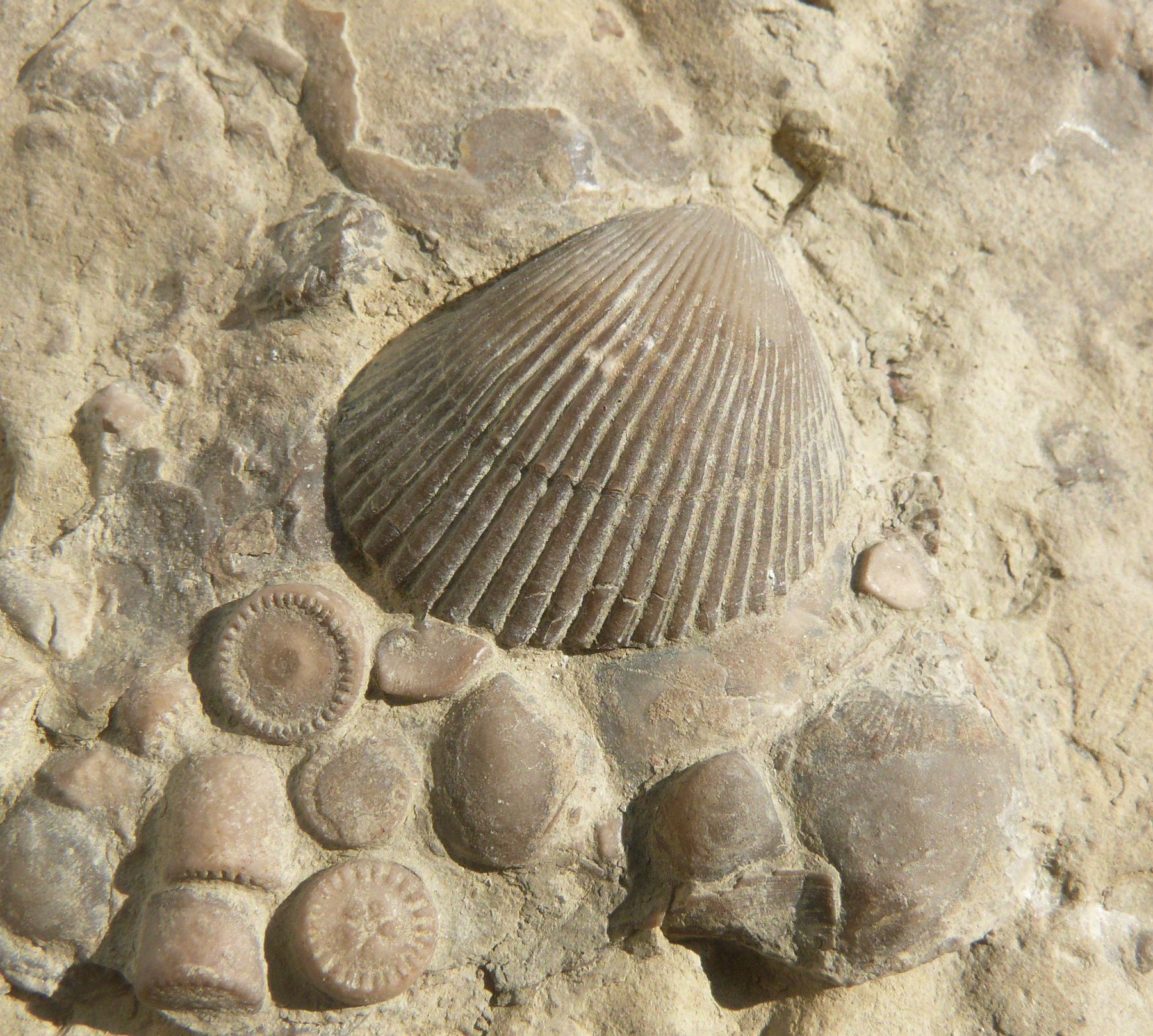
Plagiostoma striatum

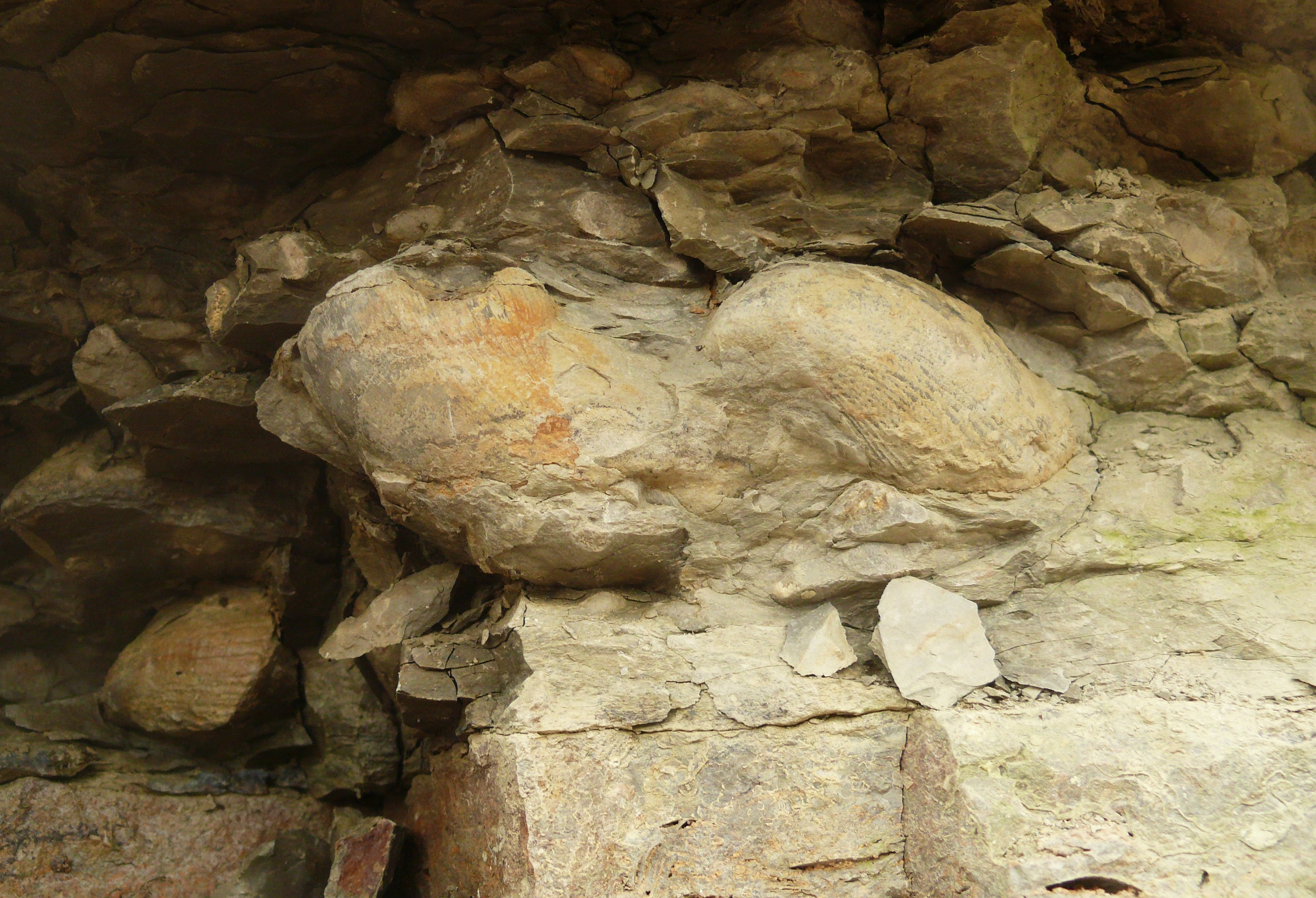
Plagiostoma lineatum

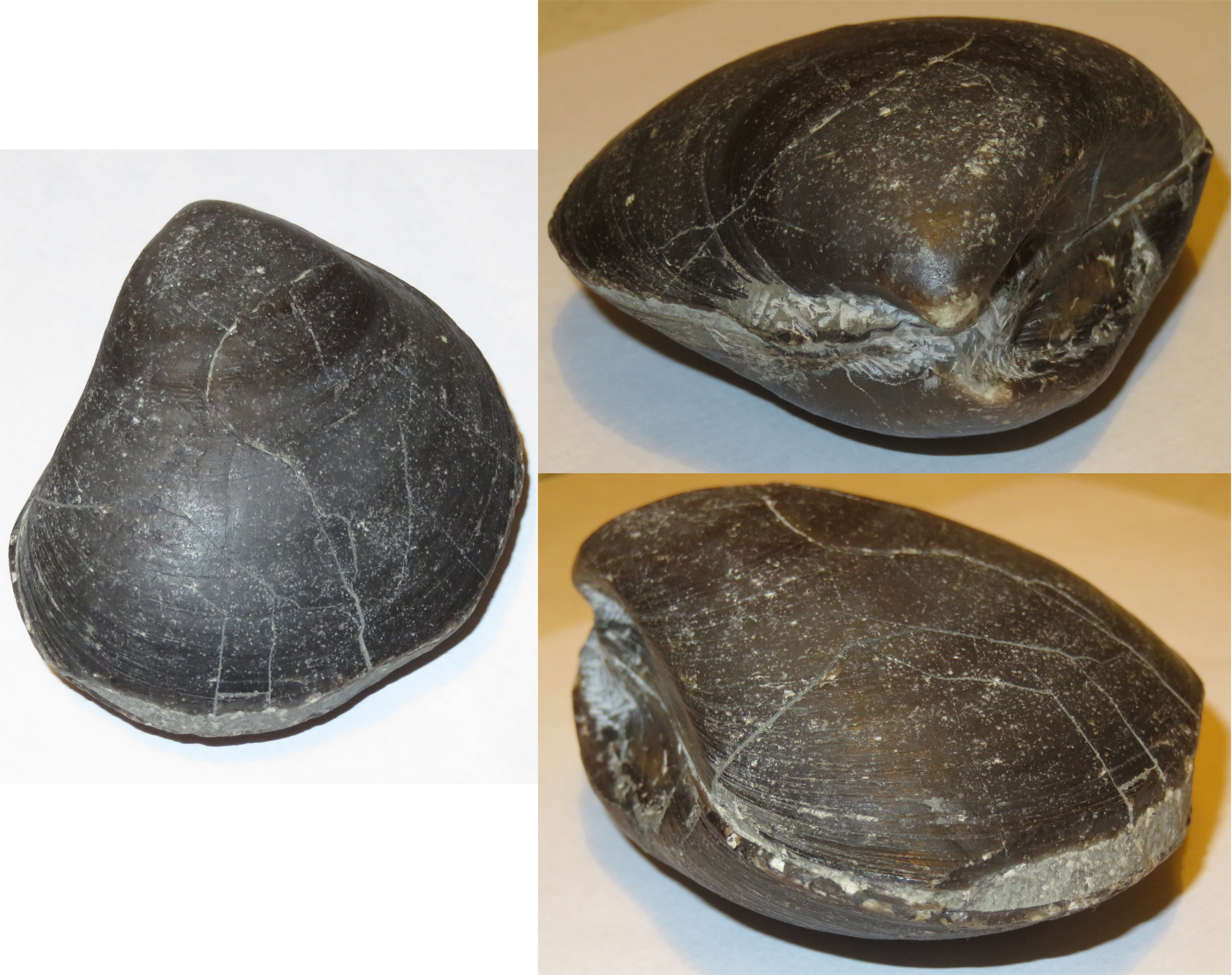
Plagiostoma giganteum

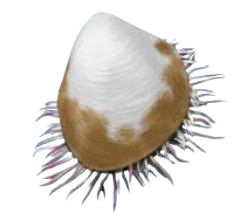
Life reconstruction of Plagiostoma gigantea
