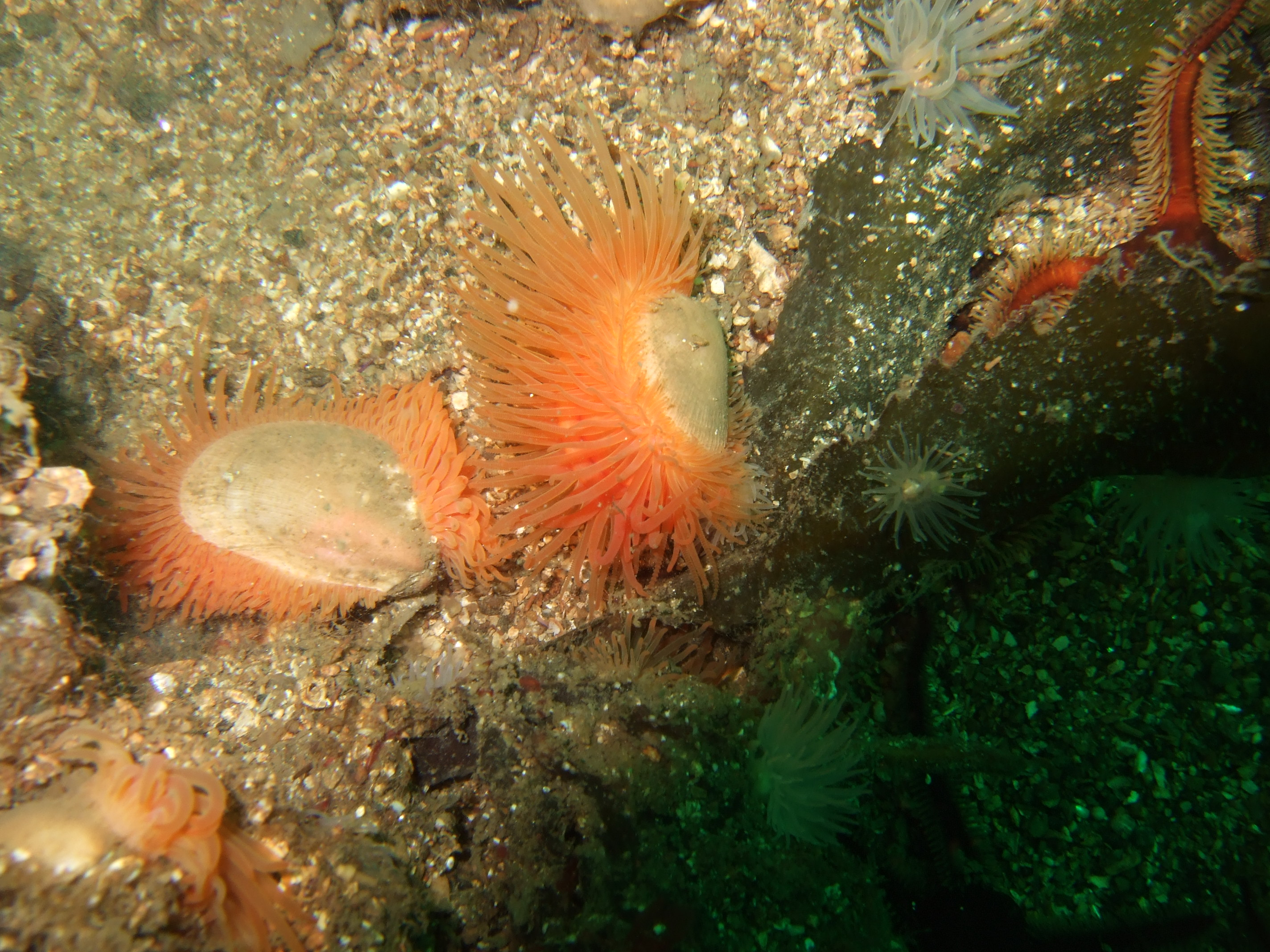
- Two live Limaria hians in Loch Carron, Scotland

Scientific classification
- Kingdom: Animalia
- Phylum: Mollusca
- Class: Bivalvia
- Order: Limida
- Family: Limidae
- Genus: Limaria; Rafinesque, 1815

Species
- See text

= Limaria =

Genus of bivalves

Limaria, the file shells or file clams, is a genus of marine bivalve molluscs in the family Limidae.

== Description ==
Shells of species in this genus are thin. The valves are swollen and the shells gape at both ends. There are no teeth on the hinge line. When alive, these species can be recognized by the fact that the soft tissues are red and a large number of tentacles are visible beyond the edges of the shell.

== Species ==
The following species are found within the genus Limaria according to the World Register of Marine Species:

- Limaria africana (Bartsch, 1915)
- Limaria amakusaensis (Habe, 1960)
- Limaria angustata (G.B. Sowerby II, 1872)
- Limaria arcuata Turton, 1932
- Limaria auaua (Dall, Bartsch & Rehder, 1938)
- Limaria basilanica (Adams & Reeve, 1850)
- Limaria cumingii (G.B. Sowerby II, 1843)
- Limaria dentata (G.B. Sowerby II, 1843)
- Limaria fenestrata (Prashad, 1932)
- Limaria fragilis (Gmelin, 1791)
- Limaria hakodatensis (Tokunaga, 1906)
- Limaria hawaiana (Dall, Bartsch & Rehder, 1938)
- Limaria hemphilli (Hertlein & Strong, 1946)
- Limaria hians (Gmelin, 1791)
- Limaria hirasei (Pilsbry, 1901)
- Limaria hyalina (Verrill & Bush, 1898)
- Limaria keohea (Dall, Bartsch & Rehder, 1938)
- Limaria kiiensis (Oyama, 1943)
- Limaria lahaina (Dall, Bartsch & Rehder, 1938)
- Limaria locklini (McGinty, 1955)
- Limaria loscombi (G. B. Sowerby, I, 1823)
- Limaria orbignyi (Lamy, 1930)
- Limaria orientalis (Adams & Reeve, 1850)
- Limaria pacifica (d'Orbigny, 1846)
- Limaria parallela (Dall, Bartsch & Rehder, 1938)
- Limaria pellucida (C. B. Adams, 1846) - Antillean fileclam
- Limaria perfragilis (Habe & Kosuge, 1966)
- Limaria rotundata (G.B. Sowerby II, 1843)
- Limaria stertum (Iredale, 1939)
- Limaria thryptica (Penna-Neme, 1971)
- Limaria tuberculata (Olivi, 1792)
- Limaria valdiviesae F. R. Bernard, 1988
- Limaria viali (Jousseaume in Lamy, 1920)
