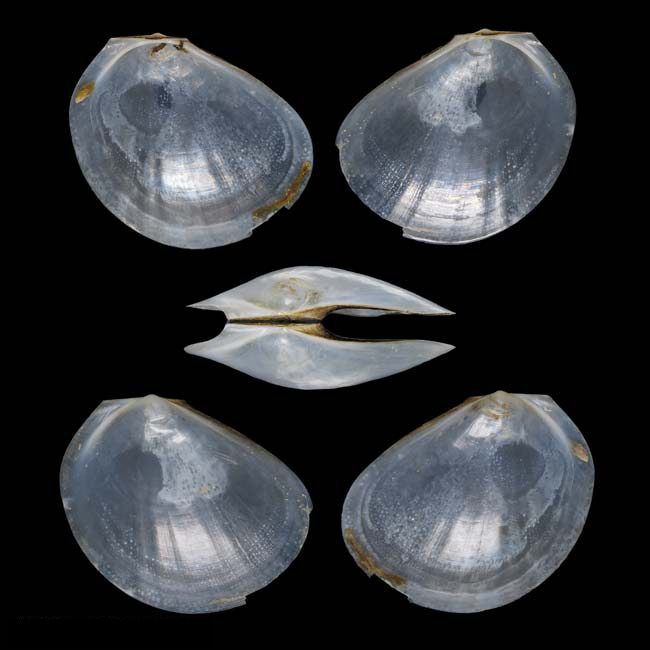

Scientific classification
- Kingdom: Animalia
- Phylum: Mollusca
- Class: Bivalvia
- Order: Limida
- Family: Limidae
- Genus: Acestarica; Dekkers, 2022
- Species: A. vitrina

Binomial name
- Acestarica vitrina (Poppe, Tagaro & Stahlschmidt, 2015)

Synonyms
- Acesta vitrina Poppe, Tagaro & Stahlschmidt, 2015 superseded combination

= Acestarica =

Genus of molluscs

Acestarica is a genus of marine bivalve mollusc in the family Limidae. Acestarica vitrina is the only species in the genus.

== Distribution ==
This species occurs off the Philippines.
