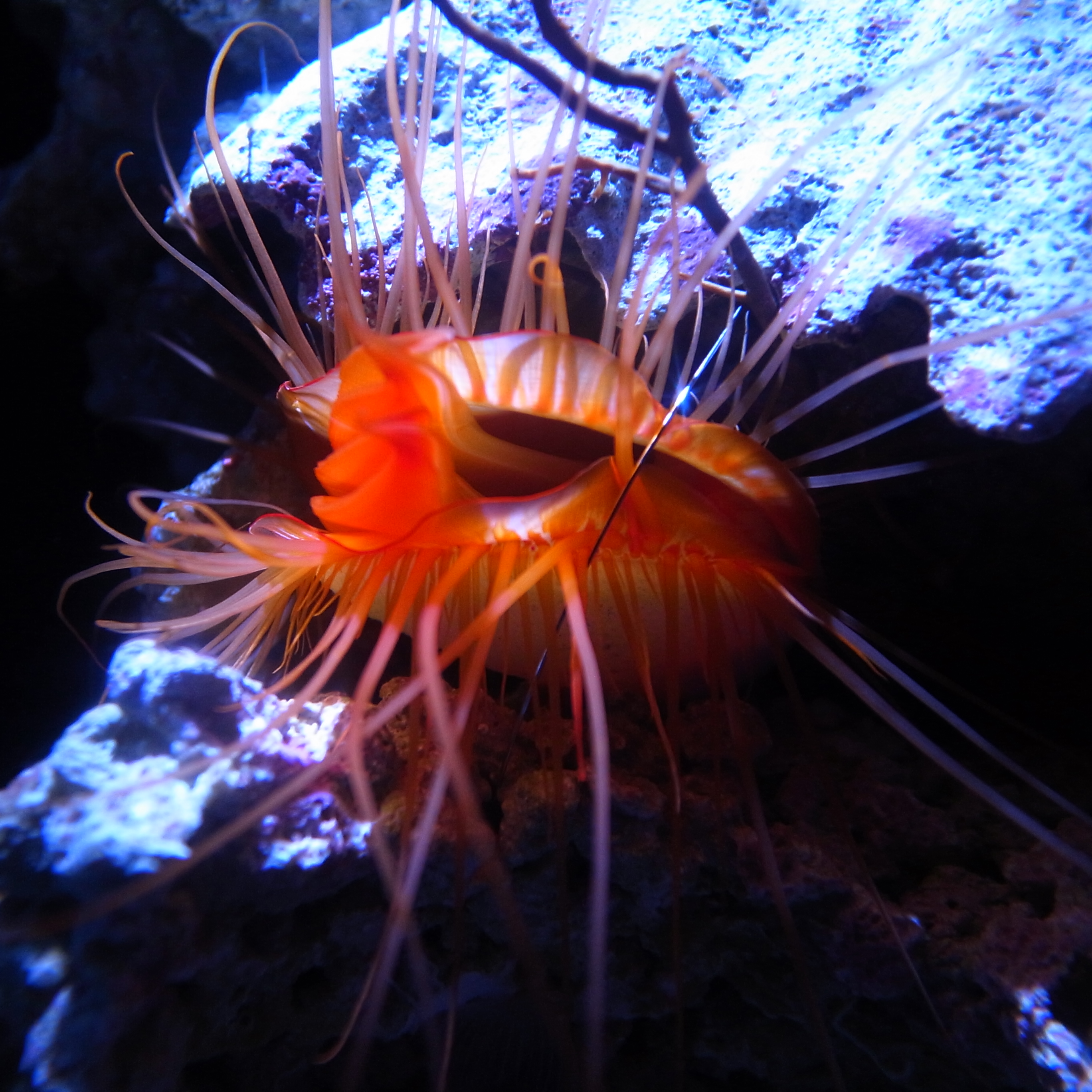
- Ctenoides ales

Scientific classification
- Domain: Eukaryota
- Kingdom: Animalia
- Phylum: Mollusca
- Class: Bivalvia
- Order: Limida
- Family: Limidae
- Genus: Ctenoides; Mörch, 1853

= Ctenoides =

Genus of bivalves

Ctenoides is a genus of bivalves belonging to the family Limidae.

The genus has almost cosmopolitan distribution.

== Species ==
Species:

- Ctenoides ales (Finlay, 1927)
- Ctenoides annulatus (Lamarck, 1819)
- Ctenoides catherinae Cosel, 1995
