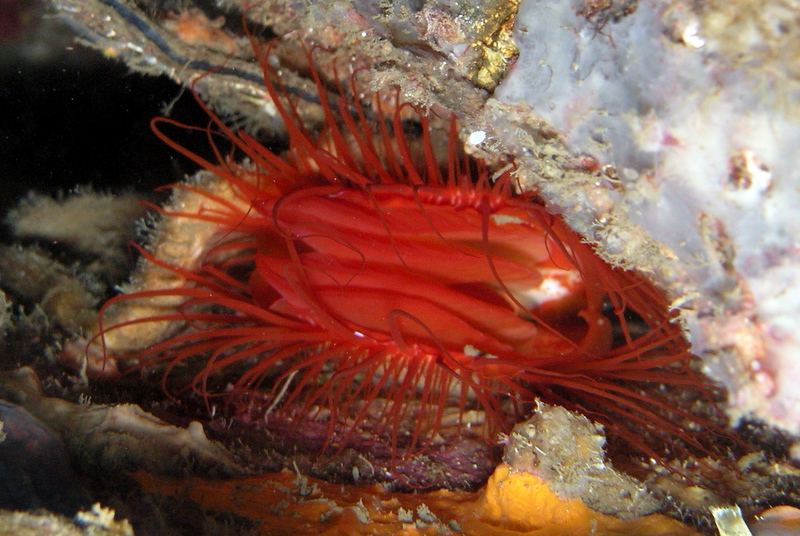
- Ctenoides ales

Scientific classification
- Kingdom: Animalia
- Phylum: Mollusca
- Class: Bivalvia
- Subclass: Pteriomorphia
- Order: Limida; Moore, 1952
- Superfamily: Limoidea; Rafinesque, 1815
- Family: Limidae; Rafinesque, 1815

Genera
- See text

= Limidae =

Family of bivalves

The Limidae or file shells are members of the only family of bivalve molluscs in the order Limida. The family includes 130 living species, assigned to 10 genera. Widely distributed in all seas from shallow to deep waters, the species are usually epifaunal or nestling, with many species building byssal nests for protection. The majority of species are capable of irregular swimming by waving their long mantle tentacles.

== Taxonomy ==
The phylogenetic tree based on molecular genetic analyses per Smedley et al. (2019) is as follows:

- Limidae
- - Entoliidae
  - - - Spondylidae
      - Propeamussiidae
    - Pectinidae

=== Genera ===
All taxa marked † are extinct.

- Acesta H. and A. Adams, 1858
- †Antiquilima Cox, 1943
- Acestarica Dekkers, 2022
- † Antiquilima L. R. Cox, 1943
- Ctenoides Mörch, 1853
- †Ctenostreon Eichwald, 1862
- †Dimorphoconcha Wasmer & Hautmann, 2012
- Divarilima Powell, 1958
- Escalima Iredale, 1929
- Lima Bruguière, 1789
- Limaria Link, 1807
- Limatula S. V. Wood, 1839
- Limea Bronn, 1831
- Mantellina Sacco, 1904
- † Palaeolima Hind, 1903
- †Plagiostoma J. Sowerby, 1814
- †Pseudolimea Arkell, 1933
- † Seymourtula Zinsmeister, 1988
