= List of the prehistoric life of Louisiana =

This list of the prehistoric life of Louisiana contains the various prehistoric life-forms whose fossilized remains have been reported from within the US state of Louisiana.

== Precambrian-Paleozoic ==
The Paleobiology Database records no known occurrences of Precambrian or Paleozoic fossils in Louisiana.

== Mesozoic ==
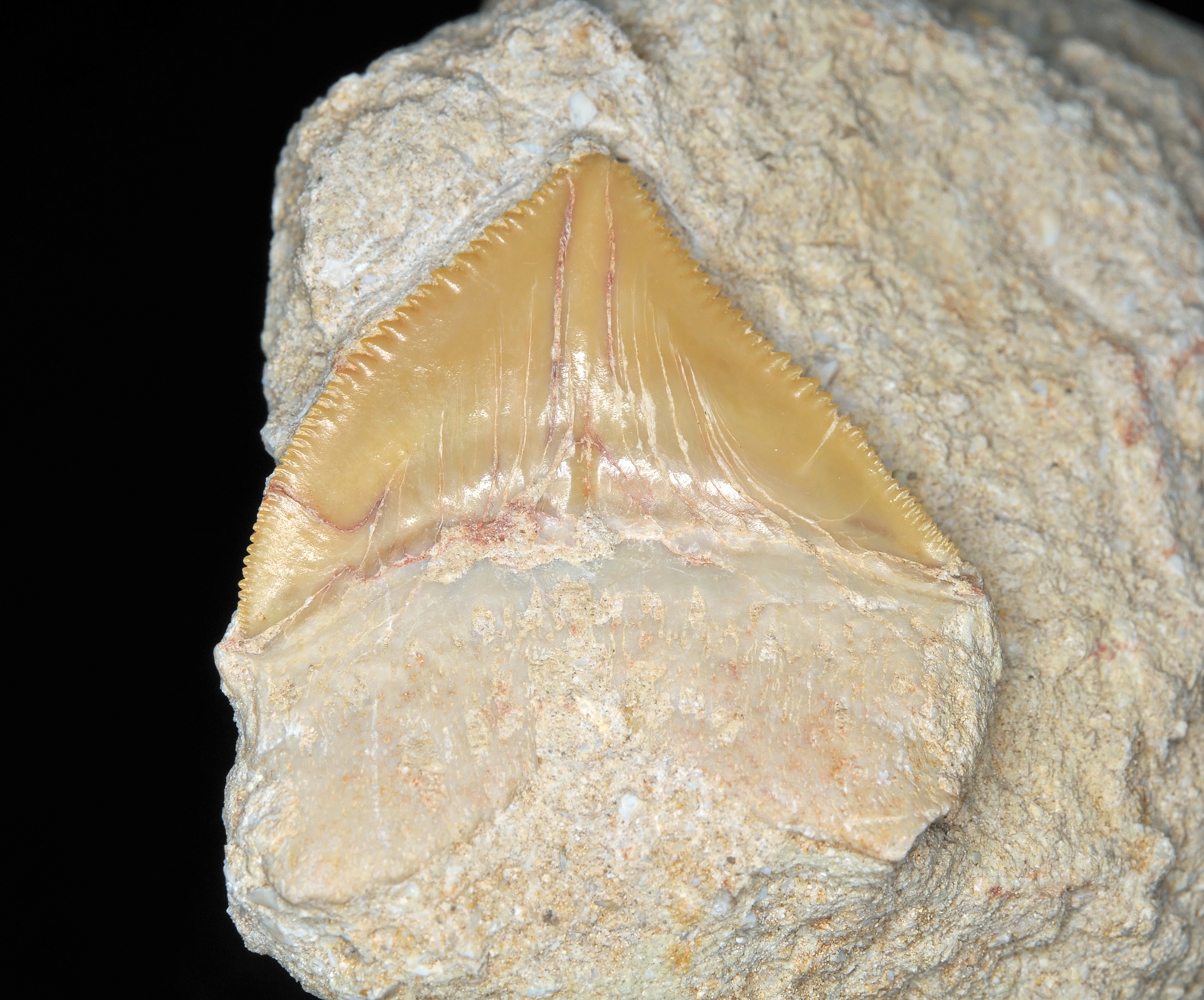
Fossilized tooth of the Late Cretaceous shark Squalicorax pristodontus

- †Dufrenoyia
  - †Dufrenoyia dufrenoyi – or unidentified related form
  - †Dufrenoyia texana
- †Hypacanthoplites
- †Parahoplites – tentative report
- †Pseudosaynella
- †Rhytidhoplites
  - †Rhytidhoplites robertsi
- Squalicorax
  - †Squalicorax pristodontus

== Cenozoic ==
This list of the Cenozoic life of Louisiana contains the various prehistoric life-forms whose fossilized remains have been reported from within the US state of Louisiana and are between 66 million and 10,000 years of age.

=== A ===
- †Abderospira
  - †Abderospira leblanci
  - †Abderospira oviformis
  - †Abderospira stewarti
- †Abdounia
  - †Abdounia enniskilleni
- Abra
  - †Abra nitens
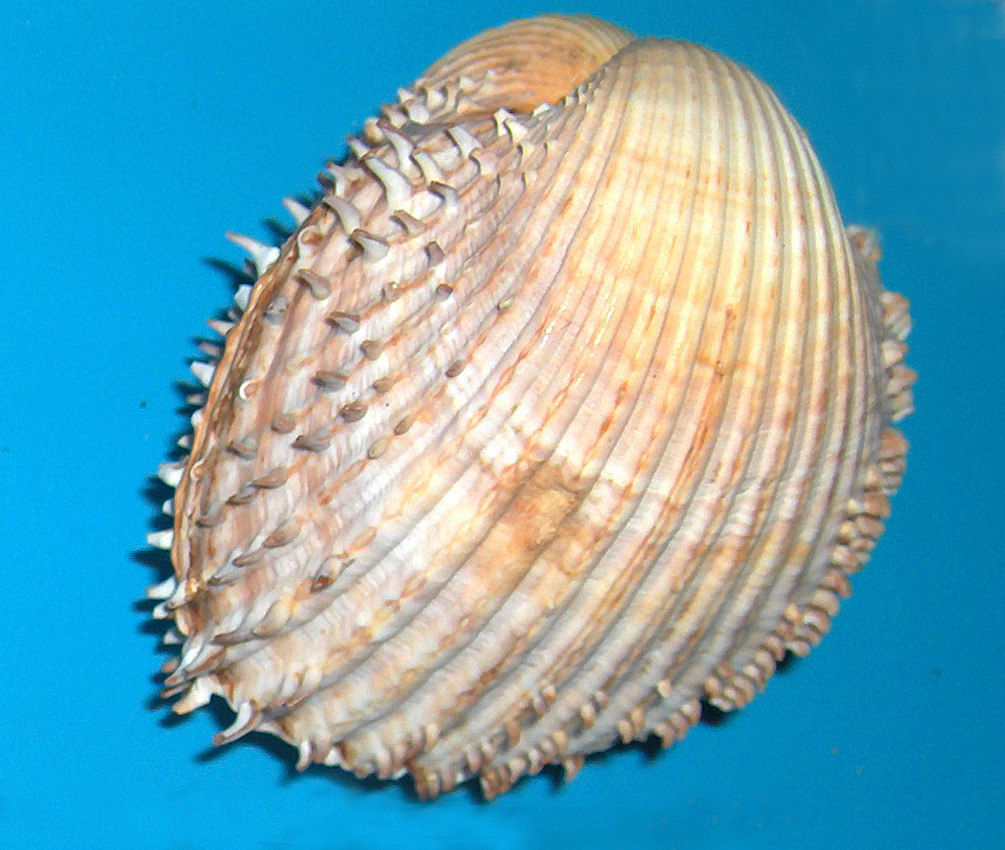
- Shell of an Acanthocardia cockle
  Acanthocardia
  - †Acanthocardia tuomeyi
- †Aciculiscala
  - †Aciculiscala jacobi
- Acirsa
  - †Acirsa whitneyi
- Aclis – report made of unidentified related form or using admittedly obsolete nomenclature
  - †Aclis modesta
- Acteon
  - †Acteon annectens
  - †Acteon idoneus
  - †Acteon pomilius
- Actinocythereis
  - †Actinocythereis rosefieldensis
- †Adeorbis
  - †Adeorbis sylvaerupis – or unidentified comparable form
- Adrana
  - †Adrana aldrichiana
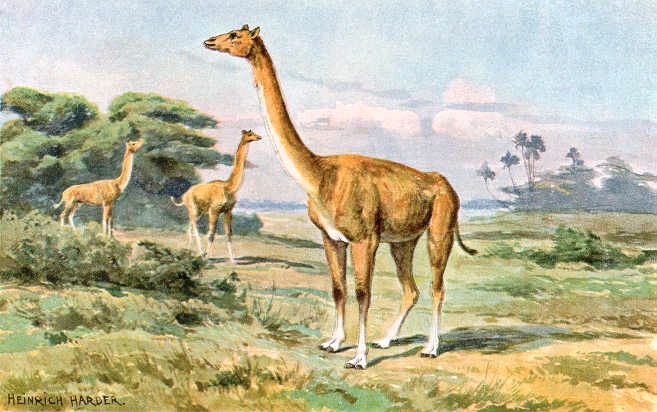
- Life restoration of the Miocene camel Aepycamelus, or the long-necked camel. Heinrich Harder (1920).
  †Aepycamelus
- †Aesculiidites
  - †Aesculiidites circumstriatus
- Aetobatus
- Agaronia
  - †Agaronia media
  - †Agaronia mississippiensis
- †Alatocythereis – tentative report
- Albula
- †Allomorone
- †Alnipollenites
  - †Alnipollenites trina
  - †Alnipollenites verus
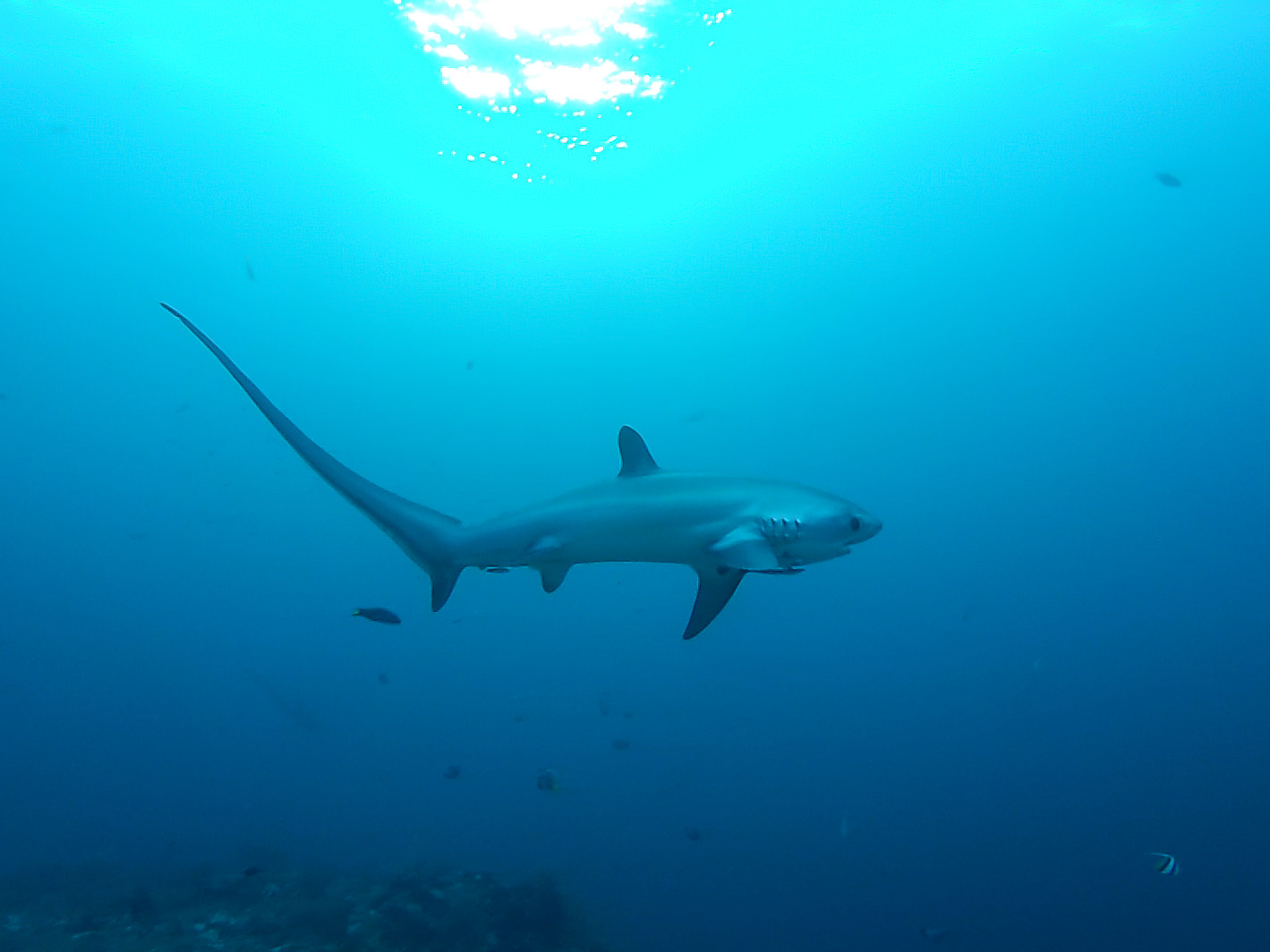
- A living Alopias, or thresher shark
  Alopias
  - †Alopias latidens
- †Alveinus
  - †Alveinus minutus
  - †Alveinus sinutus
- Ammospermophilus – tentative report
- †Ampullina
  - †Ampullina alabamiensis
- Anadara
  - †Anadara vaughani
- Ancilla
  - †Ancilla staminea
- Angulogerina
  - †Angulogerina byramensis
- †Anisonchus
  - †Anisonchus fortunatus – type locality for species
- Anomalinoides
  - †Anomalinoides danvillensis
- Anomia
  - †Anomia hammetti
  - †Anomia lisbonensis
  - †Anomia rufa
- Antalis
  - †Antalis danvillense
  - †Antalis minutistriatum
  - †Antalis mississippiense
- Antrozous
- †Aphelops
- Aplodinotus
  - †Aplodinotus distortus
  - †Aplodinotus gemma
- Architectonica
  - †Architectonica acuta
  - †Architectonica alveatum
  - †Architectonica amoena
  - †Architectonica bellense
  - †Architectonica bellistriata
  - †Architectonica meekana
  - †Architectonica ornata
- Arcopagia
  - †Arcopagia eburneopsis
  - †Arcopagia raveneli
- Arcoscalpellum
  - †Arcoscalpellum jacksonensis
- †Arecipites
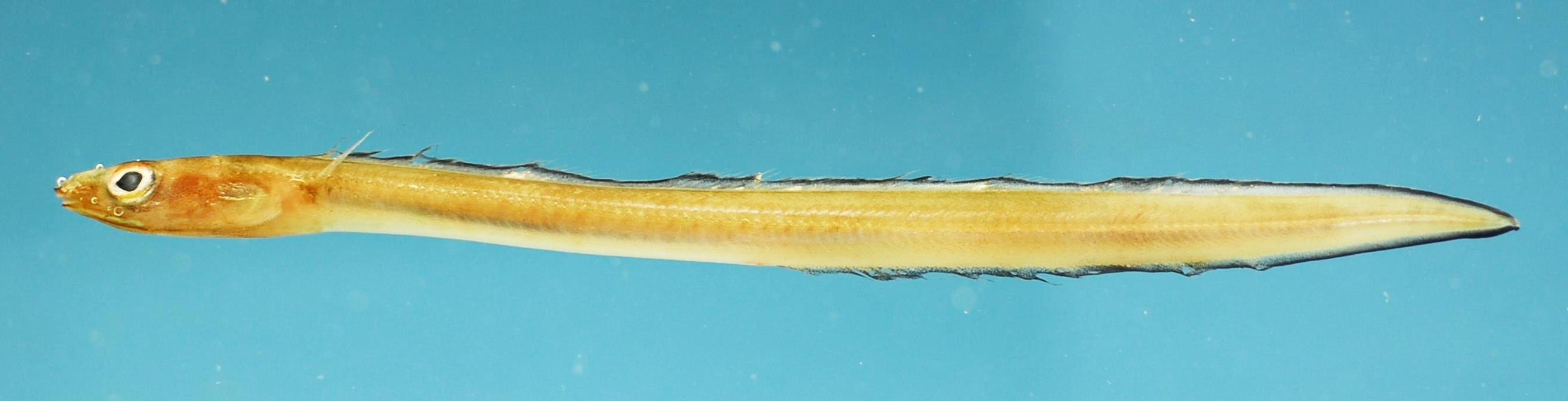
- A living Ariosoma conger eel
  Ariosoma
- Arius
- Articulina
  - †Articulina byramensis
- Asterigerina
  - †Asterigerina subacuta
- Asthenotoma
  - †Asthenotoma danvitexa
  - †Asthenotoma eximia
  - †Asthenotoma strigosa
- Astrangia
  - †Astrangia expansa
  - †Astrangia ludoviciana – type locality for species
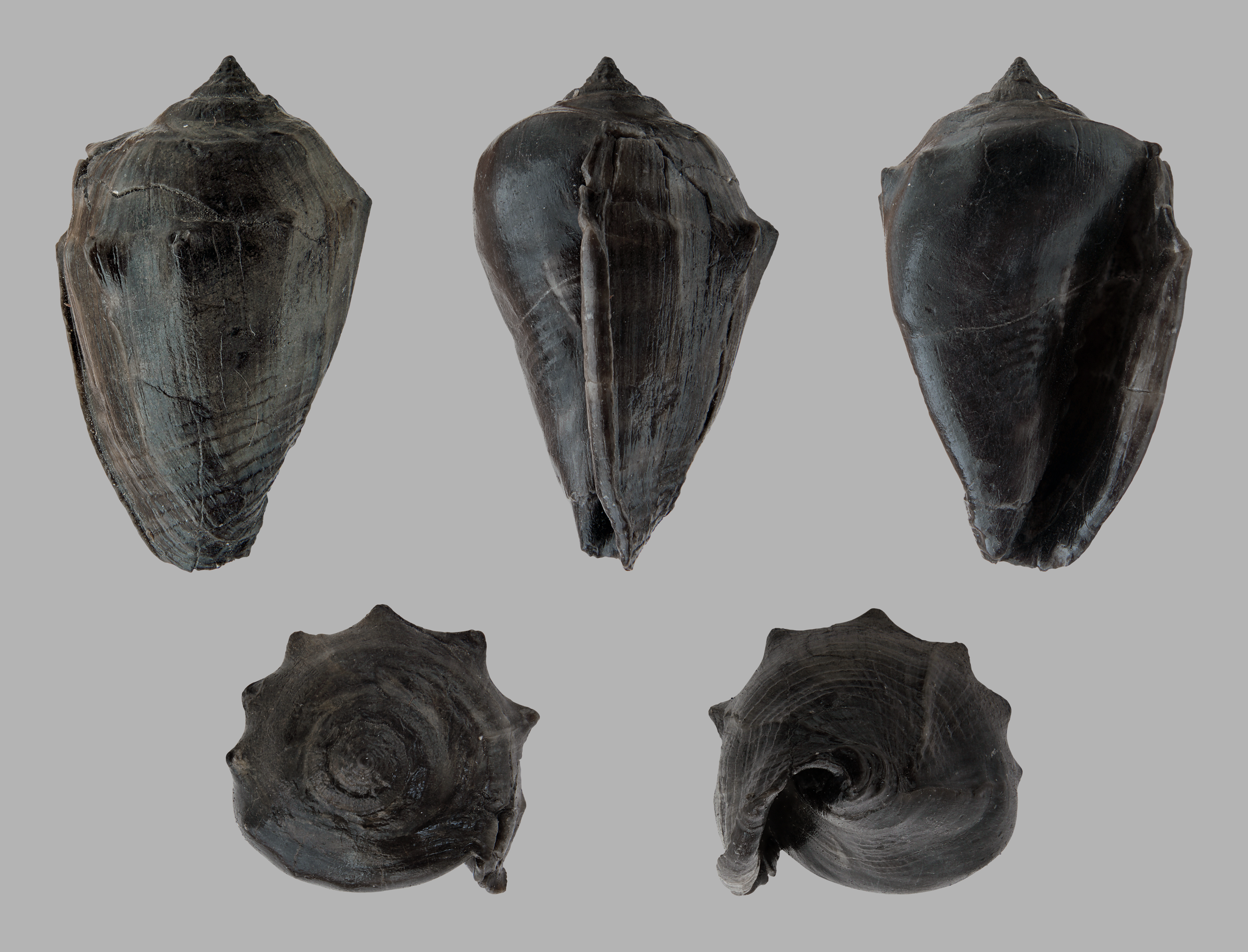
- Multiple views of a fossilized shell of the volute sea snail Athleta
  Athleta
  - †Athleta clayi
  - †Athleta haleanus
  - †Athleta petrosa
  - †Athleta symmetricus
  - †Athleta wheelockensis
- Atrina
  - †Atrina gardnerae
  - †Atrina gravida
  - †Atrina jacksoniana
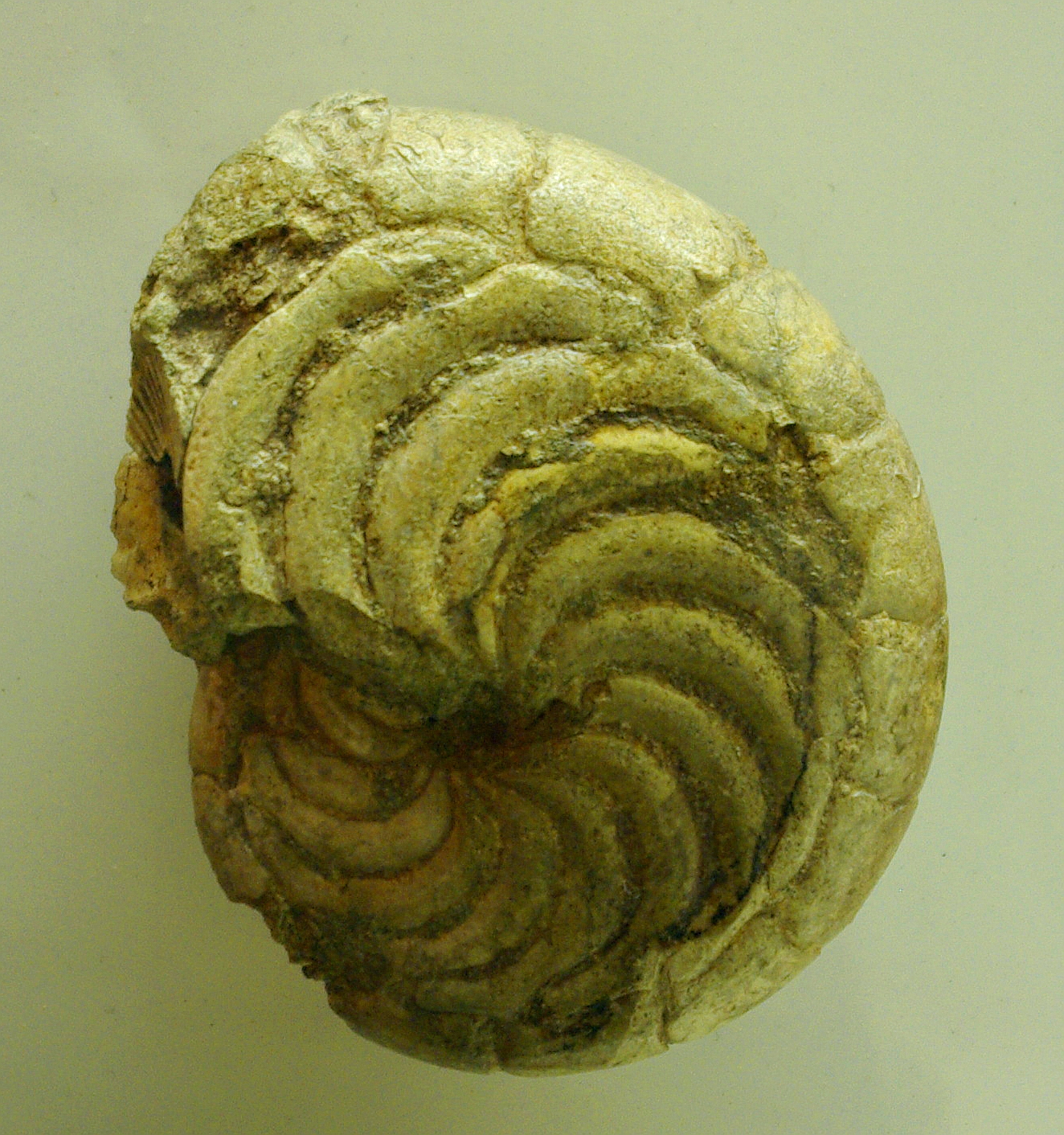
- Fossilized shell of the Paleocene-Miocene nautiloid cephalopod Aturia
  †Aturia
  - †Aturia garretti
  - †Aturia laticlavia
- Atys
  - †Atys robustoides – or unidentified comparable form
  - †Atys salina

=== B ===
- Balanophyllia
  - †Balanophyllia caulifera
  - †Balanophyllia irrorata
- Balcis
- Barbatia
  - †Barbatia cuculloides
  - †Barbatia ludoviciana
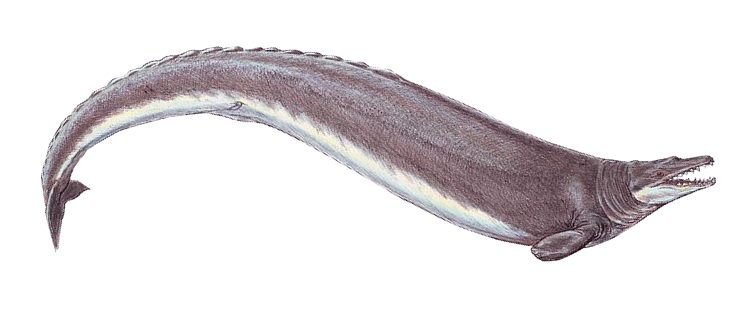
- Life restoration of the Eocene whale Basilosaurus
  †Basilosaurus – type locality for genus
  - †Basilosaurus cetoides – type locality for species
- †Basopollis
  - †Basopollis obscurocostatus
- Bassariscus
- Bathytoma
  - †Bathytoma nonplicata
- Bathytormus
  - †Bathytormus clarkensis
  - †Bathytormus flexurus
- †Batrachosauroides
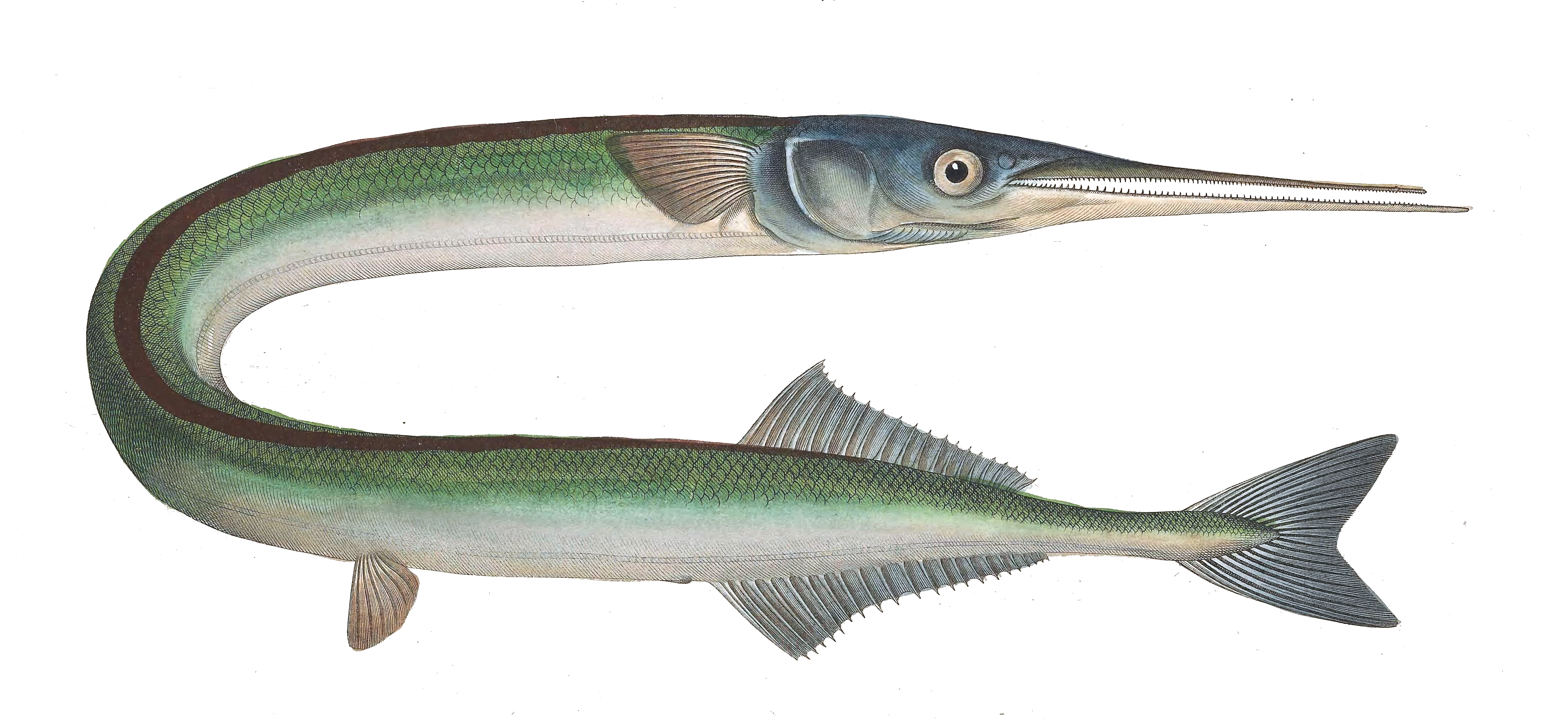
- Illustration of a living Belone needlefish
  Belone
- †Belosaepia
  - †Belosaepia uncinata
  - †Belosaepia veatchi
- †Bifarina
  - †Bifarina vicksburgensis
- Bittium
  - †Bittium koeneni
- †Bitubulogerina
  - †Bitubulogerina vicksburgensis
- Bolivina
  - †Bolivina alazanensis
  - †Bolivina beyrichi
  - †Bolivina byramensis
  - †Bolivina choctawensis
  - †Bolivina cookei
  - †Bolivina costifera
  - †Bolivina gracilis
  - †Bolivina jacksonensis
- Bolivinella
  - †Bolivinella subpectinata
  - †Bolivinella vicksburgensis
- †Bombacacidites
- †Bonellitia
  - †Bonellitia jacksonica
- †Bootherium
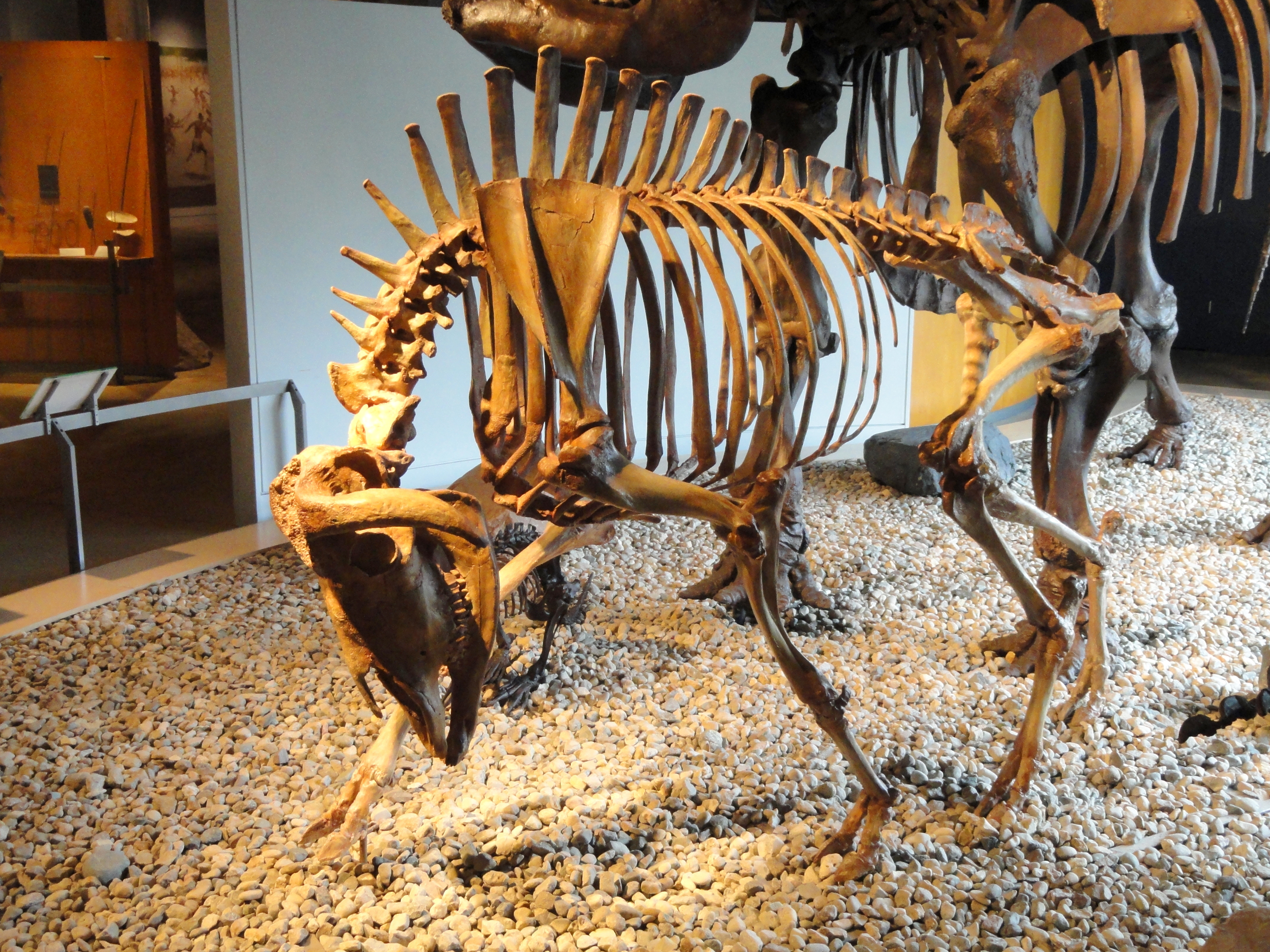
  - Fossilized skeleton of the Pleistocene-Holocene bovid Bootherium bombifrons, or Harlan's musk ox.
    †Bootherium bombifrons
- Brachidontes
  - †Brachidontes alabamensis
  - †Brachidontes stubbsi
  - †Brachidontes texanus
- †Brachyerix
  - †Brachyerix incertis – or unidentified comparable form
- †Brachysporites
- Bregmaceros
  - †Bregmaceros troelli
- †Bregmoceras
- †Bristocorbula
  - †Bristocorbula fossata
- †Brychaetus
- Buccella
  - †Buccella vicksburgensis
- Bulimina
  - †Bulimina ovata
- Buliminella
  - †Buliminella nuda
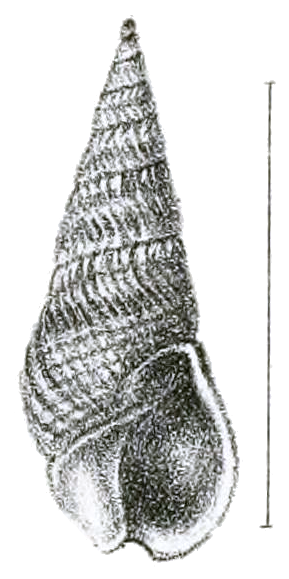
- Illustration of the shell of a Bullia nassa mud sea snail
  Bullia
  - †Bullia ellipticum
- †Bullinella
- Buntonia
  - †Buntonia huneri

=== C ===
- Cadulus
  - †Cadulus abruptus
  - †Cadulus jacksonensis
  - †Cadulus margarita
  - †Cadulus ouachitensis
  - †Cadulus subcoarcuatus
- Caestocorbula
  - †Caestocorbula fossata
  - †Caestocorbula wailesiana
  - †Caestocorbula wailsiana
- †Calamuspollenites
- †Calapa
- Callista
  - †Callista annexa
  - †Callista pearlensis
  - †Callista perovata
- †Calorhadia
  - †Calorhadia aldrichiana
  - †Calorhadia bella
  - †Calorhadia equalis
  - †Calorhadia opulenta
  - †Calorhadia reginajacksonis
  - †Calorhadia semen
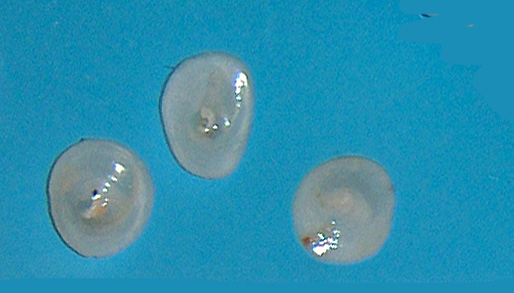
- Three modern shells of Calyptraea, or Chinese hat snails
  Calyptraea
  - †Calyptraea alta
- †Calyptraphorus
  - †Calyptraphorus aldrichi
  - †Calyptraphorus stamineus
  - †Calyptraphorus trinodiferus
  - †Calyptraphorus velatus
- Capulus
  - †Capulus americanus
- Carcharhinus
  - †Carcharhinus gibbesi
- †Carcharochles
  - †Carcharochles auriculatus
- Cardium
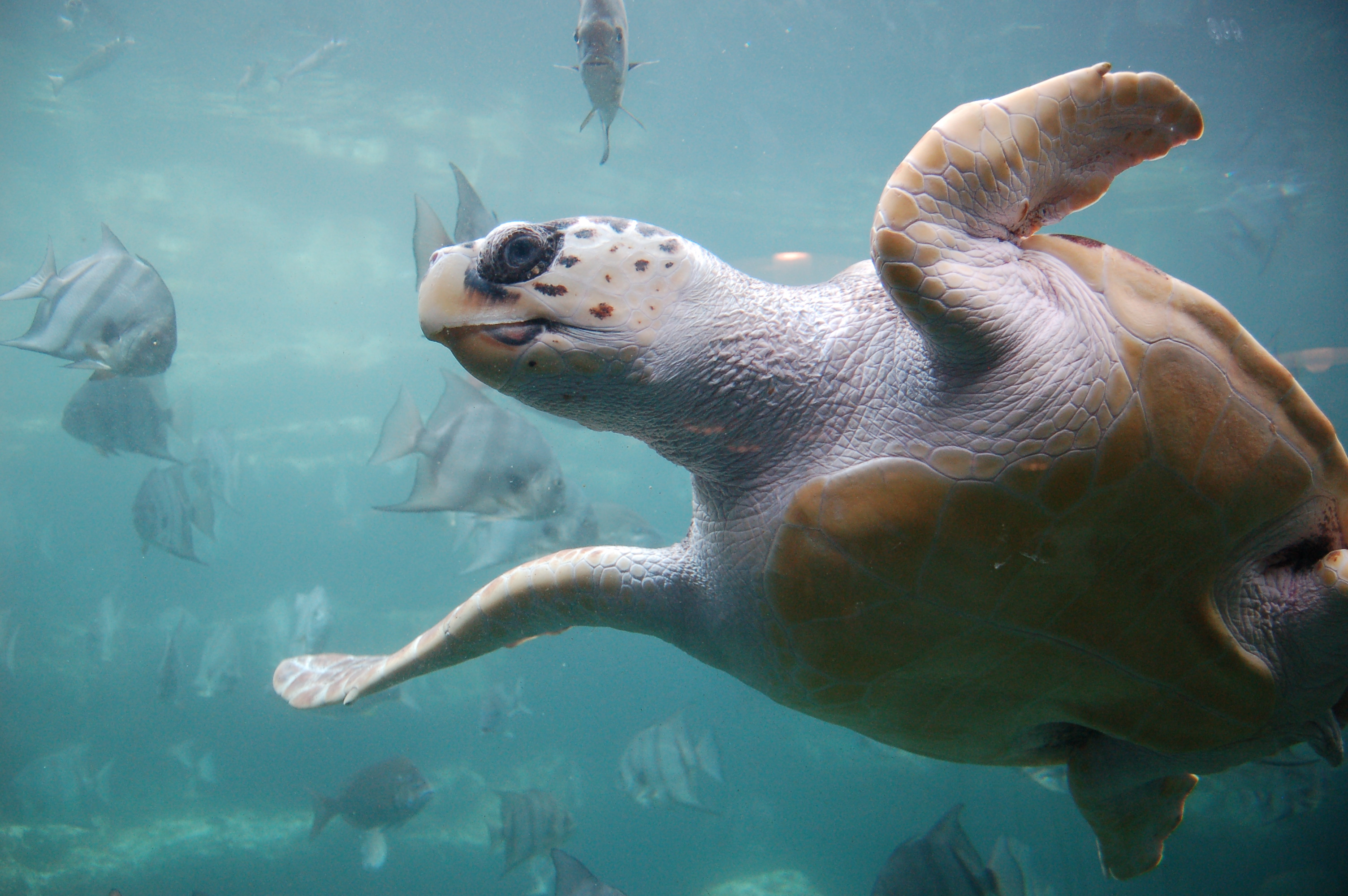
- A living Caretta caretta, or loggerhead sea turtle
  Caretta
- †Caricella
  - †Caricella demissa
  - †Caricella howei
  - †Caricella ludoviciana
  - †Caricella polita
  - †Caricella stenzeli
  - †Caricella subangulata
  - †Caricella turneri
- †Caryapollenites
  - †Caryapollenites prodromus-imparalis type
  - †Caryapollenites simplex
- Caryocorbula
  - †Caryocorbula densata
  - †Caryocorbula deusseni
  - †Caryocorbula willistoni
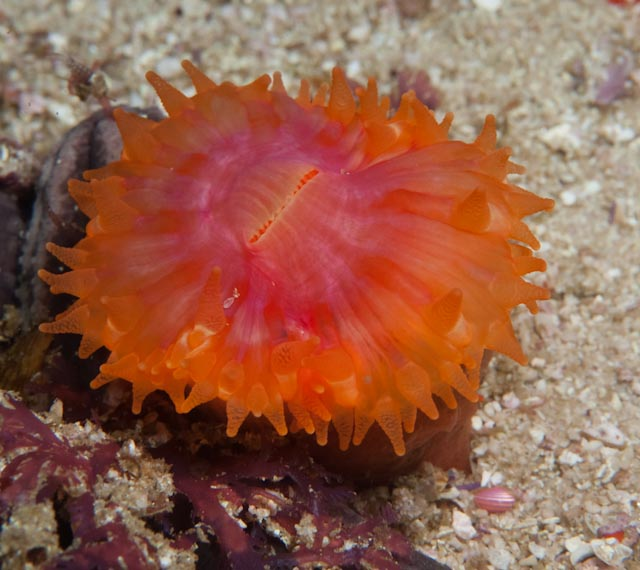
- A living Caryophyllia solitary coral
  Caryophyllia
  - †Caryophyllia dalli – type locality for species
- †Casurinidites
  - †Casurinidites pulcher
- †Cedripites
- Celleporaria
  - †Celleporaria granulosa
- †Centalium
- †Centroberys
- Centroberyx
- Centropristis
- †Cercidiphyllites
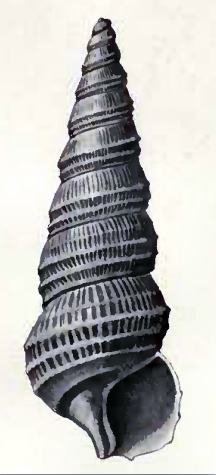
- Illustration of a shell of a Cerithiella cerith sea snail
  Cerithiella
  - †Cerithiella jacksonensis
  - †Cerithiella ouachitensis
- Chama
- †Chenopodipollis
- †Chiloguembelina
  - †Chiloguembelina cubensis
- †Chilogumbelina
  - †Chilogumbelina cubensis
- Chiton
- Chlamys
  - †Chlamys danvillensis
  - †Chlamys nupera
  - †Chlamys wahtubbeana
- Chrysalogonium
  - †Chrysalogonium vicksburgense
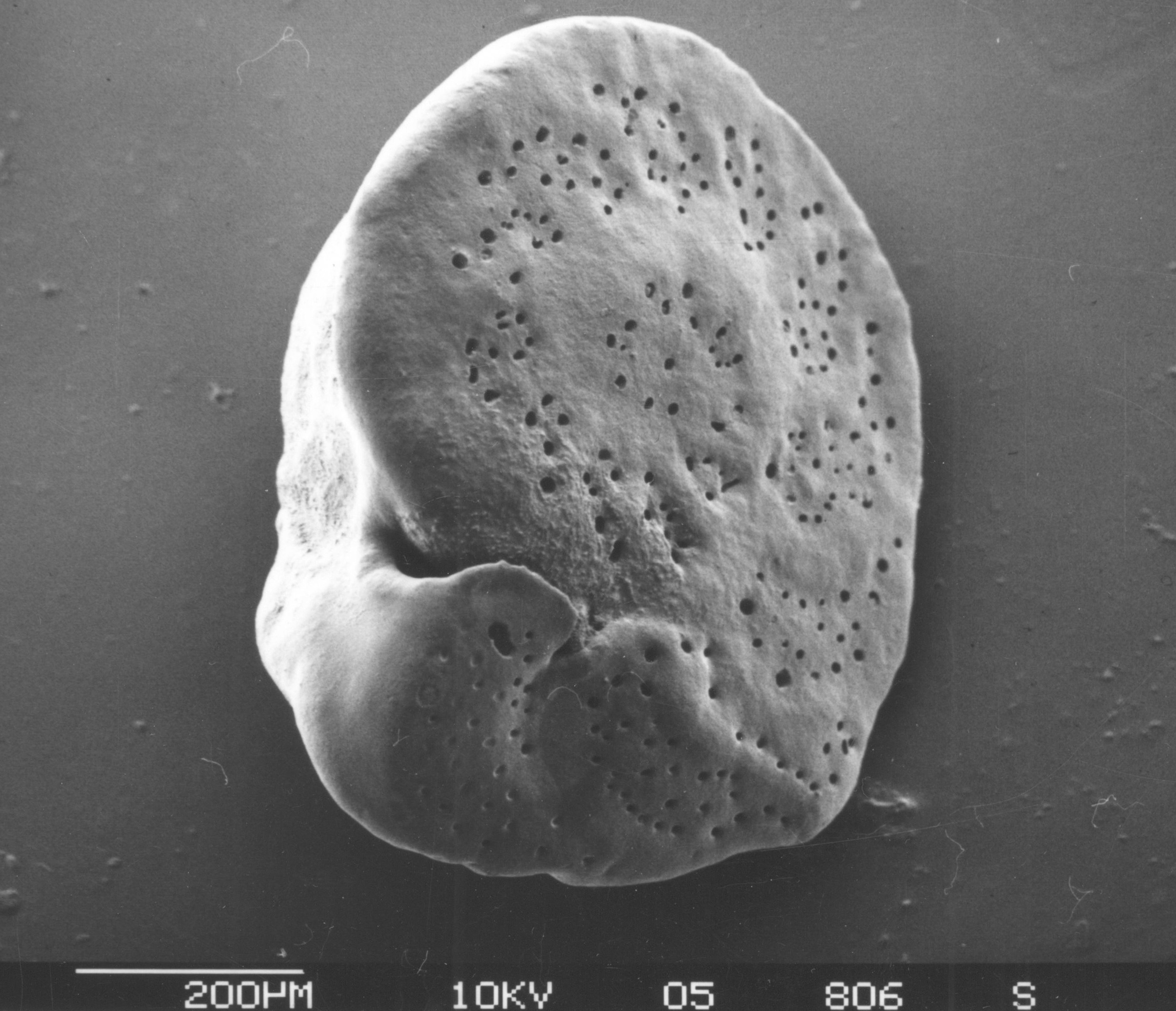
- Test of a Cibicides foraminiferan
  Cibicides
  - †Cibicides americanus
  - †Cibicides choctawensis
  - †Cibicides lobatulus
  - †Cibicides mississippiensis
  - †Cibicides pseudoungerianus
  - †Cibicides sassei
- †Cicatricosisporites
  - †Cicatricosisporites dorogensis
- Cirsotrema
  - †Cirsotrema danvillense
  - †Cirsotrema nassulum
  - †Cirsotrema ranellinum
- Citharichthys
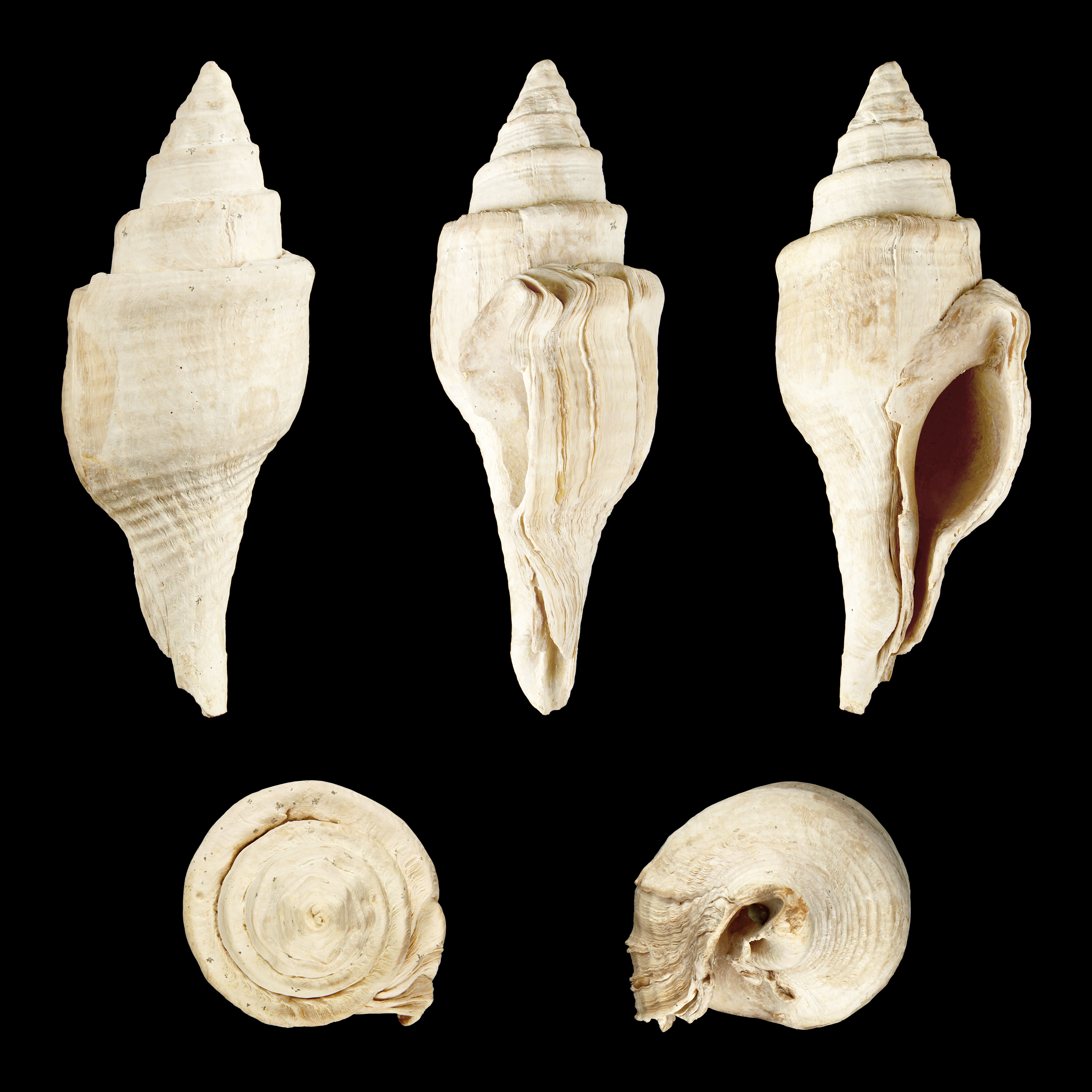
- Multiple views of a fossilized shell of the Paleocene-Pliocene spindle sea snail Clavilithes
  Clavilithes
  - †Clavilithes humerosus
  - †Clavilithes kennedyanus
  - †Clavilithes penrosei
  - †Clavilithes regexus
  - †Clavilithes texanus
- Closia
  - †Closia larvata
  - †Closia semen
  - †Closia semenoides
- Cochlespira
  - †Cochlespira bella
  - †Cochlespira columbaria
  - †Cochlespira terebralis
- †Cochlespirella
  - †Cochlespirella nana
- †Cocoaia
- Columbellopsis
  - †Columbellopsis mississippiensis
- Cominella – or unidentified comparable form
  - †Cominella pachecoi
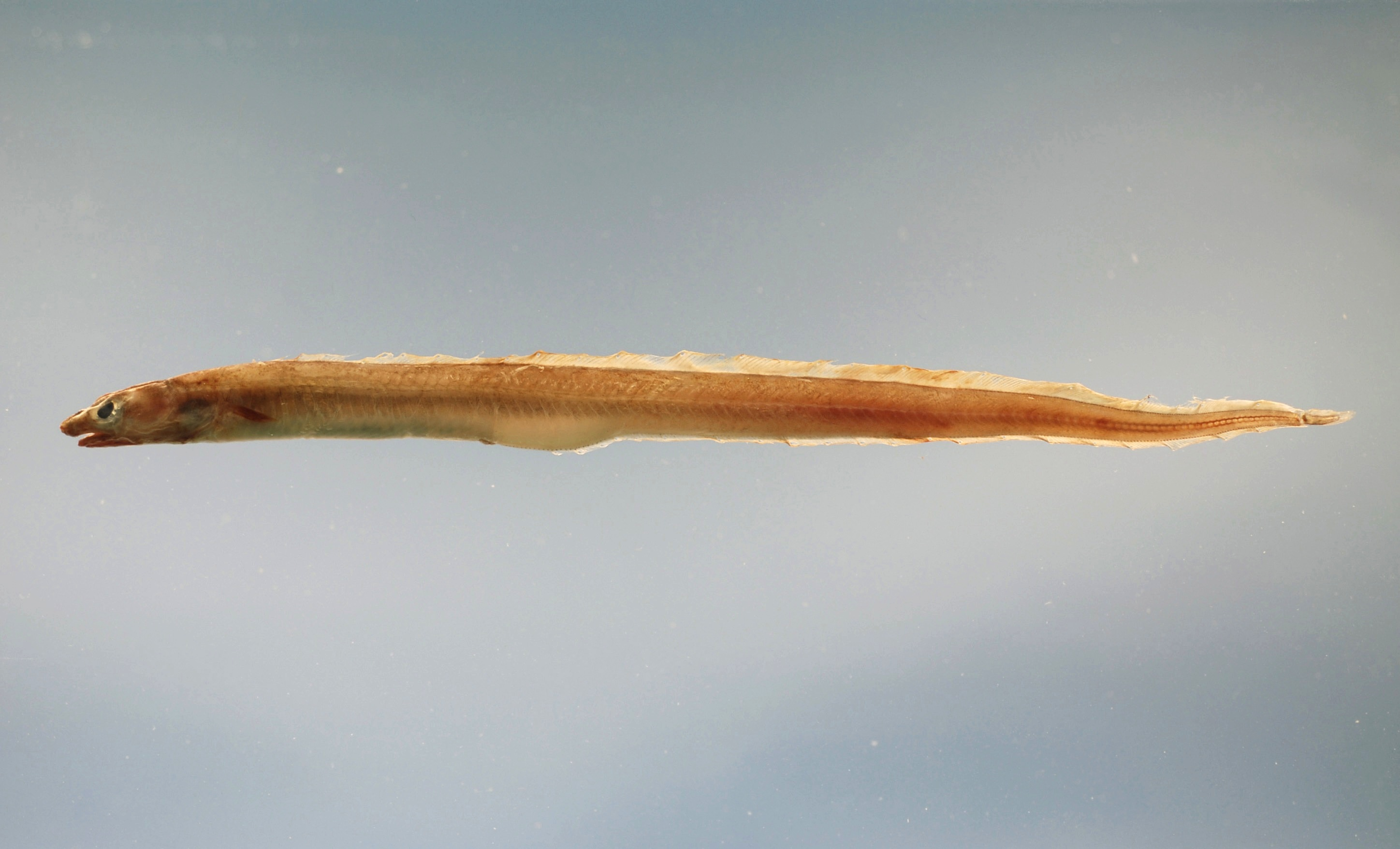
- A living Conger
  Conger
  - †Conger dissimilis
  - †Conger fornicatus
- †Congeris
  - †Congeris brevior
- Conomitra
  - †Conomitra fusoides
  - †Conomitra hammakeri
  - †Conomitra jacksonensis
  - †Conomitra texana
- Conopeum
- †Conorbis
  - †Conorbis alatoideus
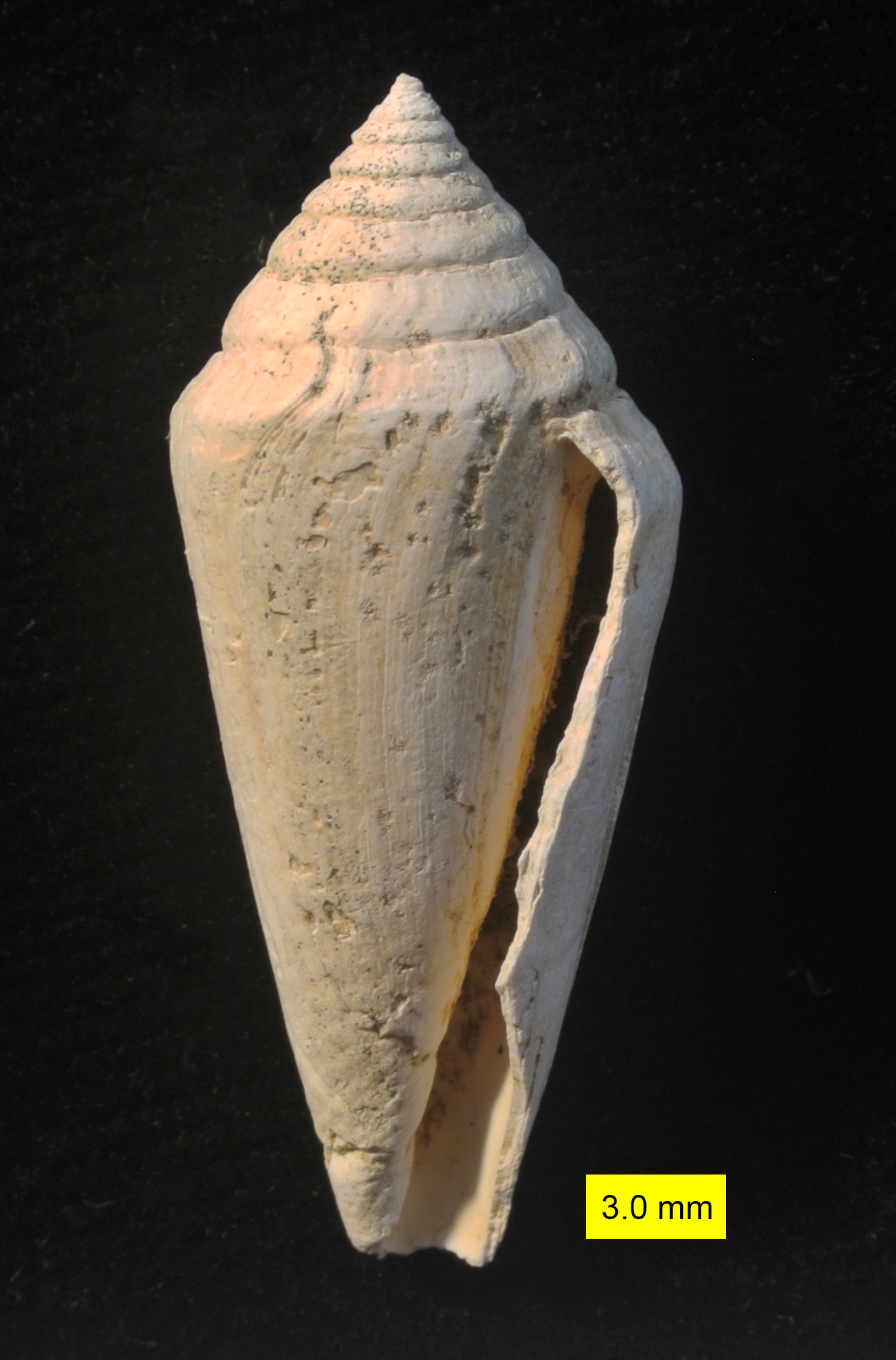
- Fossilized shell of a Conus cone snail
  Conus
  - †Conus alleni – type locality for species
  - †Conus sauridens
- †Converrucosisporites
- †Copemys
- †Coptostoma
  - †Coptostoma ulmulum
- Coralliophila
  - †Coralliophila aldrichi
- Corbula
  - †Corbula cappa
- Cordieria
  - †Cordieria ludoviciana
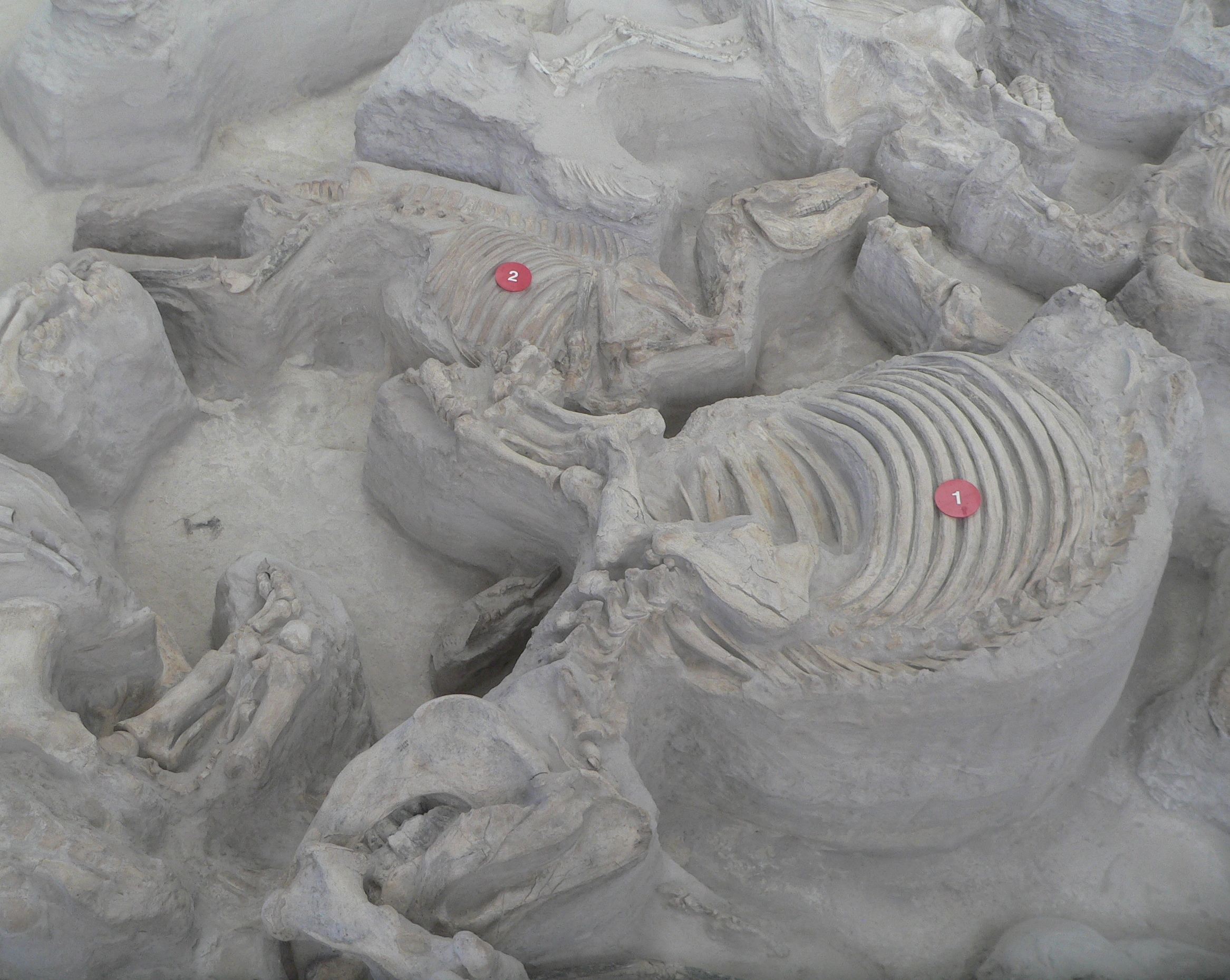
- Fossilized skeleton preserved in situ (upper left, 2) of the Miocene-Pliocene horse Cormohipparion
  †Cormohipparion
  - †Cormohipparion goorisi – or unidentified comparable form
- †Cornulina
  - †Cornulina dalli
  - †Cornulina minax
  - †Cornulina triseralis
- Cornuspira
  - †Cornuspira byramensis
- †Coronia
  - †Coronia childreni
  - †Coronia conjuncta
  - †Coronia coraliger
  - †Coronia genitiva
  - †Coronia lerchi
  - †Coronia ludonorma
  - †Coronia margaritosa
  - †Coronia montgomeryensis
  - †Coronia nodulina
  - †Coronia nucleata
  - †Coronia obsolescens
  - †Coronia parvidens
  - †Coronia plentopsis
  - †Coronia wateletella
  - †Coronia weisbordi
- Crassatella
  - †Crassatella negreetensis
  - †Crassatella texalta
  - †Crassatella trapaquara
- Crassinella
  - †Crassinella pygmaea
- Crepidula
  - †Crepidula lirata
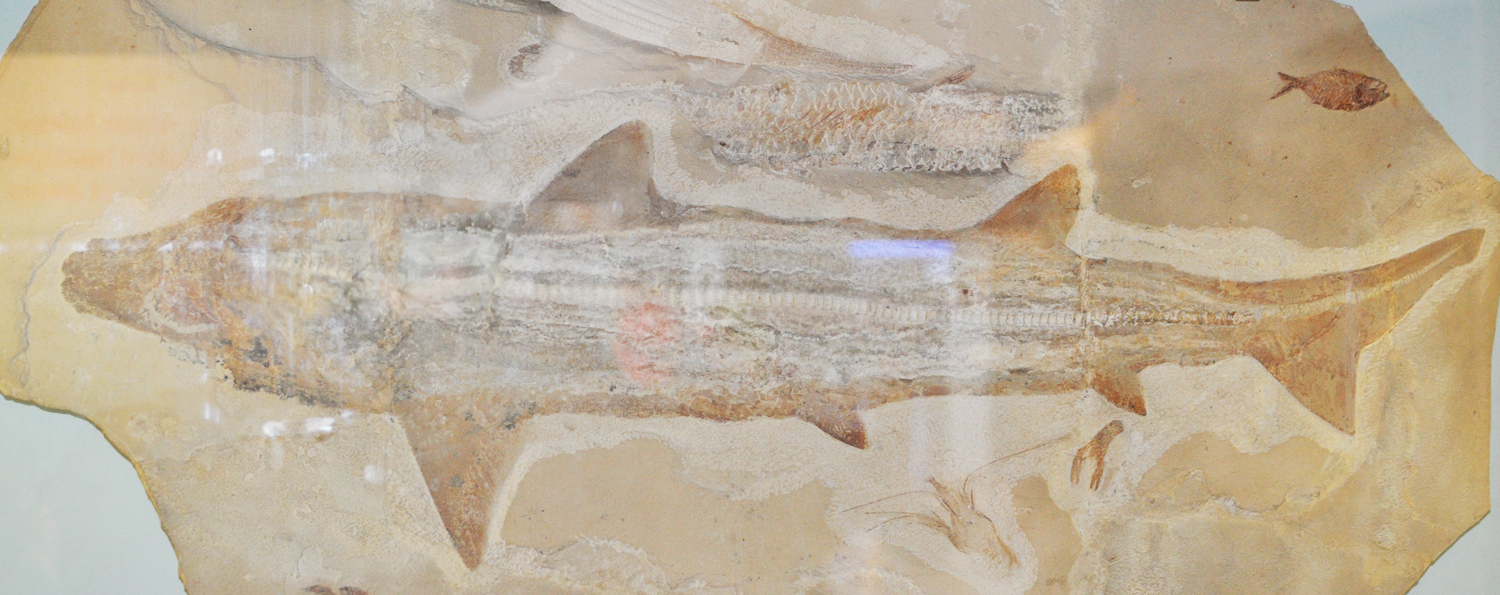
- Fossil of the Early Cretaceous-Eocene shark Cretolamna
  †Cretolamna
  - †Cretolamna lerichei
- Crocodylus
- †Cubitostrea
  - †Cubitostrea divaricata
  - †Cubitostrea lisbonensis
  - †Cubitostrea sellaeformis
- †Cupanieidites
- †Cupuliferoipollenites
- Cuspidaria
  - †Cuspidaria multiornata
- †Cyathedites
- †Cybium
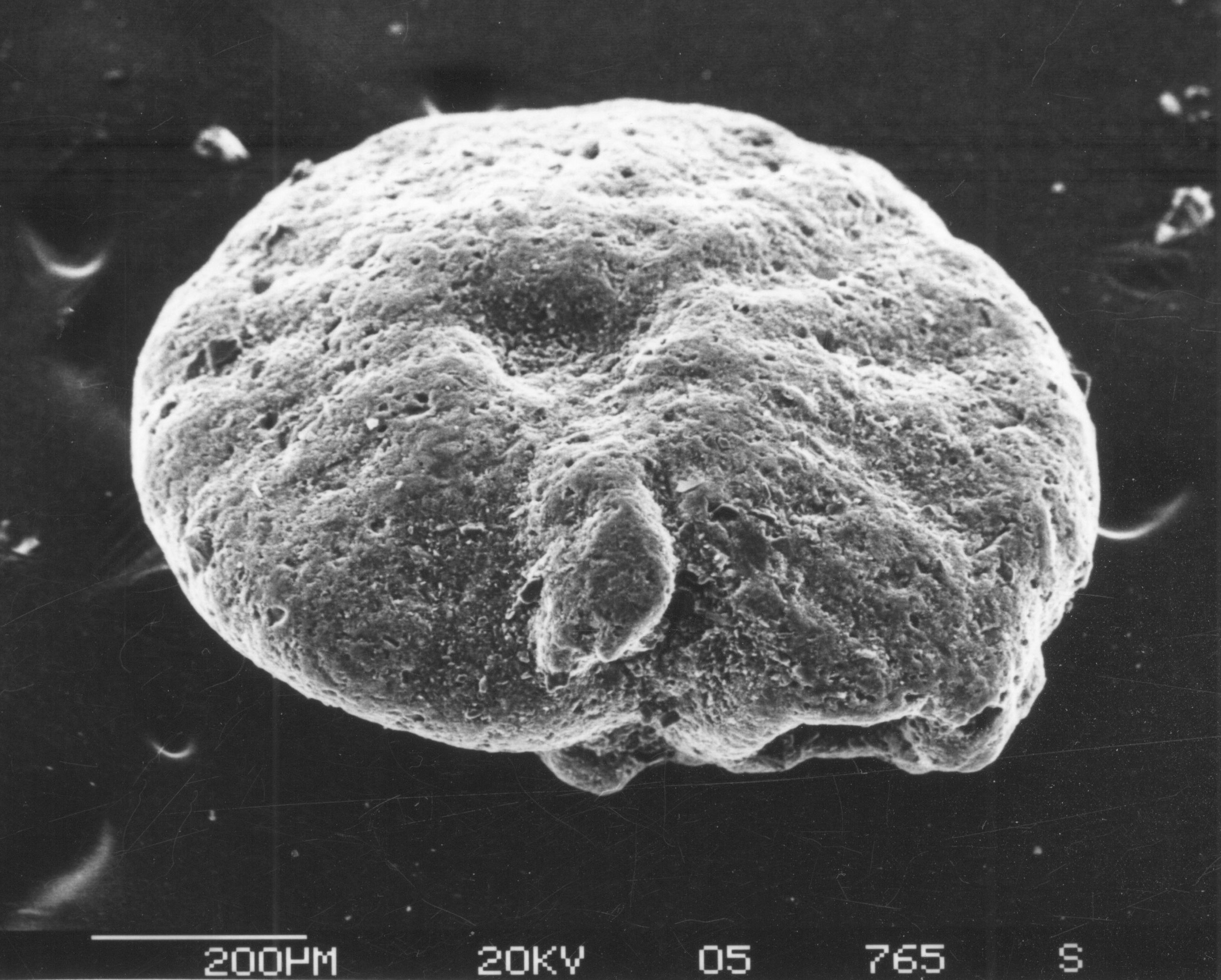
- Electron micrograph of the shell of a Cyclammina foraminiferan
  Cyclammina
  - †Cyclammina caneriverensis
- Cylichnella
  - †Cylichnella bitruncata
- †Cylindracanthus
  - †Cylindracanthus rectus
- Cymatosyrinx
  - †Cymatosyrinx dorseyi
  - †Cymatosyrinx palmerae
- †Cynarctus
- Cypraedia
  - †Cypraedia fenestralis
- †Cypraeorbis
  - †Cypraeorbis ventripotens
- Cytherella
- Cytherelloidea
  - †Cytherelloidea byramensis
  - †Cytherelloidea chawneri
- Cytheromorpha
  - †Cytheromorpha rosefieldensis

=== D ===
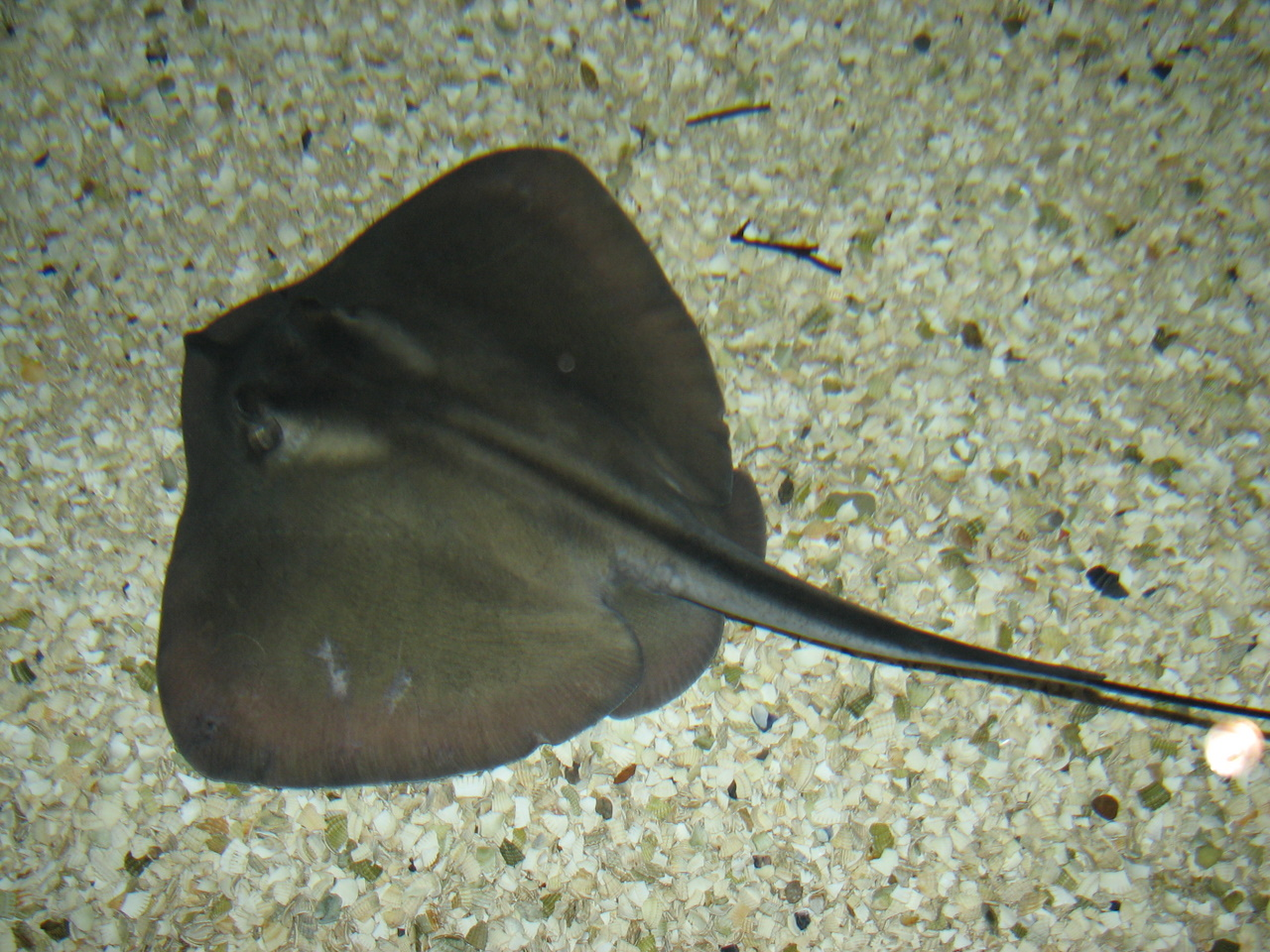
- A living Dasyatis stingray
  Dasyatis
- †Dasyostoma
  - †Dasyostoma rugostoma
- †Deltoidospora
- Dendrophyllia
  - †Dendrophyllia lisbonensis
  - †Dendrophyllia striata – type locality for species
- Dentalina
  - †Dentalina emaciata
  - †Dentalina filiformis
  - †Dentalina hantkeni
  - †Dentalina monroei
  - †Dentalina praecatesbyi
  - †Dentalina pseudoinvolons
- Dentalium
  - †Dentalium jacksonense
  - †Dentalium microstria
  - †Dentalium minutistriatum
  - †Dentalium mississippiense
- †Dicellaesporites
  - †Dicellaesporites popovii
- †Dicorbitura
  - †Dicorbitura dignata
- †Digmocyhere
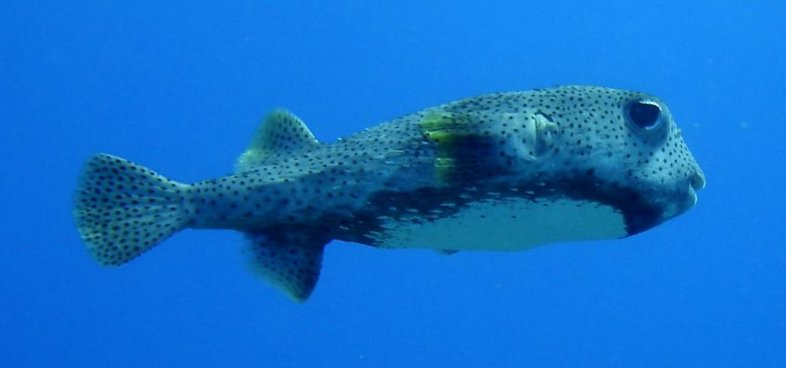
- A living Diodon, or porcupinefish
  Diodon
- Diodora
  - †Diodora alabama
  - †Diodora tenebrosa
- Diplodonta
  - †Diplodonta anterproductus
  - †Diplodonta bulla
  - †Diplodonta inflata
- †Diporicellaesporites
  - †Diporicellaesporites psilatus
  - †Diporicellaesporites reticulatus
- †Diporisporites
  - †Diporisporites type 2 informal
- †Discocyclina
  - †Discocyclina advena
- Discorbis
  - †Discorbis subaraucana
- †Discotrochus
  - †Discotrochus orbignianus
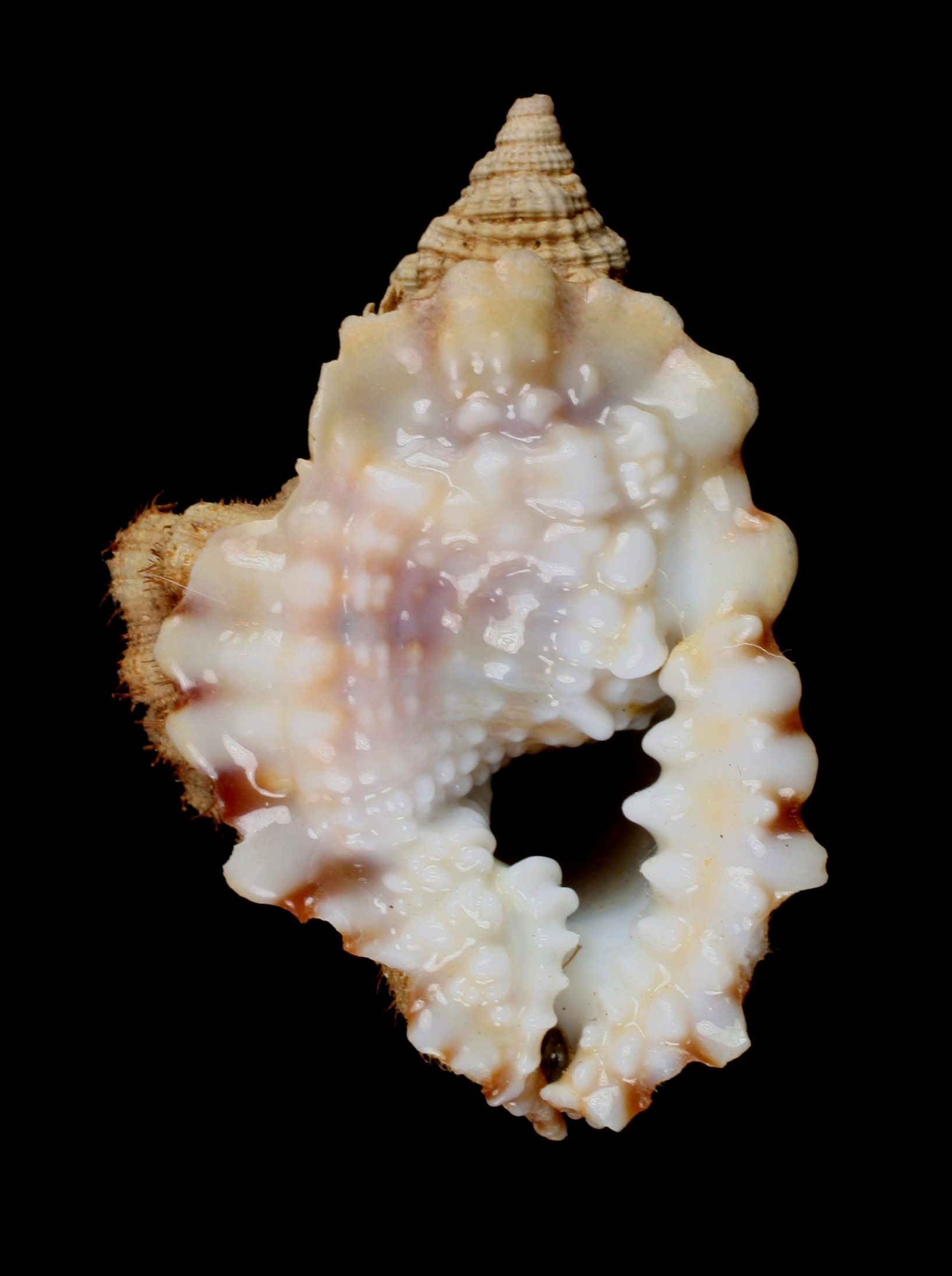
- Shell of a Distorsio sea snail
  Distorsio
- †Divisisporites
  - †Divisisporites enormis
- †Dolicholatirus
  - †Dolicholatirus leaensis
- †Dontogryphaea
  - †Dontogryphaea thirsae
- Dorsanum
  - †Dorsanum scalatum
- †Dyadosporonites
  - †Dyadosporonites schwabii
- †Dyseohyus

=== E ===
- †Eburneopecten
  - †Eburneopecten corneoides
  - †Eburneopecten scintillatus
- Echinocythereis
  - †Echinocythereis mcguirti
- †Ectinochilus
  - †Ectinochilus stenzeli
- †Edaphocyon – tentative report
- †Ekokenia
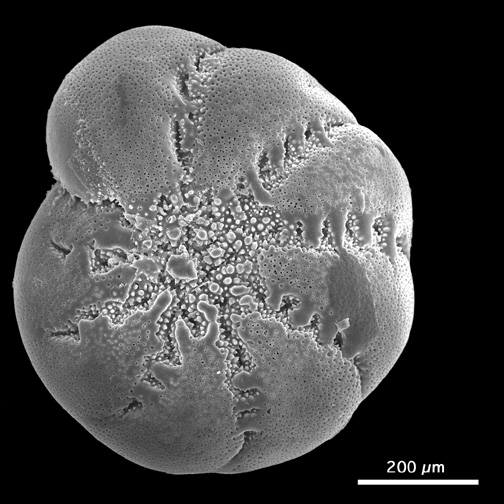
- Test of Elphidium, an Eocene to modern foraminiferan
  Elphidium
  - †Elphidium latispatium
- Endopachys
  - †Endopachys lonsdalei
  - †Endopachys maclurii
- Entosolenia
  - †Entosolenia orbignyana
- †Eocithara
  - †Eocithara jacksonensis
- †Eoclathurella
  - †Eoclathurella jacksonica
  - †Eoclathurella obesula
- †Eodrilla
  - †Eodrilla lonsdalei
  - †Eodrilla lonsdallii
- †Eodrillia
  - †Eodrillia texana
- Eoeponidella
  - †Eoeponidella meyerhoffi
- †Eophysema
  - †Eophysema ozarkana
- †Eopleurotoma
  - †Eopleurotoma carya
  - †Eopleurotoma gemmaria
  - †Eopleurotoma ouachitensis
  - †Eopleurotoma plumbella
  - †Eopleurotoma sabinaria
- †Eosurcula
  - †Eosurcula moorei
  - †Eosurcula sanctimauritii
- †Ephedripites
  - †Ephedripites voluta
- Epistominella
  - †Epistominella danvillensis
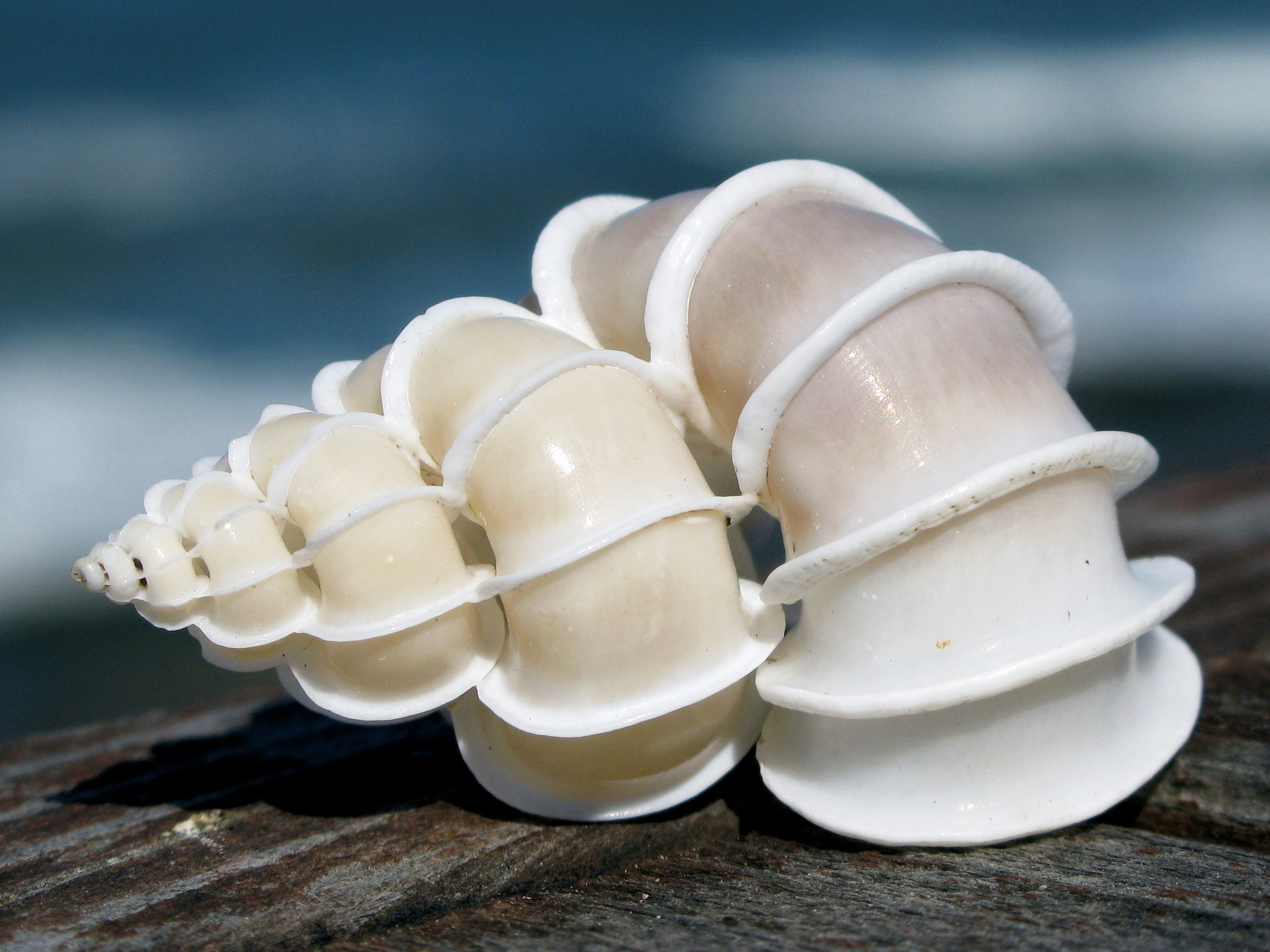
- Shell of an Epitonium wentletrap sea snail
  Epitonium
  - †Epitonium kingae
  - †Epitonium multiliniferum
  - †Epitonium unilineata
- Eponides
  - †Eponides byramensis
- Equus
  - †Equus complicatus
  - †Equus fraternus
  - †Equus intermedius – type locality for species
- †Ericipites
- †Eucheilodon
  - †Eucheilodon crenocarinata
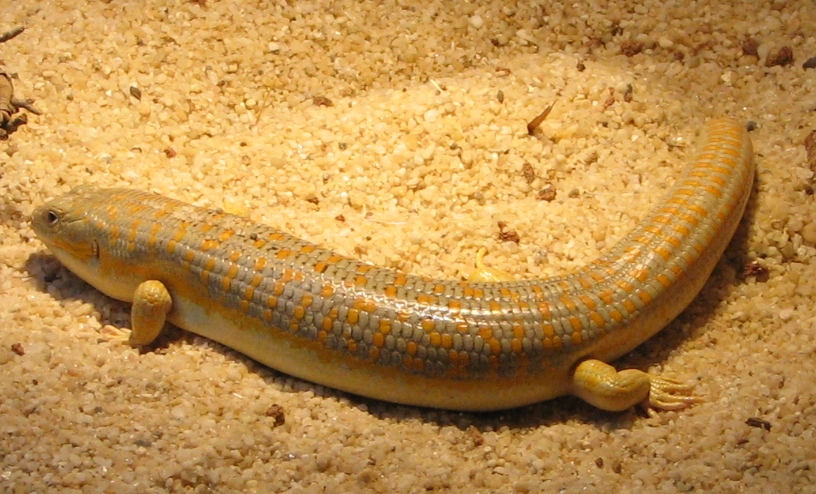
- A living Eumeces skink
  Eumeces
- Eurytellina
  - †Eurytellina linifera
- †Euscalpellum
  - †Euscalpellum eocenense
- Euspira
  - †Euspira jacksonensis
- †Expressipollis
- †Extratriporopollenites

=== F ===
- Falsifusus
  - †Falsifusus bastropensis
  - †Falsifusus harrisi
  - †Falsifusus ludlovicianus
- †Favitricolporites
  - †Favitricolporites baculoferous
- †Ficopsis
  - †Ficopsis penita
  - †Ficopsis texana
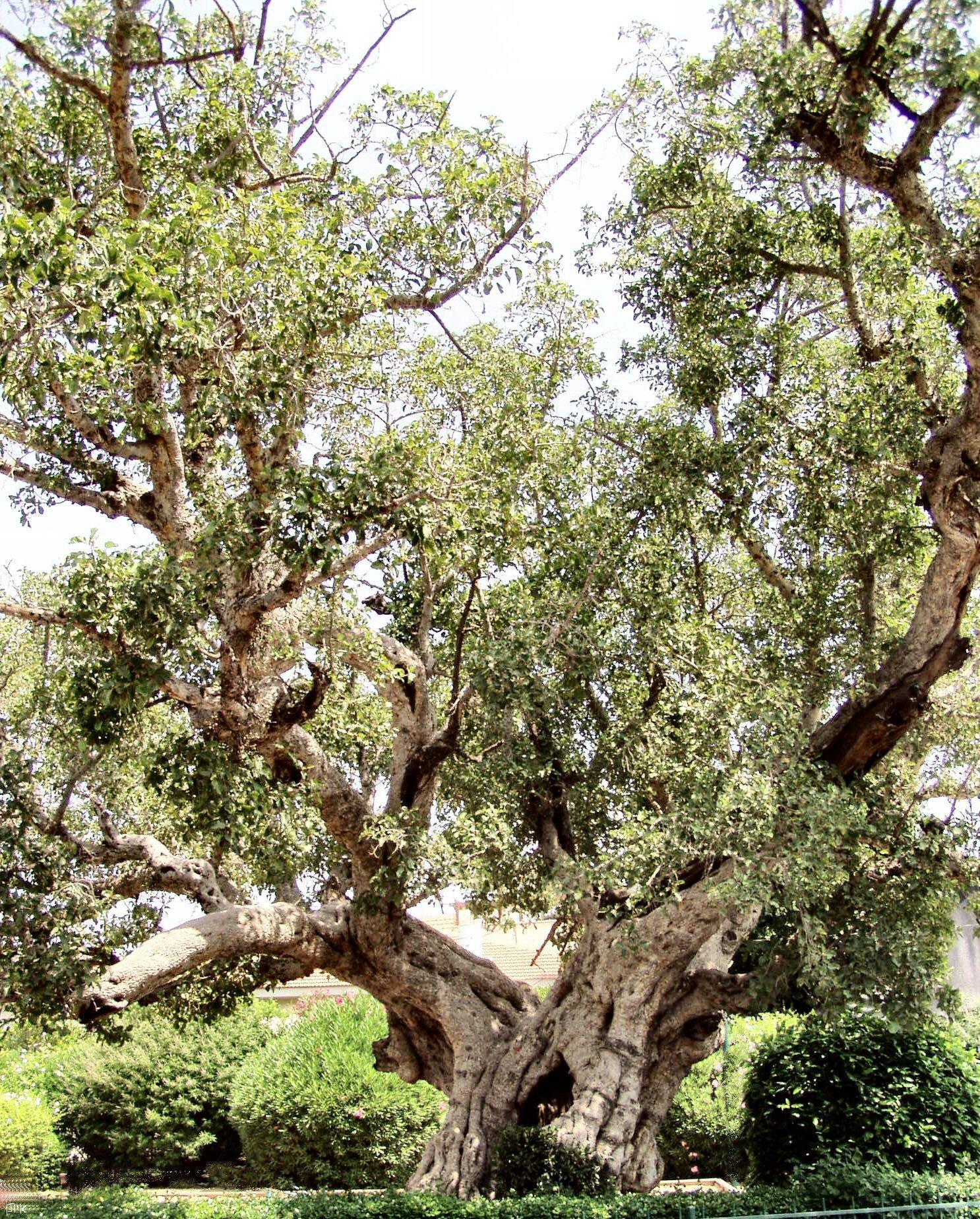
- A living Ficus, or fig tree
  Ficus
  - †Ficus filia
  - †Ficus merita
- Fissurella
  - †Fissurella alabama
- Flabellum
  - †Flabellum cuneifome
  - †Flabellum cuneiforme
  - †Flabellum lerchi – type locality for species
  - †Flabellum wailesii
- †Frizzellithus
  - †Frizzellithus gemma
- Fursenkoina
  - †Fursenkoina punctata
- †Fusiformisporites
  - †Fusiformisporites crabbii
- Fusimitra
  - †Fusimitra millingtoni
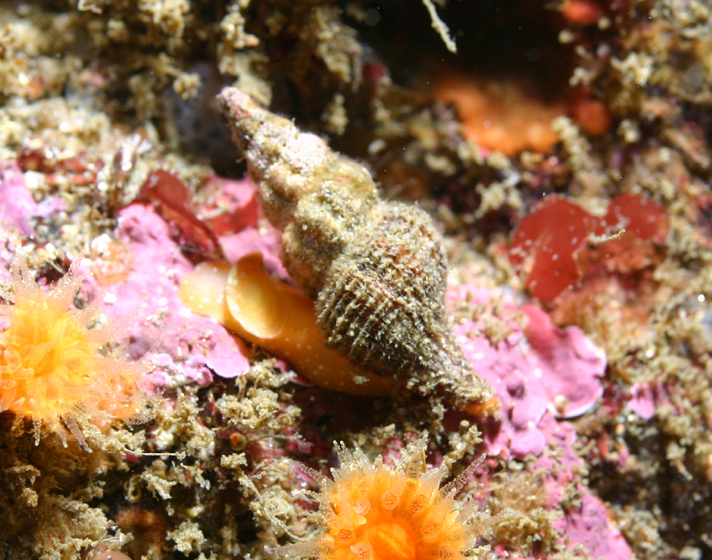
- A living Fusinus sea snail
  Fusinus
  - †Fusinus insectoides
- †Fusitoma
  - †Fusitoma sipha
- Fustiaria
  - †Fustiaria danai

=== G ===
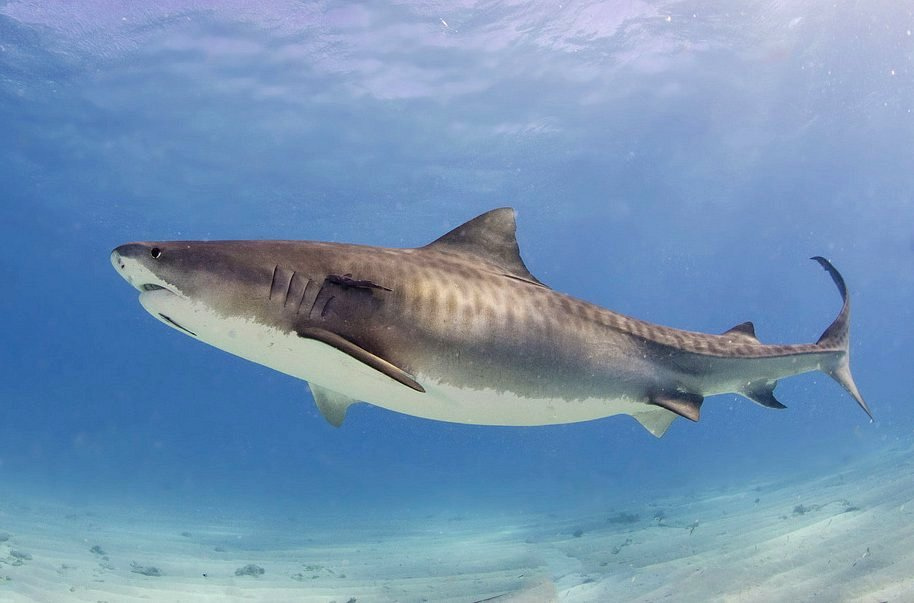
- A living Galeocerdo requiem shark
  Galeocerdo
  - †Galeocerdo alabamensis
  - †Galeocerdo clarkensis
  - †Galeocerdo contortus
- Galeodea
  - †Galeodea koureos
  - †Galeodea planotecta
- Galeorhinus
  - †Galeorhinus huberensis
- Gari
  - †Gari jacksonensis
- Gegania
  - †Gegania antiquata
- Genota
  - †Genota heilprini
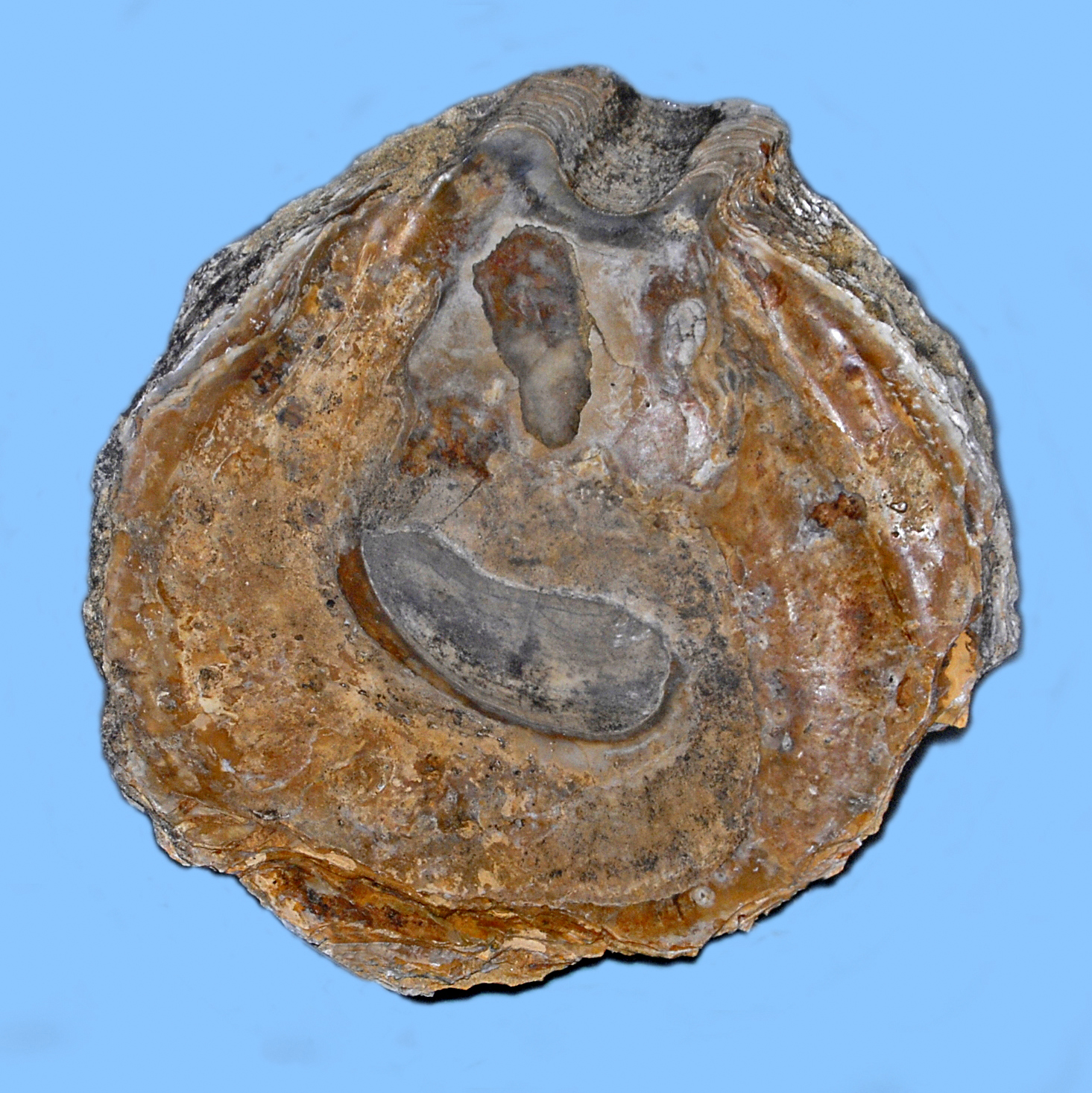
- Fossilized shell of the Eocene-Miocene foam oyster Gigantostrea
  †Gigantostrea
  - †Gigantostrea trigonalis
- Ginglymostoma
  - †Ginglymostoma serra
- †Gleicheniidites
- Globigerina
  - †Globigerina ouachitaensis
- Globobulimina
  - †Globobulimina pyrula
- Globorotalia
  - †Globorotalia centralis
  - †Globorotalia cerroazulensis
- Globulina
  - †Globulina gibba
- Glycymeris
  - †Glycymeris filosa
  - †Glycymeris idonea
  - †Glycymeris trigonella
- Glyptoactis
  - †Glyptoactis alticostata – or unidentified comparable form
  - †Glyptoactis complexicosta
  - †Glyptoactis trapaquara
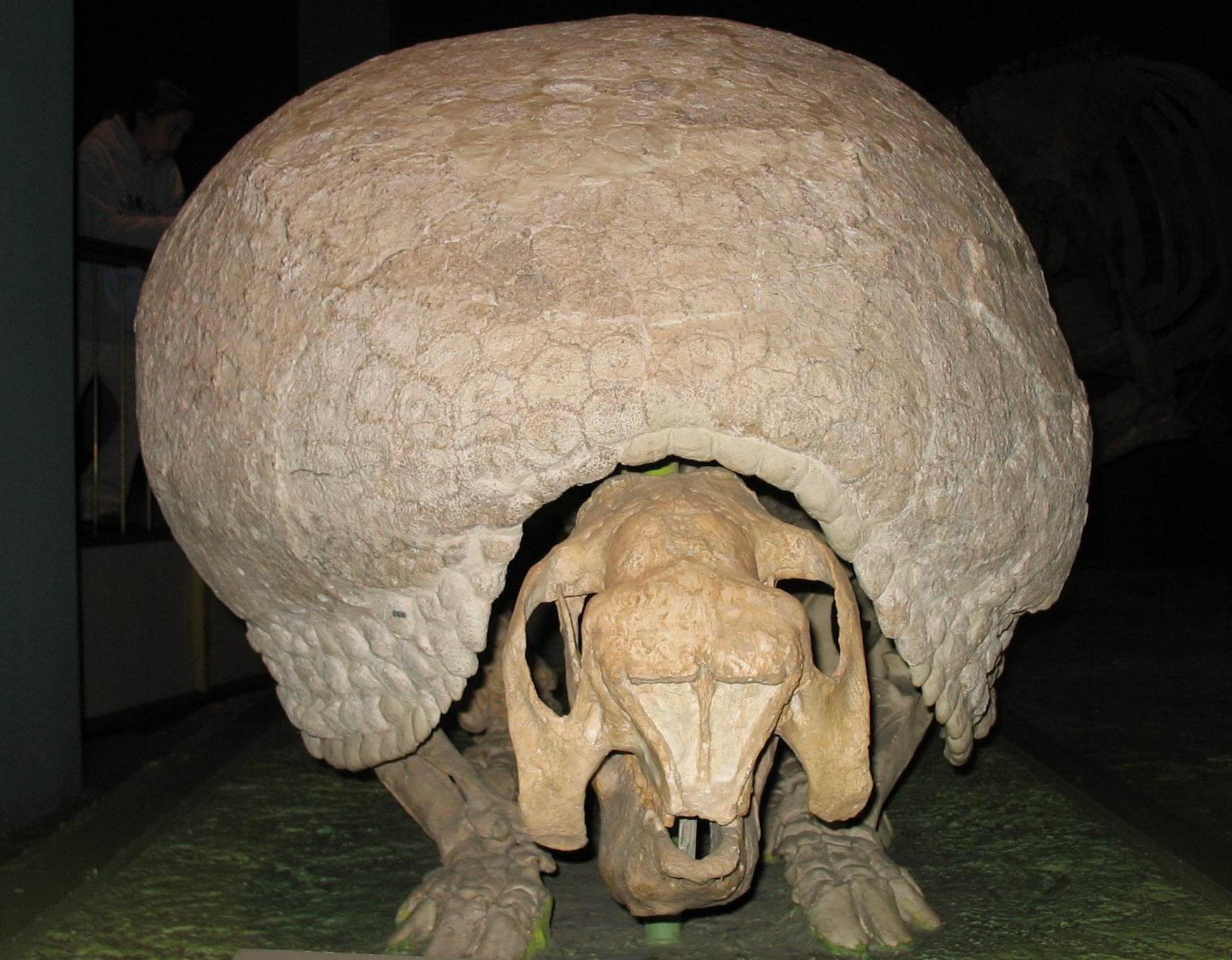
- Mounted fossilized skeleton of the Pleistocene armadillo relative Glyptotherium
  †Glyptotherium
  - †Glyptotherium floridanum – or unidentified comparable form
- †Glyptotoma
  - †Glyptotoma crassiplicata
  - †Glyptotoma fisherana
- Gnathophis
  - †Gnathophis dissimilis
- †Gomphotherium
- Guttulina
  - †Guttulina austriaca
  - †Guttulina byramensis
- Gyroidina
  - †Gyroidina danvillensis
  - †Gyroidina vicksburgensis
- Gyroidinoides
  - †Gyroidinoides danvillensis

=== H ===
- †Haimesiastraea
  - †Haimesiastraea conferta
- †Hamulatisporites
  - †Hamulatisporites amplus
- Hanzawaia
  - †Hanzawaia mauricensis
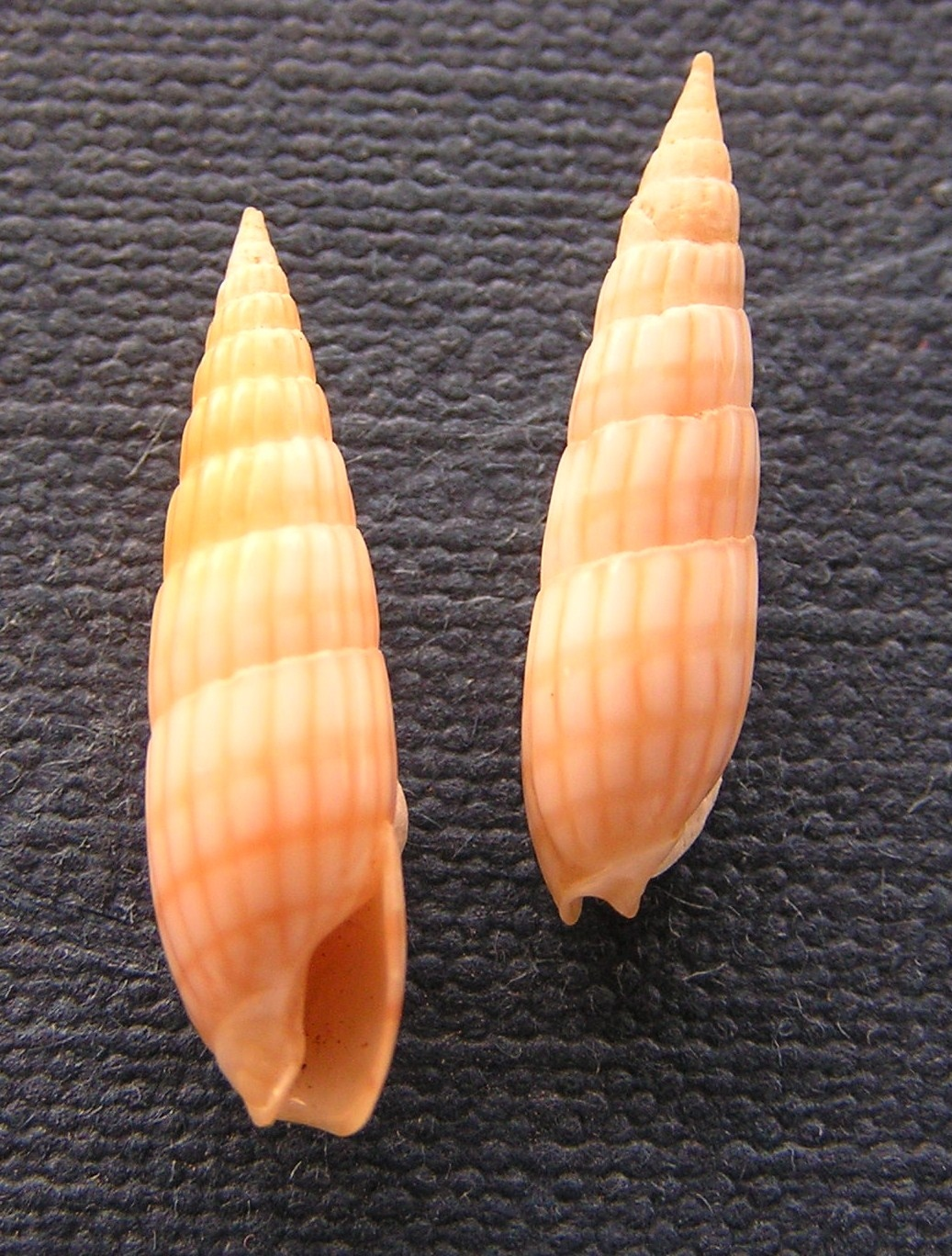
- Shells in differing orientations of Hastula augur sea snails
  Hastula
  - †Hastula houstonia
- Haustator
  - †Haustator carinata
  - †Haustator perdita
  - †Haustator rina
- Hemipristis
  - †Hemipristis curvatus
  - †Hemipristis wyattdurhami
- Hemisinus
  - †Hemisinus jacksonius
- †Hemisurcula
  - †Hemisurcula silicata
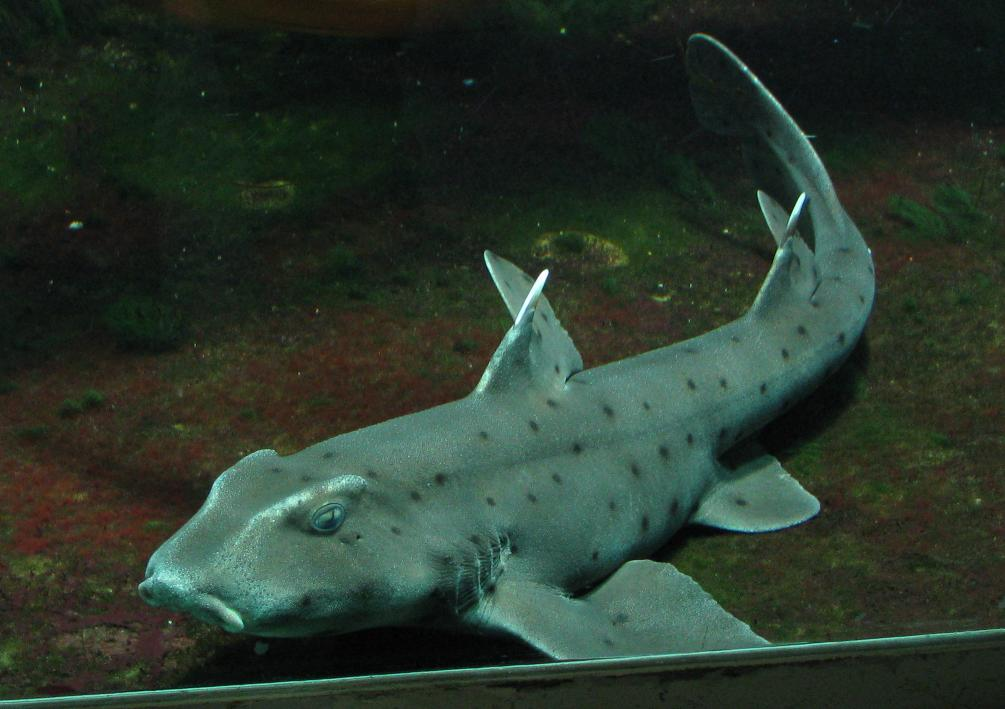
- A living Heterodontus, or bullhead shark
  Heterodontus
  - †Heterodontus pineti
- Heterostegina
- Hexaplex
  - †Hexaplex katherinae
  - †Hexaplex marksi
  - †Hexaplex silvaticus
  - †Hexaplex supernus
- †Hilgardia
  - †Hilgardia multilineata
- Hipponix
  - †Hipponix pygmaea
  - †Hipponix pygmaeus
- †Homomya
  - †Homomya hamatoides
- Hoplopteron
  - †Hoplopteron elegans
- †Hypolagus – or unidentified comparable form
- †Hypoxylon

=== I ===
- †Ilexpollenites
- †Inapertisporites
- †Inaperturopollenites
- †Infracoronia
  - †Infracoronia ludoviciana
- †Involutisporites
- †Involutisporonites
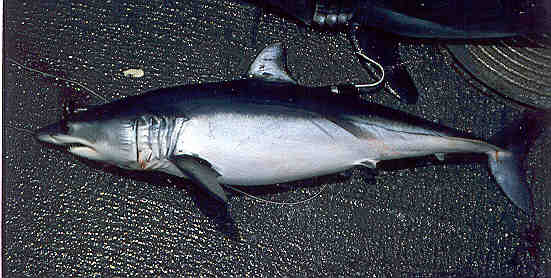
- A modern Isurus, or mako shark
  Isurus
  - †Isurus praecursor

=== J ===
- †Jefitchia
  - †Jefitchia claybornensis
- †Jonus
  - †Jonus tortilis
- Jugosocythereis

=== K ===
- †Kapalmerella
  - †Kapalmerella alveata
  - †Kapalmerella arenicola
  - †Kapalmerella mortoni
  - †Kapalmerella pleboides
- Kelliella
  - †Kelliella boettgeri
- †Kyandopollenites
  - †Kyandopollenites anneratus

=== L ===
- †Lacrimasporonites
  - †Lacrimasporonites basidii
- Lactarius
- †Laevigatosporites
- Lagena
  - †Lagena hexagona
- Lamarckina
  - †Lamarckina byramensis
  - †Lamarckina claibornse
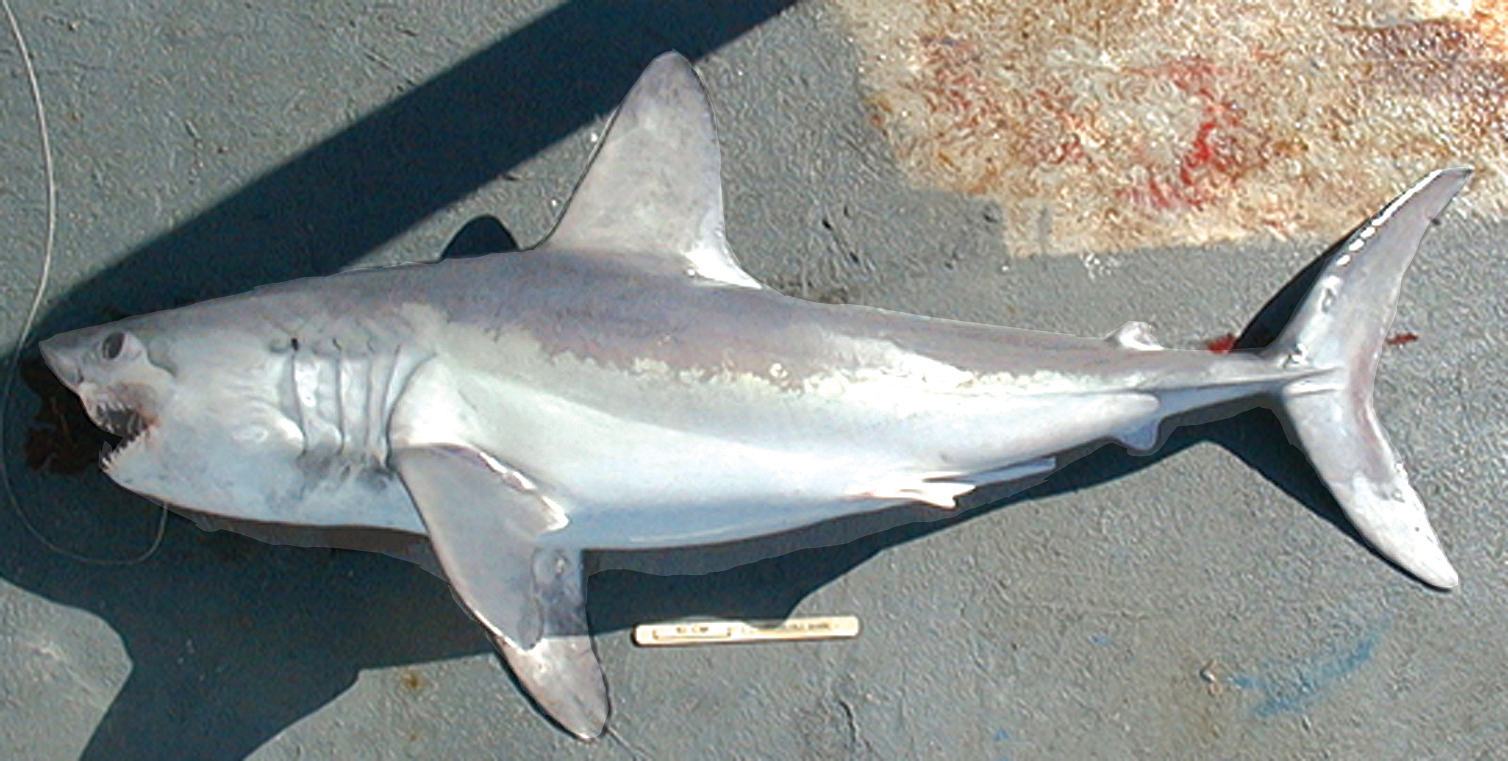
- A modern Lamna mackerel shark
  Lamna
  - †Lamna lerichi
- †Lapparia
  - †Lapparia cancellata
  - †Lapparia dumosa
  - †Lapparia mooreana
- Latirus
  - †Latirus humilior
  - †Latirus moorei
  - †Latirus tortillis
- †Leiotriletes
- Lenticulina
  - †Lenticulina catahoulaensis
  - †Lenticulina cultrata
  - †Lenticulina danvillensis
  - †Lenticulina rotulata
  - †Lenticulina vicksburgensis
- †Lepidocyclina
  - †Lepidocyclina supera
- †Levifusus
  - †Levifusus branneri
  - †Levifusus fulguriparens
  - †Levifusus identus
  - †Levifusus mortoniopsis
  - †Levifusus pagodiformis
  - †Levifusus prepagoda
  - †Levifusus supraplanus
  - †Levifusus trabeatus
- †Liliacidites
- Lima
- †Limnoecus
  - †Limnoecus niobrarensis
- Limopsis
  - †Limopsis aviculoides
  - †Limopsis radiata
- †Linthia
  - †Linthia hollandi – type locality for species
- †Liquidambarpollenites
- †Lirodiscus
  - †Lirodiscus jacksonensis
  - †Lirodiscus pretriangulata
  - †Lirodiscus smithvillensis
- †Lirofusus
  - †Lirofusus thoracicus
- †Lithophysema
  - †Lithophysema grande
- †Litorhadia
  - †Litorhadia albirupina – tentative report
  - †Litorhadia compsa
  - †Litorhadia mater
- Loxoconcha
  - †Loxoconcha woodwordensis
- Lucina
  - †Lucina atoma
  - †Lucina perminuta
- Lunulites
  - †Lunulites bassleri
- †Lusatisporites
- †Lycopodiumsporites
- †Lyrosurcula
  - †Lyrosurcula acuta
  - †Lyrosurcula columbiana
  - †Lyrosurcula dalli
  - †Lyrosurcula elegans
  - †Lyrosurcula obsoleta
  - †Lyrosurcula shaleri

=== M ===
- Macrocallista
- Madracis
  - †Madracis ganei – type locality for species
  - †Madracis gregorioi
- Madrepora
  - †Madrepora natchitochensis – type locality for species
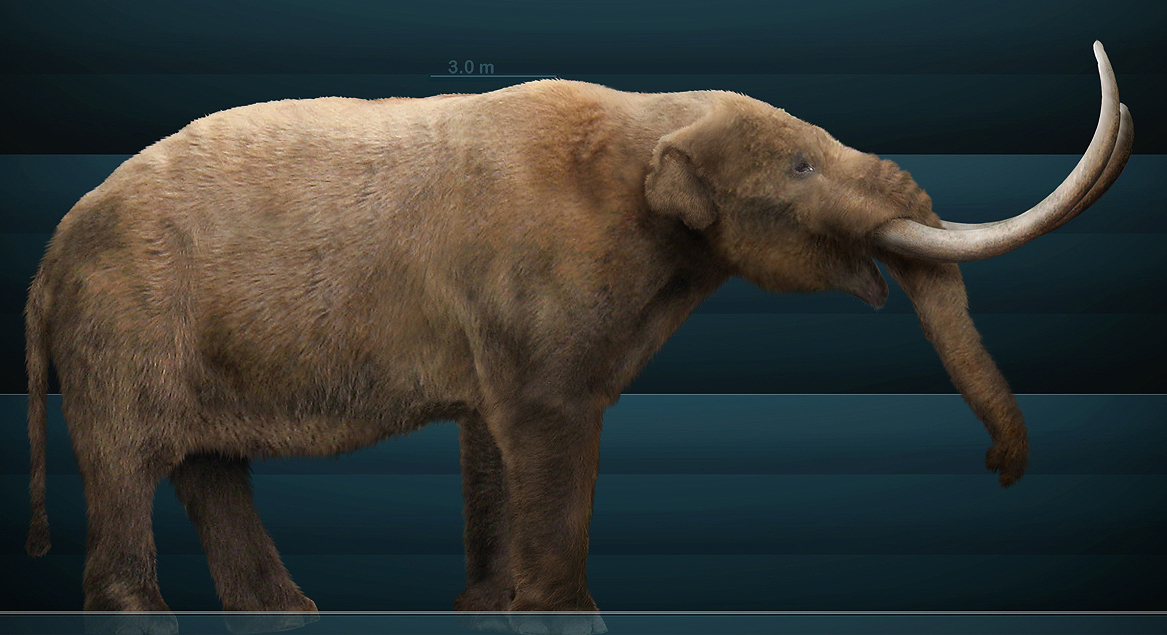
- Restoration of a Mammut americanum, or American mastodon
  †Mammut
- †Margaritaria
  - †Margaritaria inexpectens
- Marginella
  - †Marginella constrictoides
- Marginulina
  - †Marginulina variata
- Marginulinopsis
  - †Marginulinopsis fragaria
- †Margocolporites
  - †Margocolporites kruschii
- Martesia
- Massilina
  - †Massilina pratti
- †Mauricia
  - †Mauricia houstonia
- †Mazzalina
  - †Mazzalina plena
- Melanella
  - †Melanella jacksonensis
  - †Melanella wheeleri
- Melonis
  - †Melonis planatum
- Meretrix
  - †Meretrix nuttalliopsis
  - †Meretrix nuttelliopsis
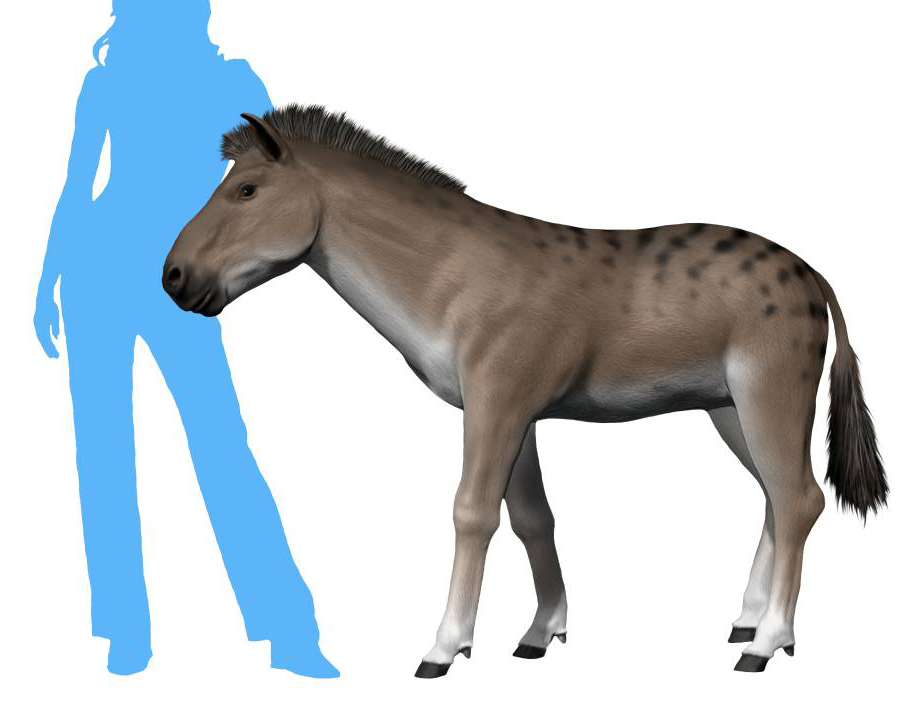
- Life restoration of the Miocene three-toed horse Merychippus
  †Merychippus
  - †Merychippus gunteri
- †Merychyus
- Mesalia
  - †Mesalia claibornensis
  - †Mesalia vetusta
- Metula
  - †Metula johnsoni
  - †Metula subgracilis
- †Michela
  - †Michela trabeatoides
- Microdrillia
  - †Microdrillia minutissima
  - †Microdrillia ouachitae
  - †Microdrillia robustula
- †Microfoveolatosporis
  - †Microfoveolatosporis pseudodentatus
- †Microfoveolatosporites
- †Microreticulatisporites
- Miltha
  - †Miltha gaufia
- †Miomustela
- Mitrella
  - †Mitrella alabamensis
  - †Mitrella casteri
  - †Mitrella parva
- Mnestia
  - †Mnestia dekayi
  - †Mnestia meyeri
- Modiolus
- †Momipites
- †Monoporisporites
- †Monoptygma
  - †Monoptygma crassiplicum
- †Morozovella
  - †Morozovella aragonensis
- †Multicellaesporites
- Myliobatis
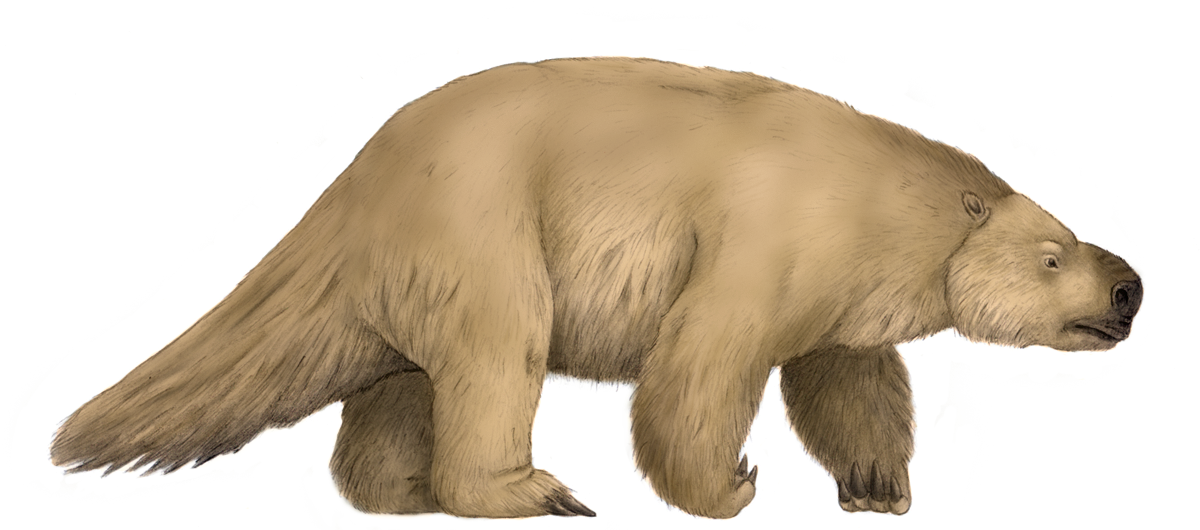
- Life restoration of the Pleistocene-Holocene ground sloth Mylodon with an inset depicting its excrement and a skin fragment
  †Mylodon
  - †Mylodon harlanii
- †Myripistis
- Myripristis
- Myrtea
  - †Myrtea curta

=== N ===
- †Nannipus
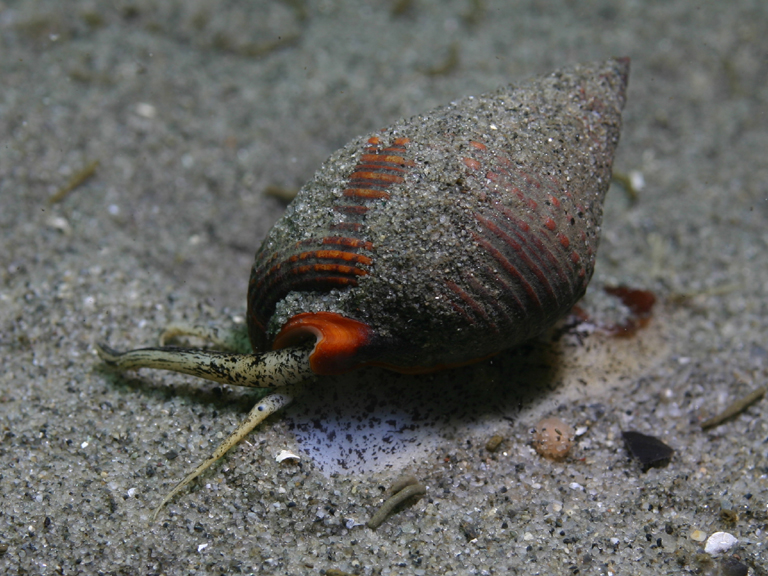
- A living Nassarius, or nassa mud snail
  Nassarius
  - †Nassarius albirupina
  - †Nassarius exilis
  - †Nassarius hilli
  - †Nassarius jacksonensis
  - †Nassarius magnocostata
- †Natchitochia – type locality for genus
  - †Natchitochia jonesi – type locality for species
- Natica
  - †Natica aperta
  - †Natica permunda
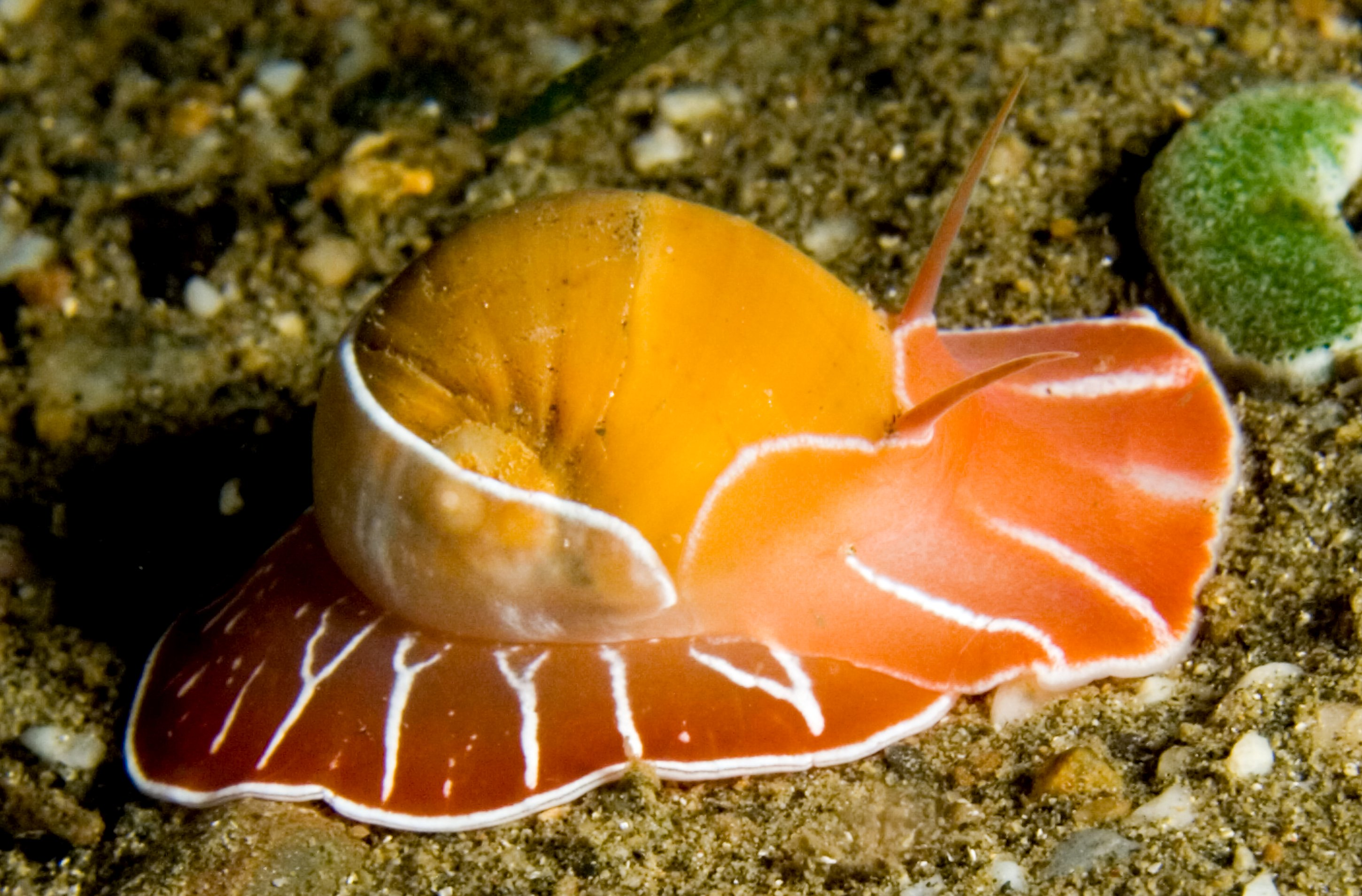
- A living Naticarius moon sea snail
  Naticarius – or unidentified comparable form
  - †Naticarius semilunata
- Nemocardium
  - †Nemocardium gambrinum
  - †Nemocardium nicoletti
  - †Nemocardium nicolletti
  - †Nemocardium salrivale
- †Neobythitinarum – report made of unidentified related form or using admittedly obsolete nomenclature
  - †Neobythitinarum meyeri
- †Neobythitinorum – report made of unidentified related form or using admittedly obsolete nomenclature
  - †Neobythitinorum meyeri
- †Neoepenoides
  - †Neoepenoides antillarum
- †Neozanthopsis
  - †Neozanthopsis americana
- Neverita
  - †Neverita limula
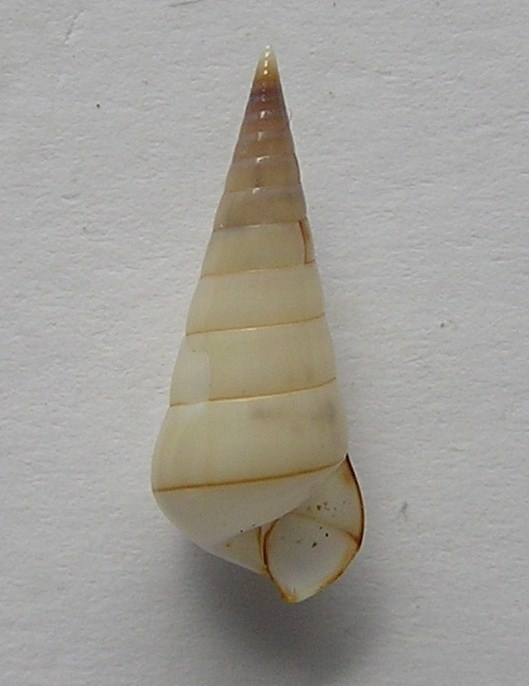
- Shell of a Niso sea snail
  Niso
- Nodosaria
  - †Nodosaria pyrula
  - †Nodosaria vertebralis
- Nonion
  - †Nonion advenum
  - †Nonion alabamense
  - †Nonion decoratum
- Nonionella
  - †Nonionella hantkeni
  - †Nonionella jacksonensis
  - †Nonionella tatumi
- †Nototamias
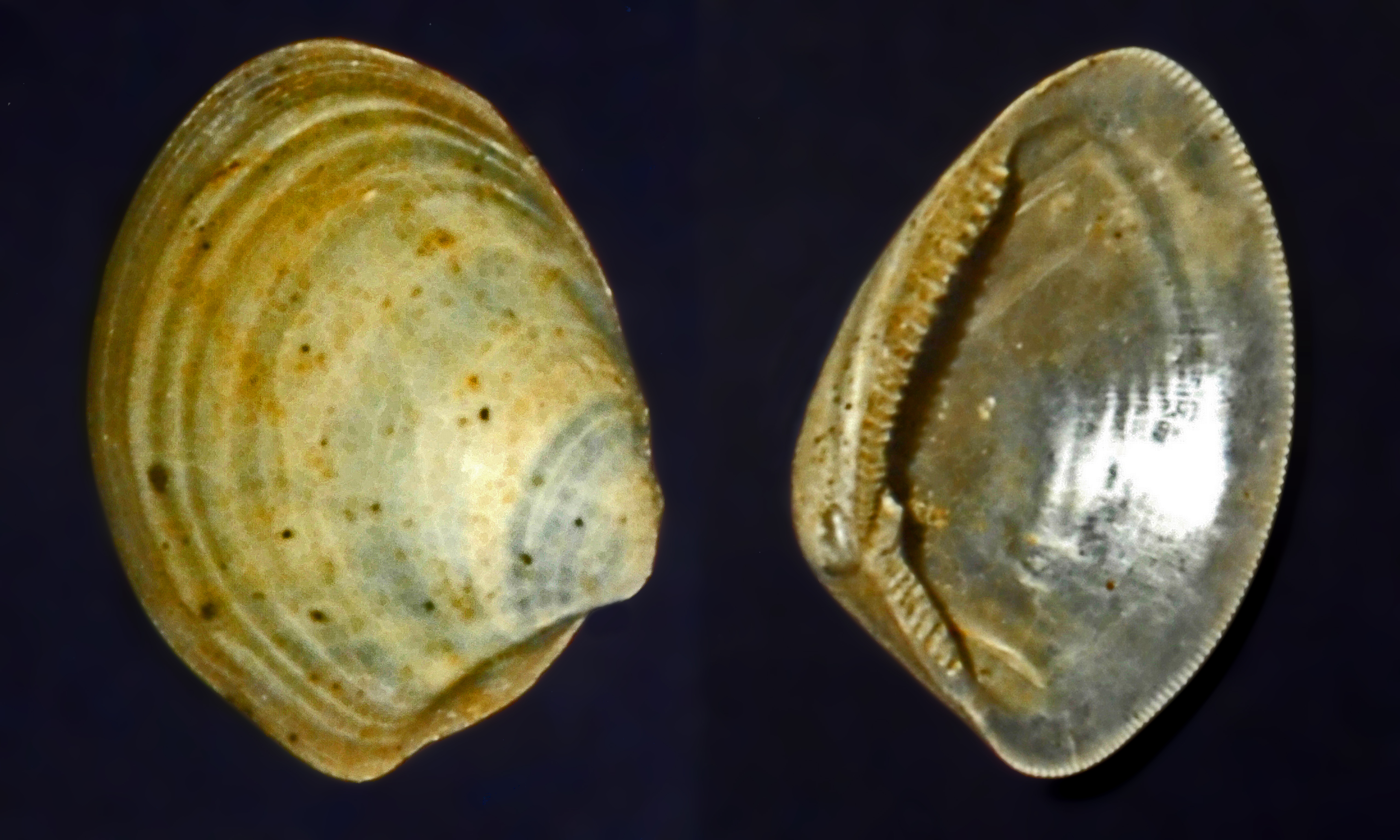
- Interior of a fossilized shell of the Early Ordovician-modern marine bivalve Nucula
  Nucula
  - †Nucula magnifica
  - †Nucula mauricensis
  - †Nucula ovula
  - †Nucula smithvillensis – or unidentified comparable form
  - †Nucula sphenopsis
  - †Nucula yazooensis
- Nuculana
  - †Nuculana corpulentoidea
  - †Nuculana fiski – type locality for species
  - †Nuculana magna
  - †Nuculana ovula
  - †Nuculana wautubbeana
- †Nudopollis
  - †Nudopollis terminalis
  - †Nudopollis theirgartii – or unidentified related form

=== O ===
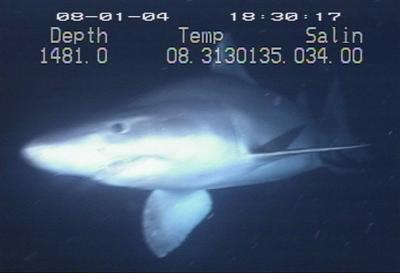
- A living Odontaspis sand shark
  Odontaspis
  - †Odontaspis hopei
- †Odontogryphaea
  - †Odontogryphaea thirsae
- †Odontopolys
  - †Odontopolys compsorhytis
- Odostomia
  - †Odostomia trapaquara
- Operculina
- †Ophichthyidarum – report made of unidentified related form or using admittedly obsolete nomenclature
  - †Ophichthyidarum brevior
- Orthopristis
- †Orthosurcula
  - †Orthosurcula adeona – or unidentified related form
  - †Orthosurcula indenta
  - †Orthosurcula longipersa
  - †Orthosurcula persa
- Orthoyoldia
  - †Orthoyoldia kindlei
  - †Orthoyoldia psammotaea
- †Osmundacidites
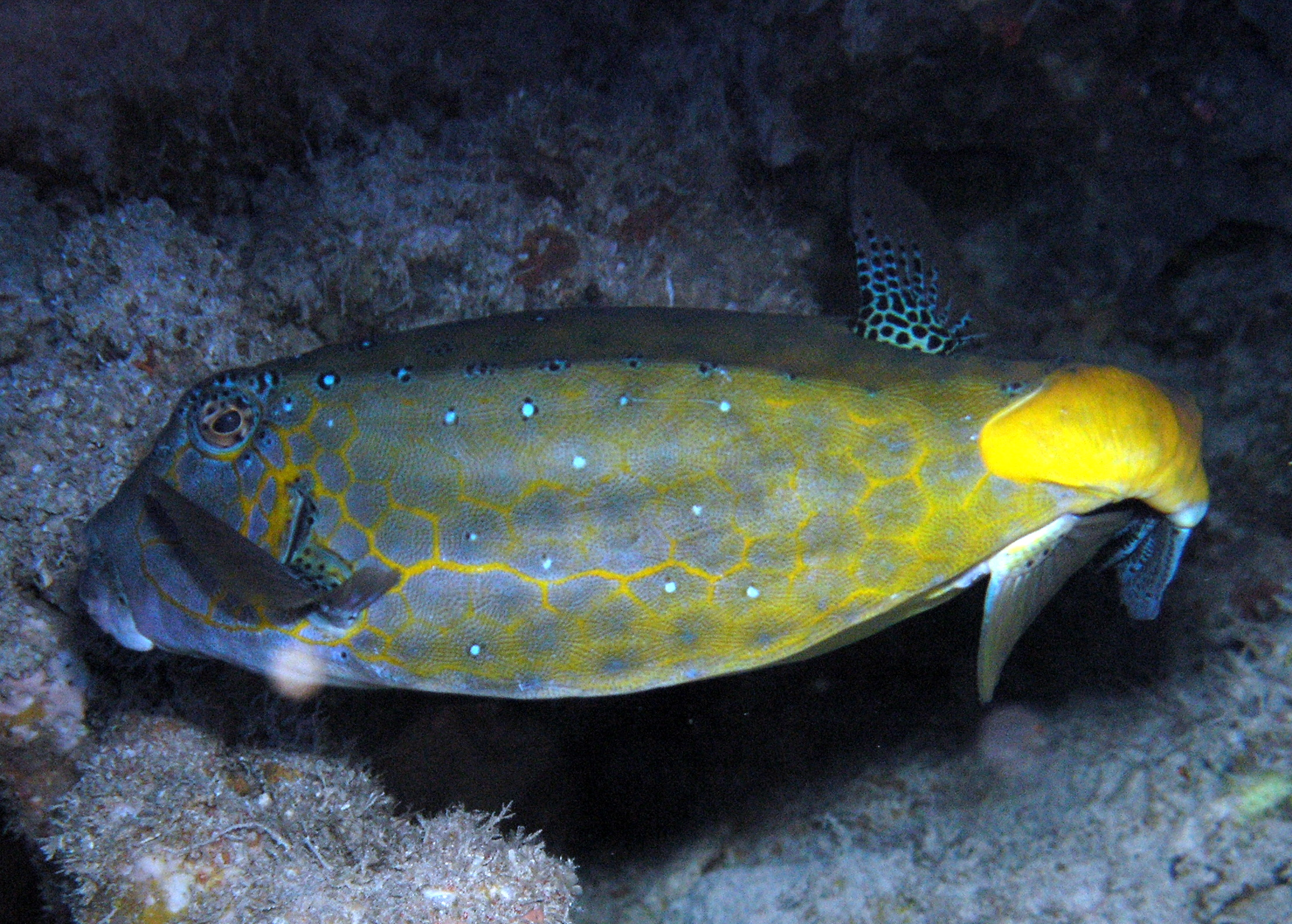
- A living Ostracion boxfish
  †Ostracion
  - †Ostracion meretrix
- Ostrea
  - †Ostrea compressirostra – or unidentified comparable form
  - †Ostrea crenulimarginata
  - †Ostrea falco
  - †Ostrea multilirata
  - †Ostrea sylvaerupis
- Otionella
- †Ovoidites

=== P ===
- †Pachecoa
  - †Pachecoa decisa
  - †Pachecoa ellipsis
  - †Pachecoa pulchra
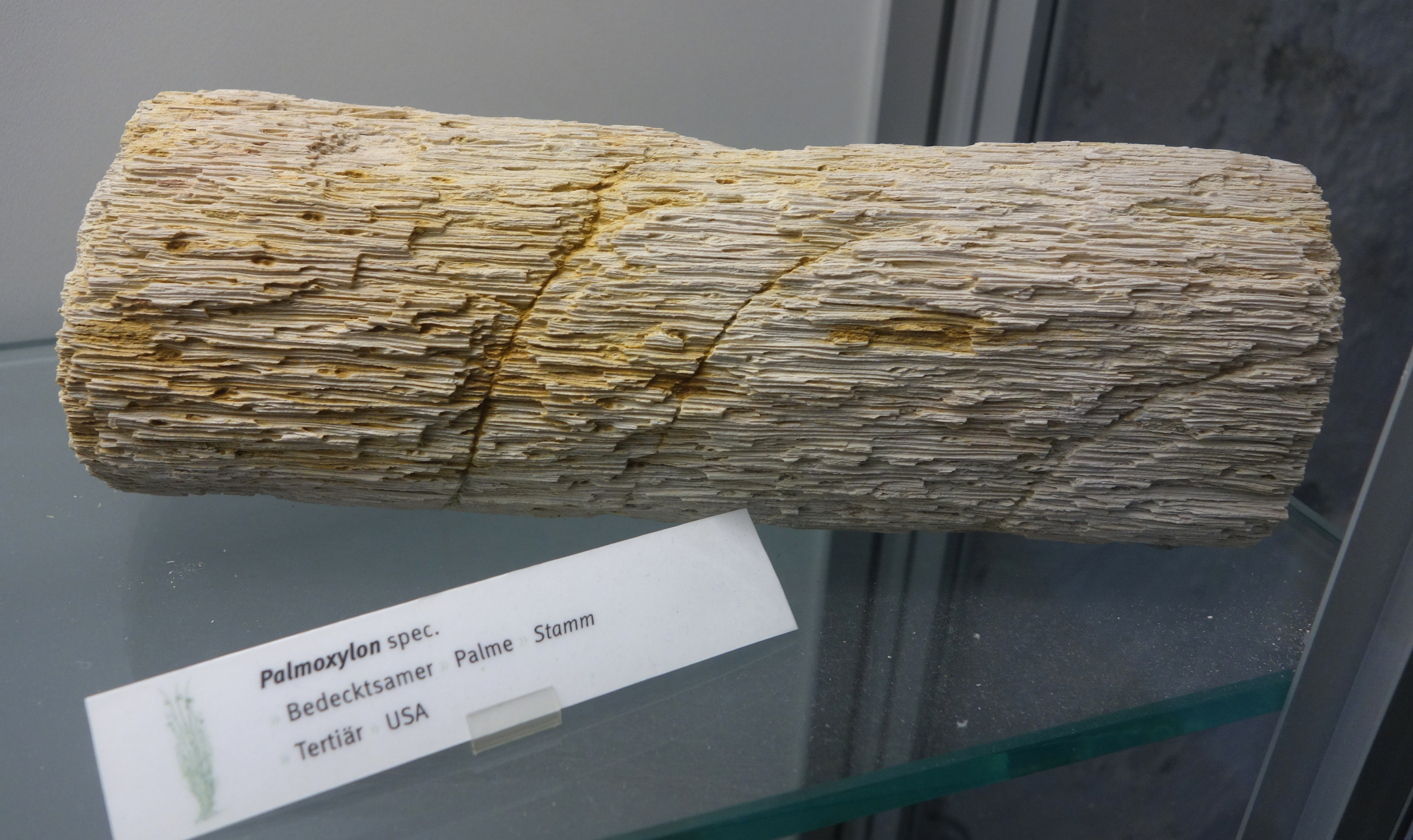
- Petrified trunk segment of the Late Cretaceous-Miocene palm wood Palmoxylon
  †Palmoxylon
  - †Palmoxylon cellulosum
  - †Palmoxylon quenstedi
- †Papillina
  - †Papillina dumosa
- Paraconger
- Paracyathus
  - †Paracyathus alternatus – type locality for species
  - †Paracyathus bellus
- Paracypris
  - †Paracypris rosefieldensis
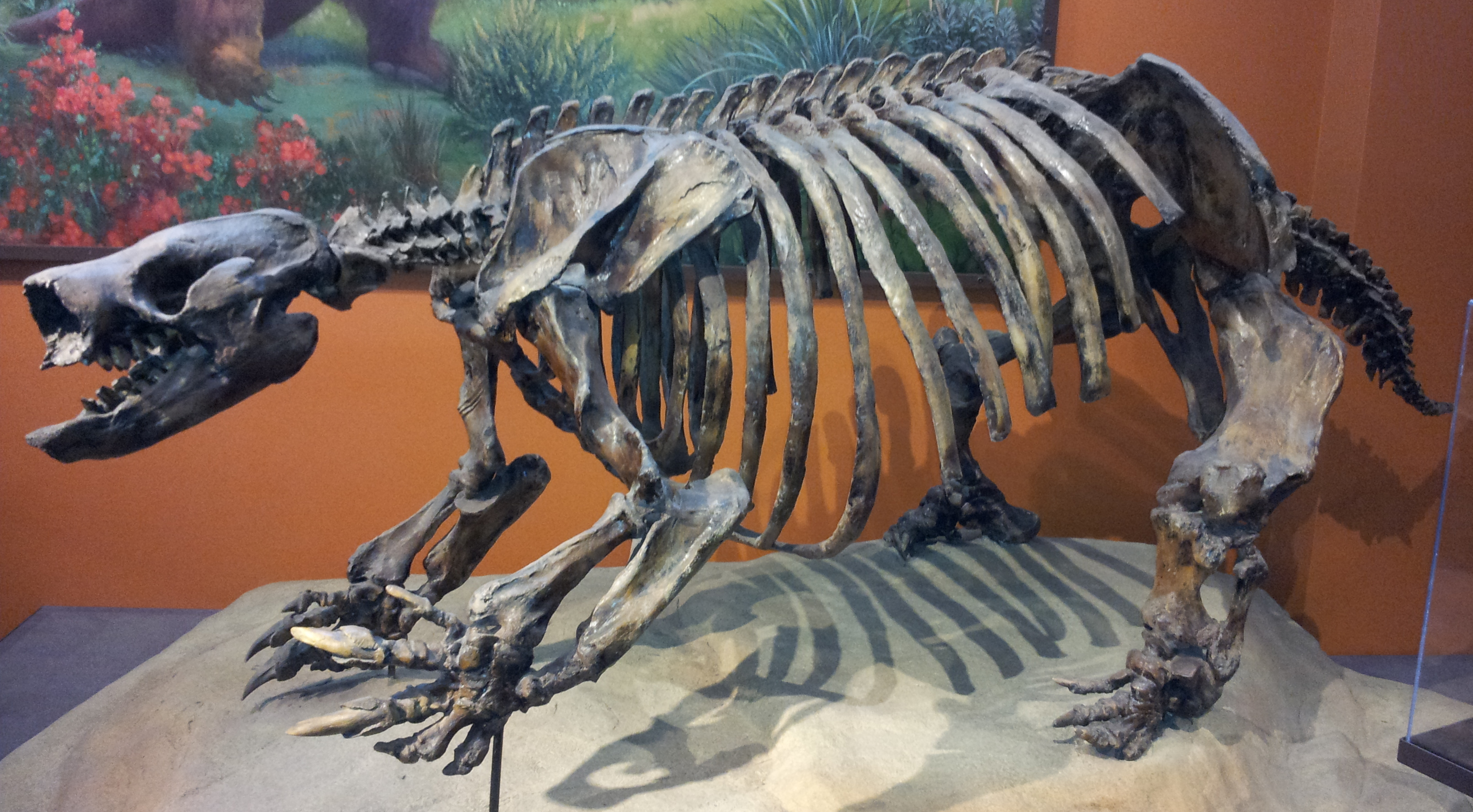
- Fossilized skeleton of the Pliocene-Pleistocene ground sloth Paramylodon
  †Paramylodon
  - †Paramylodon harlani – type locality for species
- Parasmilia
  - †Parasmilia ludoviciana – type locality for species
- †Parcypris
- Parvilucina
  - †Parvilucina sabelli
- †Patulaxis
  - †Patulaxis scrobiculata
- Pecten
  - †Pecten perplanus
- †Pediastrum
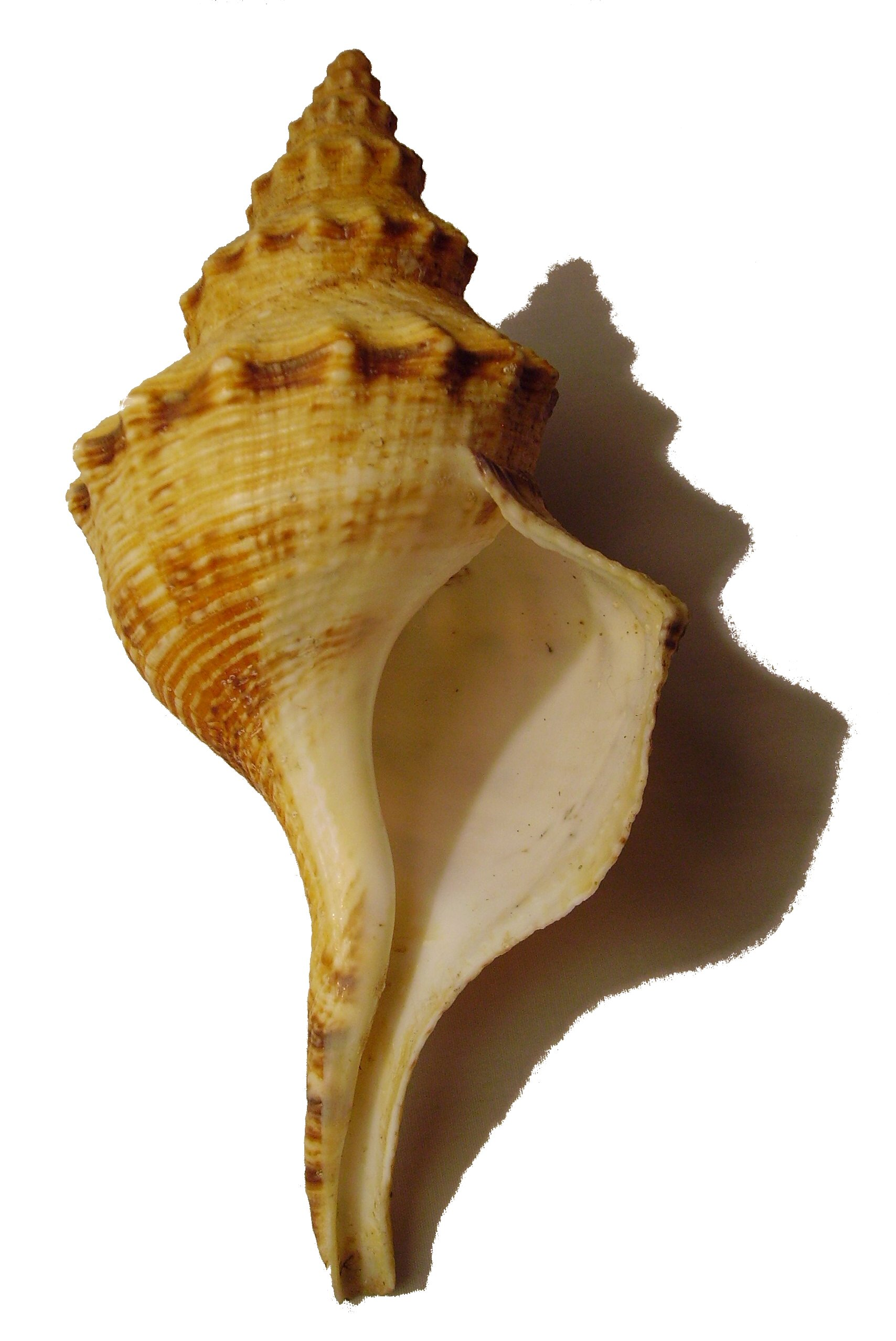
- An apertural view of a shell of Penion maximus.
  Penion
  - †Penion penrosei
- Periploma
  - †Periploma claibornense
  - †Periploma collardi
  - †Periploma howei – type locality for species
- †Perotriletes
- †Pesavis
  - †Pesavis tagulensis
- †Petauristodon
- Petrophyllia
  - †Petrophyllia vernonensis – type locality for species
  - †Petrophyllia vicksburgensis
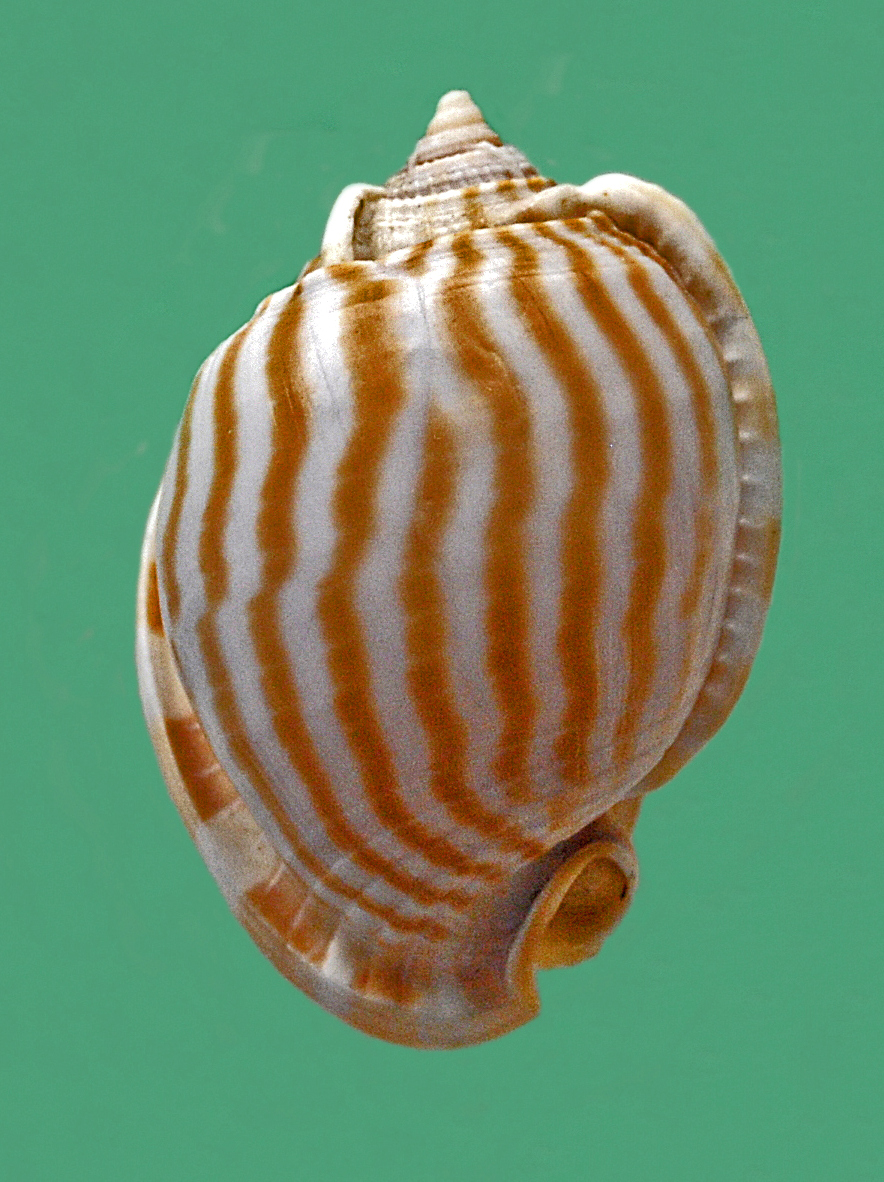
- Shell of a Phalium, or bonnet shell sea snail
  Phalium
  - †Phalium brevicostatum
  - †Phalium taitii
- Pholadomya
  - †Pholadomya harrisi
- Phos
  - †Phos sagenum
  - †Phos texanum
- Picea
  - †Picea critchfieldii
- †Piceapollenites
- †Pilicatula
  - †Pilicatula filamentosa
- Pinna
  - †Pinna gardnerae
- †Pinuspollenites
- †Pistillipollenites
  - †Pistillipollenites mcgregorii
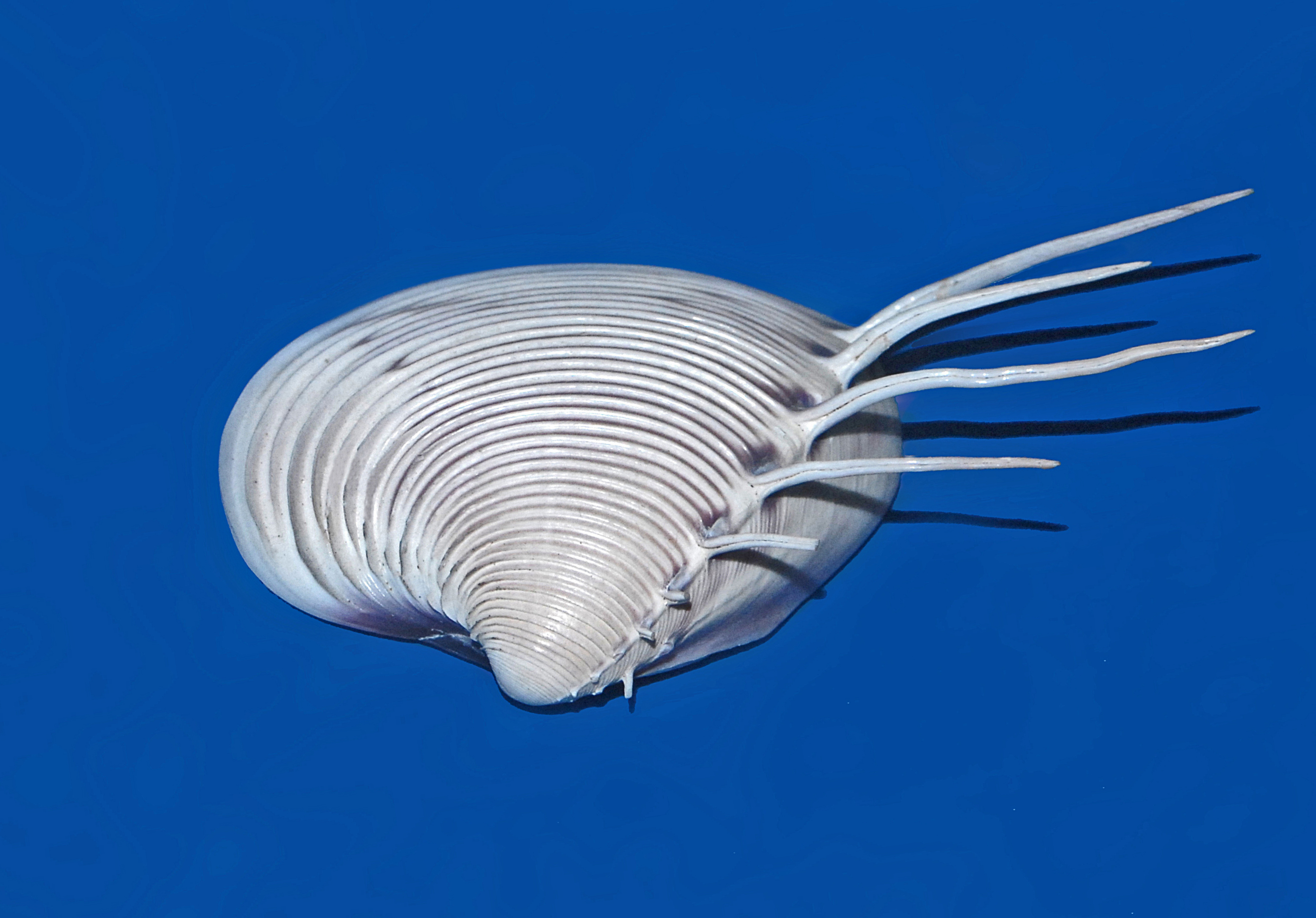
- Shell of a Pitar venus clam
  Pitar
  - †Pitar securiformis
  - †Pitar trigoniata
- †Plagiarca
  - †Plagiarca rhomboidella
  - †Plagiarca vaughani
- Plagiocardium
- Planorbulina
  - †Planorbulina mediterranensis
- Planularia
- Planulina
  - †Planulina ouachitaensis
- †Platycaryapollenites
  - †Platycaryapollenites platycaryoides
- †Platyoptera
  - †Platyoptera extenta
- Platytrochus – type locality for genus
  - †Platytrochus elegans – type locality for species
- †Pleuricellaesporites
- Pleurofusia
  - †Pleurofusia danvicola
  - †Pleurofusia evanescens
  - †Pleurofusia fluctuosa
  - †Pleurofusia huppertzi
  - †Pleurofusia subservata
- †Pleuroliria
  - †Pleuroliria crenulosa
  - †Pleuroliria jacksonella
  - †Pleuroliria simplex
- Pleuromeris
  - †Pleuromeris inflatior
  - †Pleuromeris inflator
- Pleurotomella
  - †Pleurotomella veatchi
- Plicatula
  - †Plicatula filamentosa
  - †Plicatula louisiana
- Podocarpus
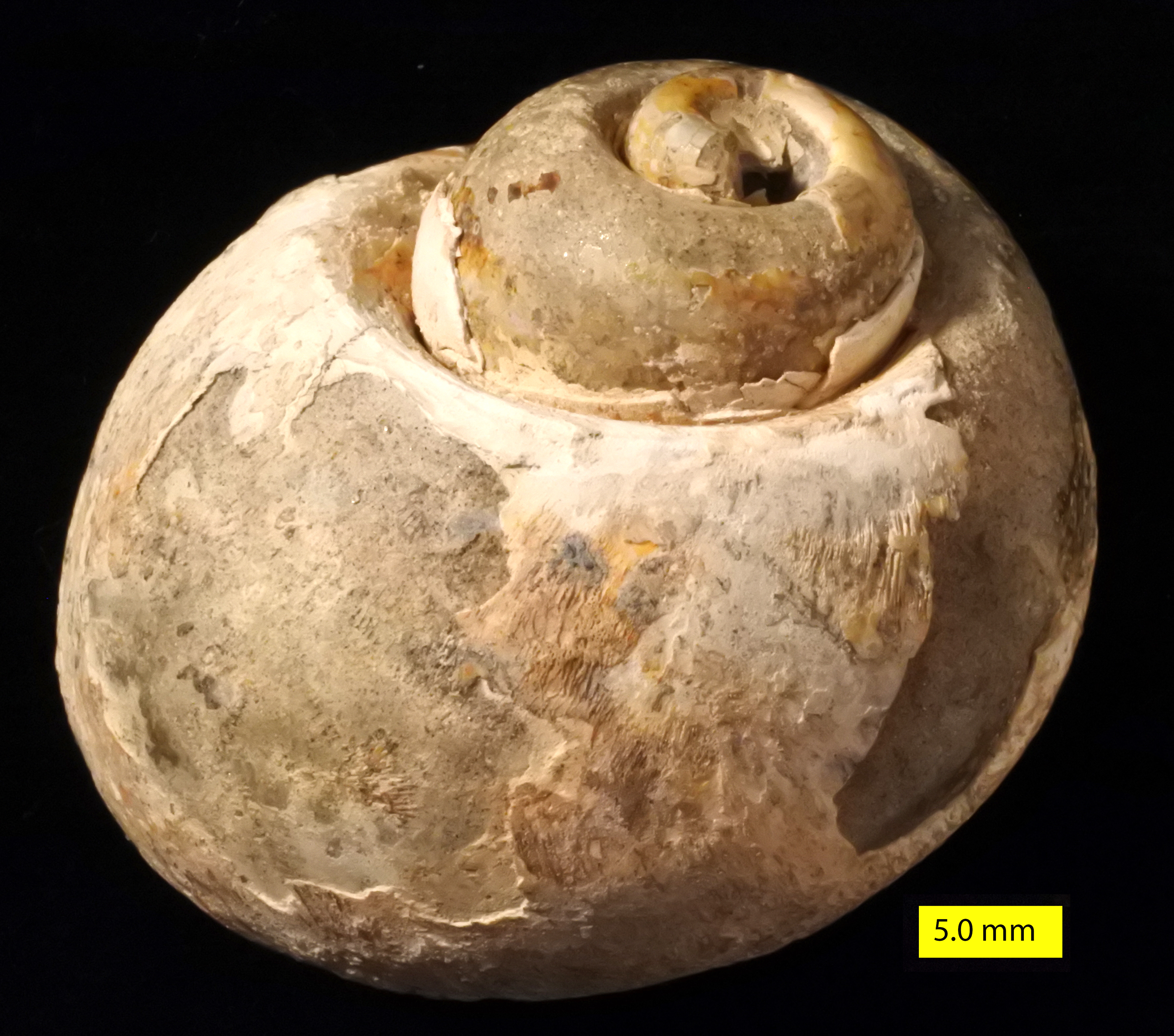
- Fossilized shell of the Paleocene-modern moon snail Polinices
  Polinices
  - †Polinices aratus
  - †Polinices harrisii
  - †Polinices julianna
  - †Polinices weisbordi
- †Pollinices
  - †Pollinices harrisii
- †Polycolporopollenites
- Polymorphina
  - †Polymorphina advena
- †Polypodium
- Polyschides
  - †Polyschides margarita
- Pontocythere
- †Pontogeneus – type locality for genus
  - †Pontogeneus priscus – type locality for species
- †Porocolpopollenites
- Poromya
  - †Poromya mississippiensis
- †Porticulasphaera
  - †Porticulasphaera index
- †Preophidion
  - †Preophidion meyeri
- †Priscoficus
  - †Priscoficus juvenis
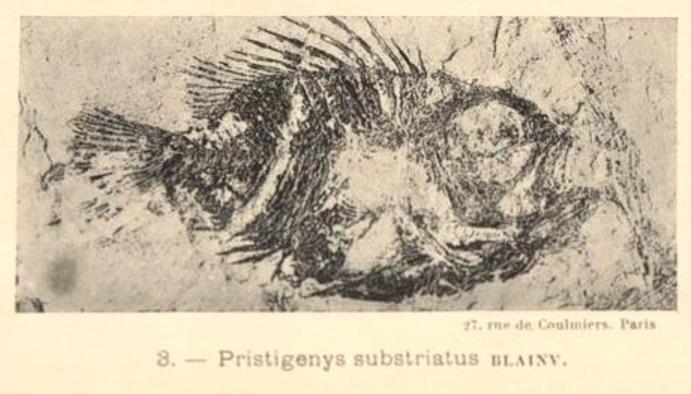
- Fossilized skeleton of the Eocene bony fish Pristigenys
  Pristigenys
  - †Pristigenys obliquus
- Pristipomoides
- Pristis
  - †Pristis lathami
- †Projenneria
  - †Projenneria ludoviciana – type locality for species
- Propeamussium
  - †Propeamussium squamulum – or unidentified comparable form
- †Propristis
  - †Propristis schweinfurthi
- †Prosynthetoceras
  - †Prosynthetoceras francisi
- †Proteacidites
- †Protosurcula
  - †Protosurcula gabbii
- †Pseudohastigerina
  - †Pseudohastigerina micra
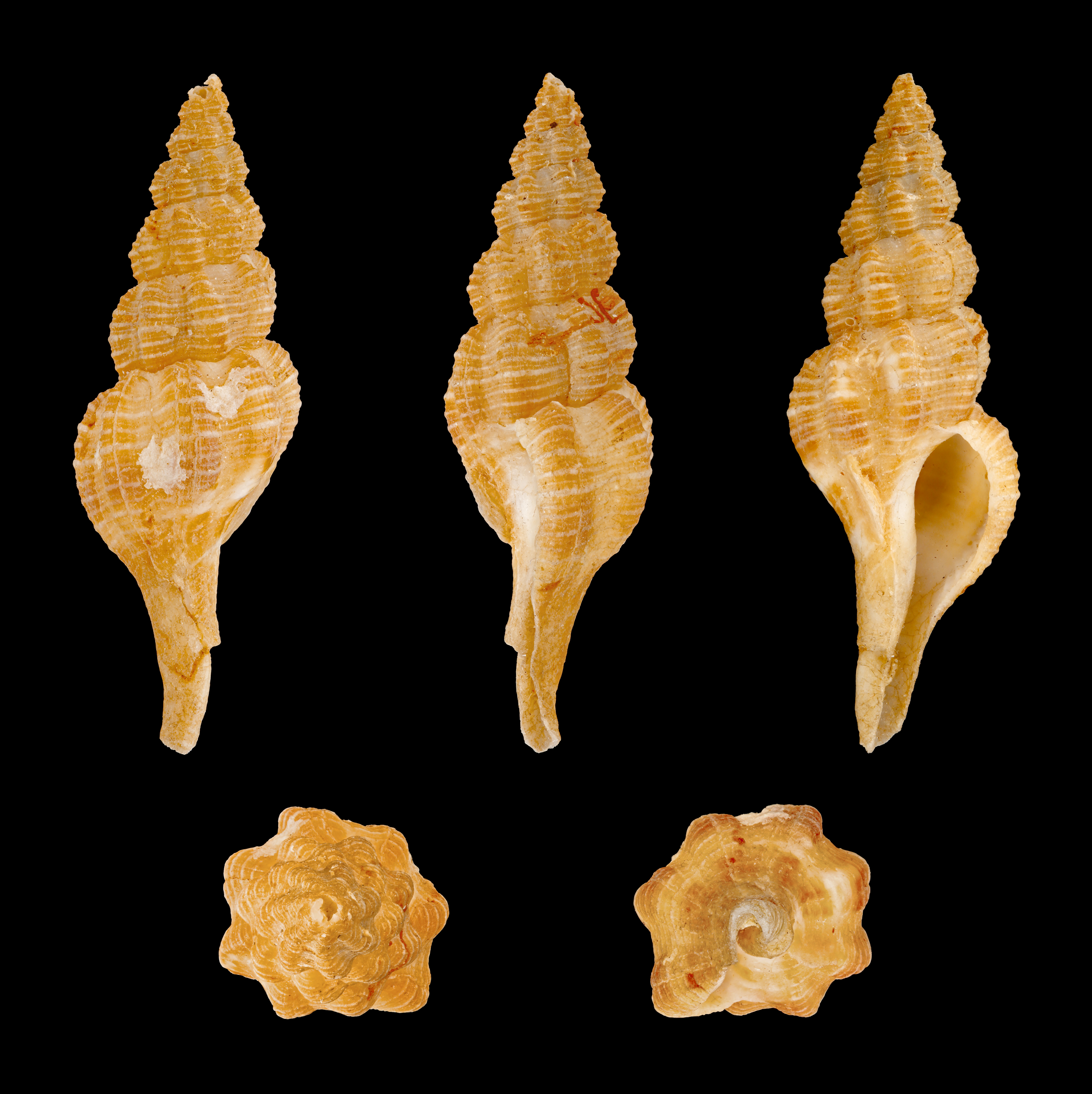
- Shell in multiple views of a Pseudolatirus spindle sea snail
  †Pseudolatirus
  - †Pseudolatirus tortilis
- Pseudoliva
  - †Pseudoliva santander
  - †Pseudoliva vetusta
- Pseudoneptunea – or unidentified comparable form
  - †Pseudoneptunea harrisi
- Pseudononion
  - †Pseudononion spissus
- †Pseudoparablastomeryx
- Pseudophichthys
- †Pseudoplicapollis
- Pteria
  - †Pteria limula
- †Pterocaryapollenites
- †Pteropsella
  - †Pteropsella lapidosa
- †Pterosphenus
  - †Pterosphenus schucherti
- Pterynotus
  - †Pterynotus sabinola
  - †Pterynotus weisbordi – type locality for species
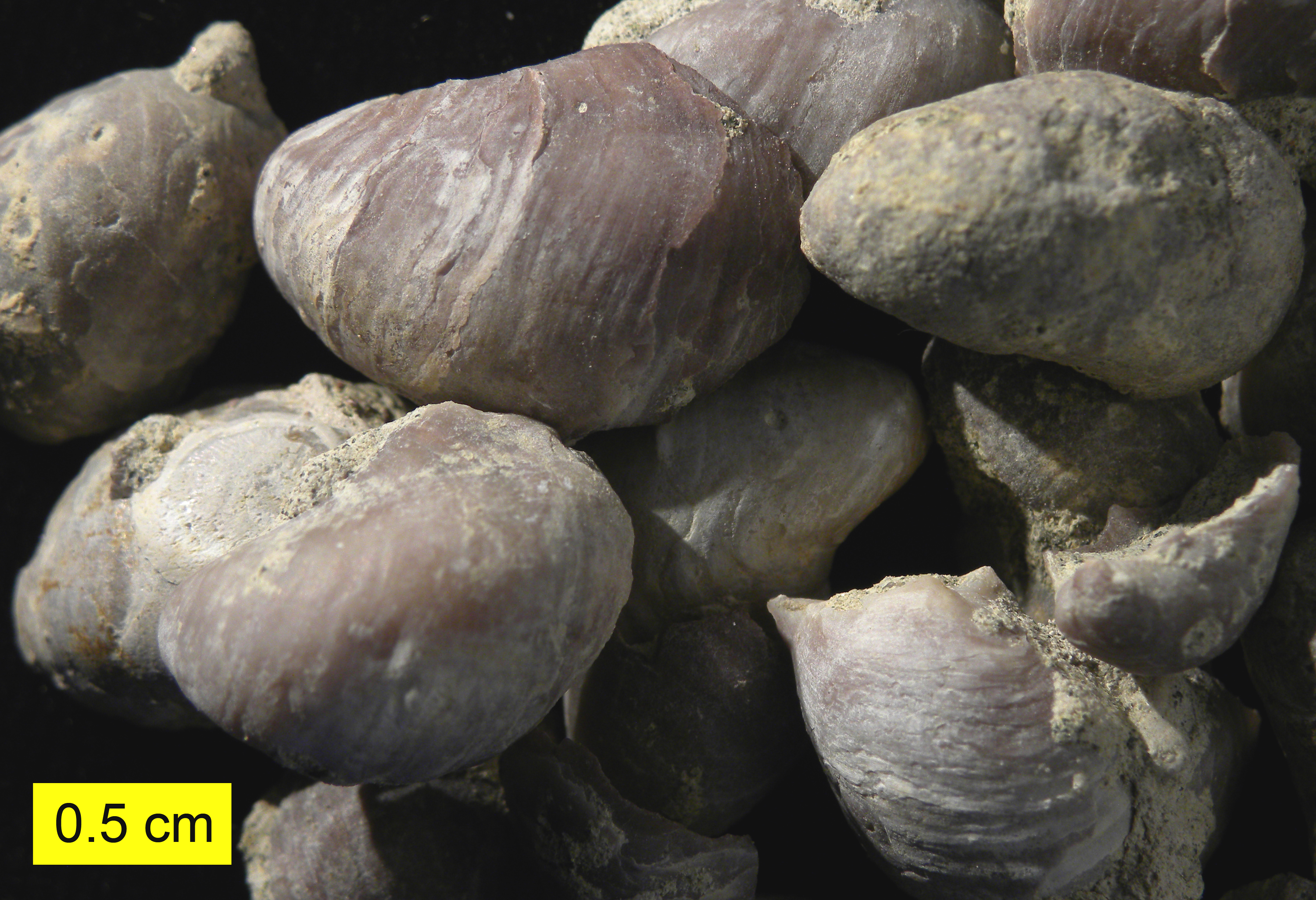
- Assemblage of fossilized shells of the Cretaceous-Pleistocene oyster Pycnodonte
  Pycnodonte
  - †Pycnodonte ludoviciana
  - †Pycnodonte sylvaerupis
  - †Pycnodonte trigonalis
  - †Pycnodonte vicksburgensis
- Pyramidella
  - †Pyramidella lapinaria
  - †Pyramidella meyeri
  - †Pyramidella perexilis
- †Pyramimitra
  - †Pyramimitra terebraeformis
- Pythonichthys – or unidentified comparable form

=== Q ===
- †Quadrapollenites
- †Quercoidites
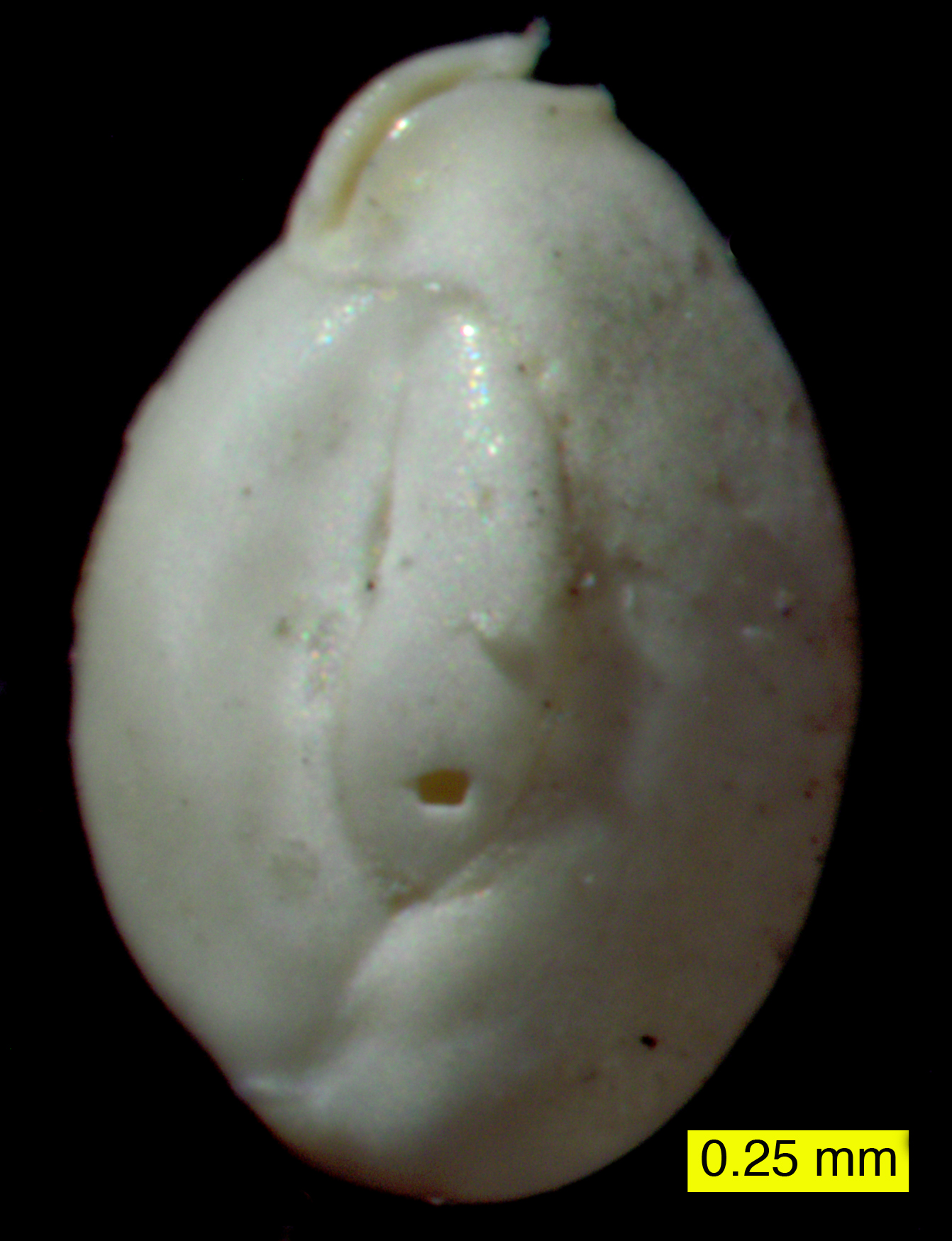
- Shell of a Quinqueloculina foraminiferan
  Quinqueloculina
  - †Quinqueloculina cookei
  - †Quinqueloculina vicksburgensis

=== R ===
- Raphitoma
  - †Raphitoma nucleola
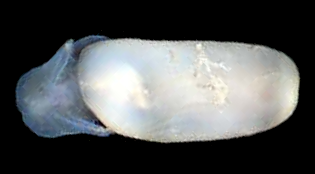
- A living Retusa barrel bubble sea snail
  Retusa
  - †Retusa adamsi
  - †Retusa galba
  - †Retusa jacksonensis
  - †Retusa kellogii
- Reussella
  - †Reussella byramensis
  - †Reussella oligocenica
- †Rhabdopitaria
  - †Rhabdopitaria winnensis
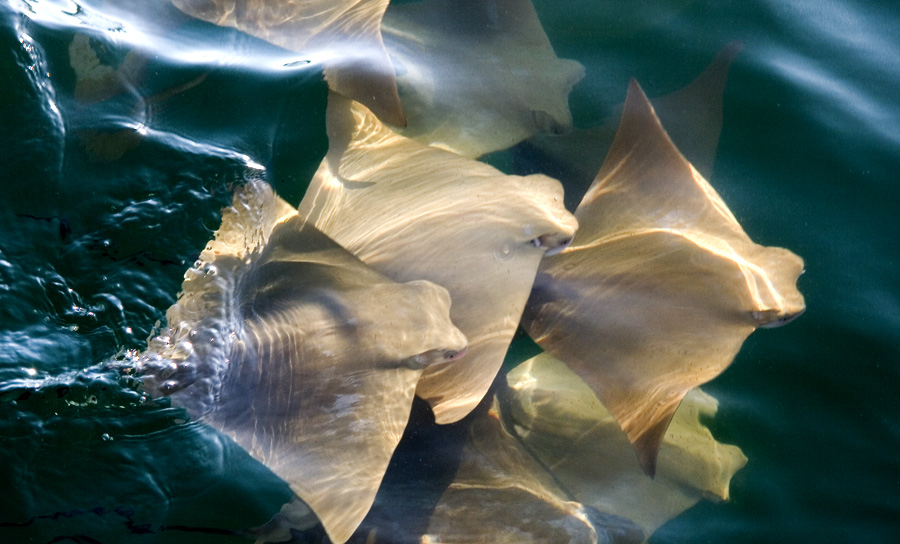
- A school of living Rhinoptera, or cownose rays
  Rhinoptera
- Rhizoprionodon
- Rhizorus – or unidentified comparable form
  - †Rhizorus minutissimus
  - †Rhizorus wellsi
- Rhynchoconger
- Rimella
  - †Rimella texanum
- †Ringicardium
  - †Ringicardium harrisi
- Ringicula
  - †Ringicula butleriana
  - †Ringicula trapaquara
- †Rotalia
  - †Rotalia byramensis
- †Rudiscala
  - †Rudiscala harrisi

=== S ===
- Saracenaria
  - †Saracenaria moresiana
- Sassia
  - †Sassia jacksonensis
  - †Sassia septemdentata
- Scaphella – or unidentified comparable form
  - †Scaphella newcombiana
- Schizaster
  - †Schizaster armiger
- †Schizosporis
  - †Schizosporis paleocenicus
- Sciaena
  - †Sciaena pseudoradians
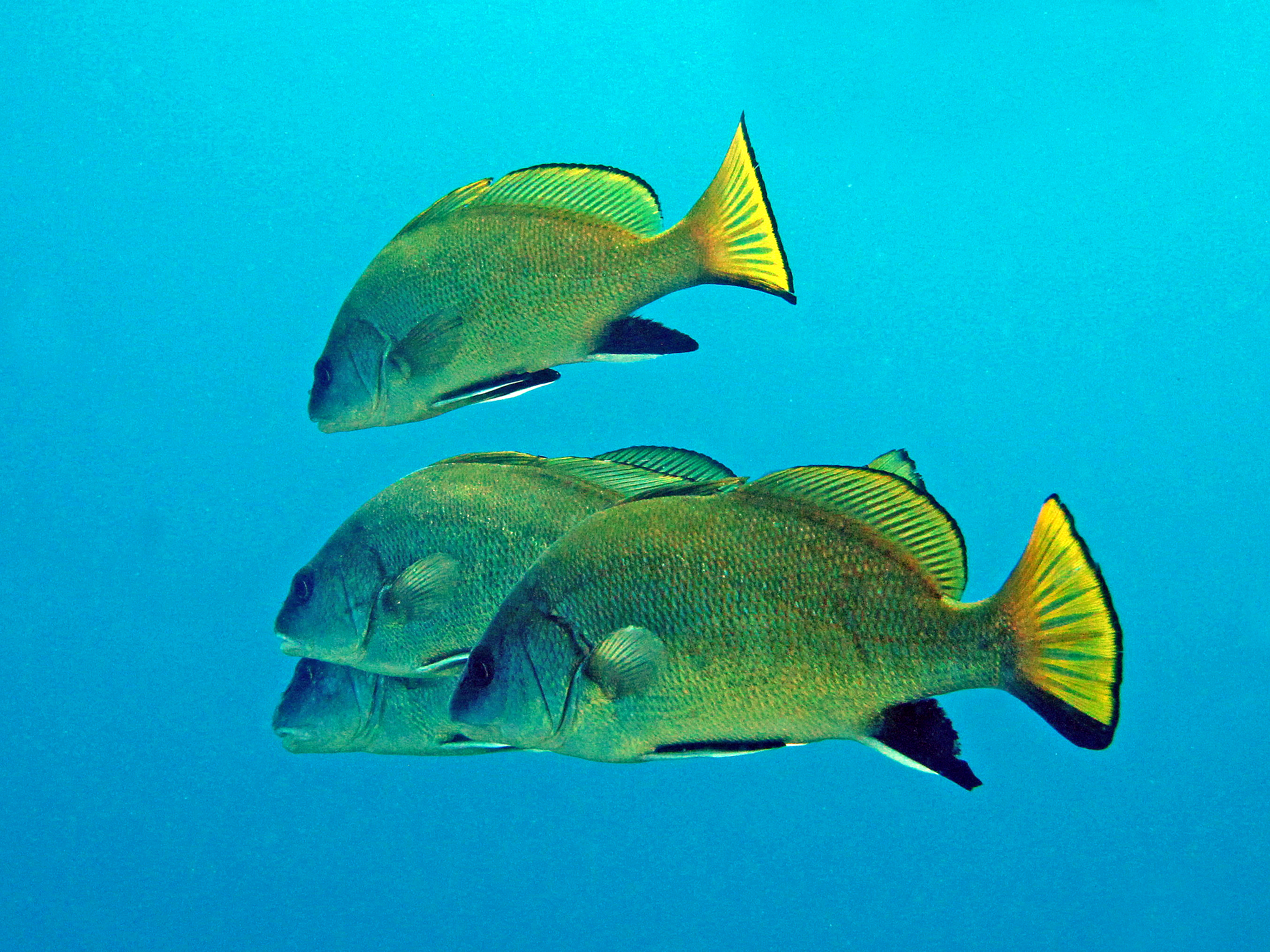
  - A living Sciaena umbra, or brown meagre
    †Sciaena umbra
- †Sciaenidarium
  - †Sciaenidarium claybornensis
- Scobinella
  - †Scobinella famelica
  - †Scobinella hammettensis
  - †Scobinella louisianae
  - †Scobinella newtonensis
  - †Scobinella transitionalis
- †Sequoidendron
- Serpulorbis
  - †Serpulorbis chavani
- Sigmomorphina
  - †Sigmomorphina jacksonensis
  - †Sigmomorphina pulchra
  - †Sigmomorphina semitecta
- †Sigmopollis
- Simnia
  - †Simnia subtruncata
- †Sinistrella
  - †Sinistrella americana
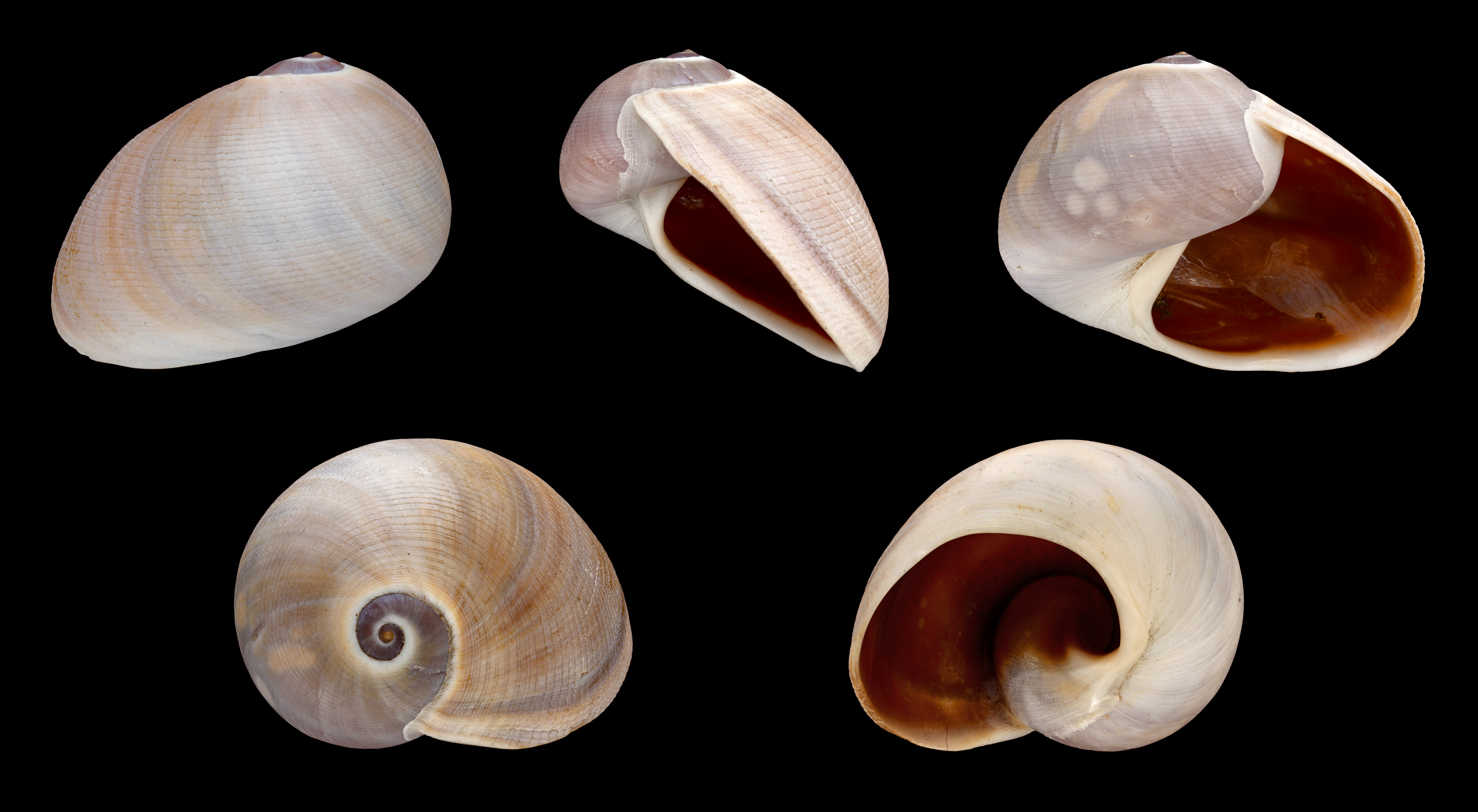
- Several views of the shell of a Sinum moon snail
  Sinum
  - †Sinum danvillense
  - †Sinum fiski – type locality for species
  - †Sinum jacksonense
- Siphonalia
  - †Siphonalia sullivani
- Siphonina
  - †Siphonina advena
  - †Siphonina jacksonensis
- Sirembo – or unidentified related form
- †Skenae
  - †Skenae pignus
- Solariella
  - †Solariella tricostata
- Solariorbis
  - †Solariorbis subangulatus
- Solen
  - †Solen pendletonensis – type locality for species
- †Sparidarum – report made of unidentified related form or using admittedly obsolete nomenclature
- †Sphaerocypraea
  - †Sphaerocypraea jacksonensis
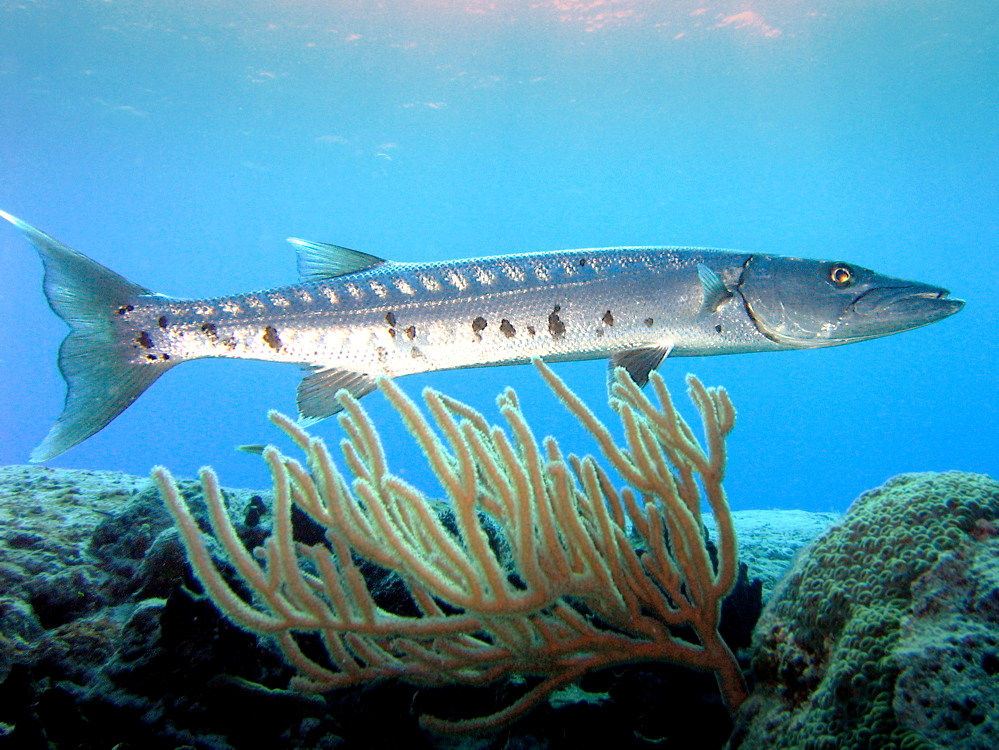
- A living Sphyraena, or barracuda
  Sphyraena
  - †Sphyraena major
- †Spinaepollis
  - †Spinaepollis spinosus
- Spirillina
  - †Spirillina vicksburgensis
- Spiroloculina
- Spiroplectammina
  - †Spiroplectammina howei
  - †Spiroplectammina mississippiensis
- †Spirotextularia
  - †Spirotextularia mississippiensis
- Spisula
  - †Spisula jacksonensis
  - †Spisula parilis
  - †Spisula praetenuis – or unidentified comparable form
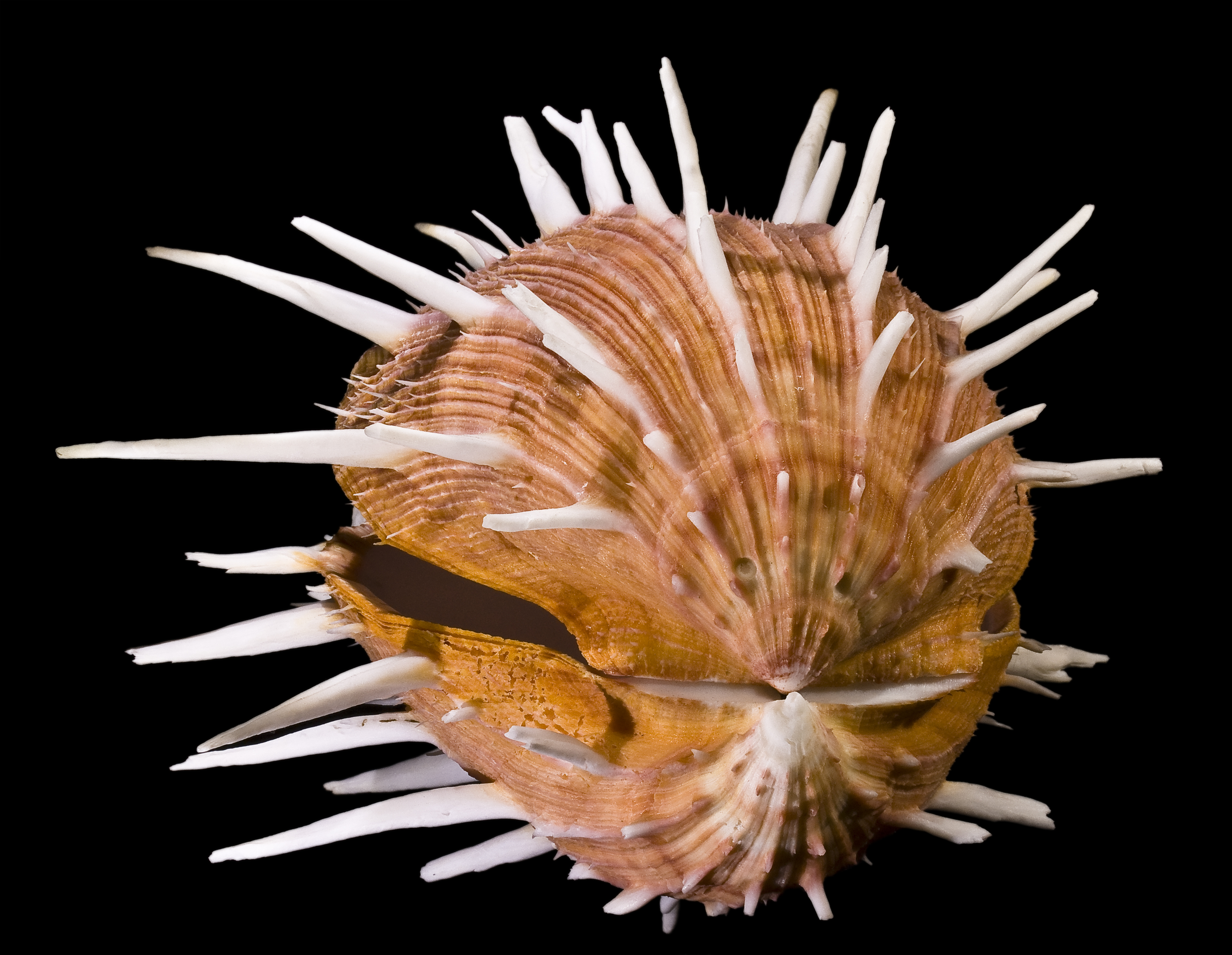
- Shell of a Spondylus, or spiny oyster
  Spondylus
- †Sterisporites
  - †Sterisporites bimammatus
  - †Sterisporites buchenauensis
  - †Sterisporites bujargensis
  - †Sterisporites steroides
- †Sulcocypraea
  - †Sulcocypraea healeyi
  - †Sulcocypraea vaughani
- †Sullivania
  - †Sullivania fisherensis
- †Surculoma
  - †Surculoma falsabenes
  - †Surculoma kellogii
  - †Surculoma sabinicola
  - †Surculoma stantoni
- Sveltella
  - †Sveltella parva

=== T ===
- Taxodium
- Teinostoma
  - †Teinostoma barryi
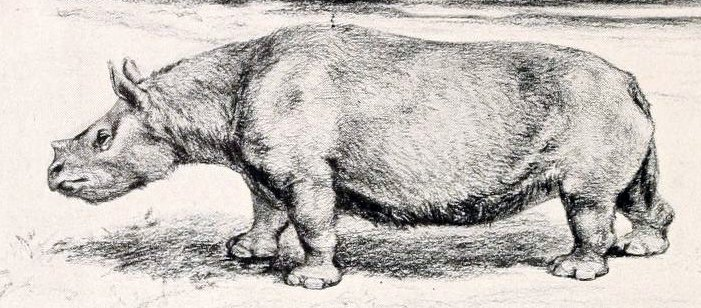
- Restoration of the Miocene-Pliocene rhinoceros Teleoceras
  †Teleoceras
- Tellina
  - †Tellina bellsiana
  - †Tellina estellensis
  - †Tellina vicksburgensis
- Tenagodus
  - †Tenagodus vitis
- Terebra
  - †Terebra abditiva
  - †Terebra jacksonensis
  - †Terebra texagyra
- †Terebrifusus – tentative report
- Teredo
  - †Teredo mississippiensis
- †Tetraporina
- †Texomys
  - †Texomys ritchiei
- †Textualaria
  - †Textualaria tumidula
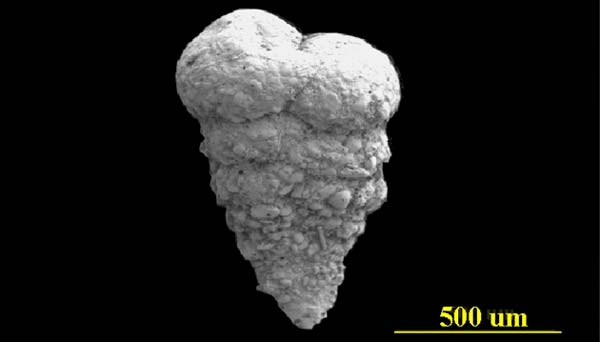
- Fossilized shell of the Carboniferous-modern foraminiferan Textularia
  Textularia
  - †Textularia dibollensis
- †Thompsonipollis
  - †Thompsonipollis magnificus
- †Tiburnus
  - †Tiburnus eboreus
- †Tiliaepollenites
- Trachycardium
  - †Trachycardium ouachitense
- †Triagnulocypris
  - †Triagnulocypris gibsonensis – tentative report
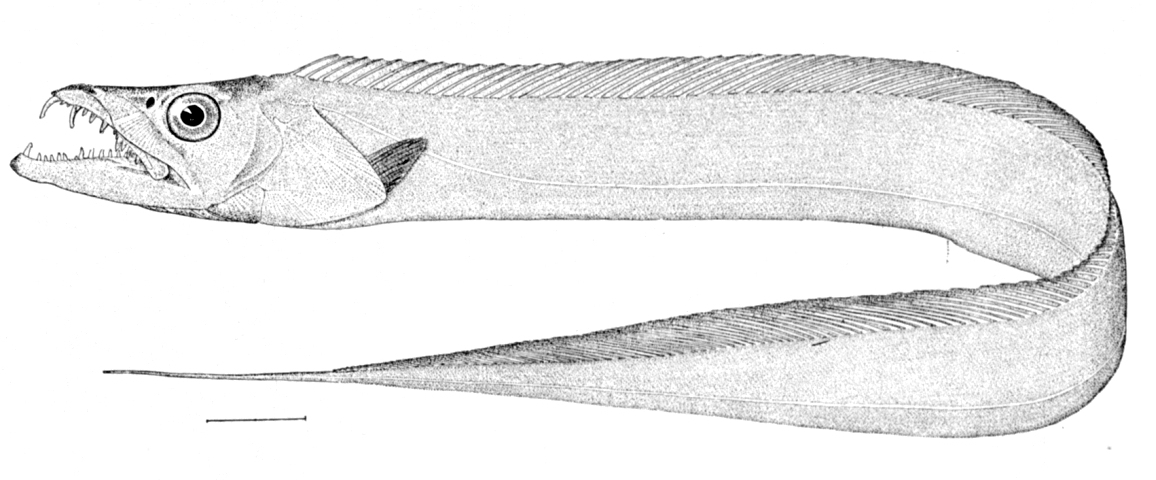
- Illustration of a living Trichiurus cutlassfish
  Trichiurus
  - †Trichiurus sagittidens
- †Tricolpites
  - †Tricolpites hians
- †Tricolpopollenites
  - †Tricolpopollenites geranoides
- †Tricolporopollenites
- Trigonostoma
  - †Trigonostoma babylonicum
  - †Trigonostoma panones
  - †Trigonostoma selectum
- Trigonulina
  - †Trigonulina satex
- Triloculina
  - †Triloculina byramensis
  - †Triloculina sculptura
- †Trinacria
  - †Trinacria microcancellata – or unidentified comparable form
- †Triplanosporites
- †Triporopollenites
  - †Triporopollenites bituitus
- †Tritonatractus
  - †Tritonatractus pearlensis
- †Tritonidea
  - †Tritonidea pachecoi
- Trochita
  - †Trochita aperta
- Trochocyathus
  - †Trochocyathus montgomeriensis
- †Tropisurcula
  - †Tropisurcula crenula
- †Trudopollis
- †Truncorotaloides
  - †Truncorotaloides danvillensis
- †Trypanotoma
  - †Trypanotoma obtusa
  - †Trypanotoma terebriformis
- †Turbinolia
  - †Turbinolia pharetra
  - †Turbinolia subtercisa
  - †Turbinolia tenuis
  - †Turbinolia vicksburgensis
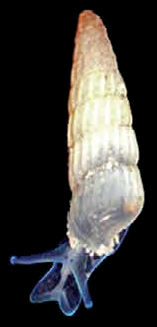
- A living Turbonilla parasitic pyram sea snail
  Turbonilla
  - †Turbonilla major – tentative report
- Turricula
  - †Turricula nasuto
  - †Turricula plenta
  - †Turricula plutonica
- †Turrilina
  - †Turrilina robertsi
- Turris
  - †Turris capax
  - †Turris kerenensis
  - †Turris rockscreekensis
  - †Turris siphus
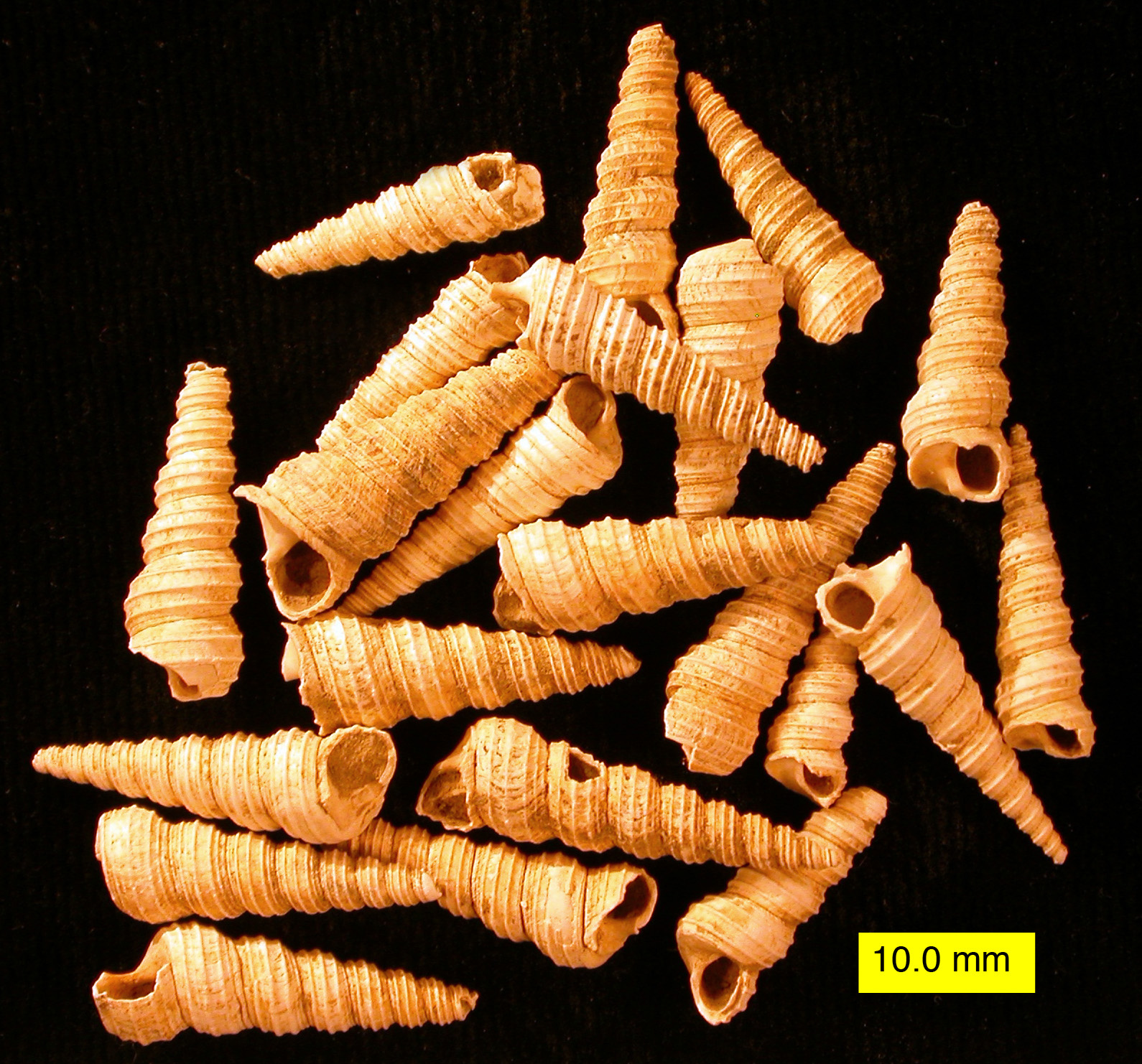
- Fossilized shells of the Late Jurassic-modern tower snail Turritella
  Turritella
  - †Turritella aldrichi
  - †Turritella bellifera
  - †Turritella bunkerhillensis
  - †Turritella clevelandia
  - †Turritella creola
  - †Turritella dutexata
  - †Turritella eurynome
  - †Turritella gardnerae – type locality for species
  - †Turritella multilira
  - †Turritella nasuta
  - †Turritella praecincta
- †Tythonichthys – or unidentified comparable form

=== U ===
- †Ulmipollenites
- Umbraculum
  - †Umbraculum planulatum
- Umbrina
  - †Umbrina gemma – or unidentified related form
- †Undulatisporites
- Uroconger
- Uromitra
  - †Uromitra grantensis
- Ursus
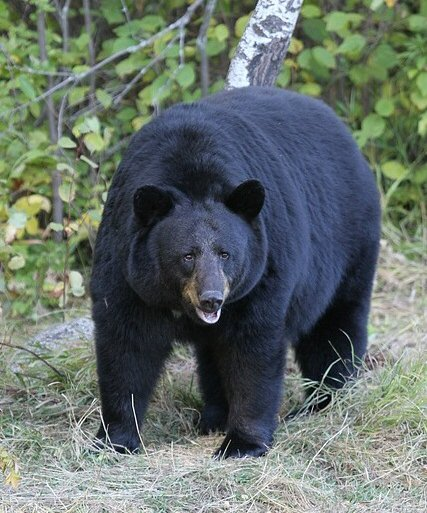
  - A living Ursus americanus, or American black bear
    †Ursus americanus
- Uvigerina
  - †Uvigerina gardnerae
  - †Uvigerina jacksonensis
  - †Uvigerina vicksburgensis

=== V ===
- Vaginulina
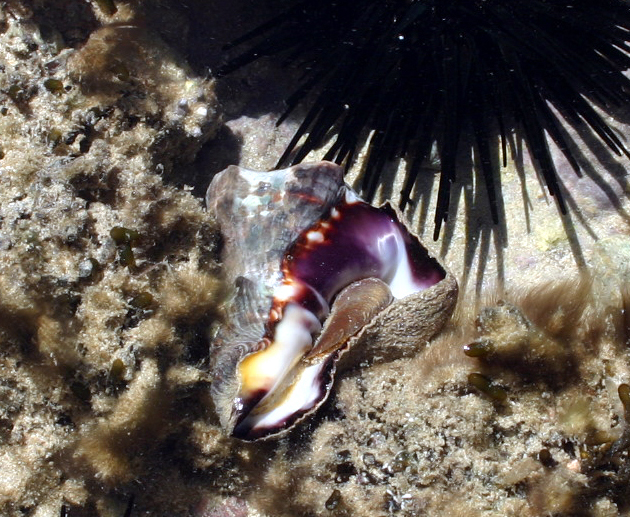
- A living Vasum, or vase sea snail
  Vasum
  - †Vasum humerosum
- Venericardia
  - †Venericardia apodensata
  - †Venericardia bashiplata
  - †Venericardia carsonensis
  - †Venericardia densata
  - †Venericardia diversidentata
  - †Venericardia gardnerae – type locality for species
  - †Venericardia klimacodes
  - †Venericardia natchitoches
  - †Venericardia rotunda
  - †Venericardia sabinensis – type locality for species
- †Verrucatosporites
  - †Verrucatosporites prosecundus
  - †Verrucatosporites spp,
- Verticordia
  - †Verticordia cossmanni
  - †Verticordia sotoensis
- †Virgulina
  - †Virgulina vicksburgensis
- †Vokesula
  - †Vokesula aldrichi
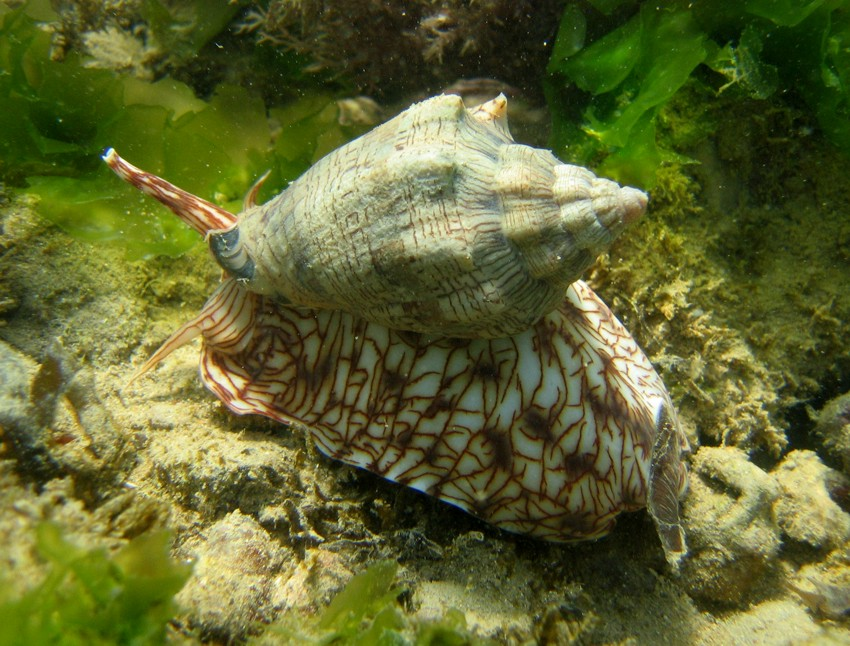
- A living Voluta sea snail
  Voluta
  - †Voluta newcombiana
- †Volvaria
  - †Volvaria reticulata

=== X ===
- Xenistius – or unidentified related form
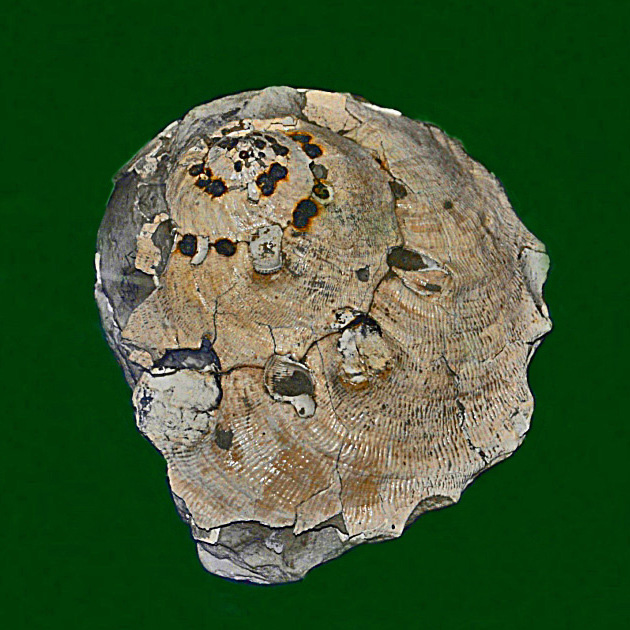
- Fossilized shell of the Late Cretaceous-modern carrier shell sea snail Xenophora
  Xenophora
  - †Xenophora reclusa
- †Xiphiorhynchus

=== Y ===
- Yoldia
  - †Yoldia hammetti
  - †Yoldia kindlei

=== Z ===
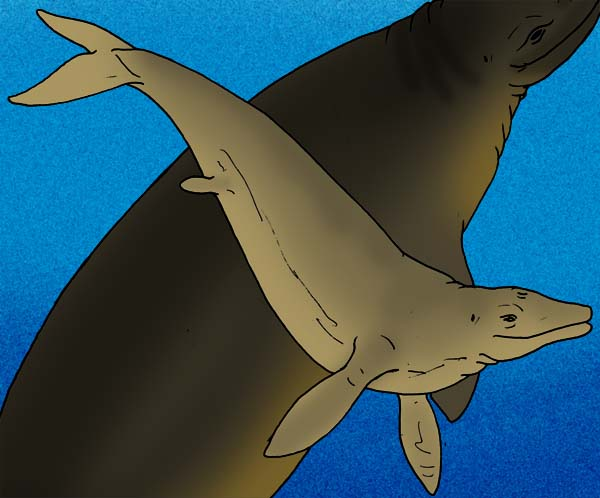
- Life restoration of the Eocene whale Zygorhiza
  †Zygorhiza
  - †Zygorhiza kochii
