= Coral Patch Seamount =

Seamount between Madeira and Portugal

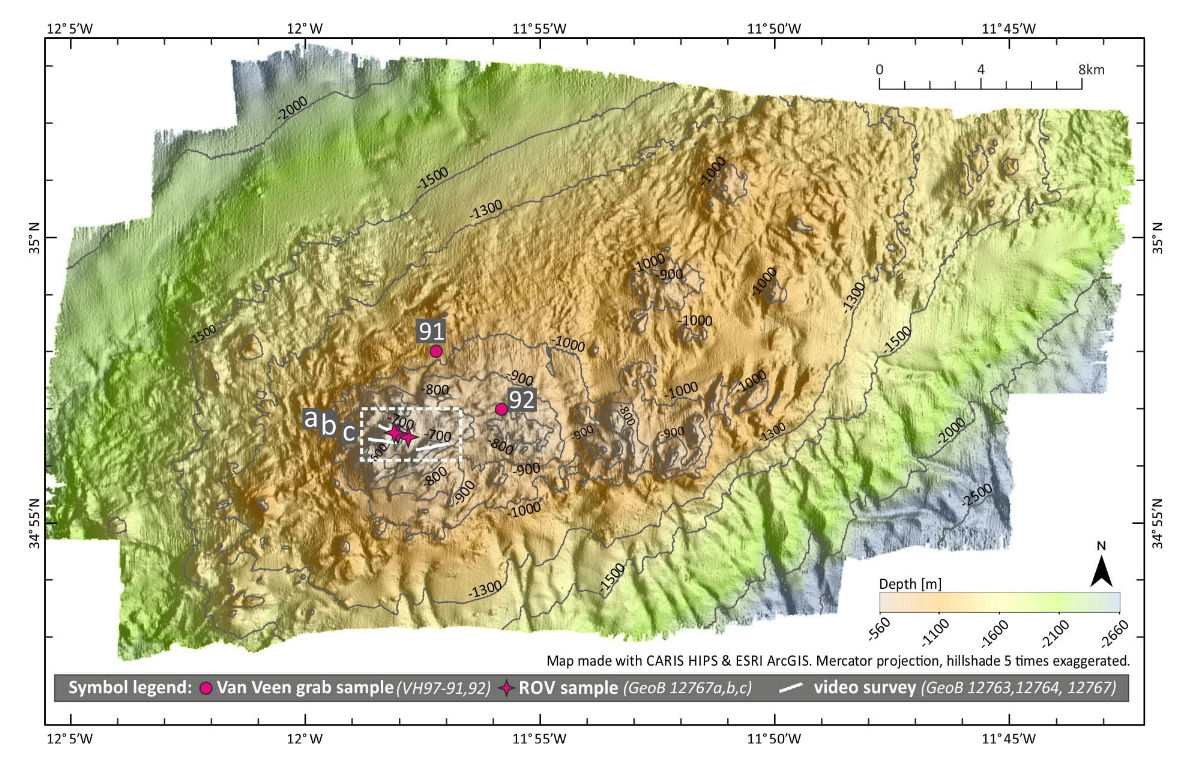
- Bathymetric map of Coral Patch Seamount
- Bathymetric map of Coral Patch Seamount

Location
- Location: Atlantic Ocean
- Coordinates: 34°56′N 11°57′W

Coral Patch Seamount is a seamount (underwater mountain) between Madeira and mainland Portugal in the North Atlantic Ocean. It is an elongated 120 kilometres (75 mi) long and 70 kilometres (43 mi) wide mountain that rises to a depth of about 645 metres (2,116 ft), with nine volcanic cones on its summit. It has steeper southern slopes and a gentle northern slope. To its west lies Ampére Seamount, and together with several neighbouring seamounts it is one of the Horseshoe Seamounts.

The seamount was probably formed by the Madeira hotspot in the Miocene, together with buckling processes in the oceanic crust. It was initially probably an island. There is evidence of submarine landslides and active faults which constitute a tsunami hazard; the 1755 Lisbon earthquake may have occurred north of the seamount.

The name Coral Patch Seamount refers to the presence of cold water corals on the seamount. Their occurrence there was reported first in 1878, five years before the actual discovery of the seamount. They are only sparse on Coral Patch Seamount, probably due to lack of nutrients. A number of other submarine animals including fish have been observed.

== Research history and name ==
An expedition by the CS Dacia laying a deep sea cable between the Canary Islands and Cádiz discovered the seamount on October 12, 1883. The name is a reference to cold water corals dredged from the seamount; their occurrence was reported in 1878. The seamount was originally named "Coral Patch shoal": the term seamount was not yet in use at that time. It is only poorly explored.

== Geography and geomorphology ==
Seamounts of the north-east Atlantic Ocean

A number of seamounts exist in the northeastern Atlantic around the Azores, the Canary Islands and Madeira. They rise between abyssal plains from a seafloor at 4,000–4,800 metres (13,100–15,700 ft) to depths of usually a few hundred meters below sea level. They are known as the Horseshoe Seamounts.

Together with Ampére Seamount farther west Coral Patch Seamount forms the Ampére bank: a 3,400 metres (11,200 ft) deep valley separates the two. To the northeast lies Coral Patch Ridge and north Gorringe Ridge, across the Horseshoe Abyssal Plain. The Seine Hills are located east of Coral Patch Seamount.

Coral Patch Seamount has an elliptical outline, 120 kilometres (75 mi) long and 70 kilometres (43 mi) wide and trending east-northeast. The shallowest point lies at a depth of about 645 metres (2,116 ft). It consists of nine volcanic cones that overlie a sedimentary structural high; the cones and the structural high make up the seamount. The 8 kilometres (5.0 mi) wide 'Vince volcano' is the largest volcanic cone and forms a solitary northeasterly summit; the other eight are clustered in the southwest and one of these forms the shallowest point of the seamount. The southern slopes are steep and feature canyon-like features, the northern slopes are more gentle. Two faults, the North Coral Patch Ridge fault and the South Coral Patch Ridge fault, run northeastward away from Coral Patch Seamount. Both have offset Holocene deposits and thus appear to be active. Thrust faults separate Coral Patch Seamount from the Horseshoe Abyssal Plain.

The surface of the seamount is formed mainly by outcropping basaltic bedrock while sediment deposits are of secondary importance. Outcropping rocks are weathered and often altered by biological activity: sediments occur mainly in depressions and are largely absent on the upper part of the seamount. Most of the sediments appear to originate locally, either from biological activity or as carbonates. Antiforms, gullies and scarps occur on the seamount, the latter are evidence of past submarine landslides or mass wasting phenomena.

== Geology ==
The Madeira hotspot is considered to be responsible for the formation of a 700 kilometres (430 mi) long chain of seamounts going from the 72 million years old Serra de Monchique in Iberia to the 14-0 million years old Porto Santo and Madeira, including Coral Patch Seamount. The plate motion history of the region is complicated and some seamounts formed off-track through pulsations of the mantle plume or through lithospheric anomalies. Buckling of the crust due to plate convergence is also responsible for the uplift of Coral Patch Seamount and has pushed it over the Horseshoes Abyssal Plain.

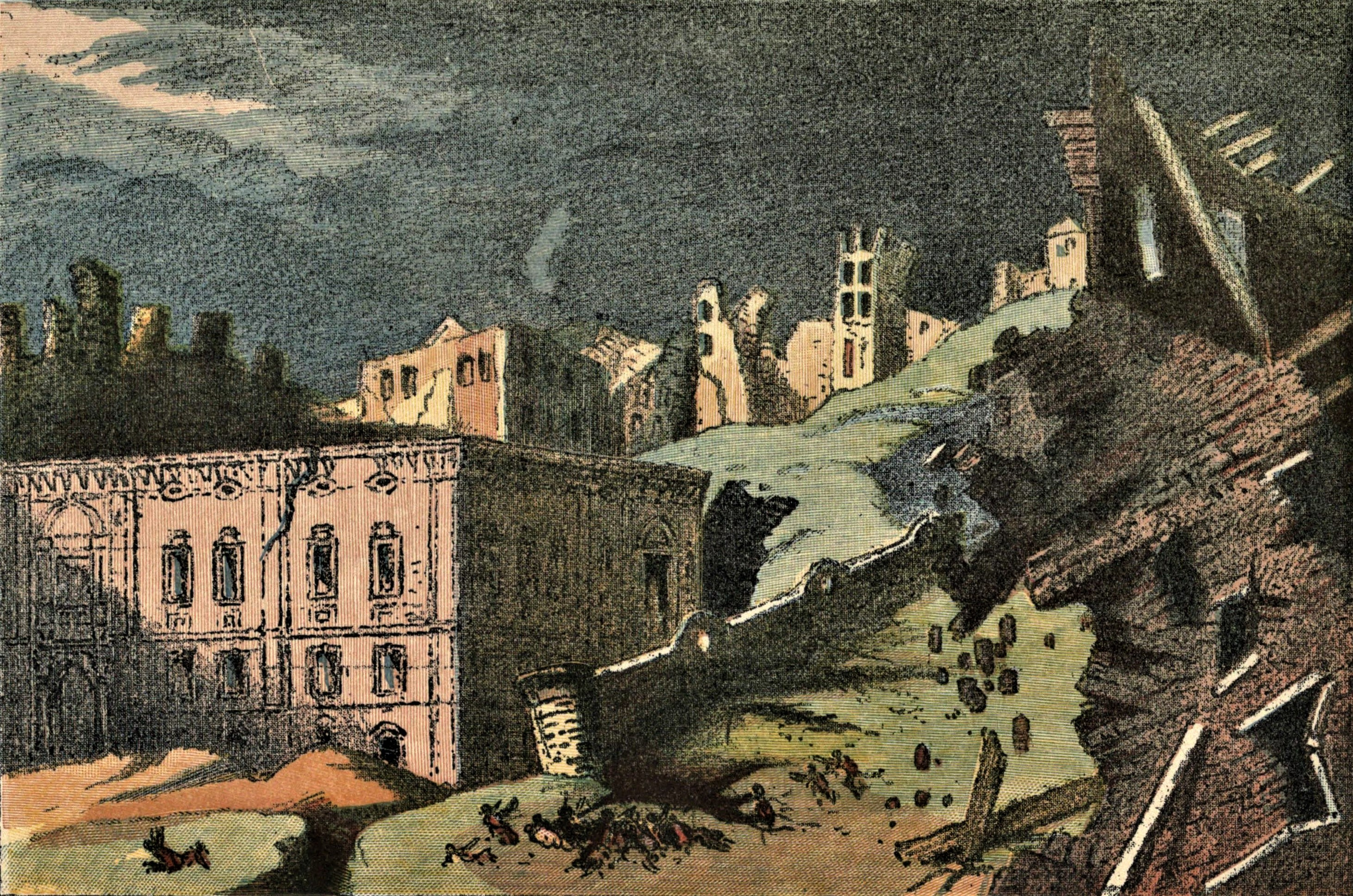
A depiction of the Great Lisbon Earthquake of 1 November 1755, the epicentre of which may have been located between Coral Patch Seamount and Gorringe Bank

Efforts at radiometric dating on Coral Patch Seamount have been unsuccessful, but fossil remains indicate that the seamount was volcanically active in the early Miocene together with the neighbouring Ampére Seamount, and a date of 31.2 ± 0.2 million years ago has been obtained for the Ampére-Coral Patch ridge. Both seamounts were probably islands in the past. The volcanic growth of the seamount was influenced by the wider tectonic regime, resulting in the east-northeast trending structure of the seamount. The tectonic regime would have favoured the ascent of magma from the Madeira hotspot away from its usual track.

In the present-day, the region of Coral Patch Seamount is a potential source for tsunamis including a transatlantic tsunami on March 31, 1761: an earthquake was recorded close to the seamount on July 11, 1915. In addition, the most common hypotheses for the source of the 1755 Lisbon earthquake localize it in the area between Coral Patch Seamount and Gorringe Bank.

Dredging has recovered volcanic rocks from the seamount, including volcanic breccia, hyaloclastites, and lavas, which occur both in the form of slabs and pillow lavas. The volcanic rocks are alkali basalts, basalts and hawaiites containing clinopyroxene, diopside and olivine phenocrysts and are heavily altered with the formation of palagonite and zeolites. Their geochemistry indicates that the magma forming them was influenced by crustal components. Nonvolcanic rocks include pelagic carbonates, biogenic carbonates generated by animal skeletons and foraminifera, limestones and iron-manganese oxides.

== Life ==
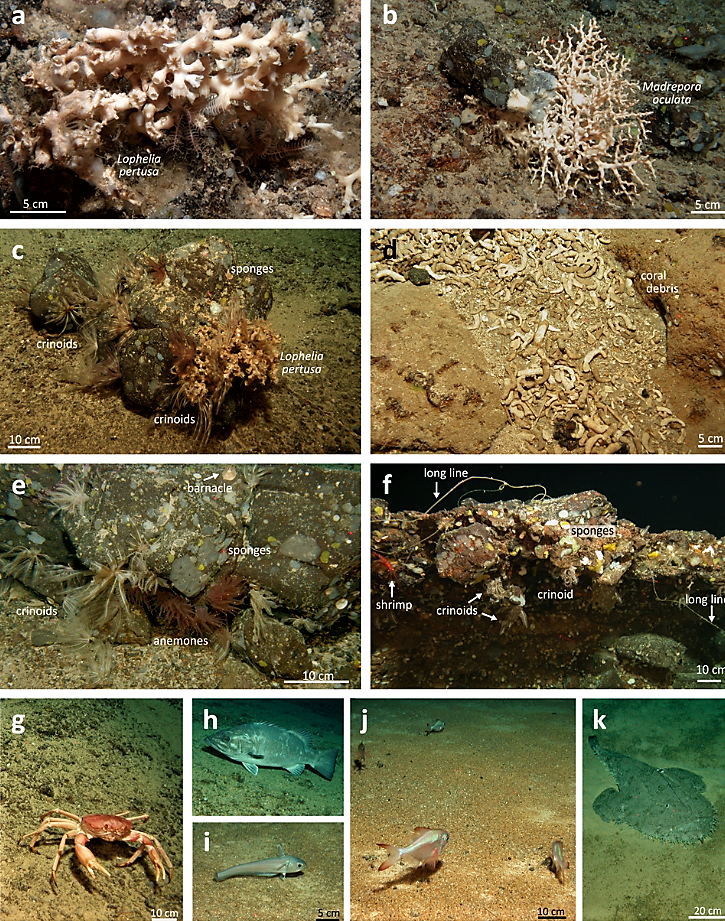
Examples of fauna observed at Coral Patch Seamount

Many seamounts are biodiversity hotspots, as they interact with ocean currents enhancing the biological productivity around them. In the case of the northeast Atlantic seamounts, deep ocean currents are diverted at the seamount inducing upwelling. Outcropping rocks permit the settlement of species that would not find suitable substrates on sediment covered seafloor.

Underwater video has identified a number of animals living on Coral Patch Seamount, but in general animals are rare and corals do not form large colonies. These include actinians, anemones, asteroids, barnacles, bivalves, (Note: A number of bivalve species have been first discovered on Coral Patch Seamount, including Ancistrobasis lavaleyei, Basilissopsis vanheugteni, Chrysallida intorta, Fusceulima coralensis, Fusceulima victorhensenae and Papuliscala lydiae. The gastropod Iphitus davidei was discovered on Coral Patch Seamount.) brachiopods, dendrophylliid corals, Eguchipsammia, Lophelia pertusa and Madrepora oculata corals, crinoids, echinoids, octocorals, and sponges, most of which are attached to bedrock. Crinoids and hydrozoans settle on corals. Mobile animals include annelid serpulids, the crab Mediterranean geryon, the fish Atlantic wreckfish, blackbellied angler, rattails and silver roughy, gastropods and shrimps. Most animals on Coral Patch Seamount appear to be suspension feeders.

The seamount is heavily fished. Underwater observations have found numerous fishing lines and other debris from human activity on Coral Patch Seamount. Fishing may be the reason why there are few animals on the seamount; a lack of nutrients may be another reason. Rocks dredged from Coral Patch Seamount feature evidence of endolithic microorganisms, i.e., microorganisms that live within the rock. This evidence may yield cues about the identification of past life on Mars, as the basaltic rocks could be a suitable environment.
