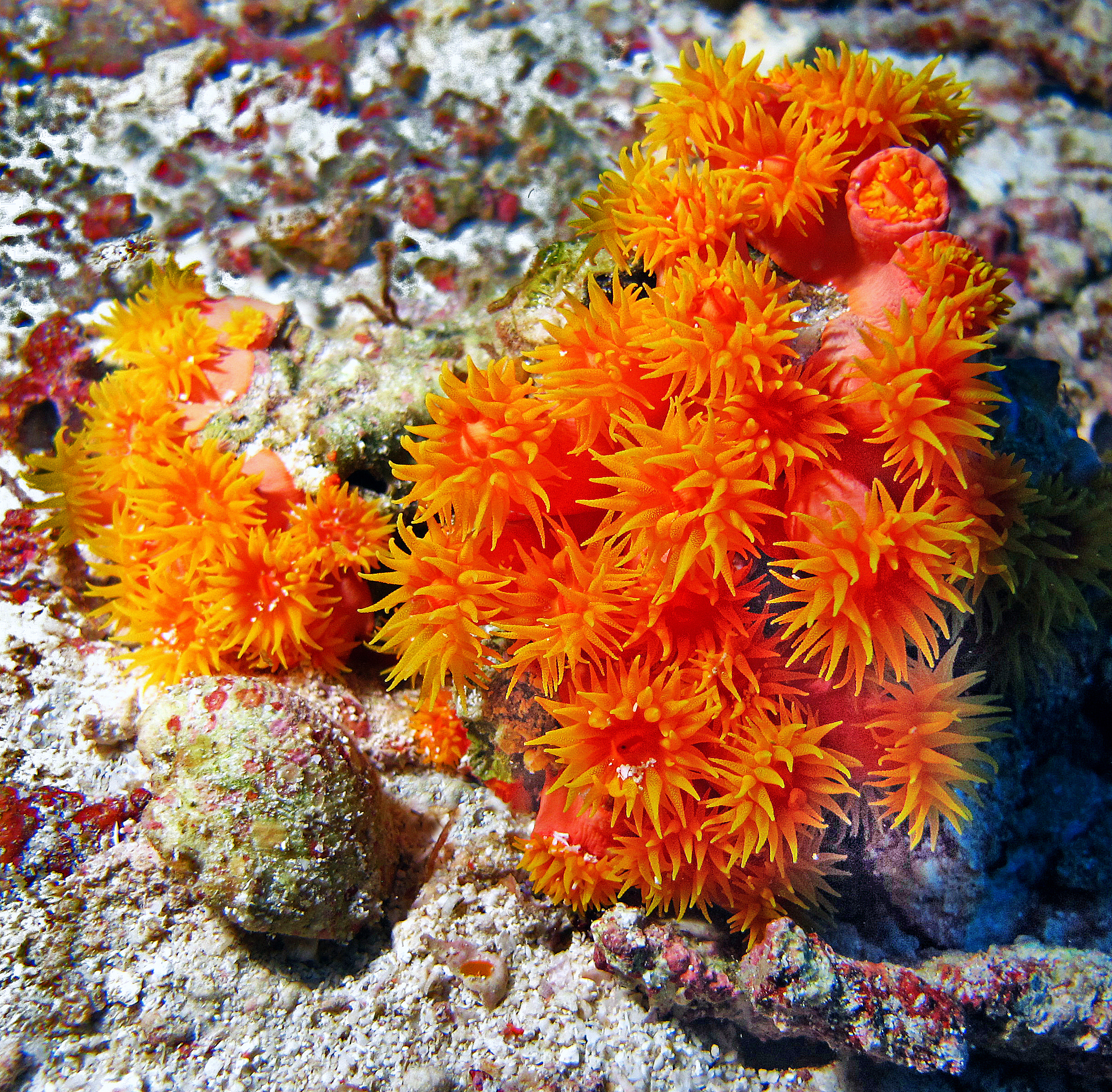
- Tubastrea faulkneri from Maldives

Scientific classification
- Domain: Eukaryota
- Kingdom: Animalia
- Phylum: Cnidaria
- Subphylum: Anthozoa
- Class: Hexacorallia
- Order: Scleractinia
- Family: Dendrophylliidae
- Genus: Tubastraea
- Species: T. faulkneri

Binomial name
- Tubastraea faulkneri Wells, 1982

= Tubastraea faulkneri =

Species of coral

Tubastraea faulkneri, common name Orange sun coral, is a species of large-polyp stony corals belonging to the family Dendrophylliidae. Other common names of this coral are Orange Cup Coral, Sun Coral, Orange Polyp Coral, Rose Sun Coral, Golden Cup Coral, Sun Flower Coral, and Tube Coral.

== Etymology ==
The species has been named faulkneri by the American paleontologist John West Wells in 1982 in honor of Douglas Faulkner, who collected and illustrated in color the specimen used for the description.

== Distribution ==
This species is mainly present in the Indo-Pacific Ocean, in Australian water and from the Philippines to the Galapagos Islands.

== Habitat ==
These large-polyp stony corals usually occurs in areas with a strong water flow and a high nutrient content, not necessarily related to the reef, at depths of 3 to 5 m.

== Description ==
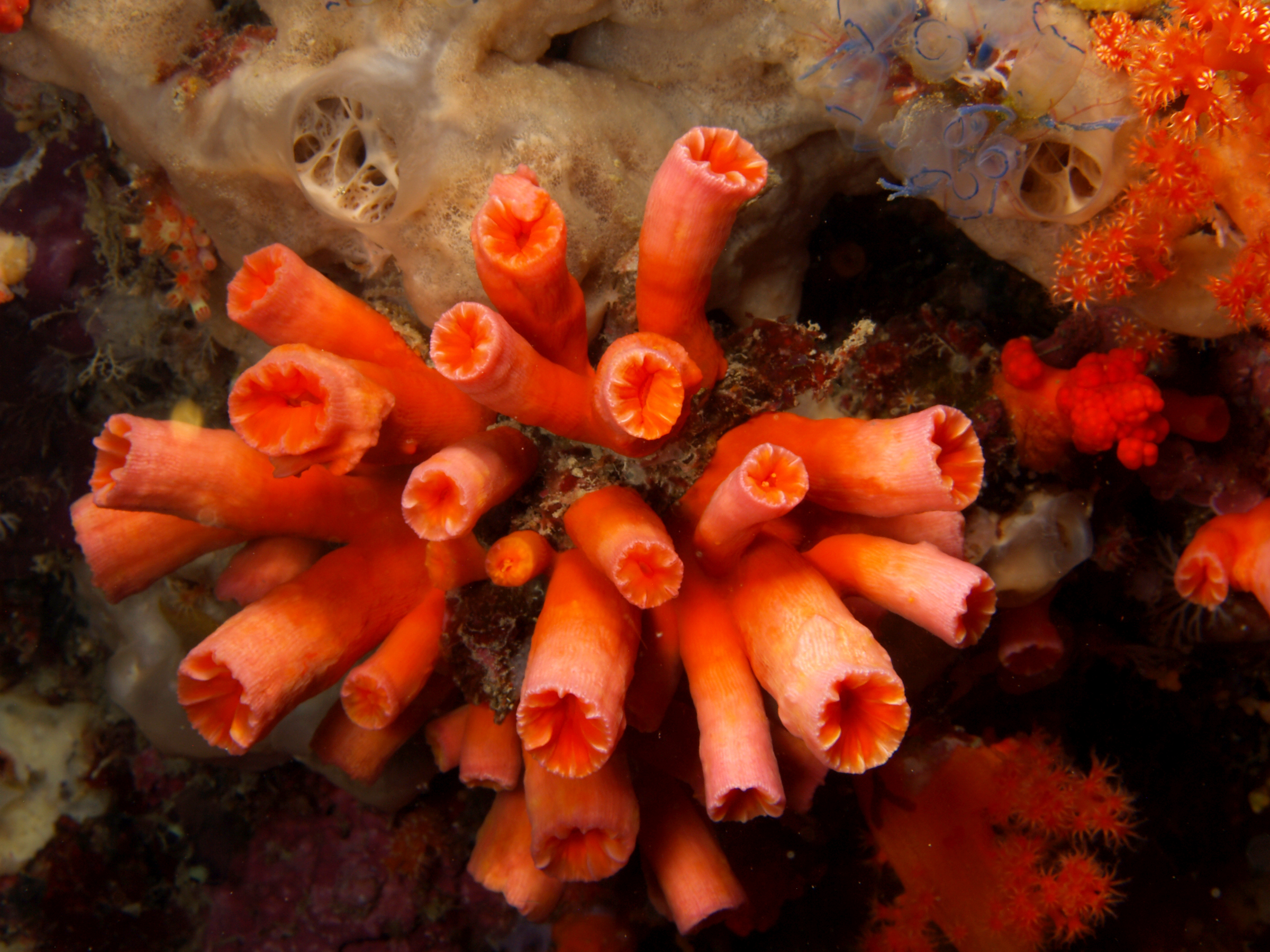
Tubastrea faulkneri with tentacles withdrawn

Tubastraea faulkneri is an encrusting coral that can become massive and strongly convex. The corallites of this species are covered with a porous tissue (coenosteum) with a vermicular appearance.

The calices have a diameter of 8–10 mm (0.31–0.39 in) and a depth of 5–8 mm (0.20–0.31 in). They are spaced of 5–15 mm (0.20–0.59 in) and rise of 3–8 mm (0.12–0.31 in) above the coenosteum. The tentacles of the polyps are bright yellow-orange, while the coenosteum and the center of the polyps are deeper orange. The surface of the coenosteum is swollen between calices.

They have four cycles of septa, with almost vertical internal margins dropping steeply towards the columella. The third cycle of septa barely reaches the edge of the calice and the fourth cycle is weakly developed, often incomplete and irregularly fused in the third cycle. The columella is deep, spongy, and often slightly compressed.

This species is rather similar to Tubastraea coccinea, but the latter species lacks of spacing between the corallites and usually they are united only at the base, while in T. faulkneri there is clearly a space between the polyps.

== Biology and behavior ==
These corals are slow growers and do not contribute to coral reef development (ahermatypic). Unlike many tropical corals, they are azooxanthellate or non-photosynthetic, meaning that they do not live in symbiosis with zooxanthellae in their tissues, allowing them to grow in complete darkness as long as they can capture enough food.

They extend their translucent tentacles during the late evening and the night, while during the day the tentacles are completely withdrawn and also the coenosteum is visible. They usually feed on plankton.

Like most corals, Tubastraea faulkneri reproduce asexually. They are hermaphrodites. Mature gametes are spawned through the mouth. The zygote develops into a planktonic planula larva.
