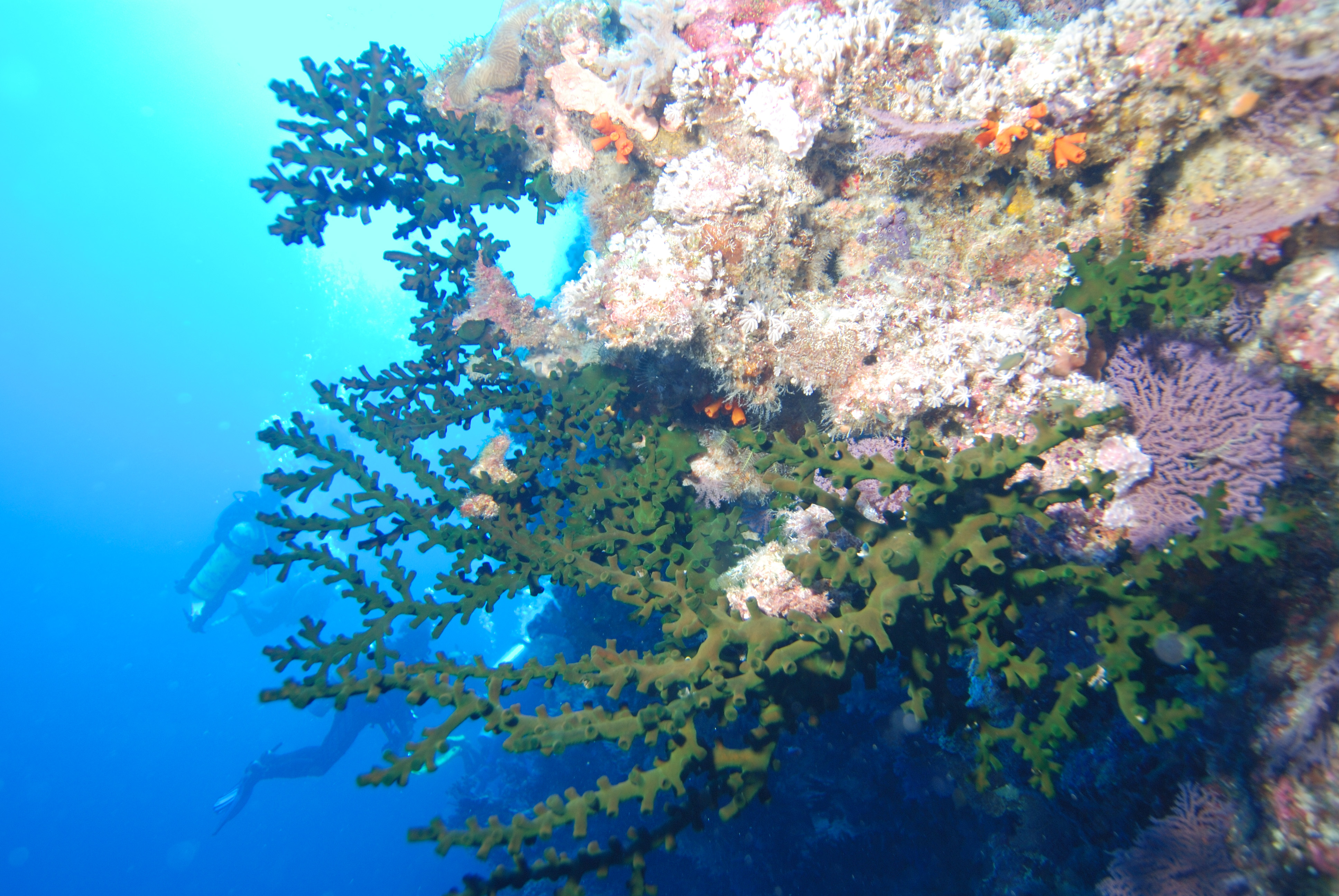

Scientific classification
- Kingdom: Animalia
- Phylum: Cnidaria
- Subphylum: Anthozoa
- Class: Hexacorallia
- Order: Scleractinia
- Family: Dendrophylliidae
- Genus: Tubastraea
- Species: T. micranthus

Binomial name
- Tubastraea micranthus (Ehrenberg, 1834)

Synonyms
- Tubastrea micrantha (Ehrenberg, 1834)

= Tubastraea micranthus =

Species of coral

Tubastraea micranthus, commonly known as the Black sun coral, is a coral from the Tubastraea genus, which comprises the sun corals. They have a dark green color and they grow and branch out in bush/tree like colonies. The habitat of T. micranthus ranges from the Red Sea to Madagascar, and into the Pacific as far as Fiji. It has been observed in waters as shallow as 4m to a depth of 138m in the new habitat. It is notable though, that in its native habitats Tubastraea micranthus has only been found at depths up to 50 meters and any discovered at lower depths are in invasive environments. Furthermore, there have been obscure sightings of Tubastraea micranthus in Korea.

== Description ==
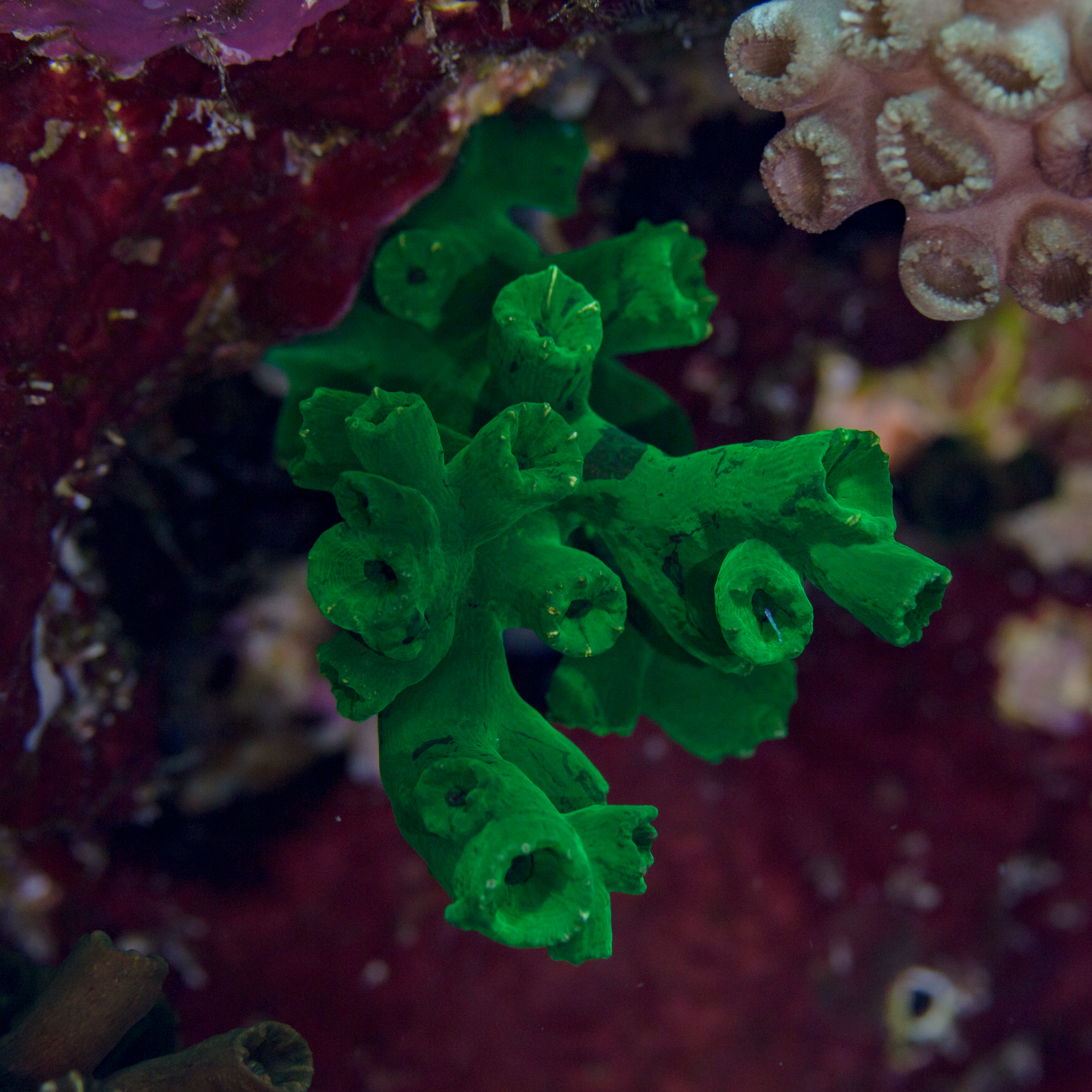
Detail view

=== Feeding ===
T. micranthus is an azooxanthellate coral, meaning the coral lacks zooxanthellae. T. micranthus instead gets energy from filter feeding. Additionally, T. micranthus has been observed eating larger planktonic prey, and even jellyfish, though this has not been confirmed as a regular part of its diet.

The polyps of T. micranthus expand up to 3 cm at night to capture planktonic organisms.

=== Reef building properties ===
While, most azooxanthellate corals are flexible and tend to flow with the currents, T. micranthus is rare in that it is a reef-building coral, strong enough to remain standing in areas that were blasted with dynamite. They are additionally notable for their relatively fast rate of growth of 4 cm per year, outpacing many azooxanthellate corals.

=== Reproduction ===
While the reproductive abilities of T. micranthus have not been confirmed directly, they are assumed to reproduce both sexually and asexually, because they share many traits with other Tubastraea species (specifically T. coccinea).

== Physical variation ==
T. micranthus are characteristically dark and color and grow vertically. Furthermore, T. micranthus located near the Philippines were found to have greater size and calcified skeletal strength compared to colonies found in the Red Sea. Additionally, T. micranthus found near the Philippines inhabited a greater range of depths (from 4–50m) than those from the Red sea (down to 12 meters).

Colonies in the Philippines could grow to 1m tall with and 15 cm diameter base stem, while colonies the tallest recorded T. micranthus In the Red sea is only 44 cm.

This discrepancy in size could be due to the environment, as T. micranthus found near the Philippines are generally in light exposed environments while colonies found in the Red Sea are generally found in dimly light environments. While light does not affect the growth of T. micranthus as they are azooxanthellate, it does affect the primary productivity of the plankton in the surrounding environment, providing more nutrients for T. micranthus indirectly.

== Invasiveness ==
In recent years Tubastraea micranthus has taken residency in the Gulf of Mexico, around the mouth of the Mississippi, where it has established itself as an invasive species. Following much the same path as T. coccinea it is beginning to outcompete the native sponges and algae. T. micranthus and T. coccinea do not compete with each other, though T. micranthus may have a slightly more aggressive tendency in space competition with sponges and algae. Additionally, though T. micranthus poses a major threat around the mouth of the Mississippi, it fails to dominate in naturally occurring reefs, leading to the belief that it fails to compete in these reefs.
