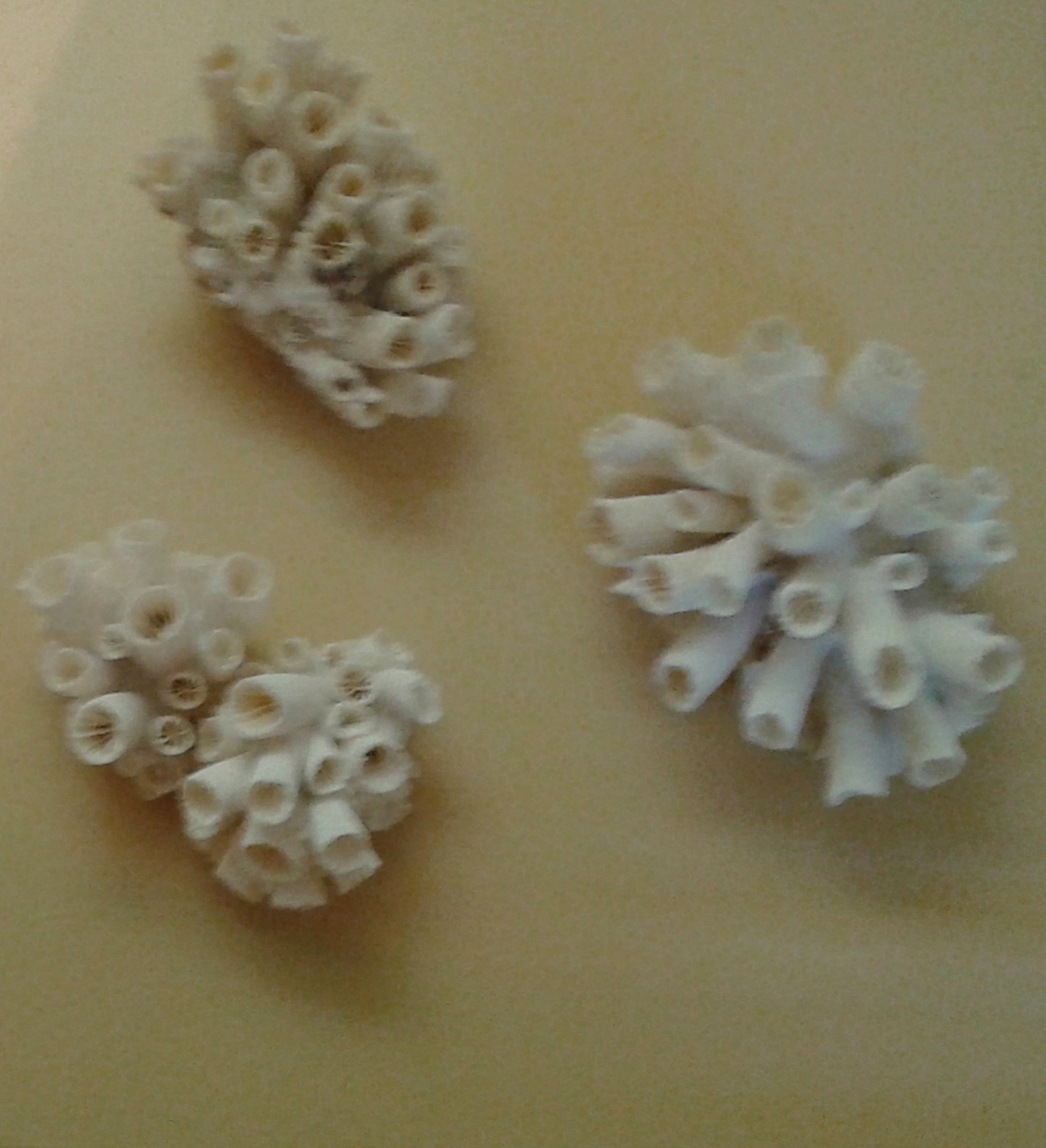

Scientific classification
- Kingdom: Animalia
- Phylum: Cnidaria
- Subphylum: Anthozoa
- Class: Hexacorallia
- Order: Scleractinia
- Family: Dendrophylliidae
- Genus: Tubastraea
- Species: T. tagusensis

Binomial name
- Tubastraea tagusensis Wells, 1982

= Tubastraea tagusensis =

Species of coral

Tubastraea tagusensis is a hard coral species in the family Dendrophylliidae. The species is azooxanthellate, thus does not need sunlight for development, and does not form reefs. It is native to the Galapagos Islands but has become invasive along the Atlantic coast of South America.

== Distribution ==
Tubastraea tagusensis was first described from the Galapagos Archipelago. Later it was also found in the Nicobar Islands, in Palau and Kuwait. It was first found to be invasive on the Brazilian coast in the 1980s on oil platforms north of Rio de Janeiro. The species can be found in shady places such as caves or beneath boulders on rocky shores. Species in this genus are usually native to the Indian and Pacific Oceans, and some are considered highly invasive along certain coastlines.

== Invasiveness ==
Due to their prolific spread, the species has locally caused severe ecological damage. It has expanded to the Southwest Atlantic Ocean, specifically along the Brazilian coastline where it has endangered other ecosystems such as mussel beds, the Amazon River's reef system, and rocky shores. It was likely introduced via biofouling on oil and gas platforms from the Indo-Pacific. Subsequent spread occurred through larval dispersal. Once the corals arrive at their new location, they can alter the structure and function of the benthic community. Within the invaded area, T. tagusensis prefers taking over reef walls more so than reef tops, displacing native benthic species. Because it thrives in warmer temperatures, it is predicted that rising ocean temperatures in the next few years will enable the species to expand further south, into the southwest Atlantic.

Part of the species' invasive capabilities seems to be based on the lack of any requirement for a specific substrate to grow. It also has an effective way of regenerating, which involves the growth of polyps from fragmentation into fully functioning corals. A study shows that temperature and food supply does not significantly limit the number and formation of regenerating polyps. Because T. tagusensis can grow so fast and has few predators in general, it frequently is able to cover 95% of the area it invades.

=== Invasion monitoring ===
Various approaches have been used to control the spread of the species. One method is known as the "wrapping method", where plastic and raffia sheets are used to severely limit the coral's food and oxygen supply, causing death after several days.
