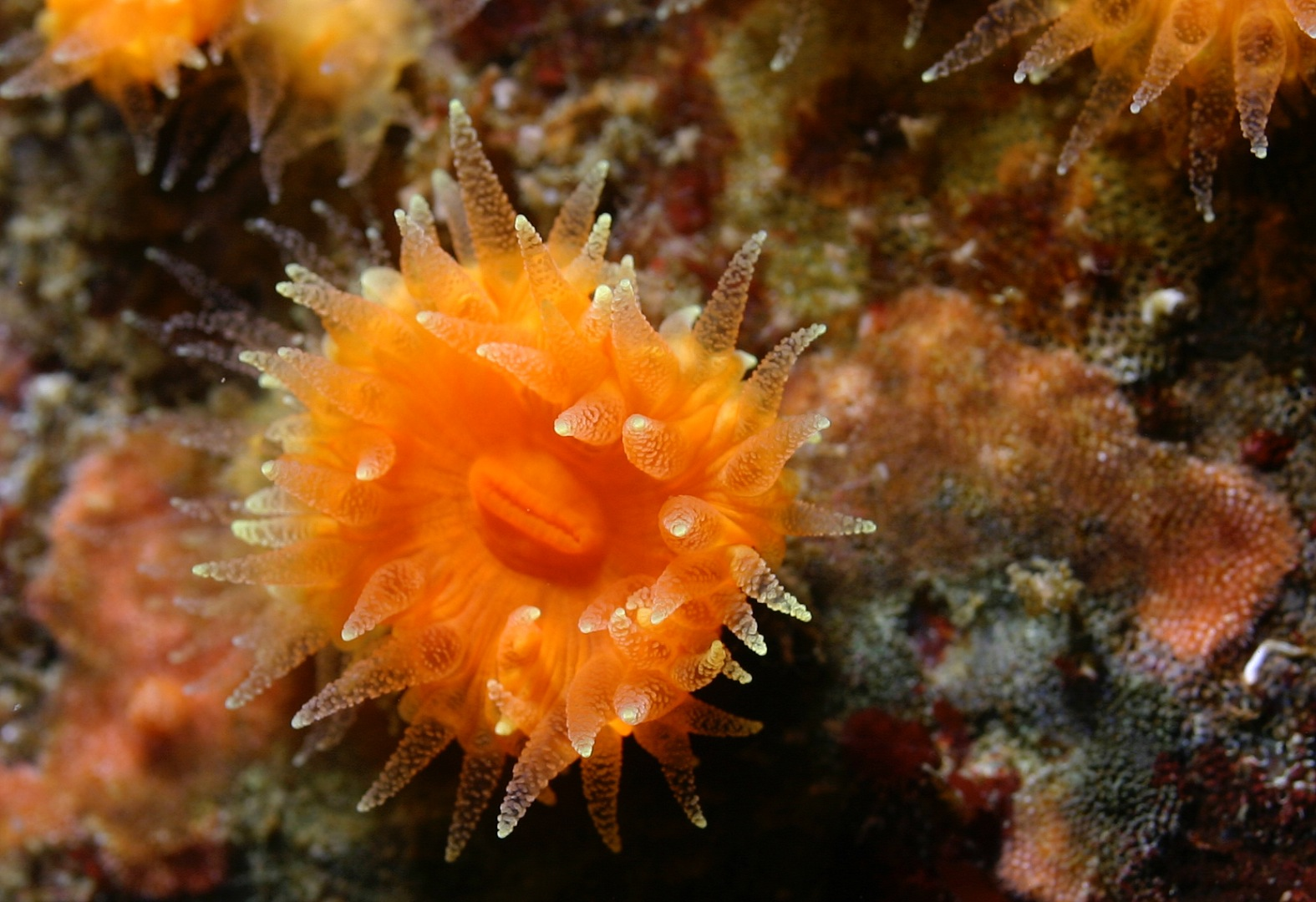

Scientific classification
- Kingdom: Animalia
- Phylum: Cnidaria
- Subphylum: Anthozoa
- Class: Hexacorallia
- Order: Scleractinia
- Family: Dendrophylliidae
- Genus: Balanophyllia
- Species: B. elegans

Binomial name
- Balanophyllia elegans Verrill, 1864

= Balanophyllia elegans =

Species of coral

Balanophyllia elegans, the orange coral or orange cup coral, is a species of solitary cup coral, a stony coral in the family Dendrophylliidae. It is native to the eastern Pacific Ocean. As an azooxanthellate species, it does not contain symbiotic dinoflagellates in its tissues in the way that most corals do.

== Description ==
B. elegans is a solitary species of cup coral. The polyps are mostly bright orange and about 1 cm (0.4 in) in diameter, though a yellow form also exists. The polyp is large and fleshy with tapering tentacles bearing groups of stinging cells. The polyp can almost completely retract into its stony corallite cup. This coral can be distinguished from the corallimorph Corynactis californica, which it somewhat resembles, by its stony skeleton, and from Caryophyllia alaskensis, another stony coral found in this habitat, by its brighter colour (C. alaskensis is beige). B. elegans often live in close proximity to each other, sometimes reaching around 500 per square meter.

== Distribution and habitat ==
The species is native to the western seaboard of North America, from British Columbia to Baja California. It occurs on rocky coasts from the low intertidal zone down to about 290 m (950 ft), but can also appear very close to the surface. It appreciates habitats with vigorous water movement, such as surge channels, and often grows in caves and under overhangs. This is because there is usually more nutrients in water that is constantly moving. It is often found living amongst kelp such as Macrocystis integrifolia.

== Biology ==
Being an azooxanthellate coral, that is, not containing symbiotic dinoflagellate algae that photosynthesise, B. elegans feeds on whatever the tentacles can catch, with the aid of their nematocysts (stinging cells) and spirocysts (cells containing hollow adhesive threads which coil around the prey). The mouth is large and slit-shaped, and it is possible that some prey is caught by use of the mesenteries in the gastrovascular cavity while opening the mouth wide, however its main prey is zooplankton caught by the tentacles. This coral can also extract dissolved organic carbon from sea water, and during the winter months, when there is a scarcity of zooplankton, this source of nutrition may be critical for the coral's survival. After latching onto a surface, the B. elegans spends the rest of its life there, which is typically around 2-3 weeks long. The B. elegans does not typically have any predators due to its strong skeleton and toxic defense system. It has stingers on the ends of its tentacles for defense. They evert spyrocysts (stinging cells) that produce tangles of sticky tubes that capture prey or attach to coral. Occasionally, the Leather Star eats B. elegans, but usually it will try for easier prey. They are not to be confused with another similar coral that lives in the same area, the Caryophyllia alaskensis. The way to distinguish these two is that the Caryophyllia alaskensis is beige color while theB. elegans is orange. A filamentous, blue-green photosynthetic bacterium or alga (cyanobacteria or cyanophyte) can inhabit the skeletal structure of the orange cup coral, causing a purple-red hue in the bare skeleton.

The sexes are separate in this coral. Fertilization takes place inside the female's gastrovascular cavity, and the larvae are brooded there. They are later released as worm-like orange larvae and settle nearby. This process usually happens in the spring and summer. The process is strictly sexual, which is rare for scleractinia like the B. elegans.
