= Eguchipsammia cornucopia =

Scientific classification
- Kingdom: Animalia
- Phylum: Cnidaria
- Subphylum: Anthozoa
- Class: Hexacorallia
- Order: Scleractinia
- Family: Dendrophylliidae
- Genus: Eguchipsammia
- Species: E. cornucopia

Binomial name
- Eguchipsammia cornucopia (De Pourtalès, 1871)

Species of coral

Eguchipsammia cornucopia is a species of coral, described by Louis François de Pourtalès in 1871
