= Buccinum oblitum =

Scientific classification
- Kingdom: Animalia
- Phylum: Mollusca
- Class: Gastropoda
- Subclass: Caenogastropoda
- Order: Neogastropoda
- Family: Buccinidae
- Genus: Buccinum
- Species: B. oblitum

Binomial name
- Buccinum oblitum Sykes, 1911

Species of gastropod

Buccinum oblitum is a species of sea snail, a marine gastropod mollusk in the family Buccinidae, the true whelks.

== Description ==
The shell is up to 20 mm high, solid, with 5-6 moderately convex whorls and a conical spire. The last whorl is about 70% of total height. Protoconch of one smooth, mucronate whorl. Teleoconch is with a variably developed sculpture consisting of spiral cords and threads, and slightly flexuous or straight axial folds. There are usually three cords on the early spire whorls, rather flat and as broad as the interspaces, later the second-order spiral threads are intercalated. The main spiral cords tend to form small knobs at their intersections with the axial folds, which are narrower than the interspace and may be wanting on part or whole of the spire. Body whorl is somewhat constricted around the canal, which is not delimited by a ridge. Aperture is oval, merging into a broad and short siphonal canal. Outer lip is slightly thickened, smooth inside. Parietal and columellar edge are appressed, forming a thin callus which hardly extends over the previous whorl. Colour is whitish with diffuse, pale brown flames and blotches.

== Distribution ==
Distribution of Buccinum oblitum include:

- Eastern Atlantic, from the Faroes to southwestern Ireland in 300–1000 m.
- Strait of Gibraltar in 362–526 m.
- Gorringe Ridge seamount, moderately common in 155–1040 m.
- Ampère and Seine seamounts, rare in 235–325 m.

This apparently disjunct distribution is puzzling, but no appreciable morphological difference can be detected.

The type locality stated by Sykes (1911) is "Porcupine" 1869 sta. 65, which is North of the Hebrides, 61º10'N, 02º21'W, 345 fathoms. The lectotype in USNM is reported (Bouchet & Warén, 1985, and current USNM catalogue) to be from sta. 55 which is 60º04'N, 06º19'W, 605 fathoms.

== Ecology ==
The type of larval development is direct (non-planktotrophic) inferred from paucispiral protoconch.
