= Eguchipsammia serpentina =

Scientific classification
- Kingdom: Animalia
- Phylum: Cnidaria
- Subphylum: Anthozoa
- Class: Hexacorallia
- Order: Scleractinia
- Family: Dendrophylliidae
- Genus: Eguchipsammia
- Species: E. serpentina

Binomial name
- Eguchipsammia serpentina (Vaughan, 1907)

Species of cnidarian

Eguchipsammia serpentina, also called serpentine cup coral, is a coral in the family Dendrophylliidae endemic to Hawai'i.
