= Balanopsammia =

Scientific classification
- Kingdom: Animalia
- Phylum: Cnidaria
- Subphylum: Anthozoa
- Class: Hexacorallia
- Order: Scleractinia
- Family: Dendrophylliidae
- Genus: Balanopsammia; Ocana & Brito, 2013
- Species: B. wirtzi

Binomial name
- Balanopsammia wirtzi Ocana & Brito, 2013

Genus of corals

Balanopsammia is a monotypic genus of corals in the family of tree-leaved corals, Dendrophylliidae. It is represented by a single species, Balanopsammia wirtzi, which occurs in Atlantic waters around the Cape Verde islands of Santiago and Sal. Both the genus and the species were first named and described in 2013 by Ocaña & Brito. The genus name refers to the long confusion in the identification of the species as a Balanophyllia. The species name wirtzi refers to Peter Wirtz who collected several marine species in the East Atlantic.
