= Tubastraea floreana =

Conservation status
- Critically Endangered (IUCN 3.1)

Scientific classification
- Kingdom: Animalia
- Phylum: Cnidaria
- Subphylum: Anthozoa
- Class: Hexacorallia
- Order: Scleractinia
- Family: Dendrophylliidae
- Genus: Tubastraea
- Species: T. floreana

Binomial name
- Tubastraea floreana Wells, 1982

Species of coral

Tubastraea floreana is a species of coral in the genus Tubastraea, a group of coral species known as sun corals. This coral species is a non-reef building coral without a symbiotic relationship with zooxanthellae and are thus heterotrophs. They are endemic to the Galapagos Islands and were last observed in 2004 on Isla Gardner near Floreana island. The species is listed as critically endangered by the IUCN Red List, and endangered by the National Marine Fisheries Service due to climate change and tourism that threaten its already low population.

== Anatomy ==
T. floreana has pink polyps where the coralites of the polyps are cylindrical and 4-6 millimeters wide which is smaller than other Tubastraea species and protrude 2-10 millimeters from the base of the coralite. Within the coralite, 24 skeletal elements of the coral called septae extend radially around the central column called the columella which is described as a rudimentary columella. However, only 12 of the septae actually reach the columella. The septae are arranged hexamerally with three cycles (primary, secondary, and tertiary), meaning they are radially symmetrical in multiples of six around the columella. The septae cycles have different sizes from the largest being primary and the smallest being tertiary. The characteristics of the septae having three sizes and having smaller corallites differentiate it from other Tubastraea species from the Galapagos islands.

== Life cycle ==
As of the 2020 5-year review of the endangered species designation by the National Marine Fisheries Service, there was currently no research on the reproductive or developmental cycle of T. floreana, however it is possible that they have similar reproduction characteristics as other Tubastraea species who reproduce both asexually and sexually.

== Diet ==
While there is currently no research concerning the diet of T. floreana, the diets of other species in the Tubastraea genus are known. Tubastraea species are heterotrophs and consume zooplankton in the water column for food. Additionally, it is known that T. floreana does not have a symbiotic relationship with photosynthetic zooxanthellae unlike most corals in the Scleractinia family, so they do not obtain nutrition from the zooxanthellae's photosynthesis.

== Distribution ==
Map of the Galapagos Islands Chain with Island labels. Tubastraea floreana has been observed at Caleta Iguana on Isabela island, Santiago island, Pinzõn island, Floreana, and Española.

T. floreana is endemic to the Galapagos Islands and has not been observed outside of the island chain unlike other Tubastraea species which have been observed in a variety of locations, some of whom are invasive. T. floreana has been observed at least six locations on four islands of the Galapagos chain in the past, however after the 1982-1983 El Niño–Southern Oscillation (ENSO) these populations decreased substantially with T. floreana not being observed again until the 1990s with three colonies on Cousin's Rock. Before the ENSO in 1982-1983, it is predicted that T. floreana was relatively common since it was commonly found without much survey work. These colonies were observed until 2001. Later T. floreana were observed again in 2004 on Isla Gardner, an island near the Floreana island. According to the second status review of the endangered species designation by the National Marine Fisheries Service in 2020, this was the last time T. floreana was observed anywhere within the Galápagos archipelago. However, in the first status review to add T. floreana to the endangered species list in 2014, Dwayne Meadows reported they received personal communication from Stuart Bank reporting T. floreana at one site recently. In any case, the most recent literature finds very low abundance of T. floreana with a very limited geographic area and genetic diversity, leaving T. floreana at high risk of extinction.

=== Habitat ===
The habitat of T. floreana has been previously observed to be on the roofs of caves and rock overhangs 2-46 meters deep in the areas off of the Cousin's Rock, Santiago, and Isla Gardner islands.

== Conservation ==
T. floreana is listed as endangered and critically endangered under the Endangered Species Act and the IUCN Red List respectively. In 2007, T. floreana was added to the IUCN Red List as a critically endangered species. In 2015, T. floreana was first listed as endangered by the National Marine Fisheries Service.

=== Threats ===
The primary threats to T. floreana is ocean acidification, ENSOs, tourism, and possibly predation by sea urchins. The acidification of the ocean due to climate change will limit Galápagos corals' ability to deposit calcium carbonate as their skeleton, thus limiting their survival. ENSOs, which cause warming in the eastern Pacific ocean including the Galápagos islands, also negatively impact T. floreana, with the population estimated to have declined by 80% since the ENSO of 1982-1983, with a second following in 1997-1998. Due to climate change, it is predicted that these ENSOs will become more common, putting corals at higher risk of extinction. It is not known exactly how tourism has impacted T. floreana, but tourism has had negative impacts such as invasive species introductions and oil spills on other corals that limited their recovery. The sea urchin Eucidaris galapagensis is known to prevent coral survival, settlement, and recovery for other coral species in the Galápagos, and may have similar impact on T. floreana. Due to the low population of T. floreana, it also has low genetic diversity, making it harder for it to adapt to changing conditions, increasing its extinction risk.

=== Conservation efforts ===
The listing of T. floreana as an Endangered Species Act restricts its import and export from the United States, however beyond that, it does not have much impact since its habitat is in foreign waters. There are also international conservation efforts for T. floreana such as its inclusion for international trade restriction under the Convention on International Trade in Endangered Species of Wild Fauna and Flora. T. floreana is also protected by Ecuadorian conservation laws including the Special Regime Law for the Conservation and Sustainable Development in the Province of the Galápagos which protected the Galápagos marine reserve and regulates fisheries, waste, immigration, residency, and agriculture to minimize negative impacts to the surrounding environment.

== Future research ==
To gain a better understanding of the species and its population trends, the 5-year status review of T. floreana recommended further surveys to observe T. floreana in the Galápagos to better guide conservation efforts.
