= Cladopsammia manuelensis =

Scientific classification
- Kingdom: Animalia
- Phylum: Cnidaria
- Subphylum: Anthozoa
- Class: Hexacorallia
- Order: Scleractinia
- Family: Dendrophylliidae
- Genus: Cladopsammia
- Species: C. manuelensis

Binomial name
- Cladopsammia manuelensis (Chevalier, 1966)

Species of coral

Cladopsammia manuelensis, more commonly known as Sun coral or Cup coral, is an azooxanthellate, "true" coral species, and stony coral species. Cladopsammia manuelensis is present in marine environments only and is home to the deep and shallow waters of the Atlantic and Indian Oceans.

== Anatomy and ecology ==
Cladopsammia manuelensis are described as having a dull olive to orangey body with orange and yellow shaded tentacles extruding from the polyp. The dull body of the coral is attached to a hard substrate and the polyp of the coral contracts and retracts from the body to feed. C. manuelensis is an azooxanthellate coral species, meaning they do not contain symbiotic zooxanthella and instead derive nourishment through suspension feeding. C. manuelensis is also a part of the order Scleractinia and therefore is a stony coral species, which simply means they have a hard skeleton body. Because of their hard skeletal bodies, stony coral are essential, not but exclusively, reef builders in deep-sea coral reef habitats.

== Distribution and habitat ==
Over the last decade, Cladopsammia manuelensis has increased in abundance both in depth and geographically, especially in the Caribbean. Cladopsammia manuelensis was previously believed to only inhabit the deep sea but was recently discovered in shallow waters.

=== Geographical distribution ===
Cladopsammia manuelensis can be found in the Atlantic and Indian Oceans, and have been observed in a variety of tropical regions off the coasts of Africa and the Americas, where it can mostly be found in the Caribbean. More specifically Cladopsammia manuelensis has been spotted near Curaçao, Aruba, Haiti, the Dominican Republic, and Puerto Rico. But notably was not found in the Bonaire and Sint Eustatius regions despite the resemblance between the environments of Curaçao and Bonaire and their close proximity of 40 km. Recently, Cladopsammia manuelensis has also been located off the coast of south Florida, specifically, in the Pourtalès Terrace and Florida Straits areas. Several species of the genus Cladopsammia are also being discovered near the coasts of Korea, Japan, and the Marquesas Islands in French Polynesia but C. manuelensis has yet to be located in those regions. Nevertheless, the possibility of coming across C. manuelensis in such a region would not be staggering, as much of the ocean has yet to be explored and C. manuelensis has exhibited an ability to adapt and thrive in different environments.

=== Depth distribution ===
Cladopsammia manuelensis has been observed at a wide range of depths and has been located in both shallow-water reefs and deep-sea reefs, this is a rare ecological trait specific to the Dendrophylliidae family. Since C. manuelensis is an azooxanthellate coral species, they thrive in deep-sea environments, however, due to their versatility, C. manuelensis have been newly discovered to inhabit some shallow water coral reef environments as well. The current depth range for this species in the Atlantic Ocean is 4–366 m: off the western coast of Africa the depth range is 55–150 m and off the coast of the Americas the depth range is 4–366 m. While the depth range of this species off the southeastern coast of Africa is 43–110 m in the Indian Ocean. However, Cladopsammia manuelensis has also been located in shallower reefs ranging from 4–19 m near the Dominican Republic.

== Feeding and diet ==
Like most corals, C. manuelensis are suspension feeders, however, unlike most corals, C. manuelensis do not contain symbiotic zooxanthella. Since they are sessile and can't rely on the sun for nutrition, C. manuelensis, rely on particles suspended in the water column for their nourishment. C. manuelensis capture detritus by sticking out the tentacles of their polyp, which can be contracted and retracted from the body for feeding, and collecting whatever lands on them. Through the method of suspension feeding, they are able to catch some phytoplankton, amphipods, copepods, and other zooplankton.

== Reproduction ==
Cladopsammia manuelensis reproduce sexually and asexually, using larval dispersal to reproduce sexually and regenerative abilities to reproduce asexually. Larval dispersal is when organisms release their larvae into the water column, allowing them to spread to new habitats, avoid competition, and become more genetically diverse. Cladopsammia manuelensis reproduce asexually through budding, which is easy to tell based on how they appear when detached from their hard substrate.

== Conservation ==
Coral species are currently being destroyed by ocean acidification, rising water temperatures, pollution, overfishing, and destructive fishing practices, but there are ways to protect C. manuelensis and other coral species from these threats.

=== Ways everyone can help everyday ===
A big but simple way to help eliminate the threats against both coral species and other aspects of the planet is to recycle and not litter. Recycling and disposing of trash properly keeps garbage from making its way into the ocean, rivers, estuaries, lakes, and streams, which prevents harmful chemicals and debris from polluting the planet. Another easy way to help protect corals is to save energy and use eco-friendly modes of transportation, both of which limit the use of greenhouse gases and therefore reduce the advance of ocean acidification and rising water temperatures. Reducing water runoff and the use of fertilizer can also make a big impact on the health of coral species, by preventing harmful chemicals from making their way into the ocean and waterways. The easiest thing to do to help protect coral species from ocean acidification, rising water temperatures, pollution, overfishing, and destructive fishing practices is, to spread the word about the harmful impacts they have on corals. This unsurprisingly is one of the most beneficial ways to help protect the planet and corals since spreading awareness contributes to the understanding of ways to preserve the planet, as well as, contributes to funding for conservation and research.

=== Ways to help if coming in contact with coral ===
If interested in collecting coral for an aquarium, it's best to not buy the real thing, live coral. However, if insistent on having live coral in the accompanying water-type aquarium, then it is suggested to ensure the coral is being collected and transported in a sustainable and ethical approach. If visiting a coral reef or an area with coral species avoid anchoring on top of them and touching the coral at all as coral is brittle and contact will damage or kill the coral and other organisms living in or around them. And lastly, if visiting a coral reef or an area near coral species, wear reef-safe sunscreen, some ingredients in sunscreen will kill and or harm coral species and the organisms that live in or around them.
