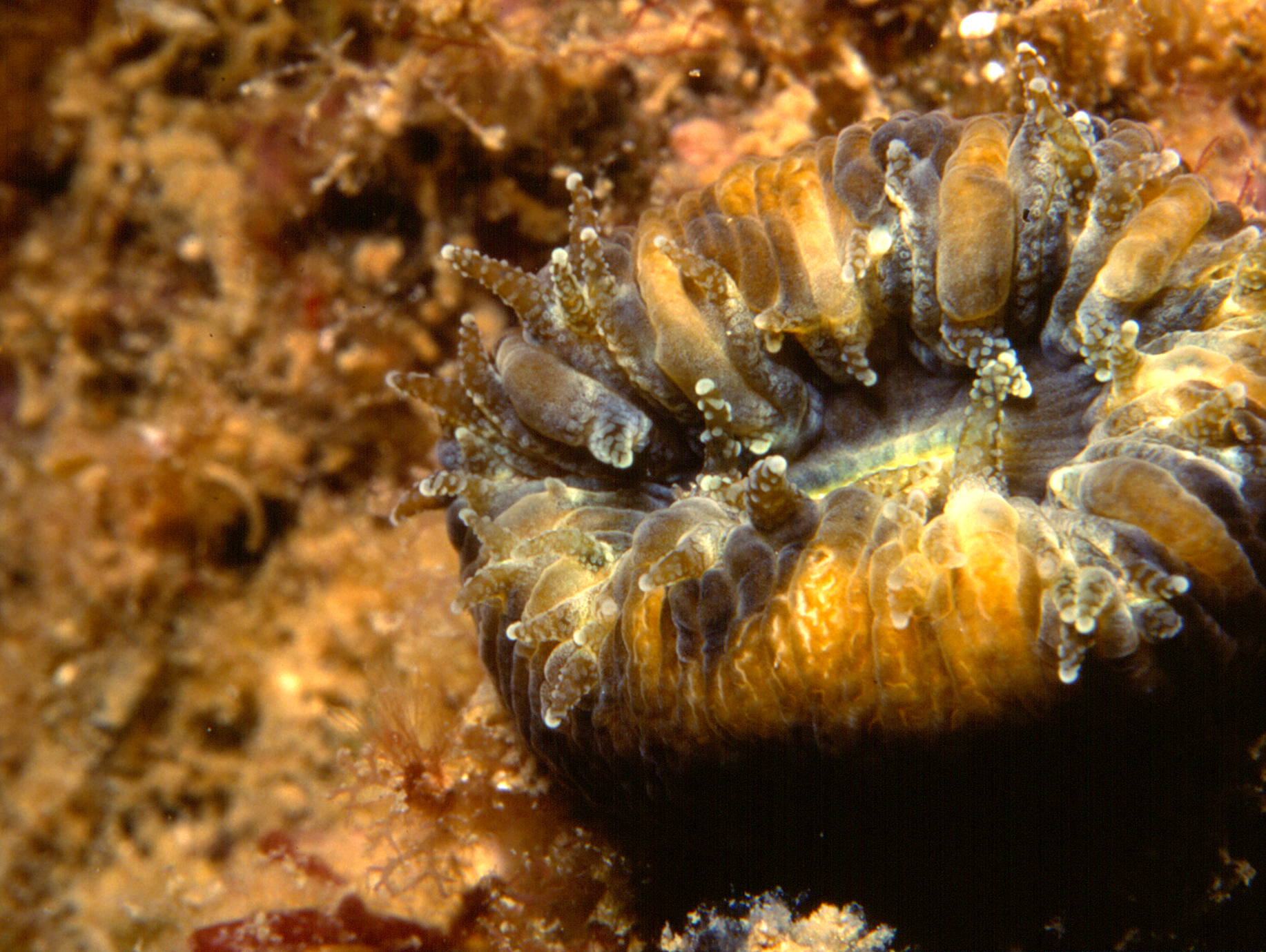

Conservation status
- Vulnerable (IUCN 3.1)

Scientific classification
- Kingdom: Animalia
- Phylum: Cnidaria
- Subphylum: Anthozoa
- Class: Hexacorallia
- Order: Scleractinia
- Family: Dendrophylliidae
- Genus: Balanophyllia
- Species: B. europaea

Binomial name
- Balanophyllia europaea (Risso, 1826)

Synonyms
- Caryophyllia europaea Risso, 1826; Desmophyllum stellaria Ehrenberg, 1834

= Balanophyllia europaea =

Species of coral

Balanophyllia europaea, called also scarlet coral or pig-tooth coral, is a small species of stony coral in the family Dendrophylliidae.

== Description ==
Pig-tooth corals are solitary hard corals with an oval shape. They grow to 4 to 6 cm in diameter and 2 cm in height. The body colour goes from light brown to green-brown, the polyp has almost transparent beaded tentacles which can have some red to yellow spots due to the presence of symbiotic micro-algae.

== Distribution & habitat ==
This small madrepore is only found in the Mediterranean Sea. It prefers shallow and bright underwater areas and usually fixes itself on hard substrate like rocks, shells or other hard materials as deep as 50 m (160 ft).

== Biology ==
This species likes shallow places because it is a photophilous species, that means it needs sunlight to sustain its symbiotic micro-algae.

B. europaeas are simultaneous hermaphrodites and brooders that reproduce sexually once a year. After fertilization takes place in May and April, B. europaeas release their larvae in September and October. The 3 mm (0.12 in) long planula larvae then settle after an average of seven days and begin to metamorphose into polyps and eventually full grown B. europaeas.
