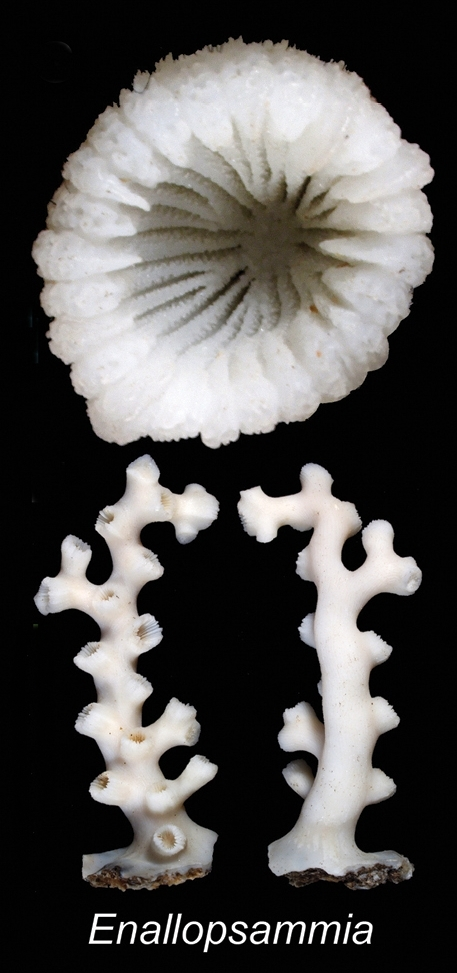
- Enallopsammia rostrata

Scientific classification
- Domain: Eukaryota
- Kingdom: Animalia
- Phylum: Cnidaria
- Class: Hexacorallia
- Order: Scleractinia
- Family: Dendrophylliidae
- Genus: Enallopsammia; Sismonda, 1871

= Enallopsammia =

Genus of corals

Enallopsammia is a genus of cnidarians belonging to the family Dendrophylliidae.

The genus has cosmopolitan distribution.

Species:

- Enallopsammia profunda (Pourtalès, 1868)
- Enallopsammia pusilla (Alcock, 1902)
- Enallopsammia reflexa (Michelotti, 1847)
- Enallopsammia rostrata (Pourtalès, 1878)
