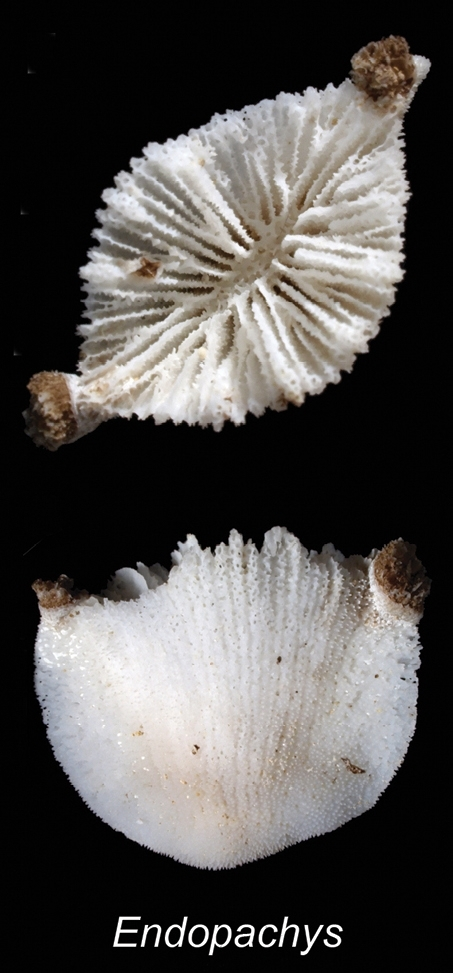
- Endopachys grayi

Scientific classification
- Domain: Eukaryota
- Kingdom: Animalia
- Phylum: Cnidaria
- Class: Hexacorallia
- Order: Scleractinia
- Family: Dendrophylliidae
- Genus: Endopachys; Lonsdale, 1845

= Endopachys =

Genus of corals

Endopachys is a genus of corals belonging to the family Dendrophylliidae.

The species of this genus are found in Pacific, Atlantic and Indian Ocean.

Species:

- Endopachys alatum Lonsdale, 1845
- Endopachys alticostatum Conrad, 1855
- Endopachys bulbosa Cairns & Zibrowius, 1997
- Endopachys expansum Conrad, 1855
- Endopachys grayi Milne Edwards & Haime, 1848
- Endopachys lonsdalei Vaughan, 1900
- Endopachys maclurii (Lea, 1833)
- Endopachys minutum Vaughan, 1900
- Endopachys shaleri Vaughan, 1900
- Endopachys tampae Wells, 1975
- Endopachys triangulare Conrad, 1855
