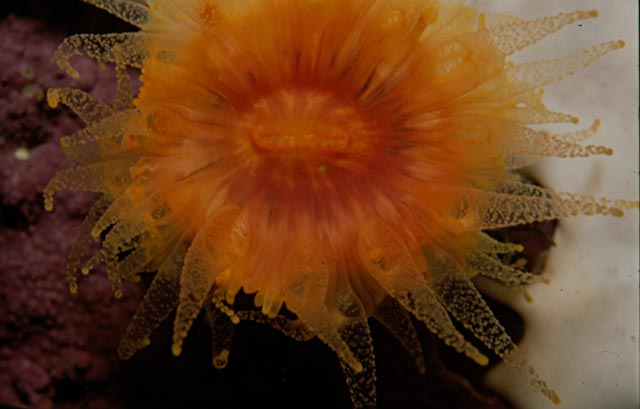

Scientific classification
- Kingdom: Animalia
- Phylum: Cnidaria
- Subphylum: Anthozoa
- Class: Hexacorallia
- Order: Scleractinia
- Family: Dendrophylliidae
- Genus: Balanophyllia
- Species: B. bonaespei

Binomial name
- Balanophyllia bonaespei van der Horst, 1938

= Balanophyllia bonaespei =

Species of coral

Balanophyllia bonaespei is a species of solitary cup coral, a stony coral in the family Dendrophylliidae. It is an azooxanthellate species that does not contain symbiotic dinoflagellates in its tissues as most corals do.

== Description ==
Cup corals are solitary hard corals which superficially resemble orange sea anemones. They grow to 1–2 cm in diameter. They have almost transparent beaded tentacles.

== Distribution ==
This species is known from Saldanha Bay to East London off the South African coast, and lives from 5 to 150 metres (16 to 492 ft) under water.

== Ecology ==
This species is often found in caves or under dark overhangs.
