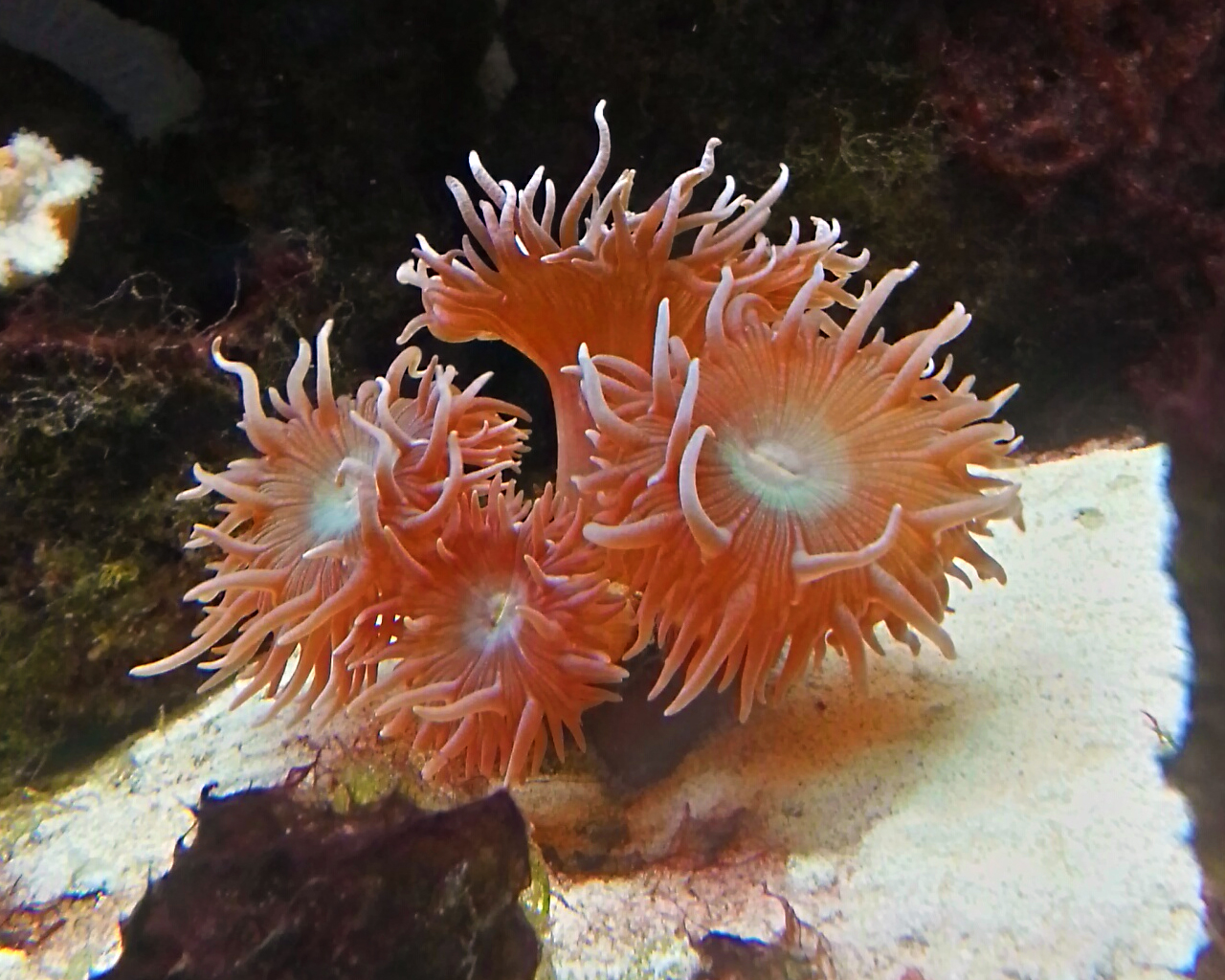
- Colony of Duncanopsammia axifuga

Conservation status
- Least Concern (IUCN 3.1)

Scientific classification
- Kingdom: Animalia
- Phylum: Cnidaria
- Subphylum: Anthozoa
- Class: Hexacorallia
- Order: Scleractinia
- Family: Dendrophylliidae
- Genus: Duncanopsammia; Wells, 1936
- Species: D. axifuga

Binomial name
- Duncanopsammia axifuga Milne-Edwards & Haime, 1848

= Duncanopsammia =

Whisker coral

Genus of corals

Duncanopsammia is a monotypic genus of stony corals. It is represented by the single species, Duncanopsammia axifuga, commonly called whisker coral, duncanops coral, or simply duncan coral. Individual polyps are fairly large with round skeletal bases (corallites) 10–14 millimetres (0.39–0.55 in) in diameter and larger central discs from which multiple tentacles radiate; the polyps form a structure branching at irregular intervals to form a large colony.

== Habitat and distribution ==
D. axifuga inhabits sandy and rocky seabeds in Australia and the South China Sea where it can be found growing in colonies of branching or clustered individuals near the foundation of the reef. It typically grows at depths up to 30 metres (98 ft).

== Description ==
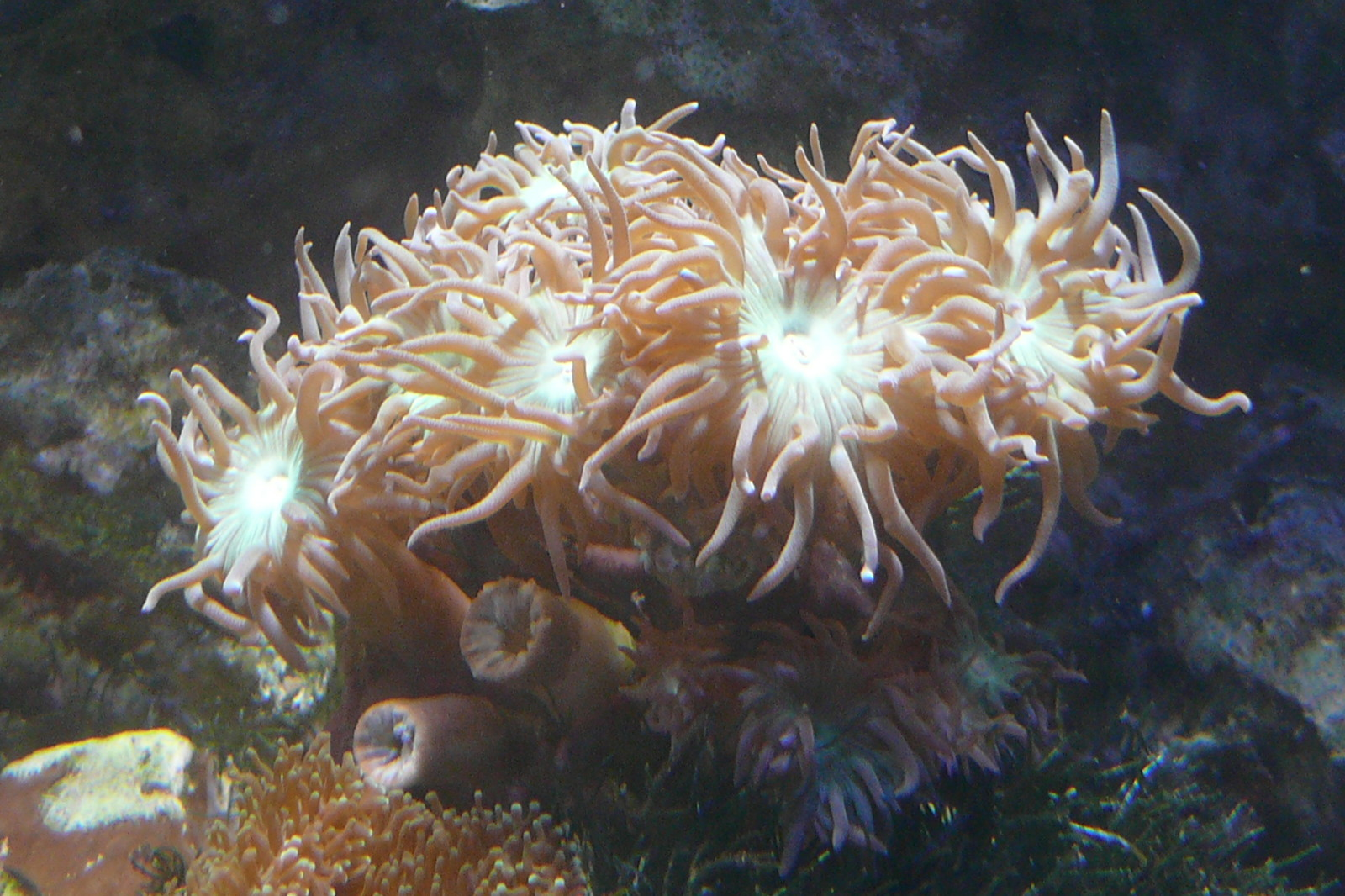
Colony of Duncan coral, with light brown polyps

D. axifuga has large polyps that possess a wide, flat, circular disk that is usually light brown or green in color, and is usually patterned by faint stripes or darker or lighter color. The tentacles of an average polyp are thin and are usually colored brown or green similar to the disk color. The tentacles have rows of stinging cells called nematocysts, and generally produce a sticky sensation when touched. An individual polyp resembles a miniature sea anemone although the diameter of each polyp can only reach a diameter of 2–3 centimetres (0.79–1.18 in). The polyps can open and contract depending on stimuli including to move captured prey to the central mouth.

== Aquarium trade ==
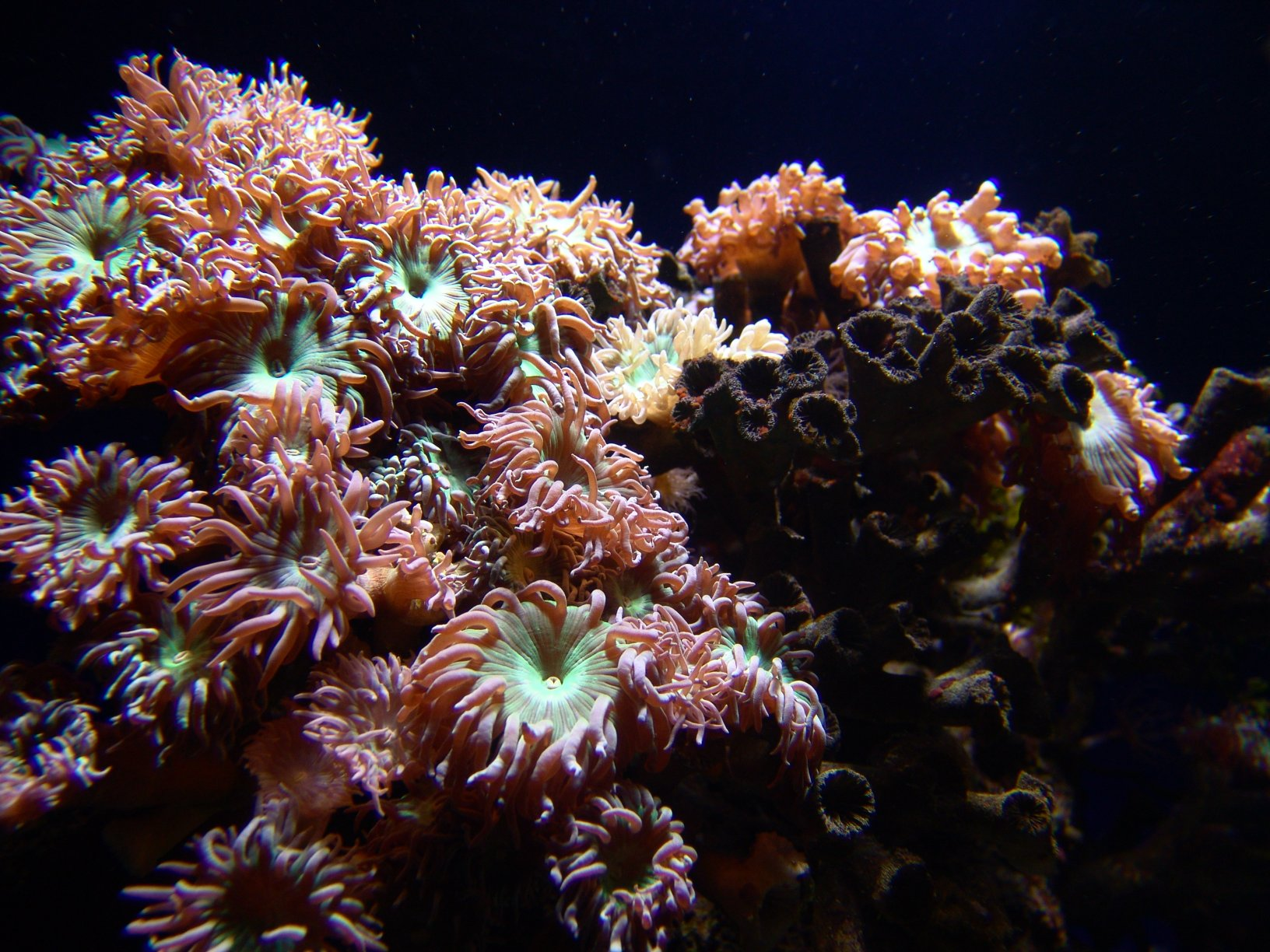
D. axifuga colony in a marine aquarium.

D. axifuga is a species of coral often encountered in the aquarium trade where it is commonly called the duncan coral and referred to as a type of large-polyp stony coral (LPS). It has become increasingly popular due to the relatively easy care requirements for the growth of the coral and the fast rate at which it grows. The duncan coral generally prefers to inhabit an established reef aquarium if brought into captivity. They live in saltwater, so an artificial saltwater mix should be provided for them to live in, and they require a temperature preferably between 75 and 80 °F (24 and 27 °C). These corals, like many other LPS corals, need low to moderate lighting to photosynthesize. Duncan corals also require a low to moderate current to bring them food such as phytoplankton or zooplankton naturally. However, target feeding can be supplemented by using a tool to dispense food onto the polyp's tentacles. This coral should be placed low in the tank, preferably on the substrate or on a low-lying rock, where the coral can form a colony. Propagating this coral is achieved by separating polyps from the base of the coral.
