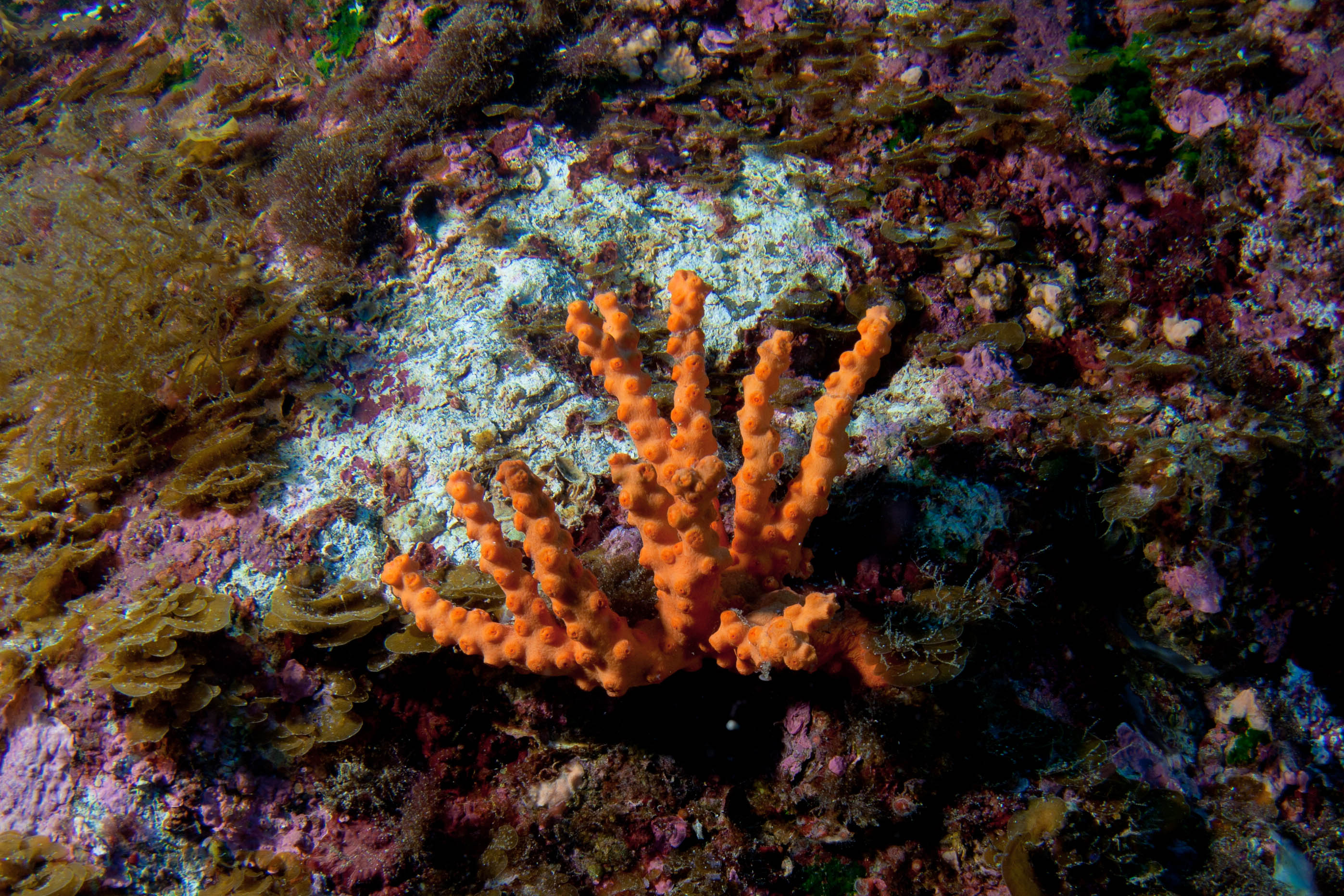
- Dendrophyllia cribrosa

Scientific classification
- Kingdom: Animalia
- Phylum: Cnidaria
- Subphylum: Anthozoa
- Class: Hexacorallia
- Order: Scleractinia
- Family: Dendrophylliidae
- Genus: Dendrophyllia; Blainville, 1830

Species
- See text

Synonyms
- Brasseyia Wright, 1882

= Dendrophyllia =

Genus of corals

Dendrophyllia is a genus of stony cup corals in the family Dendrophylliidae. Members of this genus are found at depths down to about 900 metres (3,000 ft). They are azooxanthellate corals, meaning that they do not contain symbiotic photosynthetic dinoflagellates as do many species of coral.

== Species ==
The following species are listed in the World Register of Marine Species (WoRMS):

- Dendrophyllia aculeata Latypov, 1990
- Dendrophyllia alcocki (Wells, 1954)
- Dendrophyllia alternata Pourtalès, 1880
- Dendrophyllia arbuscula van der Horst, 1922
- Dendrophyllia boschmai van der Horst, 1926
- Dendrophyllia californica Durham, 1947
- Dendrophyllia carleenae Nemenzo, 1983
- Dendrophyllia cecilliana Milne Edwards & Haime, 1848
- Dendrophyllia cladonia van der Horst, 1927
- Dendrophyllia compressa Eguchi & Sazaki, 1973
- Dendrophyllia cornigera (Lamarck, 1816)
- Dendrophyllia cribrosa Milne Edwards & Haime, 1851
- Dendrophyllia dilatata van der Horst, 1927
- Dendrophyllia florulenta Alcock, 1902
- Dendrophyllia futojiku Ogawa & Takahashi, 2000
- Dendrophyllia granosa Studer, 1878
- Dendrophyllia ijimai Yabe & Eguchi, 1934
- Dendrophyllia incisa (Crossland, 1952)
- Dendrophyllia indica Pillai, 1969
- Dendrophyllia johnsoni Cairns, 1991
- Dendrophyllia laboreli Zibrowius & Brito, 1984
- Dendrophyllia minima Ogawa & Takahashi, 2000
- Dendrophyllia minuscula Bourne, 1905
- Dendrophyllia oldroydae Oldroyd, 1924
- Dendrophyllia paragracilis Ogawa & Takahashi, 2000
- Dendrophyllia radians (Wright, 1882)
- Dendrophyllia ramea (Linnaeus, 1758)
- Dendrophyllia robusta (Bourne, 1905)
- Dendrophyllia suprarbuscula Ogawa & Takahashi, 2000
- Dendrophyllia velata Crossland, 1952
