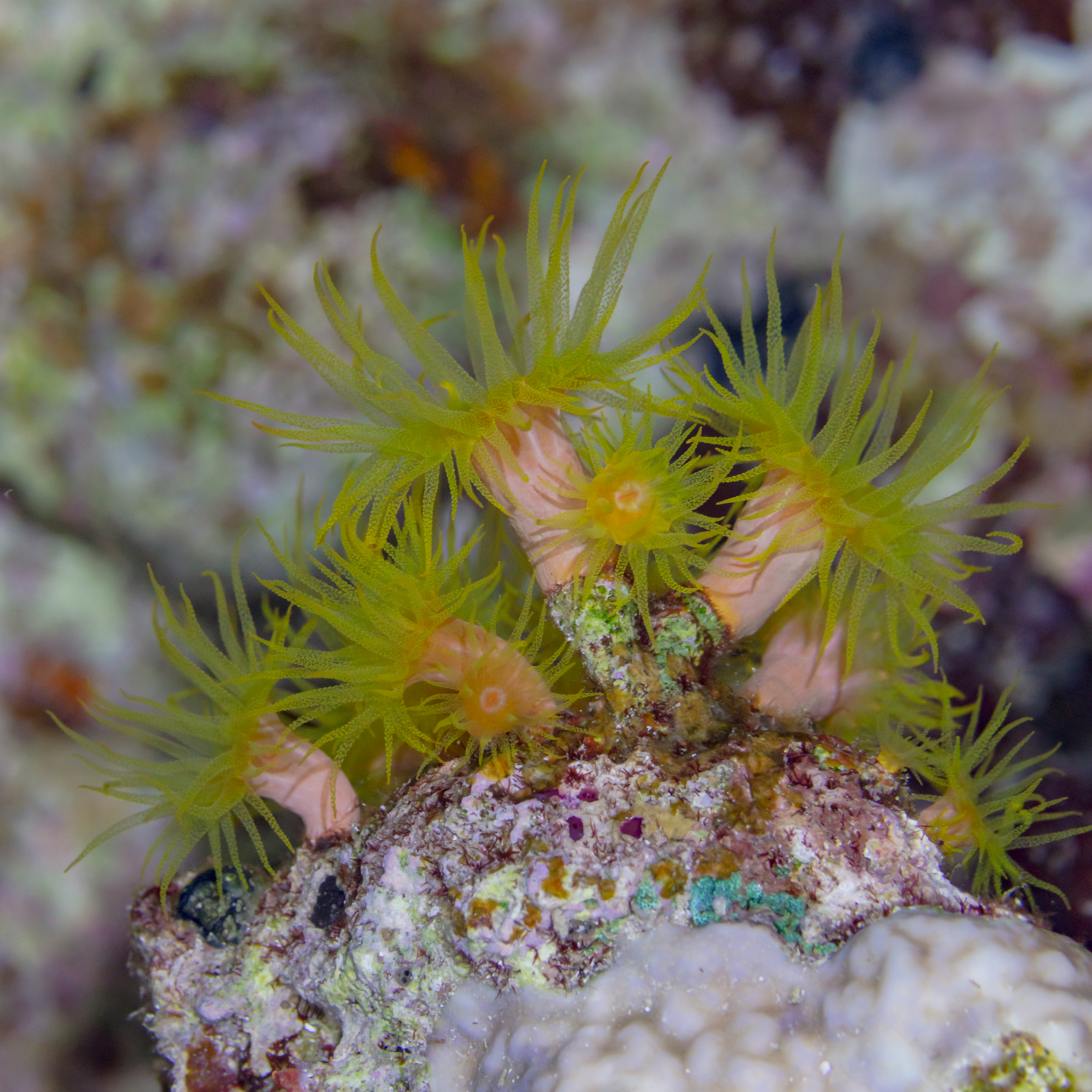
- Cladopsammia gracilis

Scientific classification
- Kingdom: Animalia
- Phylum: Cnidaria
- Subphylum: Anthozoa
- Class: Hexacorallia
- Order: Scleractinia
- Family: Dendrophylliidae
- Genus: Cladopsammia; Lacaze-Duthiers, 1897

Species
- See text

= Cladopsammia =

Genus of corals

Cladopsammia is a genus of stony cup corals in the family Dendrophylliidae. Members of this genus are found at depths down to about 470 metres (1,540 ft). They are azooxanthellate corals, meaning that they do not contain symbiotic photosynthetic dinoflagellates as do many species of coral.

== Species ==
The following species are listed in the World Register of Marine Species (WoRMS):

- Cladopsammia echinata Cairns, 1984
- Cladopsammia eguchii (Wells, 1982)
- Cladopsammia gracilis (Milne Edwards & Haime, 1848)
- Cladopsammia manuelensis (Chevalier, 1966)
- Cladopsammia rolandi Lacaze-Duthiers, 1897
- Cladopsammia willeyi (Gardiner, 1899)
