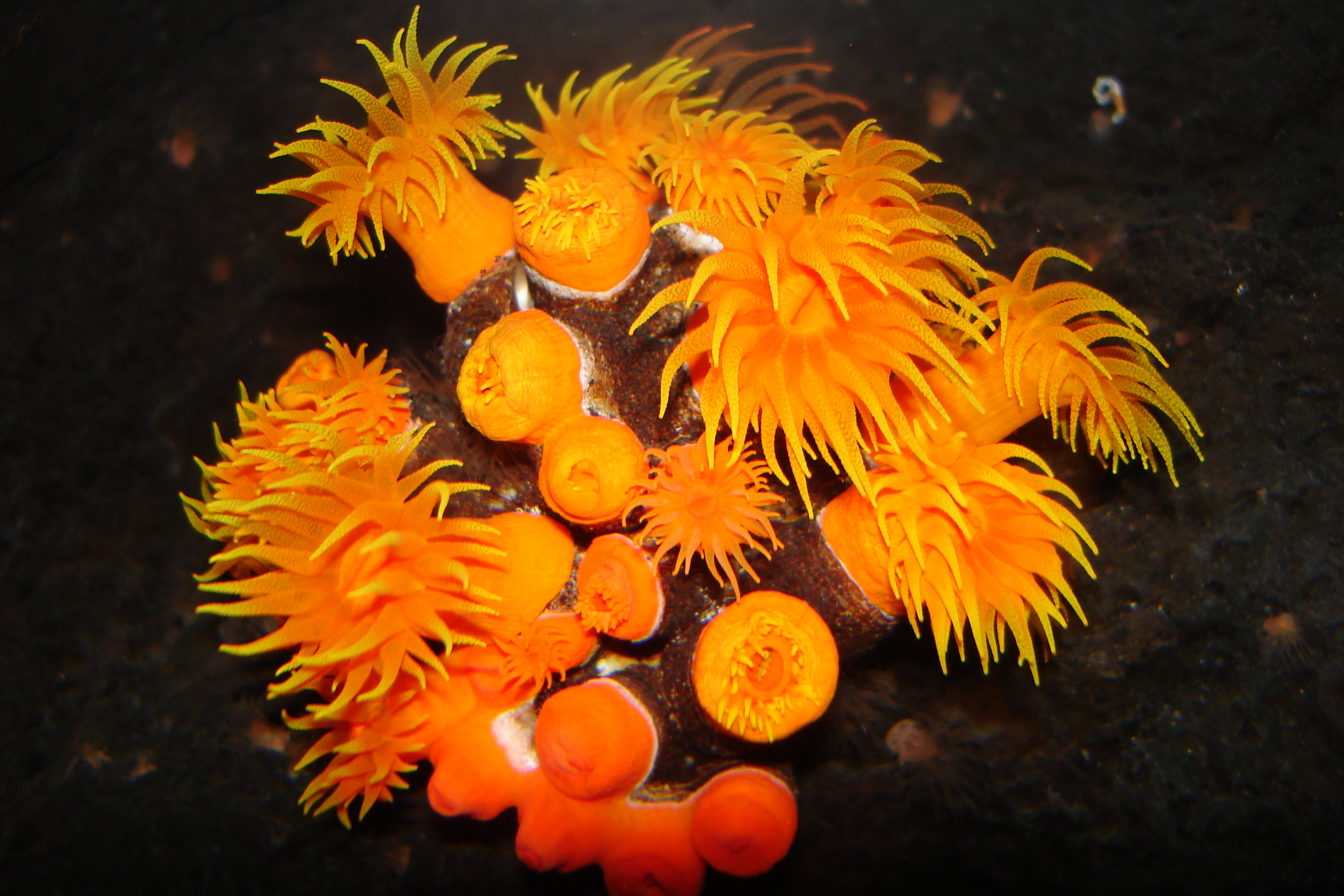
- Tubastraea coccinea

Scientific classification
- Kingdom: Animalia
- Phylum: Cnidaria
- Subphylum: Anthozoa
- Class: Hexacorallia
- Order: Scleractinia
- Family: Dendrophylliidae
- Genus: Tubastraea

Species
- Tubastraea caboverdiana; Tubastraea coccinea; Tubastraea diaphana; Tubastraea faulkneri; Tubastraea floreana; Tubastraea micranthus; Tubastraea tagusensis

Synonyms
- List: Astropsammia Verrill, 1869; Coenopsammia Milne Edwards & Haime, 1848; Pachypsammia Verrill, 1866; Placopsammia Duncan, 1876; Tubastaea [lapsus]; Tubastrea Lesson, 1829 [lapsus]

= Tubastraea =

Genus of corals

Tubastraea, also known as sun coral or sun polyps, is a genus of coral in the phylum Cnidaria. It is a cup coral in the family Dendrophylliidae.

== Description ==
Sun corals belong to a group of corals known as large-polyp stony corals. This means that while they produce a hard skeleton, they do not build reefs. Different species have polyps in a variety of colors, including yellow, orange, and shades of black.

== Feeding ==
Unlike most shallow water corals, Sun corals are not photosynthetic. Tubastraea do not host zooxanthellae, the symbiotic algae that provides energy to the coral via photosynthesis. Instead, they are heterotrophic, and extend long tentacles at night to catch passing zooplankton; their large polyp size allows them to take relatively large zooplankton.

== Habitat ==
Tubastraea coccinea was first documented in 1943 on Caribbean reefs in Curaçao and Puerto Rico. T. coccinea is an invasive species that was documented to have spread as far north as the Florida Keys National Marine Sanctuary in 2004.

Tubastraea is often found in deep waters because they do not require sunlight for nourishment. They often colonize on artificial surfaces - such as ship wrecks - for this reason.

== Reproduction and growth ==
Like most coral, sun coral reproduces asexually. They are hermaphrodites and produce planulae. These larvae live for up to two weeks, but usually colonize within 1 meter (3.3 ft) of the parent organism. They reproduce for approximately 1.5 years, growing about 3 cm^{2} per year.

In addition, Tubastraea form runners that can extend 10.4 centimeters (4.1 in) per year, until they reach unoccupied areas, then forming polyps at the end of the runner.

Reproduction occurs sexually during the summer, spring, and winter seasons. After fertilization, the female corals will carry the eggs as the offspring develop within her gastrovascular cavity and are released as larvae. After being released, the larvae disperse and eventually settle on rocky seafloors "cementing" their skeletal structure to a rock. Once cemented, the coral will grow and reside there for the rest of its life.

== Captivity ==
Tubastraea are considered one of the easier non photosynthetic corals to keep in captivity. Their polyps will take relatively large foods such as fish flakes and frozen mysis shrimp; feeding all the polyps once every other day is sufficient for survival, though faster growth is obtained if they are fed daily. Their polyps typically open only at night, but they can be coaxed to come out during the day with food. The largest challenge of keeping these - and any other non photosynthetic - corals is maintaining water quality with all the food they require.

== Species ==
Species:

- Tubastraea aurea (Quoy & Gaimard, 1833)
- Tubastraea coccinea Lesson, 1830
- Tubastraea diaphana (Dana, 1846)
- Tubastraea faulkneri Wells, 1982
- Tubastraea floreana Wells, 1982
- Tubastraea micranthus (Ehrenberg, 1834)
- Tubastraea nomlandi Durham, 1942
- Tubastraea tagusensis Wells, 1982
