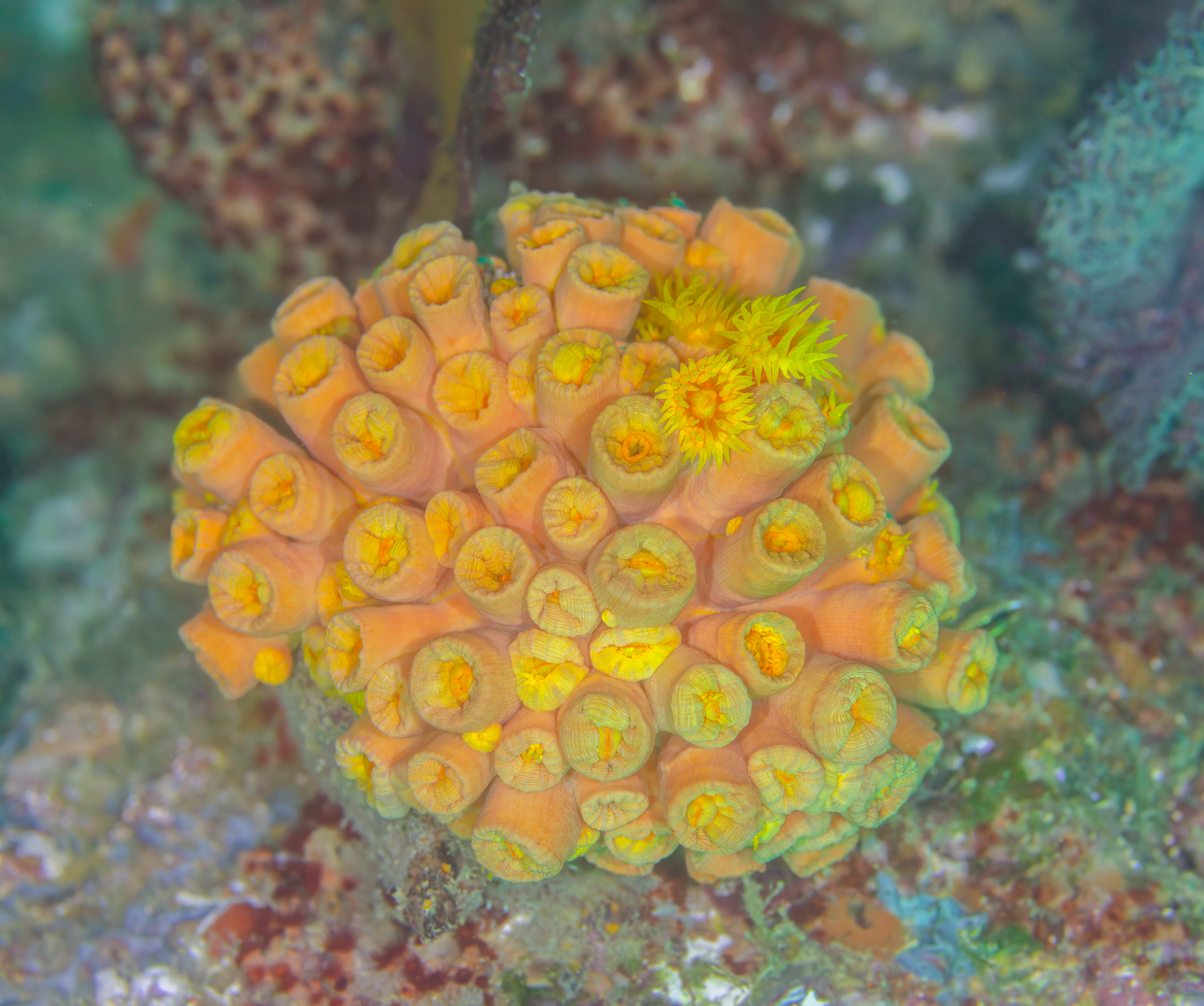
- T. coccinea with most tentacles withdrawn
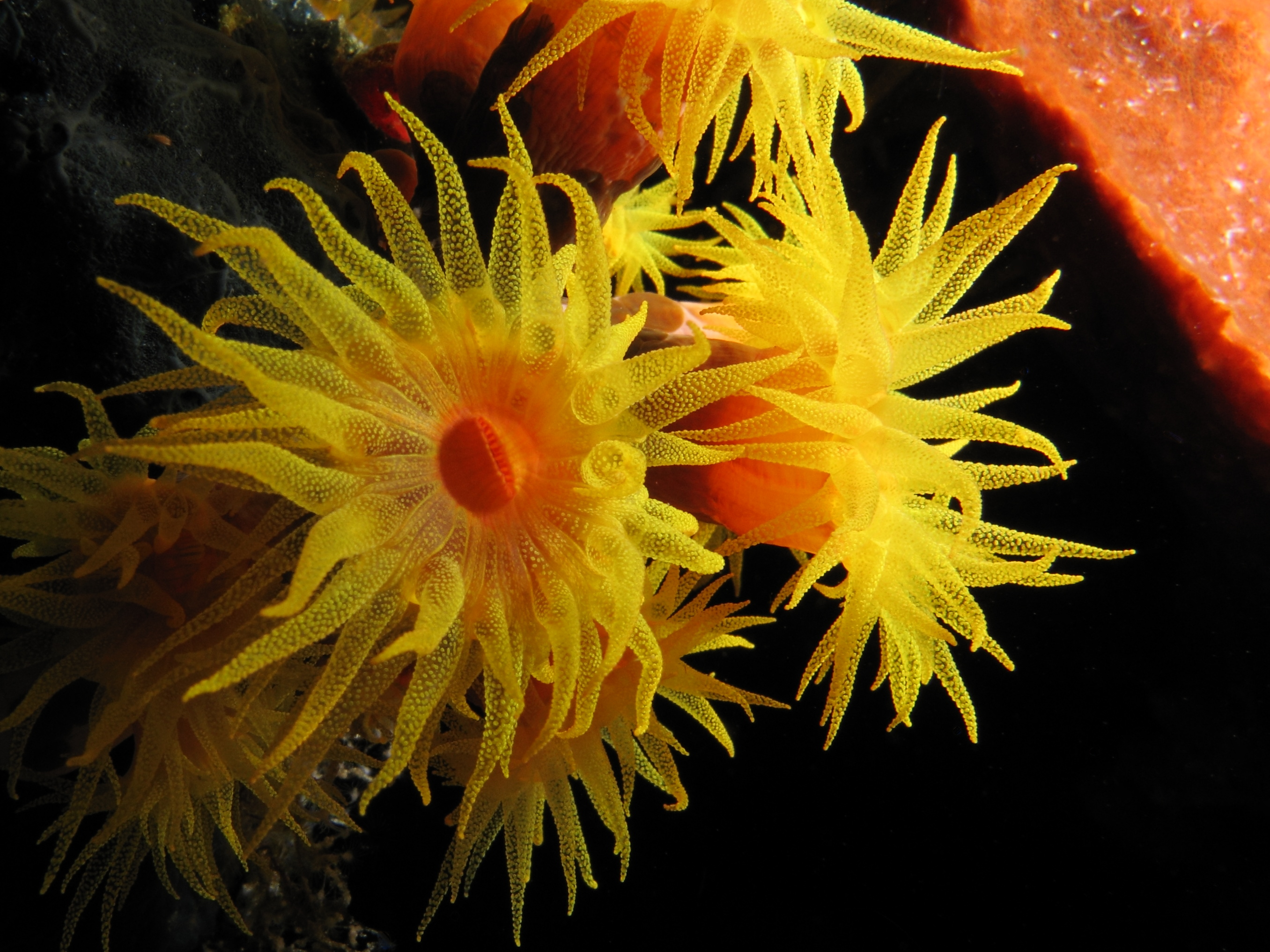
- Extended tentacles of T. coccinea

Scientific classification
- Kingdom: Animalia
- Phylum: Cnidaria
- Subphylum: Anthozoa
- Class: Hexacorallia
- Order: Scleractinia
- Family: Dendrophylliidae
- Genus: Tubastraea
- Species: T. coccinea

Binomial name
- Tubastraea coccinea Lesson, 1829

Synonyms
- List: Astropsammia pedersenii Verrill, 1869; Coenopsammia ehrenbergiana Milne Edwards & Haime, 1848; Coenopsammia gaimardi Milne Edwards & Haime, 1848; Coenopsammia manni Verrill, 1866; Coenopsammia radiata Verrill, 1864; Coenopsammia tenuilamellosa Milne Edwards & Haime, 1848; Coenopsammia urvillei Milne Edwards & Haime, 1848; Dendrophyllia affinis Duncan, 1889; Dendrophyllia aurantiaca Quoy & Gaimard, 1833; Dendrophyllia manni (Verrill, 1866); Dendrophyllia surcularis Verrill, 1869; Dendrophyllia turbinata Nemenzo, 1960; Lobopsammia aurea Quoy & Gaimard, 1833; Pachypsammia valida Verrill, 1866; Placopsammia darwini Duncan, 1876; Tubastaea coccinea Lesson, 1830 [lapsus]; Tubastraea aurea (Quoy & Gaimard, 1833); Tubastraea tenuilamellosa (Milne Edwards & Haime, 1848); Tubastrea aurea (Quoy & Gaimard, 1833)

= Orange cup coral =

Species of coral

Orange cup coral (Tubastraea coccinea) is a species of large-polyp stony corals. This non-reef building coral extends translucent tentacles at night. Tubastraea coccinea is heterotrophic and does not contain zooxanthellae in its tissues as many tropical corals do, allowing it to grow in complete darkness as long as it can capture enough food. T. coccinea is an invasive coral known for its vibrant sun-like colors, which contrast against the dimly lit areas it inhabits. This organism has a massive geographic range, spreading as far as the Atlantic, Caribbean, and Gulf of Mexico since its original discovery in 1830. Ballast water is a significant benefactor to their spread, though T. coccinea has also been known to cling to the underside of passing ships. Further, its ability to use sexual and asexual reproduction and lack of reliance on photosynthesis promote its invasive spread. Attempts have been made to control its spread.

== Taxonomy and classification ==
Tubastraea coccinea, also known as the orange cup coral or the sun coral, is a eukaryotic cnidarian belonging to the class Anthozoa and subclass Hexacorallia. T. coccinea was first named in 1830 by French naturalist René Primevère Lesson and is derived from Latin, serving as an initial description of the organism's immediate characteristics. The word Tubastraea is a mix of the word Tuba which is Latin for "tube" and Astrea from the Latinized form of the Greek Astraea, signifying star-like shapes. The epithet coccinea means scarlet, emphasizing the organism's vivid colors.

== Morphology and description ==
An azooxanthellate coral, T. coccinea is composed of colonies made up of calcareous cups clumps adjoined to a spongy calcareous base. A calcareous wall referred to as the corallite encircles each single polyp and is capable of reaching over 11 mm in diameter. White with faint ribs, the coralite skeleton is somewhat separated by 48 septa which peer into the organism's body cavity and are arranged in a cycle like structure around the coralite center. Interestingly, at the center of the coralitel exists at a significant columella skeletal projection. As per its name, T. coccinea's polyps are red, composed of yellow-orange tentacles.

It is likely that the environment plays a significant role in the appearance of T. coccinea's colony structure as these vary tremendously. For example, these corallites may be attached directly to each other via fused walls (ceroid), have distinct walls marked by coenosteum which separate them (plocoid), or simply be separated by masses of space (phaceloid). In aggressive shallow waters frequented by waves, colonies appear ceroid or plocoid while in deeper calmer waters they are marked by a much looser arrangement.

== Reproduction and life cycle ==
Orange Cup Coral, Tubastraea coccinea, can reproduce both sexually and asexually. The ability to reproduce in multiple ways may assist this species in invading and adapting to new environments. This coral has both male and female gonads within a single polyp. During reproduction, the coral releases sperm into the water column. Within this water column is where the eggs are kept within the gastrovascular cavity of the polyp. As a result, fertilization occurs internally, resulting in planula larvae. The free-swimming planktonic larvae survive for as many as 14 days. Because of this, they are able to travel far distances and get dispersed before becoming settled on a suitable substrate, where they then continue to develop, giving rise to new polyps. Orange-cup corals, however, can also reproduce asexually as well through what is referred to as budding. This is the process in which new polyps arise from the mature orange-cup coral's oral or basal disc. It can facilitate the fast growth of the colony and successful colonization of areas. The life cycle begins with the expulsion of sperm and internal fertilization of eggs to form planula larvae. They then attach to substrates and grow into calcareous-skeleton-bearing polyps following the planktonic stage. The polyps reproduce sexually or asexually to form duplicate colonies through budding. It is this blend of asexual and sexual reproduction and long-distance larval dispersal potential that has allowed Tubastraea coccinea to spread beyond its indigenous Indo-Pacific range and colonize new areas such as the Gulf of Mexico.

== Habitat ==
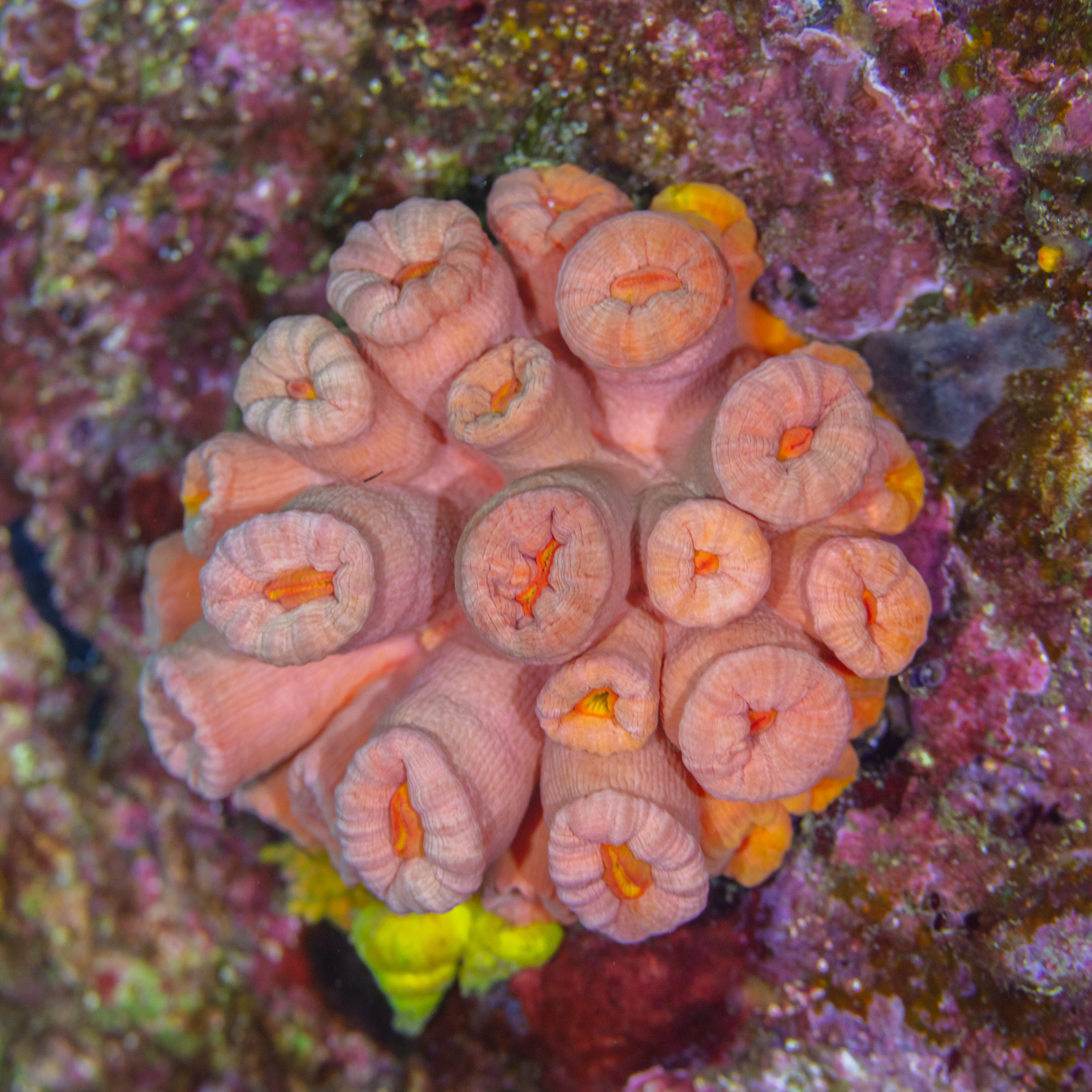
Exemplar in Baja California, Mexico

Orange cup coral (Tubastraea coccinea), an ahermatypic coral, is found in various habitats, natural and man-made. Because it is an azooxanthellate coral with no symbiotic algae, it can exist in low-light conditions. Tubastraea coccinea inhabits shaded vertical surfaces and caverns down to huge depths. T. coccinea are also found in very cold water throughout the world. In its native habitat in the Indo-Pacific, T. coccinea inhabits shaded vertical rock faces, caves, and under overhangs in shallow water. Its growth potential under complete darkness lets it occupy more photosynthetically disadvantageous niches. Orange-cup corals often dominate tropical habitats not occupied by other coral species, such as wrecks and cryptic reef habitats. They also colonize artificial structures. T. coccinea has been gathered on oil and gas rigs, shipwrecks, and other man-made habitats along the Atlantic coast of Florida and the Gulf of Mexico. Experiments have demonstrated similar preferences for granite, cement, steel and tile. In Brazil, they are most abundant in the shallow sub-tidal zone at shallow depths between 0 and 3 m (9.8 ft). These structures facilitate their dispersal as attachment surfaces, inadvertently allowing for secondary colonization. In other regions beyond its natural home, T. coccinea is invasive in regions such as the Gulf of Mexico, the Atlantic coast of Florida, the Caribbean, and Brazil. Their establishment on artificial substrates such as wrecks and oil rigs has been well documented, recording their facility and the potential to disrupt native ecosystems. The diversity of T. coccinea to multiple substrates and environments, combined with its reproductive tactics, highlights its colonizing success on a wide range of habitats and its potential influence on marine biodiversity.

== Behavior ==
Tubastraea coccinea utilizes several behaviors to become ecologically dominant and invasive. Its feeding behavior is one of them. T. coccinea lacks symbiotic algae and feeds heterotrophically. At night, it uses its transparent-colored tentacles to capture zooplankton of the surrounding environment to feed on. The ability to feed at night allows it to survive in low-light habitats where other corals cannot. T. coccinea is also aggressive when fighting for space with other sea creatures. They create many colonies that settle close to one another to occupy areas completely. They can also occupy vacant habitats, such as wrecks and reef habitats, that other organisms cannot.

== Invasive introduction and range ==
Although Tubastraea coccinea is listed in the Convention on International Trade in Endangered Species (CITES) website and database, it often competes with other benthic invertebrates for substratum space. This may put native species at risk, particularly sponges and native corals. Local exclusion or extinction of such species may occur, and the removal of the native corals may reduce the production of the entire ecosystem, compromising ecosystem functions. Tubastraea coccinea is native to the Indo-Pacific region, it has been recorded at Sonadia Island, Cox's Bazar, Bangladesh in 2013, by Marinelife Alliance, research organization. However, it has been introduced to the Atlantic, Brazilian Exclusive Economic Zone, the Caribbean Sea, the Gulf of Mexico, New Zealand Exclusive Economic Zone, and the West African region and Mediterranean Sea (Malta) as well.

There are various biological and ecological characteristics that aid T. coccinea's ability to invade new areas. In most cases, T. coccinea can quickly colonize new habitats by using their ability to reproduce both sexually and asexually. This species can also grow and regenerate rapidly. This allows the T. coccinea to heal from any physical harm that may come to it quickly and efficiently. This coral also utilizes the ocean's currents to spread. They are able to use the currents because of T. coccinea's high fecundity and ability to produce planula larvae. These larvae are able to survive for days or even weeks before settling on a new surface. This allows the coral's offspring to spread and cover larger areas. T. coccinea's ability to colonize a wide range of depths and habitats, including low light and murky waters, also allows this coral to inhabit and take control of areas that may not have established native organisms. T. coccinea's growth and invasions will severely disrupt local ecosystems and native organisms. The reason it is so disruptive is because it regularly outcompetes and outgrows the native species. T. coccinea's domination of the native environment will change the composition of reef communities and frequently result in decreased biodiversity. Its dominance reduces the structural complexity of reefs, homogenizes habitats, and forms monocultures on hard substrates.

== Human impact and conservation ==
Semi-submersible platforms serve as a major contributor to the spread of T. coccinea. Rather, T. coccinea have been known to affix themselves to long distance ships and release themselves upon reaching an optimal temperature range. As human trade routes continue to expand, T. coccinea invasions are likely to expand which presses the need for better control methods. While few natural attempts to rid T. coccinea have been successful, synthesized compounds may offer an alternative approach. Recently, the naturally synthetic compound, 1-hydroxy-2-O-acyl-sn-glycero-3-phosphocholine has shown some promise. According to a 2022 study, this synthesized compound was able to eliminate roughly 35% to 3% of invasive cup coral larvae with the average lethal concentration being 142.2 μg/mL. Other chemical control methods have been proposed. For example, sodium hypochlorite (2.5% active chlorine) has been tested against T. coccinea at various concentrations. At 150 ppm and 200 ppm, a nearly 100% mortality rate was observed in colonies in 5 hours and 3 hours respectively. Similarly, immersion of colonies in half or full concentrations of acetic acid has been shown to be effective at killing T. coccinea. Given its vibrant colors, T. coccinea is often found as part of aquariums and for commercial purchase, both promoting another potential vector for invasions.
