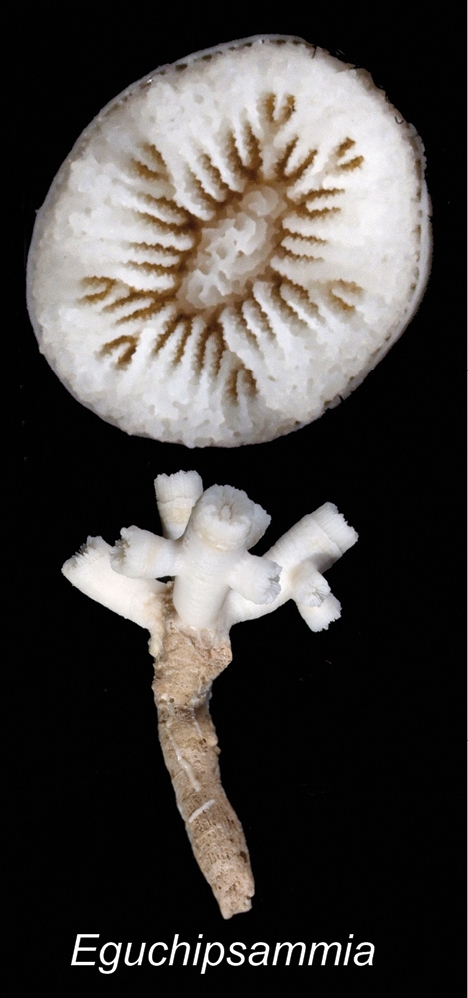
- Eguchipsammia fistula

Scientific classification
- Domain: Eukaryota
- Kingdom: Animalia
- Phylum: Cnidaria
- Class: Hexacorallia
- Order: Scleractinia
- Family: Dendrophylliidae
- Genus: Eguchipsammia; Cairns, 1994

= Eguchipsammia =

Genus of corals

Eguchipsammia is a genus of corals belonging to the family Dendrophylliidae.

The genus has almost cosmopolitan distribution.

Species:

- Eguchipsammia cornucopia (Pourtalès, 1871)
- Eguchipsammia fistula (Alcock, 1902)
- Eguchipsammia gaditana (Duncan, 1873)
- Eguchipsammia japonica (Rehberg, 1892)
- Eguchipsammia serpentina (Vaughan, 1907)
- Eguchipsammia strigosa Cairns, 2000
- Eguchipsammia wellsi (Eguchi, 1968)
