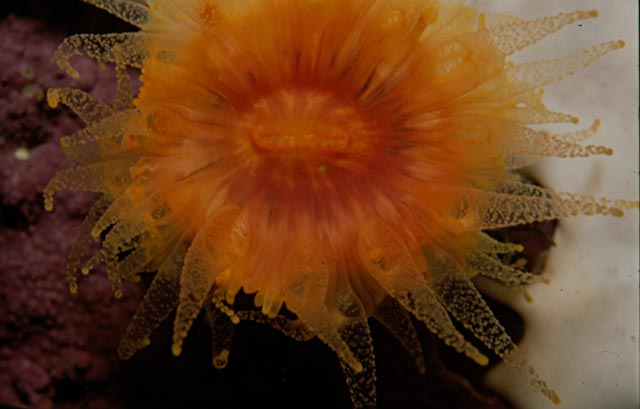
- Balanophyllia bonaespei

Scientific classification
- Domain: Eukaryota
- Kingdom: Animalia
- Phylum: Cnidaria
- Subphylum: Anthozoa
- Class: Hexacorallia
- Order: Scleractinia
- Family: Dendrophylliidae
- Genus: Balanophyllia; Wood, 1844

Subgenera
- See text

= Balanophyllia =

Genus of corals

Balanophyllia is a genus of solitary corals in the order of stony corals.

== Subgenera ==
The genus includes two subgenera with species as follows:

- Balanophyllia (Balanophyllia) Wood, 1844
  - Balanophyllia bairdiana Milne Edwards & Haime, 1848
  - Balanophyllia bayeri Cairns, 1979
  - Balanophyllia bonaespei van der Horst, 1938
  - Balanophyllia capensis Verrill, 1865
  - Balanophyllia cedrosensis Durham, 1947
  - Balanophyllia cellulosa Duncan, 1873
  - Balanophyllia chnous Squires, 1962
  - Balanophyllia corniculans (Alcock, 1902)
  - Balanophyllia cornu Moseley, 1881
  - Balanophyllia crassiseptum Cairns & Zibrowius, 1997
  - Balanophyllia crassitheca Cairns, 1995
  - Balanophyllia cumingii Milne Edwards & Haime, 1848
  - Balanophyllia cyathoides (Pourtalès, 1871)
  - Balanophyllia dentata Tenison Woods, 1879
  - Balanophyllia desmophyllioides Vaughan, 1907
  - Balanophyllia diademata van der Horst, 1927
  - Balanophyllia diffusa Harrison & Poole, 1909
  - Balanophyllia dilatata Dennant, 1904
  - Balanophyllia dineta Cairns, 1977
  - Balanophyllia diomedeae Vaughan, 1907
  - Balanophyllia dubia (Semper, 1872)
  - Balanophyllia elegans Verrill, 1864
  - Balanophyllia europaea (Risso, 1826)
  - Balanophyllia floridana Pourtalès, 1868
  - Balanophyllia galapagensis Vaughan, 1907
  - Balanophyllia gemma (Moseley, 1881)
  - Balanophyllia gemmifera Klunzinger, 1879
  - Balanophyllia generatrix Cairns & Zibrowius, 1997
  - Balanophyllia gigas Moseley, 1881
  - Balanophyllia hadros Cairns, 1979
  - Balanophyllia helenae Duncan, 1876
  - Balanophyllia iwayamaensis Abe, 1938
  - Balanophyllia japonica Cairns, 2001
  - Balanophyllia javaensis† Cairns, 2001
  - Balanophyllia kalakauai Wright, 1882
  - Balanophyllia laysanensis Vaughan, 1907
  - Balanophyllia malouinensis Squires, 1961
  - Balanophyllia merguiensis Duncan, 1889
  - Balanophyllia palifera Pourtalès, 1878
  - Balanophyllia parallela (Semper, 1872)
  - Balanophyllia parvula Moseley, 1881
  - Balanophyllia pittieri† Vaughan, 1919
  - Balanophyllia profundicella Gardiner, 1899
  - Balanophyllia rediviva Moseley, 1881
  - Balanophyllia regia Gosse, 1853
  - Balanophyllia scabra Alcock, 1893
  - Balanophyllia scabrosa (Dana, 1846)
  - Balanophyllia serrata Cairns & Zibrowius, 1997
  - Balanophyllia spongiosa Cairns, 2004
  - Balanophyllia striata Duncan, 1876
  - Balanophyllia taprobanae Bourne, 1905
  - Balanophyllia tenuis van der Horst, 1922
  - Balanophyllia thalassae Zibrowius, 1980
  - Balanophyllia ukrainensis† Cairns, 2001
  - Balanophyllia vanderhorsti Cairns, 2001
  - Balanophyllia wellsi Cairns, 1977
  - Balanophyllia yongei Crossland, 1952
- Balanophyllia (Eupsammia) Milne Edwards & Haime, 1848
  - Balanophyllia caribbeana Cairns, 1977
  - Balanophyllia carinata (Semper, 1872)
  - Balanophyllia imperialis Kent, 1871
  - Balanophyllia pittieri Vaughan, 1919
  - Balanophyllia regalis (Alcock, 1893)
  - Balanophyllia stimpsonii (Verrill, 1865)
