= Ampère Seamount =

Seamount in the Atlantic Ocean

Coordinates: 35°04′N 12°57′W

Ampère Seamount

Ampère Seamount is a seamount in the Atlantic Ocean, 410 km (250 mi) south-west of Portugal and 470 km (290 mi) west of Morocco.

It is located at 35°04' N and 12°57' W. This seamount is about 90 km × 40 km, its base is at a depth of approximately 4,500 m (14,800 ft). The summit topography is rather disturbed with a summit plateau that is 6 by 3 km (3.7 by 1.9 mi) at a depth of 120 m (390 ft) and a peak reaching up to 55 m (180 ft) below the water surface.

In March 1974, Soviet research ship Academician Petrovsky underwent an expedition to explore the Ampere and Josephine seamounts. Underwater photographs taken during this expedition revealed a stone wall which included cut stone blocks scattered on both sides, Also what appear to be artificial steps partially covered with lava were photographed on the flat summit of the Ampere Seamount. This was the grounds for speculation that it may have been the location of the legendary Atlantis.
