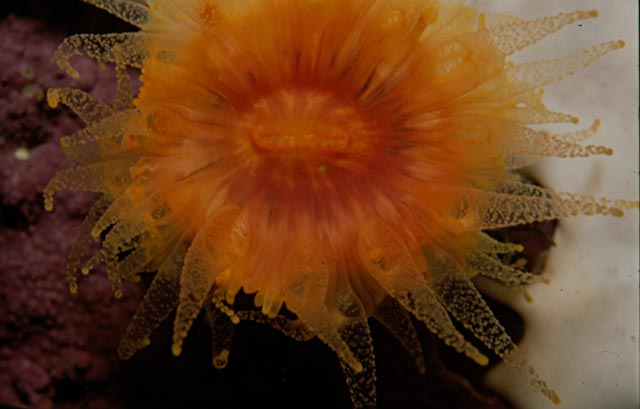
- Balanophyllia bonaespei

Scientific classification
- Kingdom: Animalia
- Phylum: Cnidaria
- Subphylum: Anthozoa
- Class: Hexacorallia
- Order: Scleractinia
- Suborder: Dendrophylliina
- Family: Dendrophylliidae; Gray, 1847

Genera
- See text

= Dendrophylliidae =

Family of corals

Dendrophylliidae is a family of stony corals. Most (but not all) members are azooxanthellate and thus have to capture food with their tentacles instead of relying on photosynthesis to produce their food. The World Register of Marine Species includes these genera in the family:

- Astroides Quoy & Gaimard, 1827
- Balanophyllia Wood, 1844
- Balanopsammia Ocana & Brito, 2013
- Bathypsammia Marenzeller, 1907
- Cladopsammia Lacaze-Duthiers, 1897
- Dendrophyllia de Blainville, 1830
- Dichopsammia Song, 1994
- Duncanopsammia Wells, 1936
- Eguchipsammia Cairns, 1994
- Enallopsammia Sismonda, 1871
- Endopachys Milne Edwards & Haime, 1848
- Endopsammia Milne Edwards & Haime, 1848
- Heteropsammia Milne-Edwards & Haime, 1848
- Leptopsammia Milne-Edwards & Haime, 1848
- Lobopsammia† Milne Edwards & Haime, 1848
- Notophyllia Dennant, 1899
- Pourtalopsammia Cairns, 2001
- Rhizopsammia Verrill, 1869
- Thecopsammia Pourtalès, 1868
- Trochopsammia Pourtalès, 1878
- Tubastraea Lesson, 1829
- Turbinaria Oken, 1815
