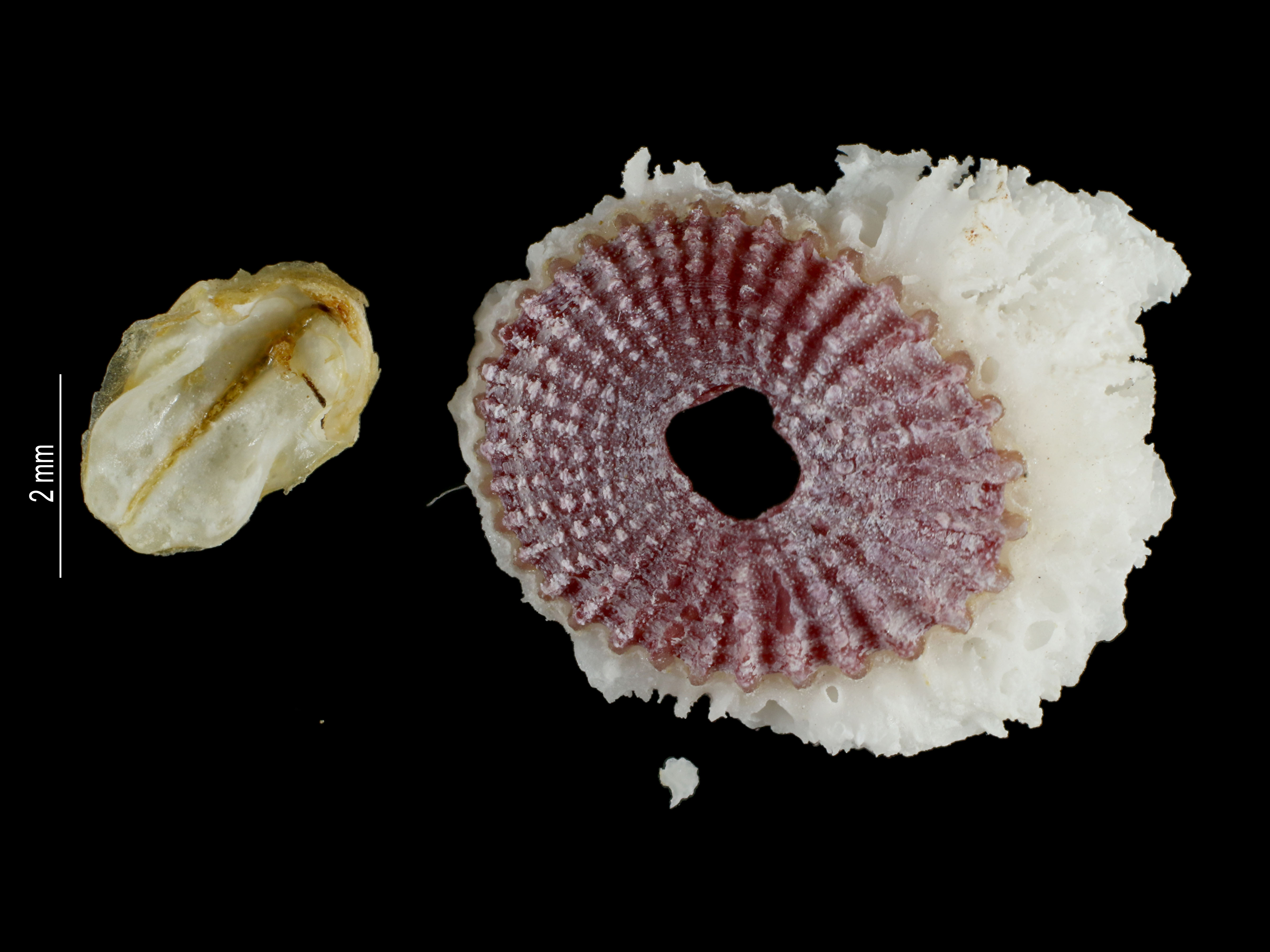
- Trevathana synthesysae, Indian Ocean

Scientific classification
- Kingdom: Animalia
- Phylum: Arthropoda
- Class: Thecostraca
- Subclass: Cirripedia
- Order: Balanomorpha
- Family: Pyrgomatidae
- Subfamily: Pyrgomatinae
- Genus: Trevathana
- Species: T. synthesysae

Binomial name
- Trevathana synthesysae Achituv & Langsam, 2009

= Trevathana synthesysae =

Species of crustaceans

Trevathana synthesysae is a species of coral barnacle in the family Pyrgomatidae.
