= XKR7 =

Identifiers
- Aliases: XKR7, C20orf159, dJ310O13.4, XK related 7
- External IDs: MGI: 3526711; GeneCards: XKR7

Gene location (Human)
Chr.	Chromosome 20 (human)
Band	20q11.21	Start	31,968,151 bp
Band	20q11.21	End	32,003,387 bp

Gene location (Mouse)
Chr.	Chromosome 2 (mouse)
Band	2|2 H1	Start	152,873,772 bp
Band	2|2 H1	End	152,897,695 bp
RNA expression pattern
Bgee	Human / Mouse (ortholog); Top expressed in: ganglionic eminence; testicle; cerebellar hemisphere; right hemisphere of cerebellum; pancreatic ductal cell; islet of Langerhans; pituitary gland; prefrontal cortex; anterior pituitary; ventricular zone / Top expressed in: ganglionic eminence; cerebellum; cerebellar cortex; embryo; neural layer of retina; ventricular zone; superior frontal gyrus; epiblast; primary visual cortex; mesencephalon; More reference expression data
BioGPS	n/a
Orthologs
Databases	NCBI: entry; OMA: entry
Species	Human	Mouse
Entrez	343702	228787
Ensembl	ENSG00000260903	ENSMUSG00000042631
UniProt	Q5GH72	Q5GH64
RefSeq (mRNA)	NM_001011718	NM_001011732
RefSeq (protein)	NP_001011718	NP_001011732
Location (UCSC)	Chr 20: 31.97 – 32 Mb	Chr 2: 152.87 – 152.9 Mb
PubMed search
- Wikidata
View/Edit Human	View/Edit Mouse

XK-related protein 7 (XKR7) is a protein that in humans is encoded by the XKR7 gene (previously C20orf159). In humans, it is predicted to be a transmembrane protein. It is predicted to be involved in apoptotic process during development.

== Gene ==
The XKR7 gene is located on plus end strand of chromosome 20 at locus 20q.11.21 and spans from 31968151 to 32003387. It is 1740 base pairs long and contains 3 exons with no known isoforms.

=== Gene neighbors ===
Several other genes are near the XKR7 gene along chromosome 20. Some of the closest ones are PDRG1, TTLL9, and CCM2L.

Gene	Description
PDRG1	A protein-coding gene near XKR7 in the regulatory-element context of its promoter/enhancer region.
TTLL9	Also appears in the same regulatory neighborhood as XKR7.
CCM2L	Another gene near XKR7 whose protein interacts with XKR7

=== Gene level regulation ===
XKR7 is expressed in the brain and pancreas, but lowly at around fifteen percent. The multiple sequence alignment of XKR7 and it's orthologs showed high conservation of the 5' untranslated region where transcription factor ZNF460 binds too.

== Protein ==
The XKR7 protein contains 579 amino acids with a molecular weight of 63 kDa, and consists of 3 disordered regions, alongside 6 transmembrane regions. XKR7 was found to have high amounts of these amino acids: Leu,Val, Ile, Phe, and Met; all of which contribute to transmembrane helices. There are no major charge clusters, showing no strong cytoplasmic regulatory domains. However, the isoelectric point is 9.2, so at lower pHs, XKR7 will be positively charged.

=== Structure ===
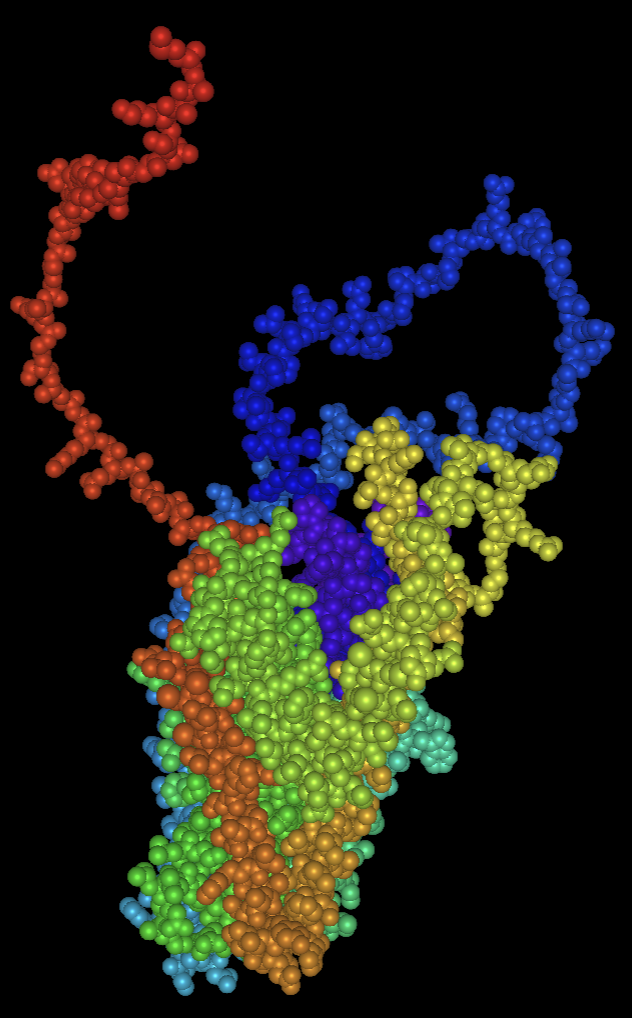
Tertiary Structure of XKR7, colored with a rainbow gradient. Red signifies the N-term, and purple is the C-term.

The tertiary structure of XKR7 mostly consists of alpha helices. The most confident parts of the structure is the transmembrane region, which is highly hydrophobic and uncharged. The disordered regions are shown by red and blue, which consists of cations and anions, and is hydrophilic.

=== Protein level regulation ===
There are around 7 phosphorylation sites between 2nd and 3rd transmembrane protein. Analysis on the mouse ortholog produces the exact same image with these phosphorylation sites conserved: S154, G167, T183, Y201, S206, S240, and S249. Y201 is the most functionally important site. When Y201 is phosphorylated, it’s a binding site for SH2-domain proteins (docking site), and when it’s unphosphorylated it functions as a tyrosine-based sorting signal for adaptor proteins.

=== Protein - protein interactions ===
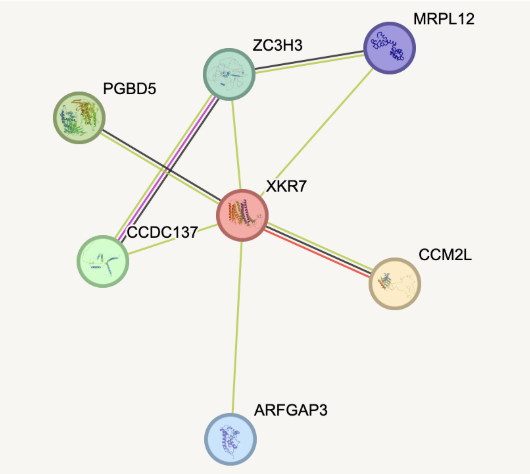
XKR7 Protein Interactions

CCM2L and PGBD5 have the highest interaction scores. Using co-IP or pull-down assays could test physical binding. Using fluorescence microscopy would verify whether the proteins are in the same cellular compartment.

Abbreviated name	Full Name	Score	Subcellular Compartment	Function
CCM2L	Cerebral cavernous malformations 2 protein-like	0.628	Membrane associated	Regulates signaling and cell-cell junctions
PGBD5	PiggyBac transposable element-derived protein 5	0.608	Nucleus	Influences genome regulation in neurons
CCDC137	Coiled-coil domain containing 137	0.529	Nucleus/Nucleolus	Nucleolar organization
ZC3H3	Zinc finger CCCH domain-containing protein 3	0.501	Nucleus	Regulates RNA processing

=== Single nucleotide polymorphisms ===
Most of the SNPs were found towards the C-term, transmembrane regions, or disordered regions.

Order in CT	SNP	Change	Base Change	Mutation Type	Significance
1	rs138804760	Met417Thr	T → C	missense	TMR 7
2	rs147437006	Arg292Glu Arg292Leu	G → A,T	missense	N/A
3	rs200124372	Arg483Glu Arg483Pro Arg483Leu	G → A,C,T	missense	In disordered region
4	rs367920055	Thr558Lys Thr558Met	C → A,T	missense	C-term
5	rs371260952	Asp374Lys	C → A,T	missense or silent	TMR 6
6	rs541196906	Arg565Glu Arg565Pro Arg565Leu	G → A,C,T	missense	C-term
7	rs546872871	Ala161Met Ala161Val Ala161Leu	C → A,G,T	missense	In disordered region
8	rs572256162	Val233Tyr	G → A	missense	C-term

== Homology ==
Paralogs of XKR7 Homo Sapiens
Paralog	Amino Acid Length	Percent Similarity	Percent Identity
HSA_XKR4	650	57%	46%
HSA_XKR6	641	56.3%	44.60%
HSA_XKR8	395	33.10%	22.30%
HSA_XKR9_2	373	30.70%	18.10%
HSA_XKR5_1	686	26.40%	18.10%
HSA_XKR5_2	523	16.20%	11.00%
HSA_XKR9_1	241	19.80%	12.80%

XKR7 in Homo Sapiens has many paralogs as it’s a part of a very large X-Kell related protein family. The XKR protein family primarily functions as lipid scramblases, a crucial protein to signal for apoptosis. There are a total of seven paralogs with the two most similar to XKR7 are XKR4 and XKR6 (Ref. Paralog table). Paralogs were found using Genecards and NCBI Protein database, while the sequence similarity and identity were done through Emboss Needle.

Orthologs of XKR7 Homo Sapiens
Genus and species	Common Name	Taxonomic Group	Median Date of Divergence (MYA)	Accession Number	Amino Acid Sequence Length	Sequence Identity to Human Protein	Sequence Similarity to Human Protein
Homo sapiens	Humans	Primates	0	NP_001011718.1	579	100%	100%
Sarcophilus harrisii	Tasmanian devil	Dasyuromorphia	160	XP_023363111	571	72%	78.10%
Gracilinanus agilis	Agile gracile opossum	Didelphimorphia	160	XP_044515717	625	76%	75.00%
Opisthocomus hoazin	Hoazin	Opisthocomiformes	319	XP_075294519	545	68%	75.40%
Excalfactoria chinensis	King quail	Galliformes	319	XP_072206629	527	68%	75%
Malaclemys terrapin	Diamondback terrapin	Testudines	319	XM_054046095.1	577	70%	79.60%
Podarcis raffonei	Aeolian wall lizard	Squamata	319	XP_053247703	574	72%	75.60%
Erythrolamprus reginae	Royal ground snake	Squamata	319	XP_070600370	590	66.70%	75.60%
Chelonoidis abingdonii	Pinta Island tortoise	Testudines	319	XP_074928543	581	67.30%	75.00%
Pleurodeles waltl	Iberian ribbed newt	Urodela	352	XP_069099477	531	66%	74.70%
Microcaecilia unicolor		Gymnophiona	352	XP_030069193.1	562	64%	72.40%
Phyllobates terribilis	Golden poison frog	Dendrobatidae	352	XP_073538933	494	62%	67.70%
Conger conger	European conger	Anguilliformes	429	XP_061114556	567	63%	73.40%
Polypterus senegalus	Gray bichir	Polypteriformes	429	XP_039590706	554	63%	72.10%
Erpetoichthys calabaricus	Reedfish	Polypteriformes	429	XP_028667497	554	63%	71.90%
Semicossyphus pulcher	California sheephead	Perciformes	429	XP_069515596	611	56%	68.30%
Callorhinchus milii	Australian ghostshark	Holocephali	462	XP_042197801	549	61%	68.30%
Chiloscyllium punctatum	Brownbanded bamboo shark	Orectolobiformes	462	XP_072412862	595	60%	71.60%
Hemitrygon akajei	Red stingray	Myliobatiformes	462	XP_072917960	574	59%	70.80%
Amblyraja radiata	Thorny skate	Rajiformes	462	XP_032897124	581	64%	70.30%
Petromyzon marinus	Sea lamprey	Petromyzontiformes	563	XP_075929753	752	53%	47.60%

Orthologs of XKR7 Homo sapiens are sorted by median date of divergence and then by sequence identity to XKR7 Homo sapiens. There were an overwhelming number of mammal, avian, and reptilian orthologs, but the number of orthologs decreased as the median date of divergence increased. Actinopterygii and Chondrichthyes both only had a handful of orthologs for XKR7 Homo sapiens, but it mostly consisted of orthologs for XKR7 Homo sapiens paralogs. Sequences, identity, and similarity were found using NCBI Protein and Emboss Needle.Cyclostomata, Jawless fish, are the most distantly related species to humans with the Sea Lamprey having a median date of divergent of 563 million years ago and 53% identity. Marsupials, Avians, Reptilia, with average sequence identity of 73.6% sequence identity.

== Clinical significance ==
It is suggested, using mouse shotgun data alongside humans, could hold the key to understanding diseases like Creutzfeldt-Jakob disease, a rare and fatal neurodegenerative disease from an accumulation of prions, and severe immunodeficiency. A study by Zhang et al. (2020) used RNA-seq for comparative expression in small cell lung cancer (SCLC) and adjacent normal tissue, which identified DRD2 and XKR7 upregulating SCLC. Such a significant difference suggests that XKR7 could be linked to greater tumor aggressiveness. Gnathodiaphyseal Dysplasia is also associated with XKR7, but it's not the main cause.
