= Strombolicchio Lighthouse =

Strombolicchio
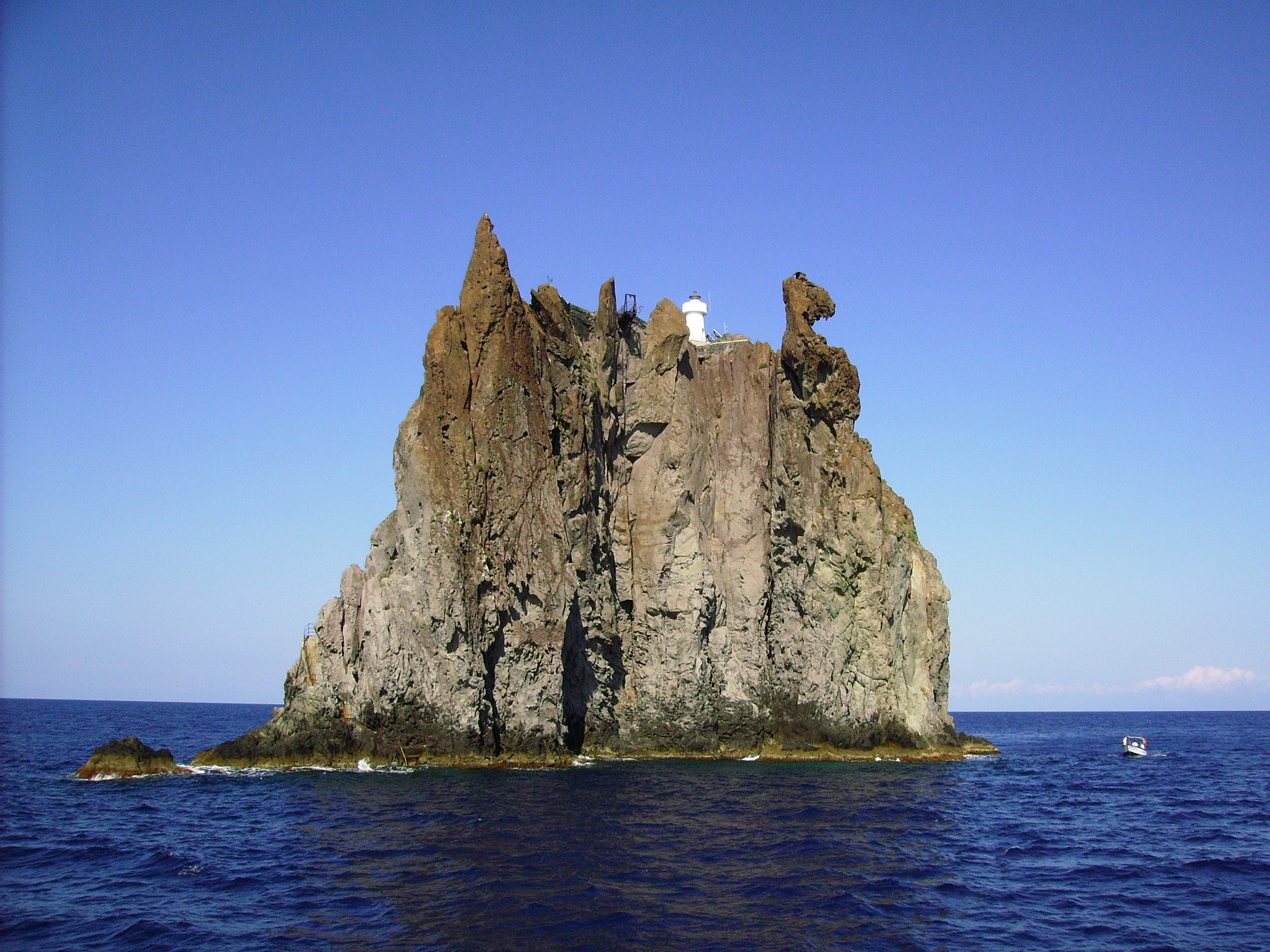
- Strombolicchio and the lighthouse
- Location: Strombolicchio; Aeolian Islands; Sicily
- Coordinates: 38°49′02″N 15°15′08″E

Tower
- Constructed: 1925
- Construction: stone tower
- Height: 8 metres (26 ft)
- Shape: cylindrical tower with balcony and lantern atop a service building
- Markings: white tower, grey metallic lantern dome
- Power source: solar power
- Operator: Marina Militare

Light
- Focal height: 57 metres (187 ft)
- Intensity: LABI 100 W
- Range: main: 11 nautical miles (20 km; 13 mi) reserve: 8 nautical miles (15 km; 9.2 mi)
- Characteristic: Fl (3) W 15s.
- Italy no.: 3310 E.F.

Strombolicchio Lighthouse (Italian: Faro di Strombolicchio) is an active lighthouse placed on the summit of Strombolicchio, a sea stack 1 nautical mile (1.9 km; 1.2 mi) to the north-east of Stromboli in the Aeolian Islands.

== Description ==
The lighthouse was built in 1925 and consists of a white cylindrical tower, 8 metres (26 ft) high, with balcony and lantern, atop a 1-storey white stone keeper's house. The lantern, painted in metallic grey, is 57 metres (187 ft) above sea level and emits three white flashes in a 15 seconds period, visible up to a distance of 11 nautical miles (20 km; 13 mi). It is completely automated, solar powered, and is operated by the Marina Militare; its identification code number is 3310 E.F.

== See also ==
- List of lighthouses in Italy
