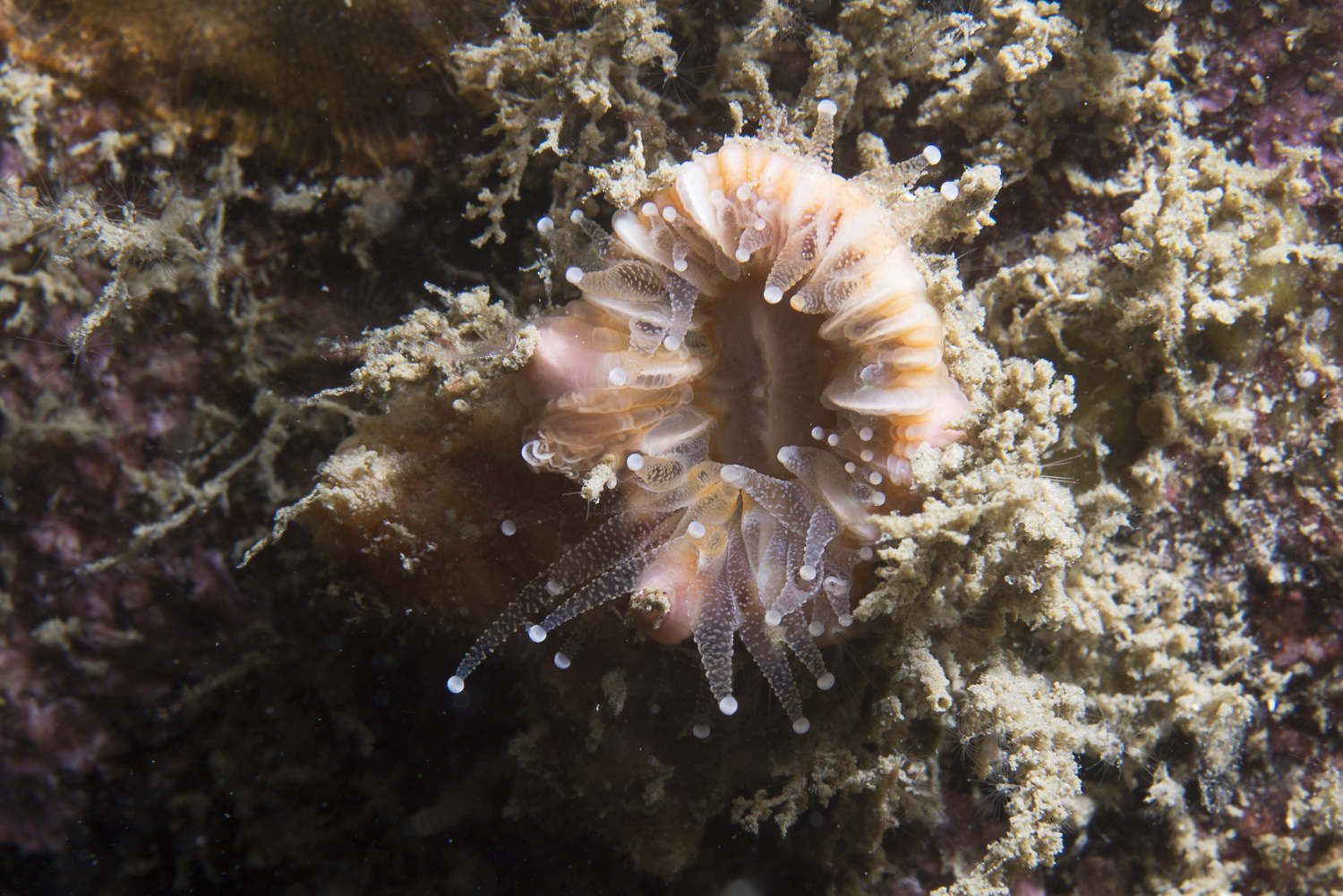

Scientific classification
- Kingdom: Animalia
- Phylum: Arthropoda
- Clade: Pancrustacea
- Class: Thecostraca
- Subclass: Cirripedia
- Order: Balanomorpha
- Family: Pyrgomatidae
- Genus: Adna; Sowerby, 1823
- Species: A. anglica

Binomial name
- Adna anglica Sowerby, 1823

Synonyms
- Species synonymy: Boscia anglica (Sowerby, 1823); Megatrema anglicum (Sowerby, 1823); Pyrgoma anglicum Sowerby, 1823

= Adna anglica =

Genus of barnacles

Adna is a genus of acorn barnacles that grows in association with or semi-parasitically on corals and octocorals. Its only species is Adna anglica. It is found in the intertidal zone on the coasts of northwestern Europe and in the Mediterranean Sea.

== Description ==
Adna anglica has a pink conical shell on a cup-shaped base and can grow to a diameter of up to 6 mm (0.24 in). There are longitudinal striations on the shell and the operculum, the lid to the opening through which the barnacle's feeding parts protrude, is depressed, so that the structure is vase-shaped. Another barnacle, Verruca stroemia, is sometimes found at the foot of the coral's calcified cup, but A. anglica seems to be the only barnacle species adapted to live near the coral's tentacles.

== Ecology ==
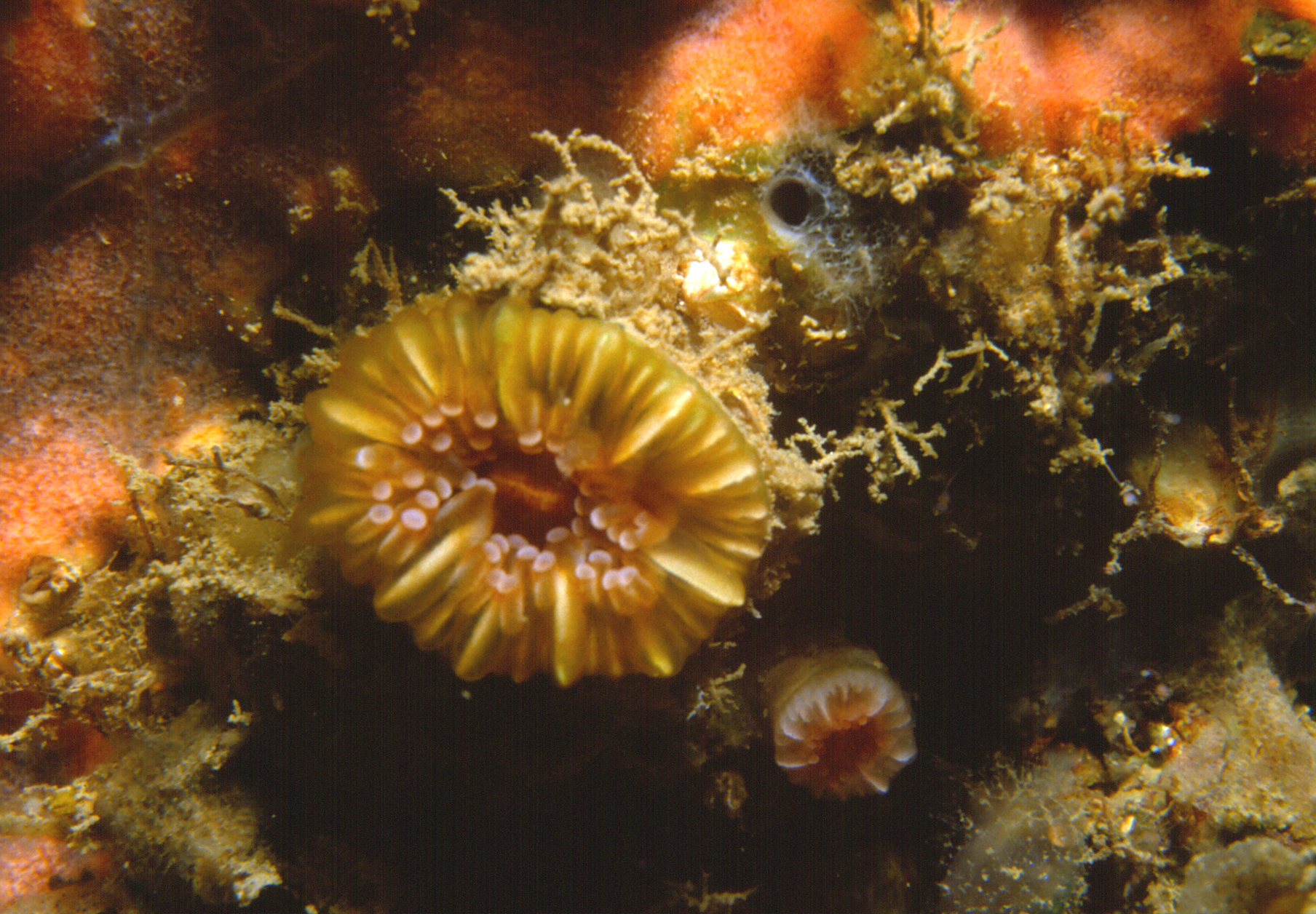
Caryophyllia smithi, the cup coral on which Adna anglica is frequently found

In British waters, where it is at the northern limit of its range, Adna anglica is found in association with the solitary cup coral Caryophyllia smithii, and in the Mediterranean it is often associated with the sunset cup coral (Leptopsammia pruvoti). However, it has been found growing on corals of at least eight different genera.

The cyprid larvae of the barnacle settle around the rims of the stony cups of the coral where they seem unaffected by the nematocysts (stinging cells). They become firmly attached and, except for their operculum, are overgrown by the epithelium of the coral. The barnacles benefit from this arrangement by being in an elevated position for better harvesting of food particles and by being free of competition from other organisms that are unable to withstand the coral's stinging cells. The coral probably derives no benefit from the arrangement so the barnacle can be considered an obligate semi-parasite. It is also likely to benefit from some diffusion of nutrients from the coenosarc (living tissue) of the coral which overgrows it, another reason for considering it parasitic.
