= Hoekia =

Scientific classification
- Kingdom: Animalia
- Phylum: Arthropoda
- Class: Thecostraca
- Subclass: Cirripedia
- Order: Balanomorpha
- Family: Pyrgomatidae
- Subfamily: Pyrgomatinae
- Genus: Hoekia; Ross & Newman, 1973

Genus of crustaceans

Hoekia is a genus of coral barnacles in the family Pyrgomatidae. There are at least four described species in Hoekia.

== Species ==
These species belong to the genus Hoekia:

- Hoekia fornix Ross & Newman, 1995
- Hoekia monticulariae (Gray, 1831)
- Hoekia mortensi Ross & Newman, 1995
- Hoekia philippensis Ross, 2000
