= Strombolicchio =

- Island
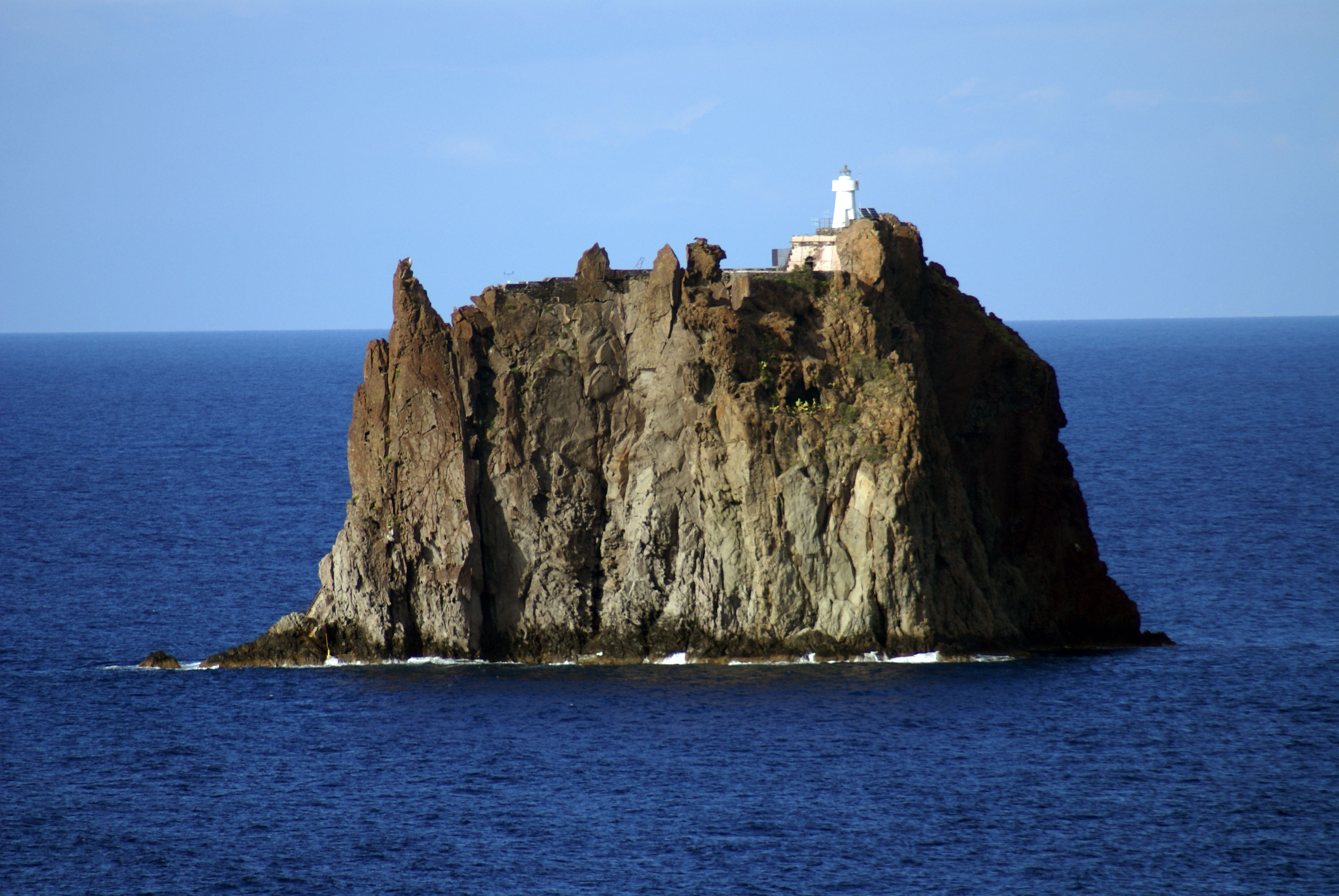
- Strombolicchio with its lighthouse

- Location in Italy
- Coordinates: 38°49′2″N 15°15′7″E
- Country: Italy
- Province: Messina
- Comune: Lipari

Population
  - Total: 0

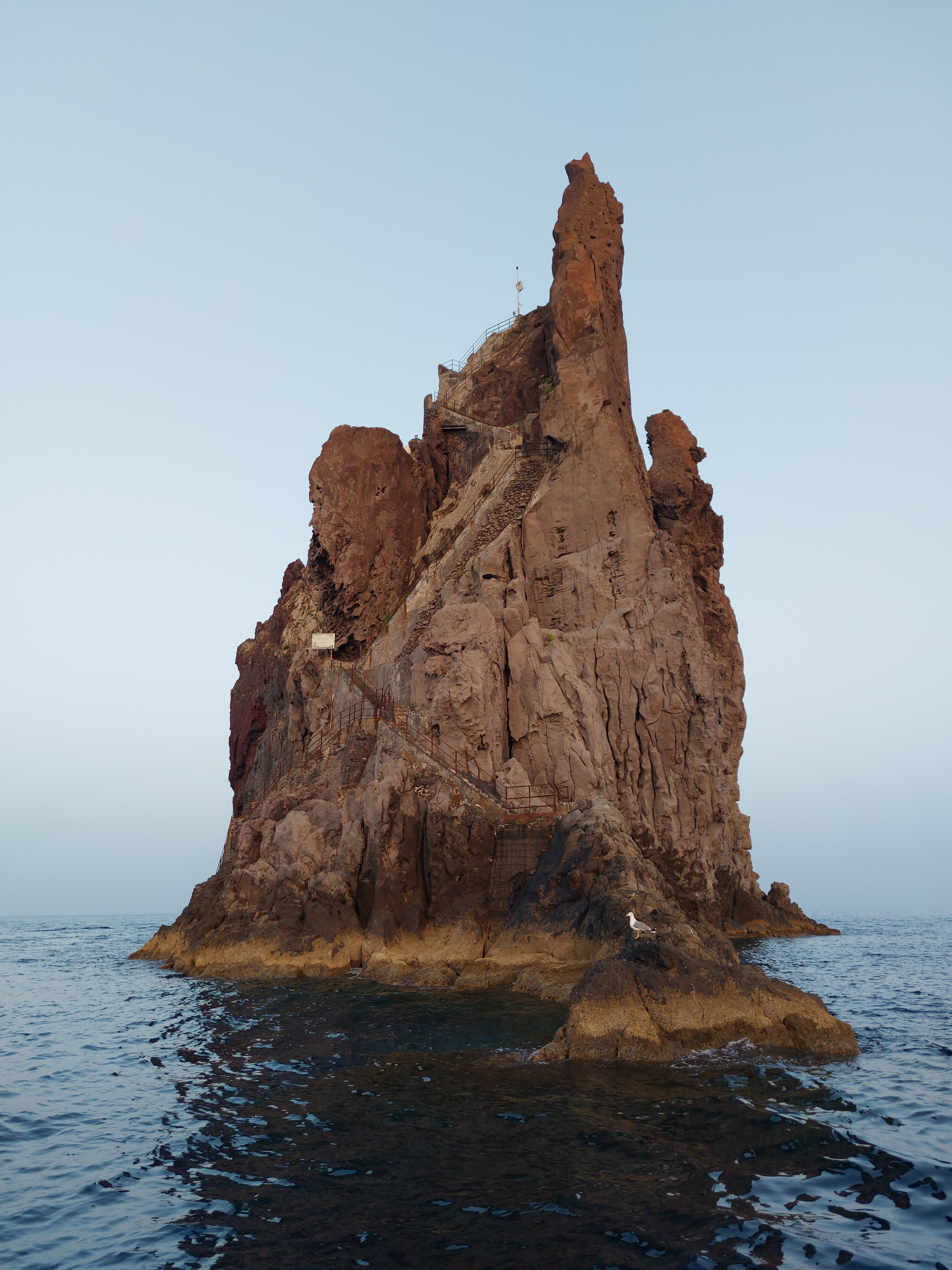
Stairs to the lighthouse on the northwest side of the island

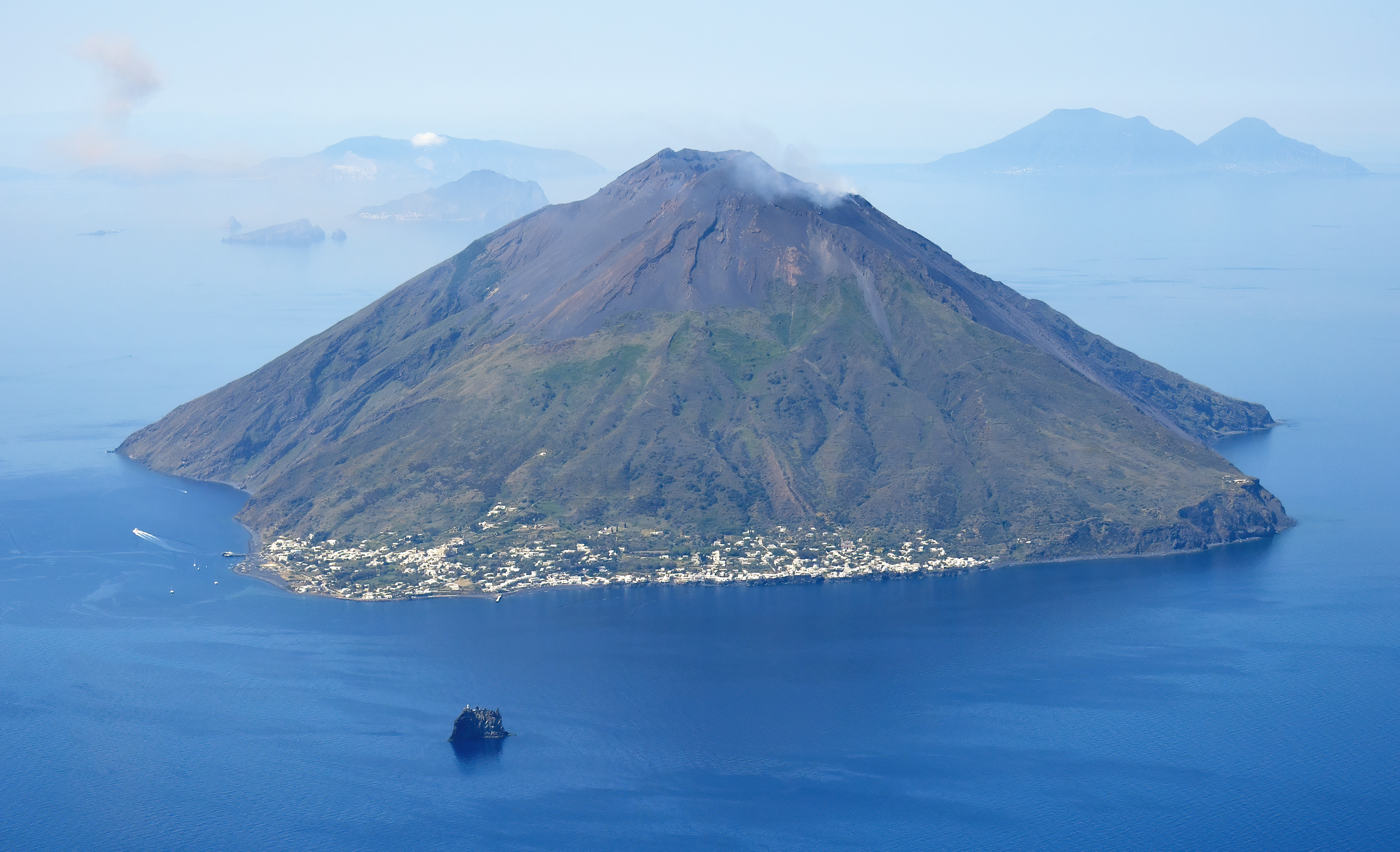
Aerial view of Stromboli and Strombolicchio from the northeast

Strombolicchio (Italian pronunciation: [stromboˈlikkjo]) is a sea stack of volcanic origin 2 km (1.2 mi) to the northeast of the island of Stromboli in the Aeolian Islands of Italy. Its name in the Sicilian language, Struognulicchiu, means Little Stromboli. Geologically, Strombolicchio is a volcanic plug or spine of extremely hard compacted basalt resistant to erosion, and is the remnant of the original volcano from which the island of Stromboli was built up about 200,000 years ago. The small islet hosts rare flora and fauna, including endangered species, and has been declared a natural reserve with severe restrictions on access.

== Geology ==
Geologically, Strombolicchio is a volcanic plug or spine of extremely hard compacted basalt resistant to erosion, and is the remnant of the original volcano from which the island of Stromboli was built up. Eruptions at this site ceased approximately 200,000 years ago. Since then the volcanic activity has moved about 3 km (1.9 mi) to the southwest. It is the only remnant above sea level of an otherwise submarine platform that extends between it and the main island.

Bathymetric and side-scan sonar surveys show that Strombolicchio rises from a narrow volcanic ridge that deflects and channels gravity-driven density currents generated in the nearby Sciara del Fuoco and Piscità canyons. Between 2,200 m and 2,300 m below sea level, intact pillow lava outcrops at the ridge-crest attest to relatively unmodified submarine flow sheets, marking the submerged "neck" upon which the sea stack stands.

== Flora and fauna ==
Strombolicchio hosts some rare species of flora and fauna and has been declared a natural reserve, with severe restrictions on access. Eokochia saxicola, for example, an endangered flower at risk of extinction, is otherwise present in only a few hundred specimens on the island of Capri. Podarcis raffonei, a rare lizard classified as at critical risk of extinction, is found at only three other locations, all of which are in the Aeolian Islands: a small islet off the coast of the nearby island of Salina, another islet off the coast of Filicudi, and in some areas of Vulcano.

The small islet supports a remarkably rich anthozoan (coral and sea anemone) community. The steep walls of Strombolicchio create distinct ecological zones with different light exposures and substrate conditions. The shaded northern wall hosts sciaphilic (shade-loving) species like the orange coral Astroides calycularis and the soft coral Paralcyonium elegans, while the southeastern and southwestern walls feature more photophilic (light-loving) species. Near smooth rock surfaces close to the water's surface, only Actinia equina can withstand the strong turbulence. Deeper areas host a diverse community including Telmatactis forskalii, Aiptasia mutabilis, and Cereus pedunculatus. Unlike other Mediterranean locations, Anemonia sulcata is relatively uncommon on Strombolicchio. The viviparity (live birth) observed in some Strombolicchio anthozoans, including Actinia equina mediterranea and Cereus pedunculatus, is unusual for the Mediterranean and suggests these may be isolated Atlantic populations.

== Notes ==
- Guest, John (2003). Volcanoes of Southern Italy. Geological Society. ISBN 1-86239-138-6.
