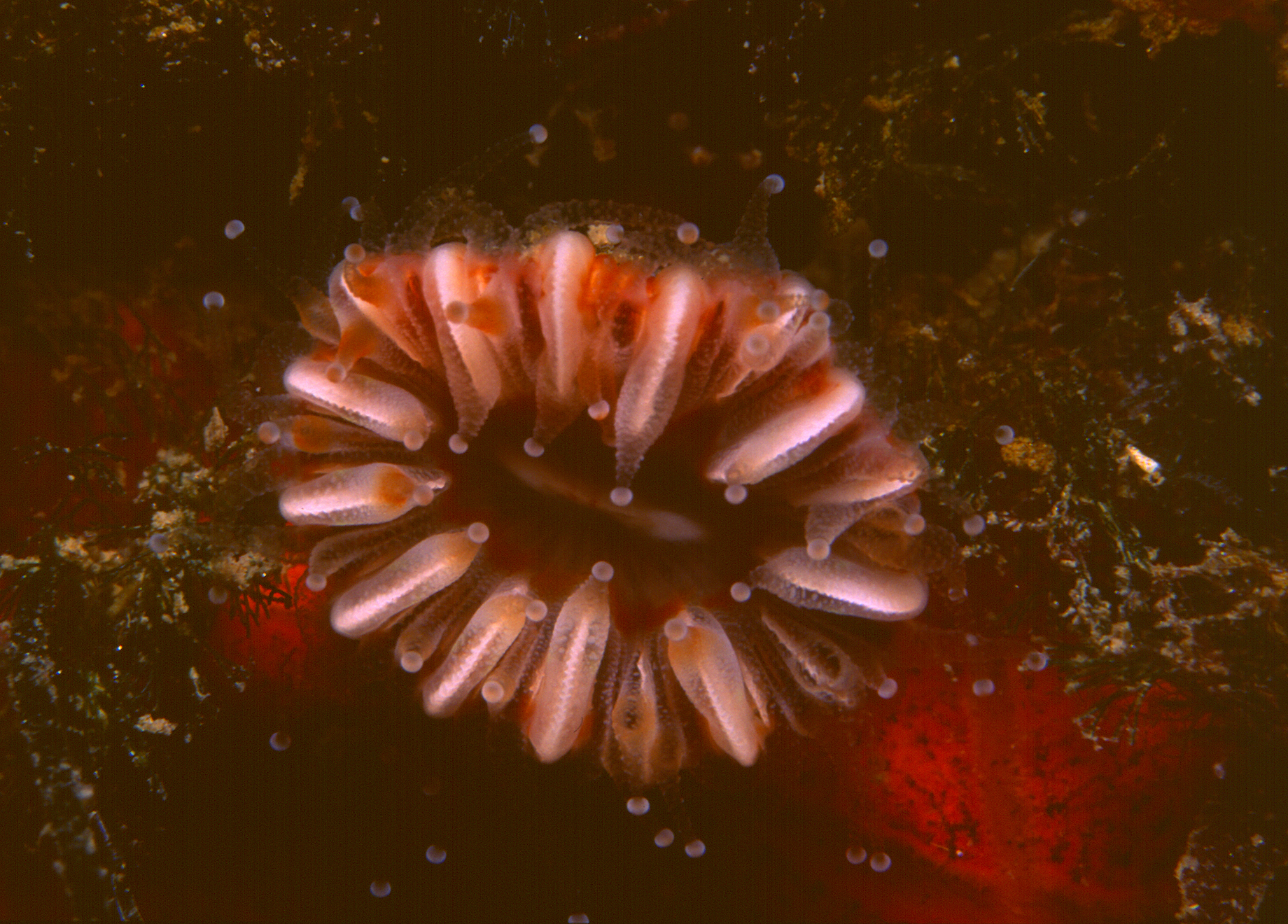

Conservation status
- Least Concern (IUCN 3.1) (Mediterranean)

Scientific classification
- Kingdom: Animalia
- Phylum: Cnidaria
- Subphylum: Anthozoa
- Class: Hexacorallia
- Order: Scleractinia
- Family: Caryophylliidae
- Genus: Caryophyllia
- Species: C. smithii

Binomial name
- Caryophyllia smithii Stokes & Broderip, 1828

Synonyms
- List: Caryophyllia clavus Scacchi, 1835; Caryophyllia pseudoturbinolia Michelin, 1841; Cyathina turbinata Philippi, 1836; Paracyathus humilis Duncan, 1878; Paracyathus monilis Duncan, 1878; Paracyathus pteropus Gosse, 1860; Paracyathus taxilianus Gosse, 1860; Paracyathus thulensis Gosse, 1860; Turbinolia borealis Fleming, 1828

= Caryophyllia smithii =

Species of coral

Caryophyllia smithii, the Devonshire cup coral, is a species of solitary coral in the family Caryophylliidae. It is native to the northeastern Atlantic Ocean, the North Sea and the Mediterranean Sea. There are shallow and deep-water forms which are structurally different. It forms part of a biodiverse community of rock encrusting organisms and is often parasitised by a barnacle.

== Description ==
Caryophyllia smithii is a solitary species of coral with a cup-shaped corallum (stony skeleton) with an elliptical base and a diameter of up to 25 mm (1 in). It is usually broader than it is high. The septa (vertical radial calcareous plates) are arranged in four to five cycles and have smooth edges. The column of the polyp can project by up to 30 mm (1.2 in) from the cup and there are about eighty tentacles each with a terminal knob. The polyp is translucent and the colour is variable and may be white, pink, orange, red, brown or bright green. Sometimes there are contrasting regions of colour, especially forming a zig-zag pattern round the mouth. The tentacles are colourless except for the white or brown terminal knobs and the many tiny warts. A form found in deep water is smaller and more delicate; it has an inverse cone shape which is narrowed at the base, while shallow water forms are cylindrical and more robust.

== Distribution and habitat ==
Caryophyllia smithii is found in the northeastern Atlantic Ocean as far north as the Shetland Islands, the North Sea and the Mediterranean Sea. The shallow water form occurs from the sublittoral zone down to about 100 m (328 ft). The deep water form occurs from about 50 m (164 ft) down to about 1,000 m (3,281 ft), generally in less turbulent waters than the more robust shallow water form. Sometimes its narrow base becomes detached from the substrate and it lives free on the seabed. This coral is abundant around the west coasts of the British Isles below the Laminaria zone and may occur at densities of over 100 per square metre below the red algae zone, being found both on flat rock and in crevices.

== Ecology ==
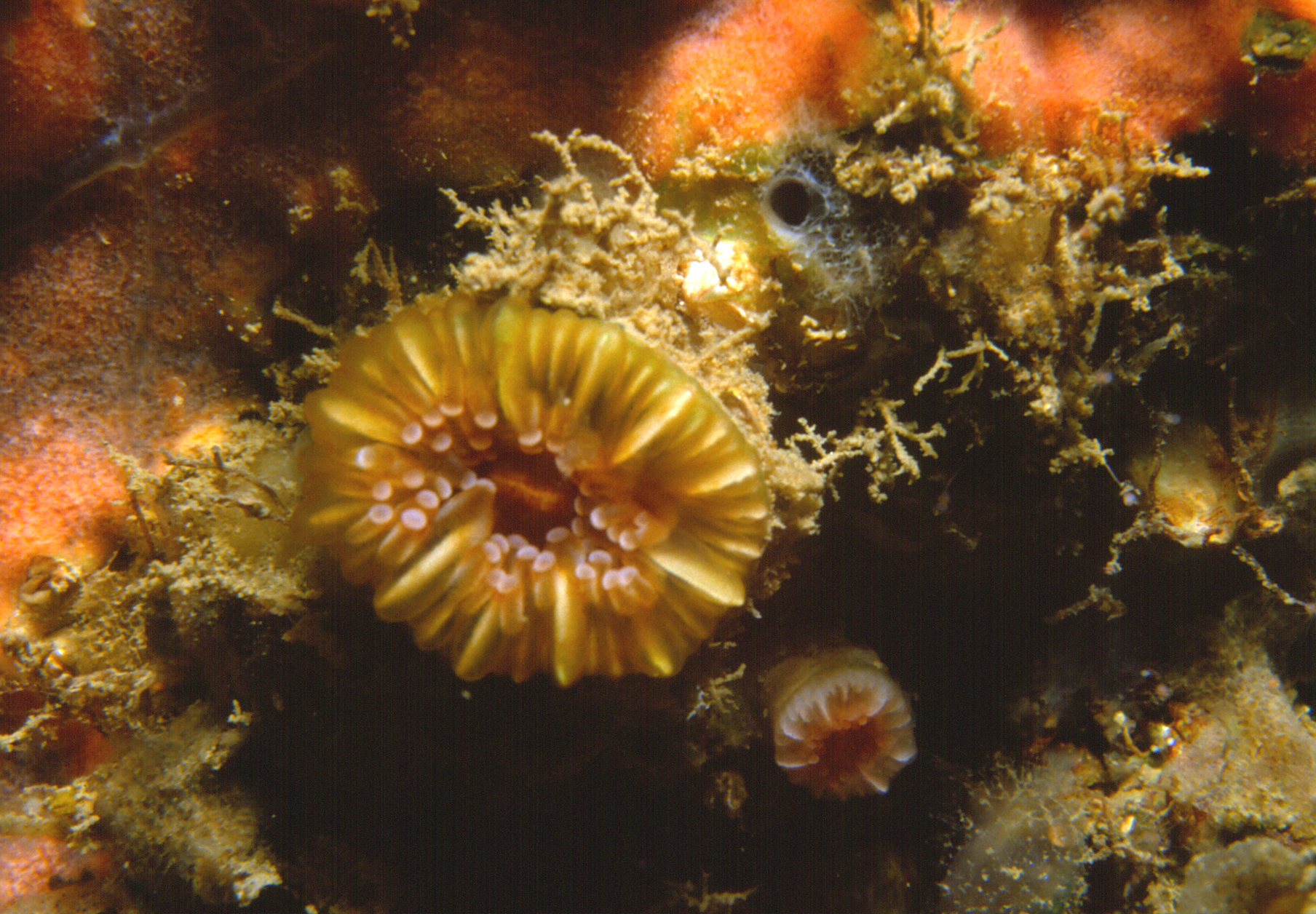
In natural habitat

The habitat of Caryophyllia smithii is often dominated by sponges and bryozoans and these also grow on the corallum of the coral. The larvae of the barnacle Megatrema anglicum often settle near the rim of the corallum where they appear to be immune to the coral's nematocysts. They become attached to the stony material and the coral's epithelium overgrows them except for their operculums. A single coral may be colonised by multiple barnacles and these have a tendency to aggregate on one particular part of the coral, often the lower side when corals are growing on vertical surfaces. The presence of these barnacles is semi-parasitic as the coral's tentacles retract when they come into contact with the barnacle's cirri (feeding appendages), and this hampers its food-gathering activities.
