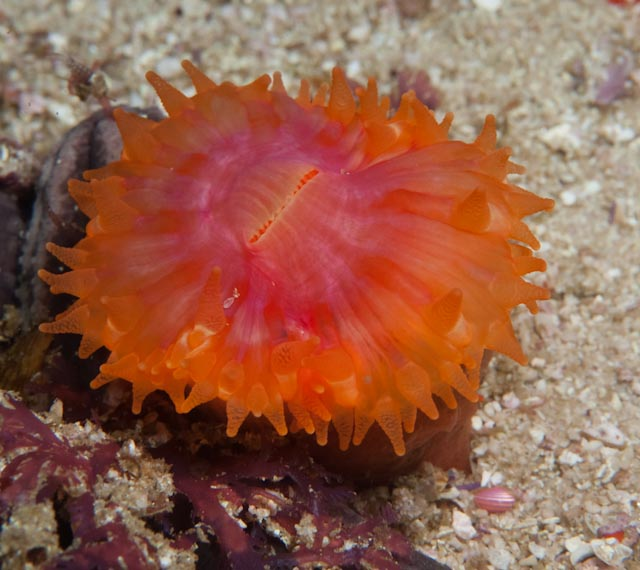
- Caryophyllia sp.

Scientific classification
- Kingdom: Animalia
- Phylum: Cnidaria
- Subphylum: Anthozoa
- Class: Hexacorallia
- Order: Scleractinia
- Family: Caryophylliidae
- Genus: Caryophyllia; Lamarck, 1801

Species
- See text

Synonyms
- Anthophyllum Schweigger, 1819; Ceratocyathus Seguenza, 1863; Cyathina Ehrenberg, 1834

= Caryophyllia =

Genus of corals

Caryophyllia is a genus of solitary corals in the family Caryophylliidae. Members of this genus are azooxanthellate (do not contain symbiotic algae) and are found in the North Atlantic Ocean and the Mediterranean Sea at depths down to 2,670 metres (8,760 ft).

== Subgenera ==
The genus has two subgenera and the following species according to the World Register of Marine Species:-

- Subgenus Acanthocyathus Milne Edwards & Haime, 1848
  - Caryophyllia decamera Cairns, 1998
  - Caryophyllia dentata (Moseley, 1881)
  - Caryophyllia grayi (Milne Edwards & Haime, 1848)
  - Caryophyllia karubarica Cairns & Zibrowius, 1997
  - Caryophyllia quangdongensis Zou, 1984
  - Caryophyllia spinicarens (Moseley, 1881)
  - Caryophyllia spinigera (Saville-Kent, 1871)
  - Caryophyllia unicristata Cairns & Zibrowius, 1997
  - Caryophyllia zanzibarensis Zou, 1984
- Subgenus Caryophyllia Lamarck, 1801
  - Caryophyllia abrupta Cairns, 1999
  - Caryophyllia abyssorum Duncan, 1873
  - Caryophyllia alaskensis Vaughan, 1941
  - Caryophylliax alberti Zibrowius, 1980
  - Caryophyllia ambrosia Alcock, 1898
  - Caryophyllia antarctica Marenzeller, 1904
  - Caryophyllia antillarum Pourtalès, 1874
  - Caryophyllia arnoldi Vaughan, 1900
  - Caryophyllia aspera Kitahara, Cairns & Miller, 2010
  - Caryophyllia atlantica (Duncan, 1873)
  - Caryophyllia balanacea Zibrowius & Gili, 1990
  - Caryophyllia barbadensis Cairns, 1979
  - Caryophyllia berteriana Duchassaing, 1850
  - Caryophyllia calveri Duncan, 1873
  - Caryophyllia cintinculata (Alcock, 1898)
  - Caryophyllia concreta Kitahara, Cairns & Miller, 2010
  - Caryophyllia conferta Dana, 1846
  - Caryophyllia cornulum Cairns & Zibrowius, 1997
  - Caryophyllia corona Duchassaing, 1870
  - Caryophyllia coronula Cairns & Polonio, 2013
  - Caryophyllia corrugata Cairns, 1979
  - Caryophyllia crosnieri Cairns & Zibrowius, 1997
  - Caryophyllia crypta Cairns, 2000
  - Caryophyllia cyathus (Ellis & Solander, 1786)
  - Caryophyllia diomedeae Marenzeller, 1904
  - Caryophyllia eltaninae Cairns, 1982
  - Caryophyllia ephyala Alcock, 1891
  - Caryophyllia foresti Zibrowius, 1980
  - Caryophyllia grandis Gardiner & Waugh, 1938
  - Caryophyllia hawaiiensis Vaughan, 1907
  - Caryophyllia horologium Cairns, 1977
  - Caryophyllia huinayensis Cairns, Haeussermann & Foersterra, 2005
  - Caryophyllia inornata (Duncan, 1878)
  - Caryophyllia japonica Marenzeller, 1888
  - Caryophyllia jogashimaensis Eguchi, 1968
  - Caryophyllia kellerae Cairns & Polonio, 2013
  - Caryophyllia laevigata Kitahara, Cairns & Miller, 2010
  - Caryophyllia lamellifera Moseley, 1881
  - Caryophyllia mabahithi Gardiner & Waugh, 1938
  - Caryophyllia marmorea Cairns, 1984
  - Caryophyllia oblonga Kitahara, Cairns & Miller, 2010
  - Caryophyllia octonaria Cairns & Zibrowius, 1997
  - Caryophyllia octopali Vaughan, 1907
  - Caryophyllia paradoxus Alcock, 1898
  - Caryophyllia paucipalata Moseley, 1881
  - Caryophyllia perculta Cairns, 1991
  - Caryophyllia planilamellata Dennant, 1906
  - Caryophyllia polygona Pourtalès, 1878
  - Caryophyllia profunda Moseley, 1881
  - Caryophyllia protei Duchassaing, 1870
  - Caryophyllia quadragenaria Alcock, 1902
  - Caryophyllia ralphae Cairns, 1995
  - Caryophyllia rugosa Moseley, 1881
  - Caryophyllia sarsiae Zibrowius, 1974
  - Caryophyllia scobinosa Alcock, 1902
  - Caryophyllia secta Cairns & Zibrowius, 1997
  - Caryophyllia seguenzae Duncan, 1873
  - Caryophyllia sewelli Gardiner & Waugh, 1938
  - Caryophyllia smithii Stokes & Broderip, 1828
  - Caryophyllia solida Cairns, 1991
  - Caryophyllia squiresi Cairns, 1982
  - Caryophyllia stellula Cairns, 1998
  - Caryophyllia tangaroae Kitahara, Cairns & Miller, 2010
  - Caryophyllia transversalis Moseley, 1881
  - Caryophyllia valdiviae Zibrowius & Gili, 1990
  - Caryophyllia versicolorata Kitahara, Cairns & Miller, 2010
  - Caryophyllia zopyros Cairns, 1979

Unallocated species in the genus include:

- Caryophyllia arcuata † Milne Edwards & Haime, 1849
- Caryophyllia paucipaliata † Yabe & Eguchi, 1932
- †Caryophyllia viola Duncan, 1864
