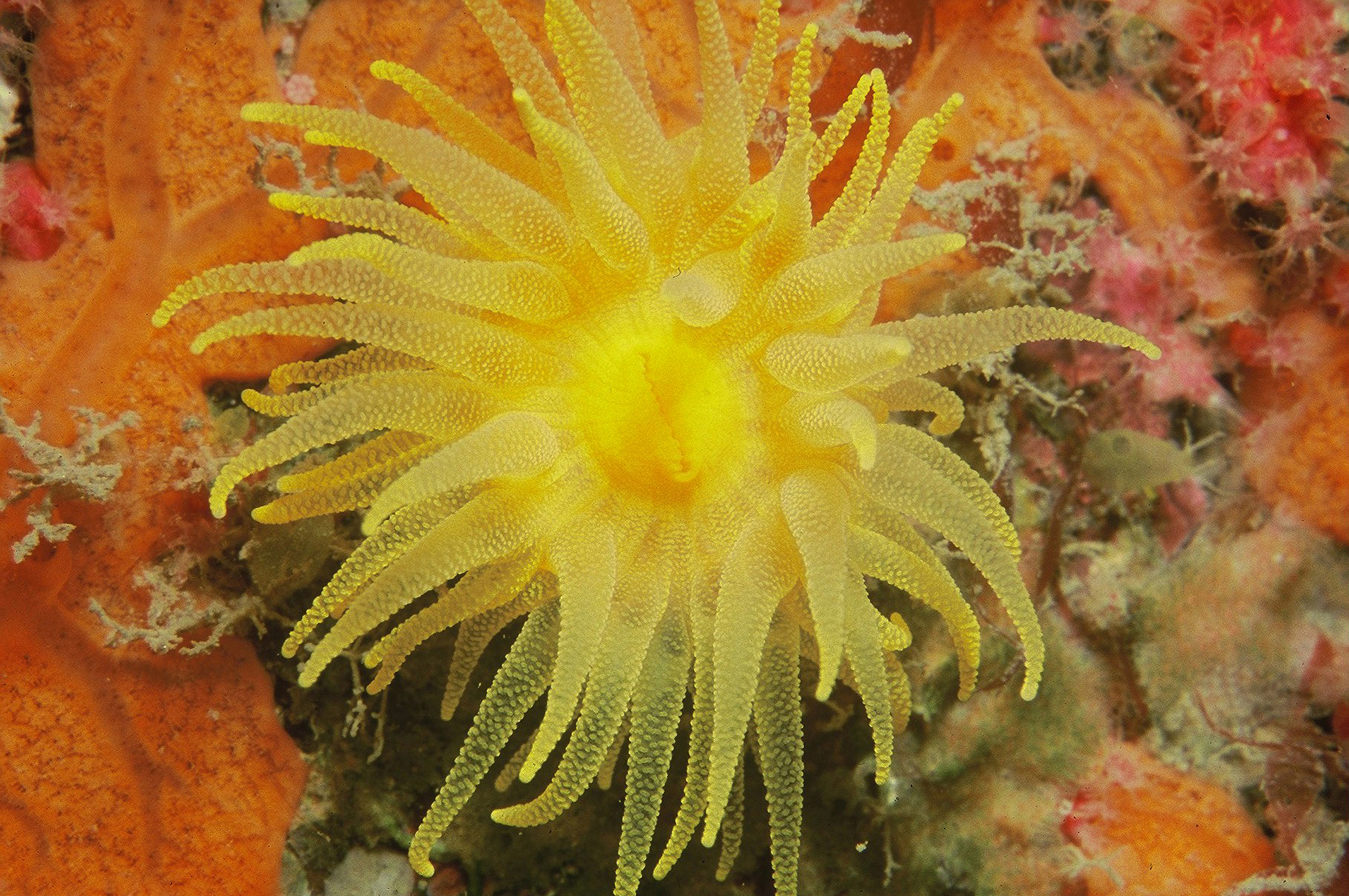
- Sunset cup coral (Leptopsammia pruvoti)

Scientific classification
- Kingdom: Animalia
- Phylum: Cnidaria
- Subphylum: Anthozoa
- Class: Hexacorallia
- Order: Scleractinia
- Family: Dendrophylliidae
- Genus: Leptopsammia; Milne-Edwards & Haime, 1848

Species
- See text

= Leptopsammia =

Genus of corals

Leptopsammia is a genus of stony cup corals in the family Dendrophylliidae. Members of this genus are found at depths down to about 900 metres (3,000 ft). They are azooxanthellate, meaning that they do not contain symbiotic photosynthetic algae as do many species of coral.

== Species ==
The following species are listed in the World Register of Marine Species (WoRMS):

- Leptopsammia britannica (Duncan, 1870)
- Leptopsammia chevalieri Zibrowius, 1980
- Leptopsammia columna Folkeson, 1919
- Leptopsammia crassa van der Horst, 1922
- Leptopsammia formosa (Gravier, 1915)
- Leptopsammia poculum (Alcock, 1902)
- Leptopsammia pruvoti Lacaze-Duthiers, 1897
- Leptopsammia queenslandiae Wells, 1964
- Leptopsammia stokesiana Milne Edwards & Haime, 1848
- Leptopsammia trinitatis Hubbard & Wells, 1987
