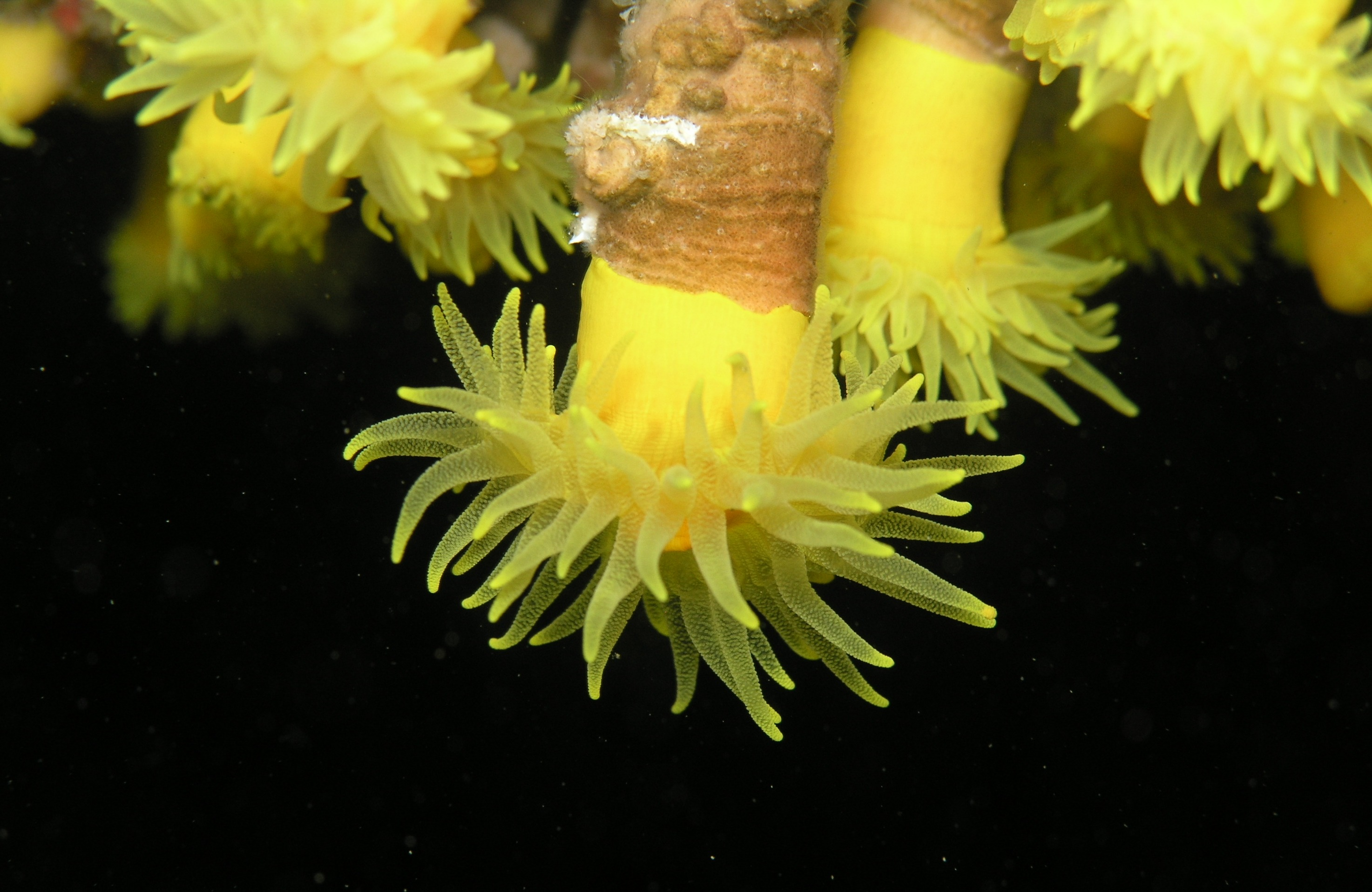
- Leptopsammia pruvoti

Conservation status
- Least Concern (IUCN 3.1) (Mediterranean)

Scientific classification
- Kingdom: Animalia
- Phylum: Cnidaria
- Subphylum: Anthozoa
- Class: Hexacorallia
- Order: Scleractinia
- Family: Dendrophylliidae
- Genus: Leptopsammia
- Species: L. pruvoti

Binomial name
- Leptopsammia pruvoti Lacaze-Duthiers, 1897

Synonyms
- Leptopsammia microcardia Döderlein, 1913

= Leptopsammia pruvoti =

Sunset cup coral

Species of coral

Leptopsammia pruvoti, the sunset cup coral, is a solitary stony coral in the family Dendrophylliidae. It is an azooxanthellate species, meaning its tissues do not contain the symbiotic unicellular algae (zooxanthellae) of the genus Symbiodinium, as do most corals. It is native to the Mediterranean Sea. The species was described by Henri de Lacaze-Duthiers in 1897 and named to honor the French marine biologist Georges Pruvot.

== Description ==
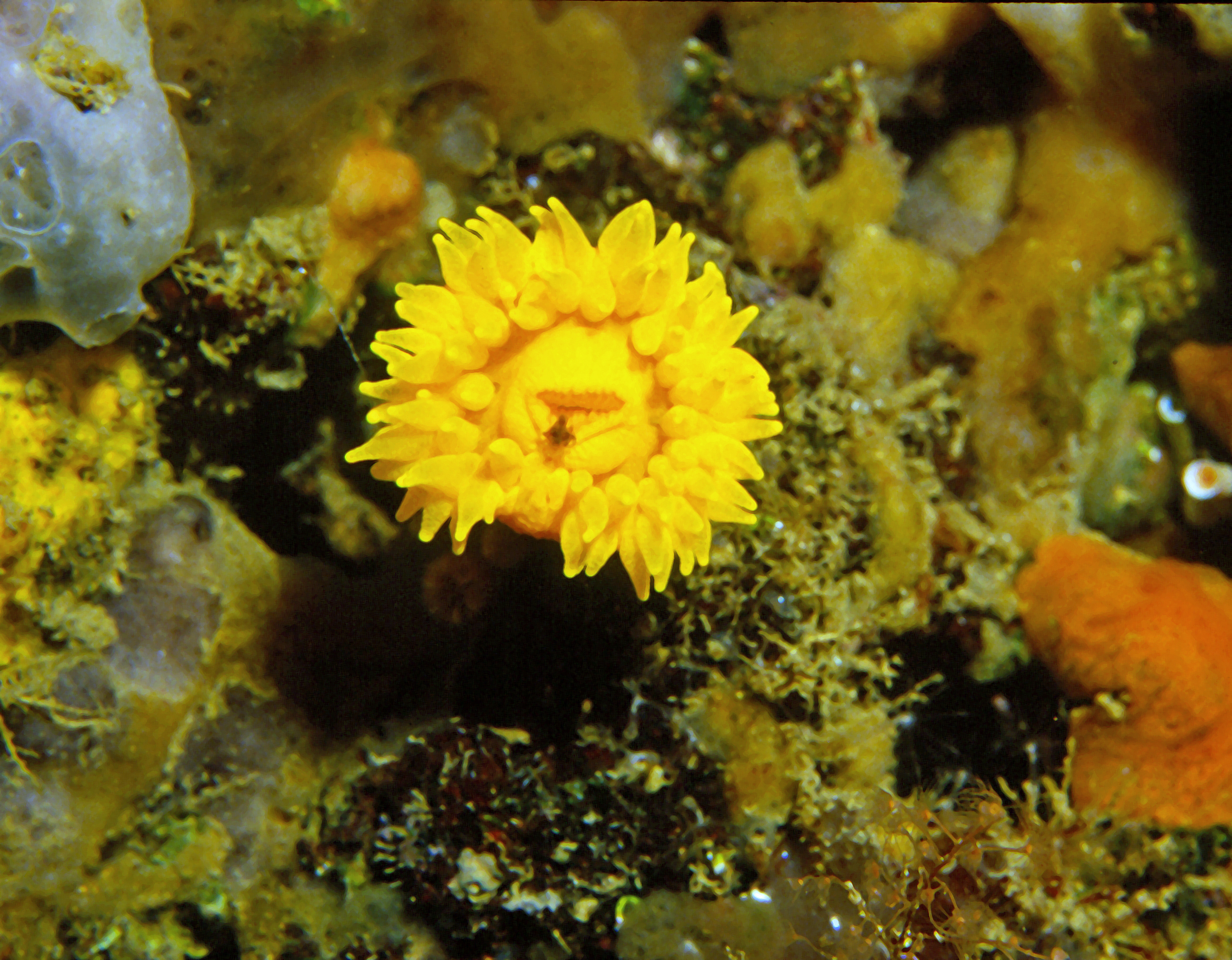
Leptosammia pruvoti partially retracted

Leptopsammia pruvoti is a solitary stony coral and superficially resembles a sea anemone. The polyp sits in a calcareous cup, wider at the base than the top, which varies in shape from cylindrical and short to conical and long. It grows to a height of about 60 mm (2.4 in) and a diameter of 20 mm (0.8 in). The polyp is yellow or orange with about ninety-six long, translucent yellow tentacles. It can retract back into the skeletal cup, so that the tentacles become barely visible. This species can be confused with another yellow or orange cup coral, Balanophyllia regia, but that species never grows so large and has fewer tentacles.

== Distribution and habitat ==
Leptopsammia pruvoti is found in the western Mediterranean Sea and the Adriatic and on the Atlantic coasts of Portugal, Brittany, the Channel Islands and southwestern England. Independent of sunlight, it is found under boulders, on bedrock, in crevices, under overhangs and in caves at depths between 10 and 40 metres (33 and 131 ft).

In a sea cave in Italy it was noticed that the colonial coral Astroides calycularis was plentiful in well-lit locations but became less numerous in the darker parts of the cave while L. pruvoti became more abundant in dark positions. However, in locations where sulphur-laden spring water mixed with the sea water, this situation was reversed and Astroides calycularis was more common. The relative proportions of the two species may have been affected by the existence of mats of sulphur-digesting bacteria around the spring.

== Ecology ==
A barnacle, Megatrema anglicum, is often found living parasitically inside Leptopsammia pruvoti.

The breeding strategy of L. pruvoti involves high fecundity, a short incubation time for the embryos, small planula larvae and rapid maturation. The generation time is about 2.3 years and maximum longevity 13 years.
