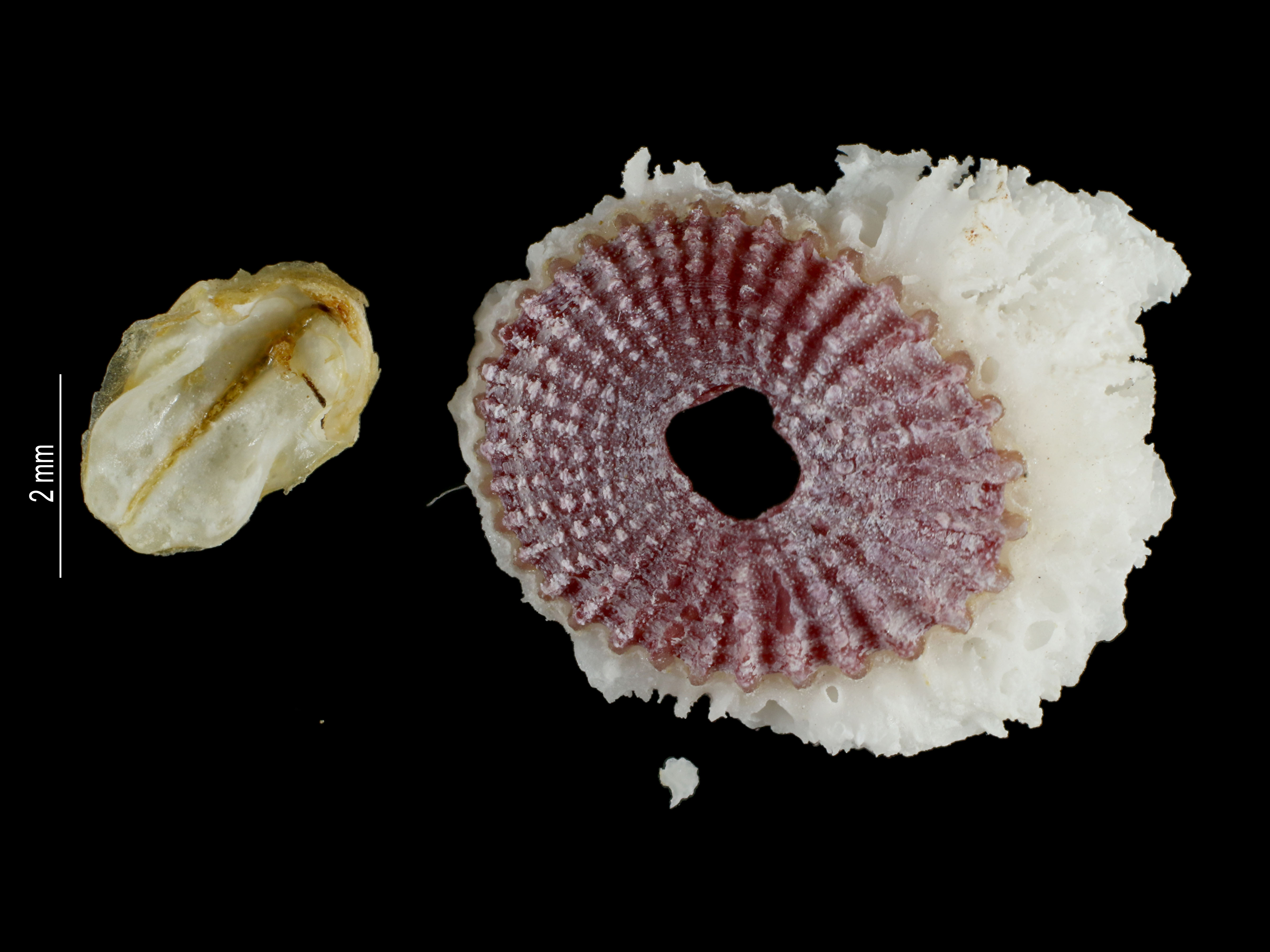
- Trevathana synthesysae, Indian Ocean

Scientific classification
- Kingdom: Animalia
- Phylum: Arthropoda
- Class: Thecostraca
- Subclass: Cirripedia
- Order: Balanomorpha
- Family: Pyrgomatidae
- Subfamily: Pyrgomatinae
- Genus: Trevathana; Anderson, 1992

= Trevathana =

Genus of crustaceans

Trevathana is a genus of coral barnacles in the family Pyrgomatidae. There are about 11 described species in Trevathana.

== Species ==
These species belong to the genus Trevathana:

- Trevathana dentata (Darwin, 1854)
- Trevathana isfae Achituv & Langsam, 2009
- Trevathana jensi Brickner, Simon-Blecher & Achituv, 2010
- Trevathana margaretae Brickner, Simon-Blecher & Achituv, 2010
- Trevathana mizrachae Brickner, Simon-Blecher & Achituv, 2010
- Trevathana niuea Achituv, 2004
- Trevathana orientalis (Ren, 1986)
- Trevathana paulayi Asami & Yamaguchi, 2001
- Trevathana sarae Brickner, Simon-Blecher & Achituv, 2010
- Trevathana synthesysae Achituv & Langsam, 2009
- Trevathana tureiae Achituv & Langsam, 2005
