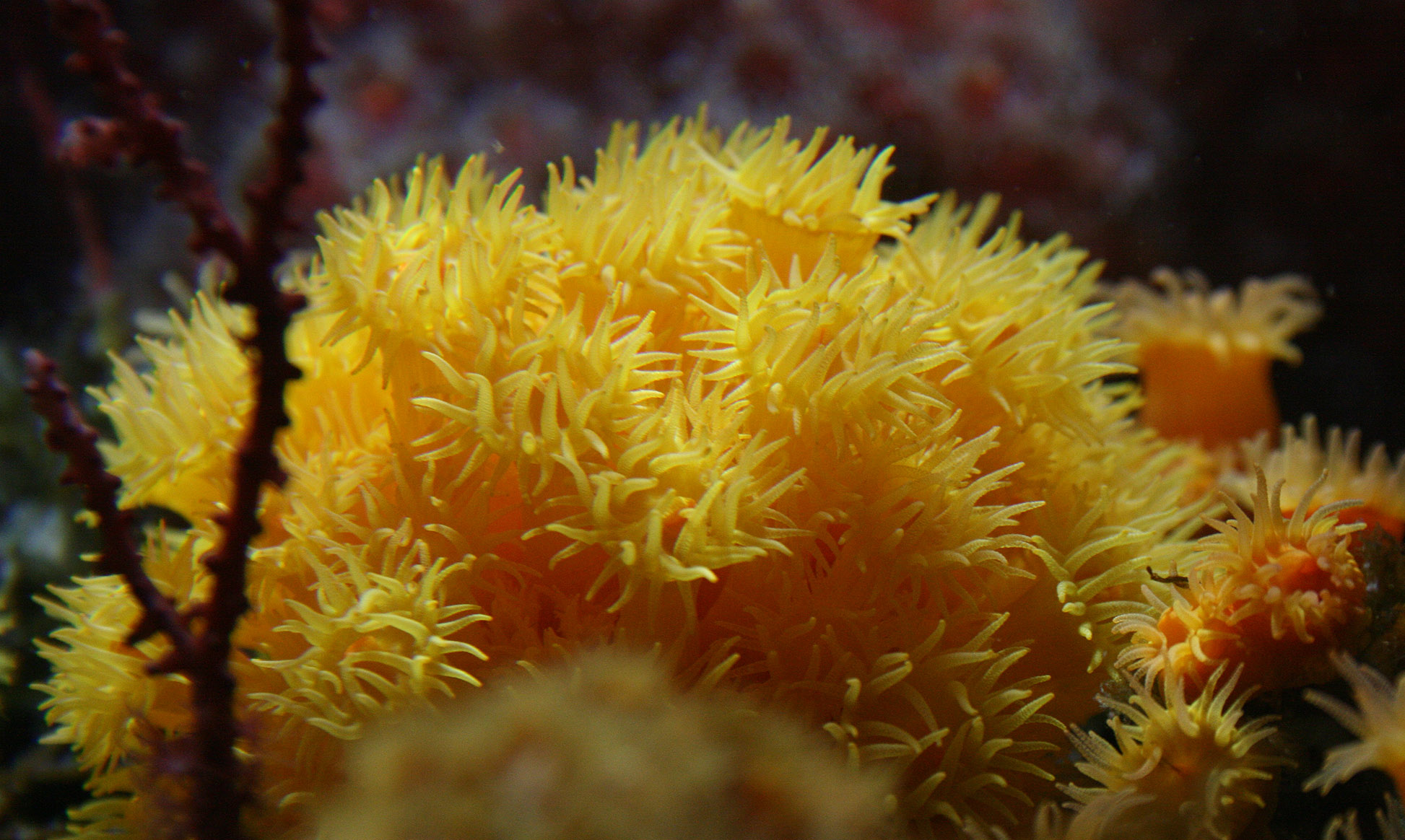
- Astroides calycularis colony with tentacles expanded

Conservation status
- Least Concern (IUCN 3.1) (Mediterranean)

Scientific classification
- Kingdom: Animalia
- Phylum: Cnidaria
- Subphylum: Anthozoa
- Class: Hexacorallia
- Order: Scleractinia
- Family: Dendrophylliidae
- Genus: Astroides; Quoy & Gaimard, 1827
- Species: A. calycularis

Binomial name
- Astroides calycularis (Pallas, 1766)

= Astroides =

Astroides calycularis

Genus of corals

Astroides is a genus of stony cup corals in the family Dendrophylliidae. It is monotypic and the only species is Astroides calycularis, which is endemic to the western Mediterranean Sea. The species was first described in 1766 by the German naturalist Peter Simon Pallas.

== Description ==
Astroides calycularis is a colonial coral, consisting of a group of polyps, each of which sits in a stony cup known as a calyx. The colonies are 25 to 30 cm (10 to 12 in) in diameter and 10 cm (4 in) high and each polyp is about 1 to 2 cm (0.4 to 0.8 in) in diameter. The polyps are yellow or orange, each with a fringe of about thirty very short tentacles surrounding a slit-shaped mouth. The colony grows by asexual reproduction, new polyps budding off existing polyps and secreting their own calices. Deep-water colonies are bush-shaped, the calices are circular and budding occurs at various heights on the calyx walls. Shallow-water colonies tend to be ellipsoid in shape, the calyces are polygonal and budding occurs in the centre of the colony as well as round the edges.

== Distribution and habitat ==
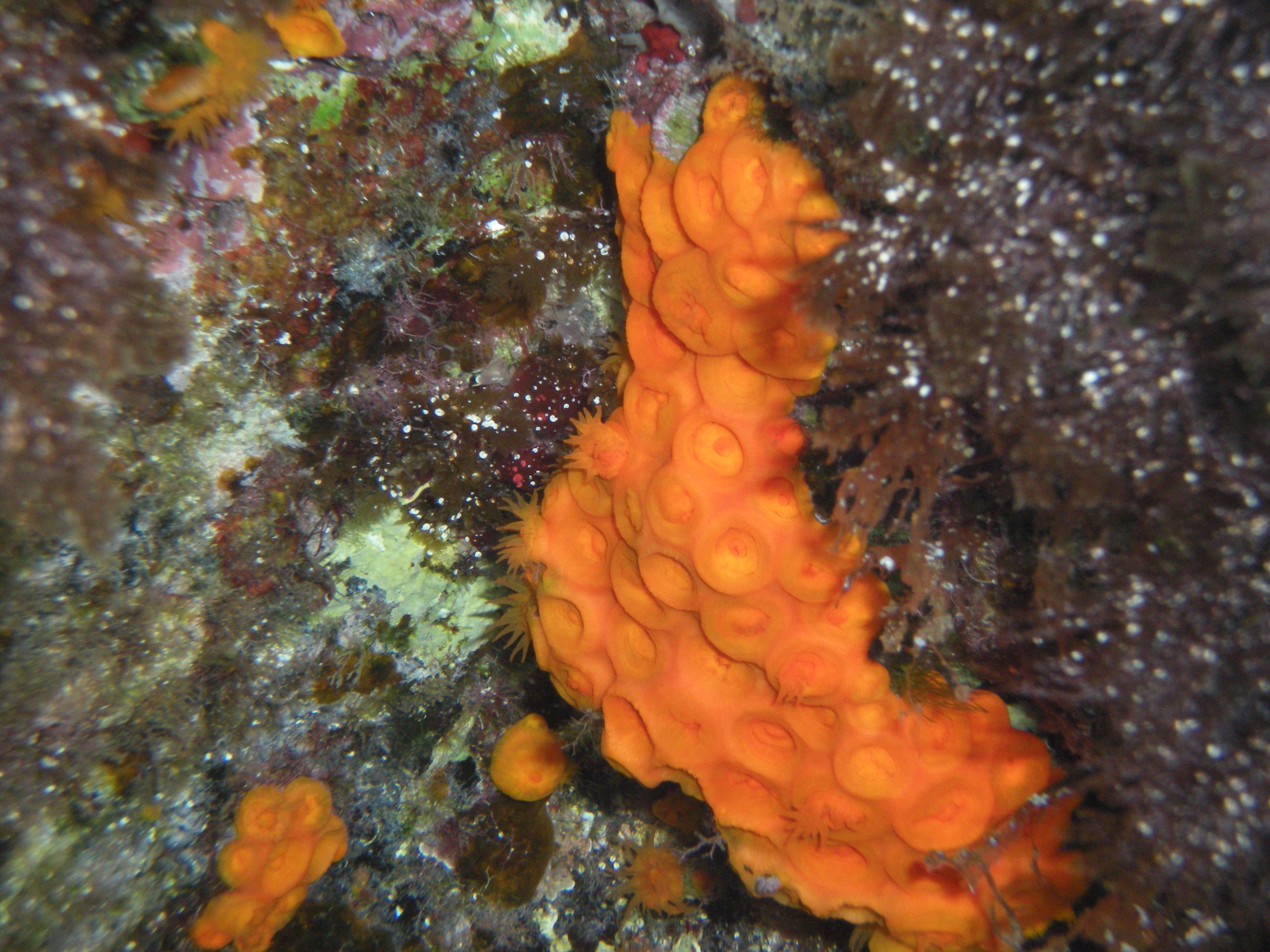
A. calycularis

During the Pleistocene, Astroides calycularis had a wider distribution than it does now, and was present in the whole of the western Mediterranean. Since then it has disappeared from the northern part of that range as a result of the lower sea temperatures that resulted from glaciation. Nowadays it is native to the part of the western Mediterranean Sea that is south of Sardinia and is also present in the Atlantic Ocean near the Strait of Gibraltar. Before 1989 it was restricted to the area west of Sicily, but in that year it appeared in the Adriatic Sea for the first time. This coincided with a sudden change of circulation in the eastern Mediterranean which may have allowed the short-lived pelagic larvae to survive long enough to settle on the seabed of the Croatian coast. A. calycularis is found on rocks and walls, under overhangs and in submarine caves at depths down to about 70 m (230 ft). In suitable locations, colonies can cover 90% of the available substrate. In a cave in Italy, it was more common in better lit parts than was the solitary sunset cup coral (Leptopsammia pruvoti), and was more abundant near where sulphurous spring water flowed into the cave.

== Biology ==
Astroides calycularis is nocturnal, the polyps remaining retracted back into their calices during the day. When expanded at night, they feed on zooplankton, small fish and perhaps bacteria. This coral is azooxanthellate, meaning it does not contain symbiotic dinoflagellates in its tissues as do many species of coral.

A. calycularis colonies are gonochoristic with all the polyps in a colony being of the same sex. Males liberate sperm into the sea and fertilisation takes place in the coelenteron (gastric cavity) of the female. The eggs have yolks, and the embryos are brooded in the coelenteron until they are liberated into the water column as planula larvae.
