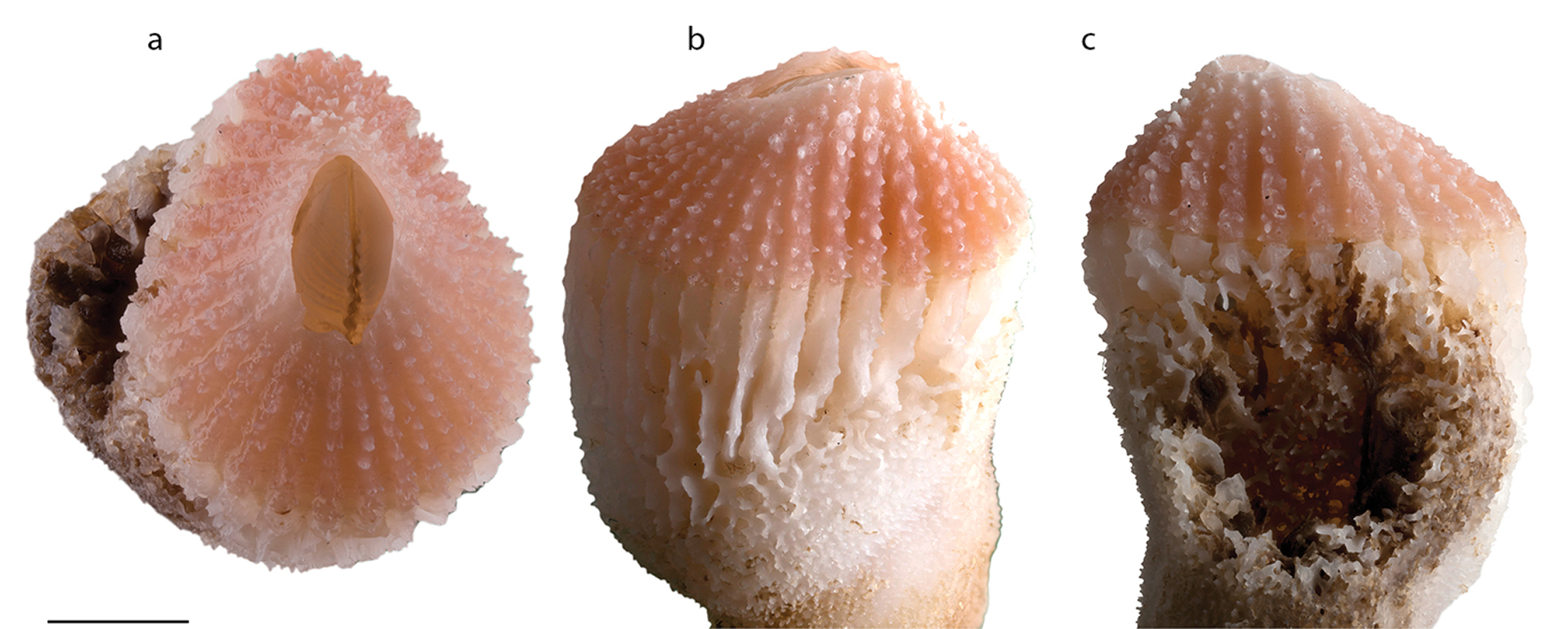
- Pyrgomina

Scientific classification
- Kingdom: Animalia
- Phylum: Arthropoda
- Class: Thecostraca
- Subclass: Cirripedia
- Order: Balanomorpha
- Superfamily: Balanoidea
- Family: Pyrgomatidae; Gray, 1825

= Pyrgomatidae =

Family of crustaceans

Pyrgomatidae is a family of barnacles belonging to the order Balanomorpha.

== Genera ==
The following genera are members of the family Pyrgomatidae:

Subfamily Ceratoconchinae Newman & Ross, 1976

Ceratoconcha Kramberger-Gorjanovic, 1889
†Eoceratoconcha Newman & Ladd, 1974

Subfamily Megatrematinae Holthuis, 1982

Adna Sowerby, 1823
Megatrema Sowerby, 1823
Memagreta Ross & Pitombo, 2002
Pyrgomina Baluk & Radwanski, 1967

Subfamily Pyrgomatinae Gray, 1825

Ahoekia Ross & Newman, 1995
Arossella Anderson, 1993
Australhoekia Ross & Newman, 2000
Cantellius Ross & Newman, 1973
Cionophorus Ross & Newman, 2001
Creusia Leach, 1817
Darwiniella Anderson, 1992
Eohoekia Ross & Newman, 1995
Galkinius Perreault, 2014
Hiroa Ross & Newman, 1973
Hoekia Ross & Newman, 1973
Neopyrgoma Ross & Newman, 2002
Neotrevathana Ross, 1999
Nobia Sowerby, 1839
Parahoekia Ross & Newman, 1995
Pyrgoma Leach, 1817
Pyrgopsella Zullo, 1967
Pyrgospongia Achituv & Simon-Blecher, 2006
Savignium Leach, 1825
Trevathana Anderson, 1992
